= Interstate 15 in Idaho =

Section of Interstate highway in Idaho, United States

Interstate 15
- I-15 highlighted in red

Route information
- Maintained by ITD
- Length: 196 mi (315 km)
- NHS: Entire route

Major junctions
- South end: I-15 at the Utah state line near Woodruff
- US 91 near Arimo; US 30 near McCammon; I-86 in Pocatello; US 26 in Blackfoot; US 20 in Idaho Falls
- North end: I-15 at the Montana state line at Monida Pass

Location
- Country: United States
- State: Idaho
- Counties: Oneida, Bannock, Bingham, Bonneville, Jefferson, Clark

Highway system
- Interstate Highway System; Main; Auxiliary; Suffixed; Business; Future; Idaho State Highway System; Interstate; US; State
← SH-14	→ SH-16

Interstate 15 (I-15) is a part of the Interstate Highway System that runs from San Diego, California, to Sweetgrass, Montana. In Idaho, the Interstate Highway runs exactly 196 miles (315 km) from the Utah state line near Woodruff north to the Montana state line at Monida Pass. I-15 is the primary north–south highway of Eastern Idaho. The Interstate Highway connects Pocatello and Idaho Falls, the fourth and fifth largest cities in Idaho, and the smaller county seats of Malad City, Blackfoot, and Dubois. I-15 connects all of those cities with Salt Lake City to the south and Butte to the north. The Interstate has business loops through McCammon, Inkom, Pocatello, Blackfoot, and Idaho Falls.

== Route description ==
I-15 is designated the Veterans Memorial Highway for its entire length in Idaho.

=== Woodruff to Pocatello ===
I-15 enters Oneida County from Box Elder County, Utah, south of the hamlet of Woodruff. The four-lane freeway heads north parallel to the Union Pacific Railroad's Malad Subdivision rail line, a road named Old Highway 191, and the Malad River along the eastern edge of the wide Malad Valley adjacent to the Malad Range. I-15 has a diamond interchange with Woodruff Road at Woodruff and follows the western edge of Caribou National Forest. The highway passes just to the east of the county seat, Malad City, where the highway has a diamond interchange with the eastern end of Idaho State Highway 38 (SH 38). I-15 continues along Deep Creek to another diamond interchange with the western end of SH 36. From there, the freeway follows the narrow valley of Devil Creek between the Bannock Range to the east and Elkhorn Mountain to the west. I-15 has one more diamond interchange in Oneida County next to Devils Creek Reservoir before the highway reaches Malad Summit, where the highway leaves the Great Salt Lake watershed and enters the Snake River watershed.

I-15 enters Bannock County and descends into the Marsh Valley, named for Marsh Creek, which the highway begins to parallel at its diamond interchange with SH 40, which heads east toward Downey. At a diamond interchange at the hamlet of Virginia, the freeway begins to run concurrently with U.S. Route 91 (US 91) and parallel Union Pacific's Pocatello Subdivision rail line and Old Highway 91. I-15 and US 91 have diamond interchanges with Arimo Road just west of Arimo and with the southern end of I-15 Bus. south of McCammon. At the north end of McCammon, the freeway reconnects with its business route and is joined by US 30. I-15 heads north through Indian Rocks State Park along a ridge between Marsh Creek to the west and the Portneuf River to the east, then crosses the Portneuf River just east of its confluence with Marsh Creek.

I-15 crosses over the rail line and Old Highway 91 as it curves west to follow the narrow valley of the Portneuf River between the Bannock Range to the south and the Pocatello Range to the north. The highway has partial interchanges with I-15 Bus. on either side of the tiny city of Inkom. I-15 begins to curve north at its four-ramp partial cloverleaf interchange with Old Highway 91 at Portneuf shortly before entering the city of Pocatello. US 30 and US 91 split off from the freeway at the next interchange, a diamond interchange with Fifth Avenue that marks the southern end of Pocatello's I-15 Bus. I-15 veers away from the rail line and the Portneuf River, has a diamond interchange with Clark Street east of downtown Pocatello, and collects the other end of I-15 Bus. at its diamond interchange with Pocatello Creek Road. The freeway leaves the city of Pocatello at its directional T interchange with I-86. I-15 passes along the eastern edge of the city of Chubbuck, which is accessed using I-86.

=== Pocatello to Monida Pass ===
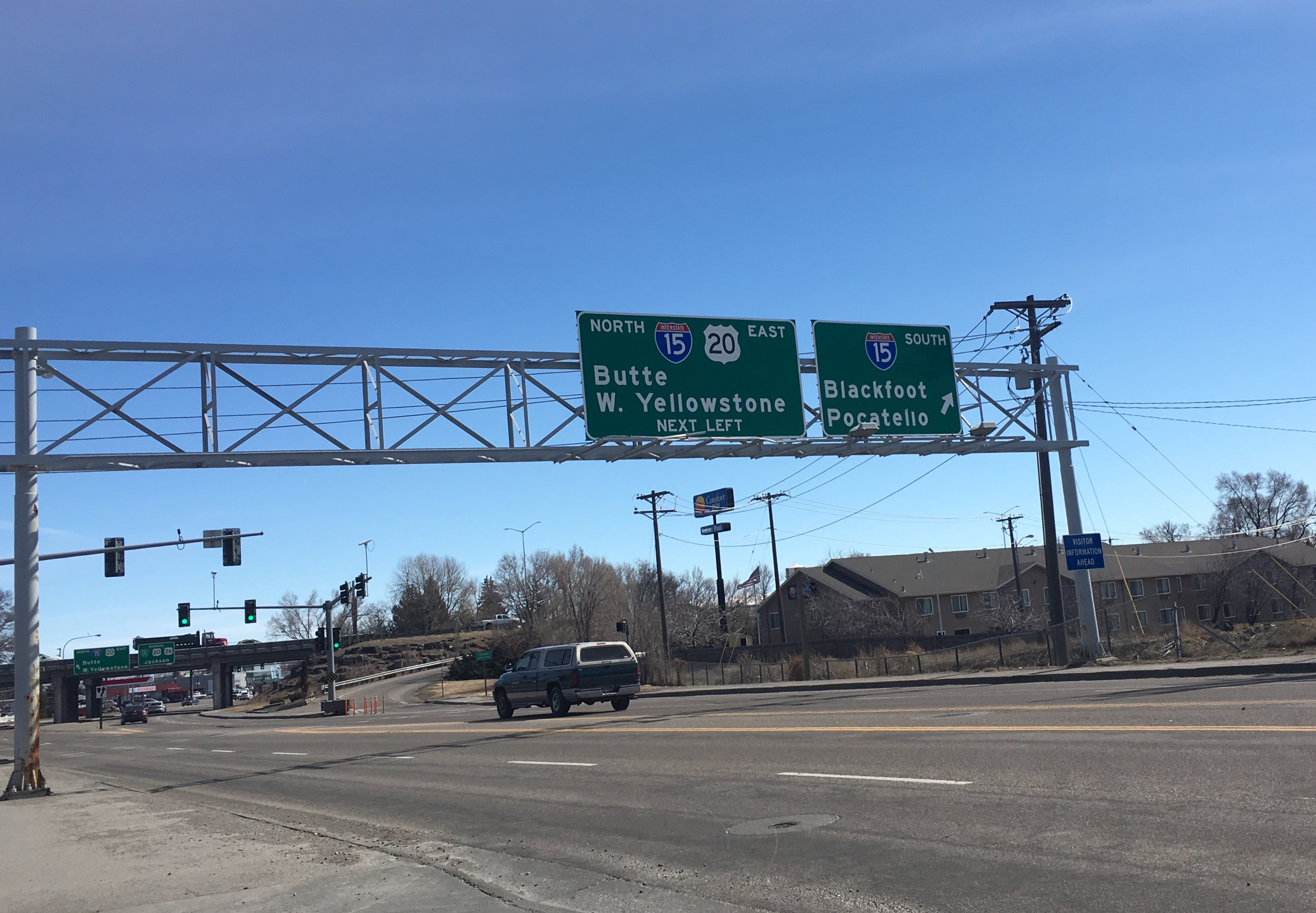
I-15/US 20 Jct. in Idaho Falls, ID

I-15 continues north onto the Snake River Plain and into the Fort Hall Indian Reservation. The highway accesses the reservation's main settlement, Fort Hall, via a diamond interchange with Ross Fork Road on the Bannock–Bingham county line. I-15 has a four-ramp partial cloverleaf interchange with US 91, at which the highway crosses over Union Pacific's Montana Subdivision rail line, near the northern edge of the reservation; I-15 Bus. splits northeast with US 91 from this interchange. The freeway curves northeast and crosses the Blackfoot River and begins to parallel the Snake River as it passes along the western edge of the city of Blackfoot. I-15 Bus. reconnects with I-15 at a diamond interchange with US 26 (Bridge Street), which runs concurrently with the freeway leaving Blackfoot. The highway crosses the Snake River at the northern edge of the city. I-15 has a partial cloverleaf interchange near Rose before it crosses a pair of irrigation canals. The freeway then travels across the eastern part of the Hell's Half Acre Lava Field ahead of its interchange with River Road, which provides access to Shelley east of the Snake River.

In Bonneville County, US 26 and I-15 Bus. split off onto Sunnyside Road shortly before I-15 enters Idaho Falls. The freeway has a five-ramp partial cloverleaf interchange with US 20 (West Broadway Street), from which US 20 Bus. splits east concurrent with I-15 Bus., which returns to the mainline Interstate. I-15 and US 20 run concurrently to a four-ramp partial cloverleaf interchange where US 20 heads northeast as a freeway towards Rexburg and Yellowstone National Park. The freeway heads north out of Idaho Falls parallel to the Montana Subdivision rail line, Old Highway 91, and the Snake River. I-15 enters Jefferson County just north of its diamond interchange with Osgood Road, and the freeway diverges from the Snake River at Roberts, where it has a diamond interchange with the western end of SH 48.

I-15 passes Market Lake Wildlife Management Area ahead of its diamond interchange with SH 33 at Sage Junction. The highway has a diamond interchange with Hamer Road at Hamer and briefly passes through the Camas National Wildlife Refuge and crosses Camas Creek, which flows into Mud Lake. I-15 follows a tributary of Camas Creek, Beaver Creek, into Clark County and its county seat of Dubois, where the freeway meets the eastern end of SH 22 at a diamond interchange. North of Dubois, the freeway has a partial cloverleaf interchange with Sheep Station Road that serves the U.S. Sheep Experiment Station. I-15 continues along Beaver Creek through a diamond interchange at Spencer as the freeway enters the Bitterroot Range. The freeway enters Targhee National Forest and has diamond interchanges with Stoddard Creek Road and at Humphrey. I-15 reaches its northern end in Idaho at Monida Pass, where the highway crosses the Continental Divide into Beaverhead County, Montana.

== History ==
Two major sections of I-15 were opened in late 1965: the Arimo to McCammon section in October and the Inkom to South Pocatello section in November. The freeway was extended around Pocatello on August 5, 1966.

== Future ==
Reconstruction of the interchange with I-86 in Chubbuck began in August 2022 and is scheduled to be completed in 2025 at a cost of $112 million. The new design eliminates left-side ramps from I-15 and allows traffic from the Pocatello Creek Road interchange to merge onto either freeway. A new interchange to the north at New Day Parkway was opened in December 2019 as part of Chubbuck's Northgate development.

== Exit list ==
County	Location	mi	km	Exit	Destinations	Notes
Oneida		0.000	0.000		I-15 south (Veterans Memorial Highway) – Salt Lake City	Continuation into Utah
Oneida	Woodruff	2.54	4.09	3	Woodruff Road – Woodruff, Samaria	
Oneida	Malad City	12.888	20.741	13	SH-38 west – Malad	Eastern terminus of SH-38
Oneida		16.55	26.63	17	SH-36 east (Deep Creek Road) – Weston, Preston	Western terminus of SH-36
Oneida		21.523	34.638	22	Colton Lane – Devil Creek Reservoir	
Bannock		30.884	49.703	31	SH-40 east (Woodland Road) – Downey, Preston	Western terminus of SH-40
Bannock	Virginia	35.900	57.775	36	US 91 south – Downey, Preston	South end of concurrency with US-91
Bannock	Arimo	40.462	65.117	40	Arimo Road – Arimo	
Bannock		44.075	70.932	44	I-15 BL north (Jensen Road) – McCammon	
Bannock	McCammon	47.164	75.903	47	I-15 BL south / US 30 east – McCammon, Lava Hot Springs, Soda Springs, Montpelier	South end of concurrency with US-30
Bannock	Inkom	56.646	91.163	57	I-15 BL north – Inkom	Northbound exit, southbound entrance
Bannock	Inkom	57.694	92.849	58	I-15 BL south – Inkom	Southbound exit, northbound entrance
Bannock	Portneuf	63.037	101.448	63	Portneuf Road – Portneuf Area	
Bannock	Pocatello	66.806	107.514	67	I-15 BL north / US 30 west / US 91 north (Fifth Avenue)	North end of concurrencies with US-30 and US-91
Bannock	Pocatello	69.396	111.682	69	Clark Street	
Bannock	Pocatello	71.000	114.263	71	I-15 BL south (Pocatello Creek Road) – Pocatello	
Bannock	Chubbuck	72.121	116.067	72	I-86 west – Twin Falls	I-86 exits 63A-B; eastern terminus of I-86; tri-stack directional T interchange; former I-15W
Bannock	Chubbuck	73.480	118.255	73	Northgate Parkway, New Day Parkway	
Bannock–Bingham county line	Fort Hall	79.903	128.591	80	Ross Fork Road – Fort Hall	
Bingham		88.764	142.852	89	I-15 BL north / US 91 – Blackfoot	
Bingham	Blackfoot	92.525	148.905	93	I-15 BL south / US 26 west / SH-39 – Blackfoot, Arco, Aberdeen	South end of concurrency with US-26
Bingham	Rose	97.681	157.202	98	Lambert Road – Rose, Firth	
Bingham		107.990	173.793	108	River Road – Shelley Area	
Bonneville	Woodville	113.212	182.197	113	65th South – Shelley	
Bonneville	Idaho Falls	115.890	186.507	116	I-15 BL north / US 26 east (Sunnyside Road) – Ammon, Jackson	North end of concurrency with US-26
Bonneville	Idaho Falls	118.543	190.776	118	I-15 BL south / US 20 Bus. east (Broadway Street east) / US 20 west (Broadway Street west) – Historic Downtown, Arco	South end of concurrency with US-20
Bonneville	Idaho Falls	119.098	191.670	119	US 20 east – Rigby, West Yellowstone, Airport, Idaho Falls	North end of concurrency with US-20
Bonneville		127.525	205.232	128	Osgood Road – Osgood Area	
Jefferson	Roberts	134.568	216.566	135	SH-48 east – Roberts, Rigby	Western terminus of SH-48
Jefferson	Sage Junction	143.003	230.141	143	SH-33 / Weigh Station – Rexburg, Salmon, Mud Lake	Signed separately southbound as unnumbered exit (Weigh Station) and exit 143 (SH-33)
Jefferson	Hamer	149.609	240.772	150	Hamer Road – Hamer	
Clark	Dubois	167.038	268.822	167	SH-22 west / CR A2 – Dubois	Northern terminus of SH-22
Clark		171.974	276.765	172	Ranch Exit	
Clark	Spencer	180.389	290.308	180	Spencer Road – Spencer	
Clark		184.407	296.774	184	Stoddard Creek Road – Stoddard Creek Area	
Clark	Humphrey	189.857	305.545	190	Humphrey Road – Humphrey	
Continental Divide (Monida Pass)		196.000	315.431	Idaho–Montana line		
Continental Divide (Monida Pass)		196.000	315.431		I-15 north – Butte	Continuation into Montana
1.000 mi = 1.609 km; 1.000 km = 0.621 mi: Concurrency terminus; Incomplete access

== Business routes ==
I-15 has five Interstate business loops in McCammon, Inkom, and Pocatello in Bannock County, as well as in Blackfoot in central Bingham County and Idaho Falls in western Bonneville County. Some of these routes are overlapped by segments of US 91.

Interstate 15
Previous state: Utah	Idaho	Next state: Montana
