= List of Interstate Highways in Idaho =

Interstate Highways of the Idaho State Highway System
- Typical Interstate highway markers
- Interstate Highways highlighted in red

System information
- Maintained by ITD
- Length: 611.31 mi (983.81 km)
- Formed: 1956

Highway names
- Interstates: Interstate n (I-n)
- US Highways: U.S. Highway n (US-n)
- State: Idaho State Highway n (SH-n)

System links
- Idaho State Highway System; Interstate; US; State

The Interstate Highways in Idaho are the segments of the Dwight D. Eisenhower National System of Interstate and Defense Highways owned and maintained by the Idaho Transportation Department (ITD) in the U.S. state of Idaho. The state has five Interstate Highways that total approximately 611 miles (983 km) in length.

== Mainline highways ==
Number	Length (mi)	Length (km)	Southern or western terminus	Northern or eastern terminus	Formed	Removed	Notes
I-15	196.000	315.431	I-15 near Woodruff	I-15 at Monida Pass	1957	current	
I-15W	62.850	101.147	I-84 / US 30 near Declo	I-15 in Chubbuck	1957	1978	Became I-86
I-80N	275.650	443.616	I-84 near Fruitland	I-84 near Black Pine	1957	1980	Became I-84
I-84	275.650	443.616	I-84 near Fruitland	I-84 near Black Pine	1980	current	Designated as I-80N until 1980
I-86	62.850	101.147	I-84 / US 30 near Declo	I-15 in Chubbuck	1978	current	Designated as I-15W until 1978
I-90	73.888	118.911	I-90 in State Line	I-90 at Lookout Pass	1957	current	
I-180N	3.620	5.826	I-84 / US 30 in Boise	US 20 / US 26 in Boise	1970	1979	Became I-184
I-184	3.620	5.826	I-84 / US 30 in Boise	US 20 / US 26 in Boise	1979	current	Designated as I-180N until 1979, completed in 1990
Former

== Business routes ==
Number	Length (mi)	Length (km)	Southern or western terminus	Northern or eastern terminus	Formed	Removed	Notes
I-15 BL	4.338	6.981	I-15/US 91 exit 44 near McCammon	I-15/US 30/US 91 exit 47 in McCammon	—	—	
I-15 BL	1.000	1.609	I-15/US 30/US 91 exit 57 in Inkom	I-15/US 30/US 91 exit 58 in Inkom	—	—	
I-15 BL	5.560	8.948	I-15/US 30/US 91 exit 67 in Pocatello	I-15 exit 69 in Pocatello	—	—	US 30 and US 91 branches off I-15 at its southern end
I-15 BL	4.802	7.728	I-15 exit 89 southwest of Blackfoot	I-15/US 26 exit 93 in Blackfoot	—	—	I-15 and US 26 begin concurrency at northern end
I-15 BL	7.230	11.636	I-15/US 26 exit 116 near Idaho Falls	I-15/US 20 Bus. exit 118 in Idaho Falls	—	—	Concurrent with Us 26 at south end and US 20 Bus. at north end
I-84 BL	12.557	20.209	I-84/US 20/US 26/US 30 exit 27 in Caldwell	I-84/US 30/SH-55 exit 38 in Nampa	—	—	
I-84 BL	—	—	I-84/US 30 exit 49 west of Boise	I-84/US 20/US 26/US 30 exit 54 in Boise	—	—	Now part of I-184, US 20, and US 26
I-84 BL	5.985	9.632	I-84/US 20/US 26/US 30 exit 90 near Mountain Home	I-84/US 26/US 30 exit 99 near Mountain Home	—	—	
I-84 BL	—	—	I-84/US 26/US 30/SH-78 exit 112 in Hammett	I-84/US 26/US 30 exit 114 near Hammett	—	—	Runs concurrent with SH-78 at west end
I-84 BL	1.425	2.293	I-84/US 26/US 30 exit 120 in Glenns Ferry	I-84/US 26/US 30 exit 121 in Glenns Ferry	—	—	
I-84 BL	3.518	5.662	I-84/US 26/US 30 exit 137 near Bliss	I-84/US 26 exit 141 in Bliss	—	—	Runs concurrent with US 30 near whole length. Road continues as US 26 at east end
I-84 BL	6.56	10.56	I-84/SH-27 exit 208 near Burley	I-84/US 30/SH-24 near Heyburn	—	—	Entirely concurrent with SH-27 at west end then US 30 to east end. Road continues as SH-24
I-86 BL	6.475	10.421	I-86/US 30/SH-37 exit 36 near Neeley	I-86/US 30/SH-39 exit 40 in American Falls	1972	current	Concurrent with SH-39 toward east end
I-90 BL	5.640	9.077	I-90 exit 2 west of Post Falls	I-90 exit 6 in Post Falls	—	—	
I-90 BL	3.834	6.170	I-90 exit 11 near Coeur d'Alene	I-90 exit 15 in Coeur d'Alene	—	—	
I-90 BL	1.4	2.3	I-90 exit 49 near Kellogg	I-90 exit 51 in Kellogg	—	—	
I-90 BS	3.966	6.383	I-90 exit 57 in Osburn	E. Mullan Ave. in downtown Osburn	—	—	Originally a business loop that ran from exit 57 to exit 60 to Silverton via Silver Valley Road. Split into two separate spurs
I-90 BS	0.12	0.19	I-90 exit 60 in Silverton	Silver Valley Rd south of Silverton	—	—	Part of original loop that once ran from I-90 exit 57 in Osburn to exit 60 in Silverton via Silver Valley road. Split into two separate spurs
I-90 BL	1.243	2.000	I-90 exit 61 near Wallace	I-90 exit 62 in Wallace	—	—	Originally part of I-90 that contained a traffic signal before entering Wallace. Became I-90BL when I-90 was rerouted north as a full freeway
I-90 BL	1.000	1.609	I-90 exit 68 in Mullan	I-90 exit 69 near Mullan	—	—	
Former

== See also ==
- List of U.S. Highways in Idaho
- List of state highways in Idaho
