= Beaver Creek (Camas Creek tributary) =

Stream in the state of Idaho

- Location of the mouth of Beaver Creek in Idaho

Location
- Country: United States
- State: Idaho
- Counties: Clark County, Idaho, Jefferson County, Idaho

Physical characteristics
- Source
  - location: near Monida Pass, Clark County, Idaho
  - coordinates: 44°30′23″N 112°21′26″W
  - elevation: 7,367 ft (2,245 m)
- Mouth: Camas Creek
  - location: north of Hamer, Jefferson County, Idaho
  - coordinates: 43°59′21″N 112°14′19″W
  - elevation: 4,810 ft (1,470 m)
- Length: 58 mi (93 km)

Beaver Creek is a 58-mile (93 km) long tributary of Camas Creek in the U.S. state of Idaho. Beginning at an elevation of 7,367 feet (2,245 m) near Monida Pass in northern Clark County, it flows generally south through the communities of Humphrey, Spencer, and Dubois. Continuing into Jefferson County, it reaches its mouth north of the town of Hamer, at an elevation of 4,810 feet (1,466 m). It is roughly paralleled by Interstate 15 for its entire length.

== See also ==
- List of rivers of Idaho
- List of longest streams of Idaho
