= Virginia, Idaho =

Unincorporated community in the state of Idaho, United States

- Unincorporated community
- Location within Idaho Location within the United States
- Coordinates: 42°29′39″N 112°09′56″W
- Country: United States
- State: Idaho
- County: Bannock
- Elevation: 4,800 ft (1,500 m)
- Time zone: UTC-7 (Mountain (MST))
  - Summer (DST): UTC-6 (MDT)
- ZIP code: 83234
- Area codes: 208, 986
- GNIS feature ID: 397295

Virginia is an unincorporated community in Bannock County, Idaho. It is located at the junction of Interstate 15 and U.S. Route 91 south of Arimo. It shares its zip code, 83234, with Downey.
