= Idaho State Highway 40 =

State highway in Bannock County, Idaho, United States

State Highway 40
- SH-40 highlighted in red

Route information
- Maintained by ITD
- Length: 2.737 mi (4.405 km)

Major junctions
- West end: I-15 west of Downey
- East end: US 91 in Downey

Location
- Country: United States
- State: Idaho
- Counties: Bannock

Highway system
- Idaho State Highway System; Interstate; US; State
← SH-39	→ SH-41

State Highway 40 (SH-40) is a 2.737-mile-long (4.405 km) state highway in Bannock County, Idaho, United States, that serves the city of Downey. The highway travels due east from an interchange with Interstate 15 (I-15) to an intersection with U.S. Route 91 (US-91) in Downey.

== Route description ==
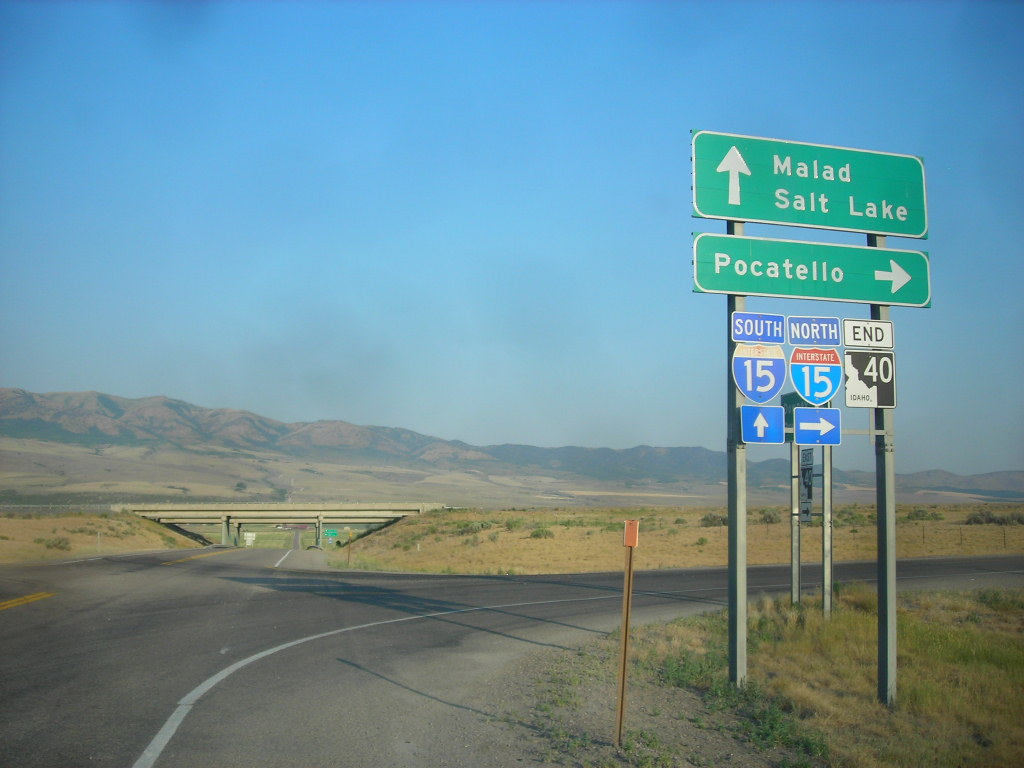
SH-40 at its western terminus, an interchange with Interstate 15, July 2007

SH-40 begins at a diamond interchange on I-15 (Exit 31) in rural Bannock County, about 18 miles (29 km) north of Malad City and about 39 miles (63 km) south of Pocatello. (The road continues due west from the interchange as East Treasure Lane for about 1.4 miles [2.3 km] to end at a T intersection with South Marsh Valley Road.) From its western terminus SH-40, known locally as Woodland Road, travels due east towards Downey and immediately passes the just north of the Flags West Truck Stop.

About 1.7 miles (2.7 km) along its course through agricultural area, SH-40 has an intersection with two dirt roads, South Race Track Road (which heads north) and South Olson Road (which heads south). Just beyond the intersection SH-40 passes along the north side of an Idaho Transportation Department (ITD) maintenance yard. The highway then connects with the north end of Barnes Lane (a short gravel road. A little farther on, SH-40 finally enters the city limits of Downey, just before reaching its eastern terminus at a T Intersection with US-91. (Two sets of Union Pacific Railroad tracks run along the east side of US-91 though Downey.)

== Traffic ==
Every year, the ITD conducts a series of surveys on its highways in the state to measure traffic volume. This is expressed in terms of average annual daily traffic (AADT), which is a measure of traffic volume for any average day of the year. In 2018, ITD calculated that 1,400 vehicles traveled the on highway. The highest traffic section is the first approximately 1,000 feet (300 m) east of I-15, which would include traffic between I-15 and the Flags West Truck Stop. The lowest traffic section was the eastern end (from the intersection with South Race Track Road/South Olson Road to the US-91), which had an AADT of only 550 vehicles. The posted speed limit for the entire length of the highway is 65 miles per hour (105 km/h).

== Major intersections ==
The entire route is in Bannock County.

Location	mi	km	Destinations	Notes
	0.000	0.000	I-15 – Malad, Salt Lake City, Pocatello	Western terminus; diamond interchange; I-15 Exit 31; road continues as County Road (Treasure Lane)
Downey	2.737	4.405	US 91 – Pocatello, Preston, Logan	Eastern terminus; T intersection
1.000 mi = 1.609 km; 1.000 km = 0.621 mi

== See also ==
- List of state highways in Idaho
