= Pebble Creek, Idaho =

Ski area in Idaho, United States

Pebble Creek
- Location in Idaho Pebble Creek (the United States)
- Location: Caribou National Forest; Bannock County, Idaho, U.S.
- Nearest city: Inkom; Pocatello
- Coordinates: 42.778°N 112.160°W
- Vertical: 2,911 ft (887 m); 2,200 ft (671 m) - lifts
- Top elevation: 9,271 ft (2,826 m); 8,560 ft (2,609 m) - lifts
- Base elevation: 6,360 ft (1,939 m)
- Skiable area: 1,100 acres (4.5 km^{2})
- Trails: 54 - 12% beginner: 35% intermediate; 53% advanced
- Longest run: 1.1 miles (1.8 km)
- Lift system: 3 triple chairlifts
- Snowfall: 250 inches (640 cm)
- Snowmaking: lower runs added 1990s
- Night skiing: Aspen beginner area Friday & Saturday nights, January to March. hours
- Website: Pebble Creek

Pebble Creek is an alpine ski area in the western United States, located in southeastern Idaho in the Portneuf Range in the Caribou National Forest. It is east of Pocatello in eastern Bannock County, four miles (6 km) east of Inkom. It is currently owned by Internet personality Shay Butler.

Pebble Creek's runs are on the northwestern slope of Bonneville Peak (a.k.a. Mount Bonneville), whose summit is 9,271 feet (2,826 m) above sea level, the highest elevation in the Portneuf Range. The lift-served summit is 8,560 feet (2,609 m), with a vertical drop of 2,200 ft (671 m). Accessing the summit of Bonneville Peak by foot is allowed, gaining 711 vertical feet (216 m), giving a total vertical drop of 2,911 ft (887 m). The mountain is named after Benjamin Bonneville, a U.S. Army officer who explored the Intermountain West in the 1830s.

The ski area opened 77 years ago in 1949 as Skyline, with two rope tows and a warming hut. A Poma lift was installed in 1958, and another in 1960. The first chairlift (double) was installed in 1966 which opened steeper terrain, and the current day lodge was built in 1968.

The area was sold in 1978 and again a year later to the Pebble Creek Land Company, which changed the area's name to Pebble Creek in 1979. The CTEC triple chairlift was added in 1980, with additional terrain, and the area was sold again in 1981 to Pebble Creek Ski Area Ltd., a group of local investors. In 2001, the old Minor-Denver double chair was replaced with a triple which extended the lift-served summit an additional 200 vertical feet (61 m).

Currently, Pebble Creek has three chairlifts (all triples) serving 1,100 acres (4.5 km^{2}) of skiable terrain, rated at 12% beginner, 35% intermediate, and 53% advanced. The average annual snowfall is 250 inches (640 cm). Snowmaking was added in the lower areas of the mountain in the 1990s.

While Pebble Creek may be a relatively unknown area, it has previously been listed as one of the top 30 ski areas in the SNoBoard Magazines's annual "Where to ride guide" (volume 5, issue 2).
