= Clark County Sheriff's Department =

Clark County Sheriff's Department can refer to the following law enforcement units:

- Clark County Sheriff's Department (Illinois) - Clark County, Illinois
- Clark County Sheriff's Department (Kentucky) - Clark County, Kentucky
- Clark County Sheriff's Department (Nevada) - Clark County, Nevada
- Clark County Sheriff's Department (Washington) - Clark County, Washington
- Clark County Sheriff's Department - Clark County, Wisconsin

Additionally, Clark County Sheriff's Department may refer to:

- Clark County Sheriff's Office (Arkansas) - Clark County, Arkansas
- Clark County Sheriff's Office (Idaho) - Clark County, Idaho
- Clark County Sheriff's Office (Kansas) - Clark County, Kansas
- Clark County Sheriff's Office (Missouri) - Clark County, Missouri
- Clark County Sheriff's Office (Ohio) - Clark County, Ohio
- Clarke County Sheriff Office (Alabama) - Clarke County, Alabama
- Clarke County Sheriff's Office (Georgia) - Clarke County, Georgia
- Lewis and Clark County Sheriff's Office - Lewis and Clark County, Montana
