= Woodruff, Idaho =

Unincorporated community in Oneida County, Idaho, United States

- Unincorporated community
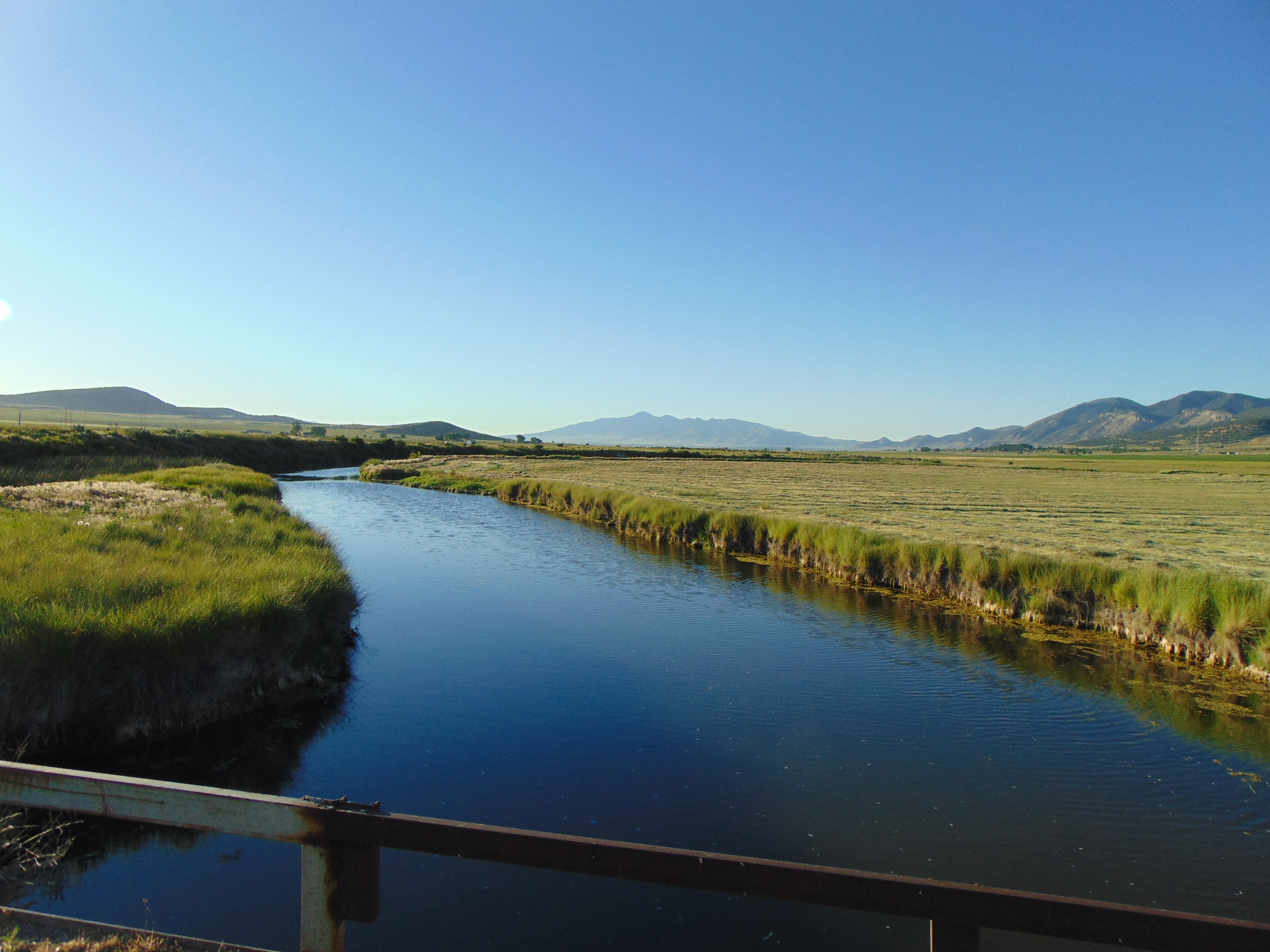
- Malad River in Woodruff

- Location within the state of Idaho Woodruff, Idaho (the United States)
- Coordinates: 42°02′10″N 112°12′53″W
- Country: United States
- State: Idaho
- County: Oneida
- Elevation: 4,485 ft (1,367 m)
- Time zone: UTC-7 (Mountain (MST))
  - Summer (DST): UTC-6 (MDT)
- ZIP codes: 83252
- Area codes: 208, 986
- GNIS feature ID: 398384

Woodruff is an unincorporated community in southeastern Oneida County, Idaho, United States.

== Description ==
The community is located in the Malad Valley, along the Malad River and Interstate 15, 10 mi (16 km) south of Malad City.

== History ==
The first settlement at Woodruff was made in 1865. A post office called Woodruff was established in 1894, and remained in operation until 1909. The community was named in honor of Wilford Woodruff, 4th President of The Church of Jesus Christ of Latter-day Saints.
