= Humphrey, Idaho =

Unincorporated community in the state of Idaho, United States

- Unincorporated community
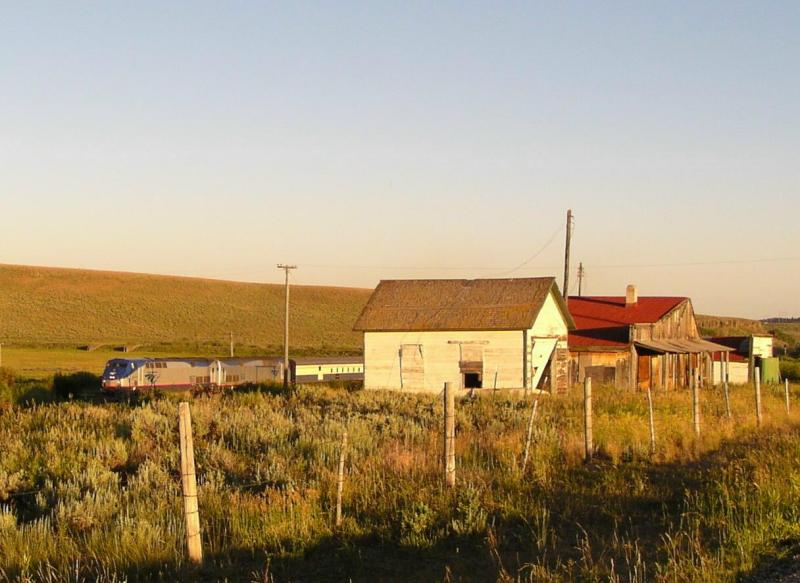
- The American Orient Express passes through Humphrey

- Location within Idaho Location within the United States
- Coordinates: 44°29′18″N 112°14′01″W
- Country: United States
- State: Idaho
- County: Clark
- Elevation: 6,529 ft (1,990 m)
- Time zone: UTC-7 (Mountain (MST))
  - Summer (DST): UTC-6 (MDT)
- Area codes: 208, 986
- GNIS feature ID: 397805

Humphrey is an unincorporated community in Clark County, Idaho, United States. Humphrey is located along Interstate 15 near the Monida Pass, 9.1 miles (14.6 km) north-northwest of Spencer.

== History ==
Humphrey's population was 25 in 1960.
