= Downey, Idaho =

City in Bannock County, Idaho, United States

- City
- Location of Downey in Bannock County, Idaho.
- Coordinates: 42°25′45″N 112°07′32″W
- Country: United States
- State: Idaho
- County: Bannock

Area
  - Total: 0.98 sq mi (2.53 km^{2})
  - Land: 0.98 sq mi (2.53 km^{2})
  - Water: 0 sq mi (0.00 km^{2})
- Elevation: 4,682 ft (1,427 m)

Population (2020)
  - Total: 571
  - Estimate (2023): 570
  - Density: 647/sq mi (249.8/km^{2})
- Time zone: UTC-7 (Mountain (MST))
  - Summer (DST): UTC-6 (MDT)
- ZIP code: 83234
- Area codes: 208, 986
- FIPS code: 16-22600
- GNIS feature ID: 2410353
- Website: www.downeyidaho.us

Downey is a city in the Marsh Valley in southern Bannock County, Idaho, United States. It is part of the Pocatello Metropolitan Statistical Area. The population was 571 at the 2020 census.

The community was reportedly named after one Mr. Downey, a director of the Union Pacific Railroad. However, researchers have been unable to verify the existence of said Mr. Downey. Notwithstanding, some have asserted he was a track worker, not a director.

== Geography ==
Downey is located in Marsh Valley. It lies on the route of U.S. Highway 91.

According to the United States Census Bureau, the city has a total area of 0.99 square miles (2.56 km^{2}), all of it land.

== Demographics ==
Historical population
| Census | Pop. | Note | %± |
|---|---|---|---|
| 1920 | 522 | | — |
| 1930 | 553 | | 5.9% |
| 1940 | 673 | | 21.7% |
| 1950 | 748 | | 11.1% |
| 1960 | 726 | | −2.9% |
| 1970 | 586 | | −19.3% |
| 1980 | 645 | | 10.1% |
| 1990 | 626 | | −2.9% |
| 2000 | 613 | | −2.1% |
| 2010 | 625 | | 2.0% |
| 2020 | 571 | | −8.6% |
| 2023 (est.) | 570 | | −0.2% |
U.S. Decennial Census

=== 2010 census ===
As of the census of 2010, there were 625 people, 255 households, and 168 families residing in the city. The population density was 631.3 inhabitants per square mile (243.7/km^{2}). There were 290 housing units at an average density of 292.9 per square mile (113.1/km^{2}). The racial makeup of the city was 98.1% White, 0.2% Native American, 0.8% Pacific Islander, 0.5% from other races, and 0.5% from two or more races. Hispanic or Latino of any race were 1.6% of the population.

There were 255 households, of which 27.1% had children under the age of 18 living with them, 55.3% were married couples living together, 5.1% had a female householder with no husband present, 5.5% had a male householder with no wife present, and 34.1% were non-families. 30.6% of all households were made up of individuals, and 19.6% had someone living alone who was 65 years of age or older. The average household size was 2.45, and the average family size was 3.13.

The median age in the city was 47.1 years. 27.2% of residents were under the age of 18; 5% were between the ages of 18 and 24; 16.6% were from 25 to 44; 26.8% were from 45 to 64; and 24.6% were 65 years of age or older. The gender makeup of the city was 49.8% male and 50.2% female.

=== 2000 census ===
As of the census of 2000, there were 613 people, 233 households, and 165 families residing in the city. The population density was 622.8 inhabitants per square mile (240.5/km^{2}). There were 264 housing units at an average density of 268.2 per square mile (103.6/km^{2}). The racial makeup of the city was 97.39% White, 0.49% Native American, 0.16% Asian, 0.49% Pacific Islander, 1.31% from other races, and 0.16% from two or more races. Hispanic or Latino of any race were 1.63% of the population.

There were 233 households, out of which 32.2% had children under the age of 18 living with them, 61.8% were married couples living together, 6.0% had a female householder with no husband present, and 28.8% were non-families. 27.0% of all households were made up of individuals, and 18.9% had someone living alone who was 65 years of age or older. The average household size was 2.63, and the average family size was 3.23.

In the city, the population was spread out, with 30.5% under the age of 18, 5.9% from 18 to 24, 22.2% from 25 to 44, 17.0% from 45 to 64, and 24.5% who were 65 years of age or older. The median age was 39 years. For every 100 females, there were 97.1 males. For every 100 females age 18 and over, there were 94.5 males.

The median income for a household in the city was $26,667, and the median income for a family was $34,432. Males had a median income of $30,781 versus $20,500 for females. The per capita income for the city was $11,908. About 12.7% of families and 18.6% of the population were below the poverty line, including 25.7% of those under age 18 and 14.6% of those age 65 or over.

== Education ==
Downey is part of the Marsh Valley School Joint District #21 and is served by three schools:

- Downey Elementary School, located in Downey
- Marsh Valley Middle School, located just north of Arimo
- Marsh Valley High School, located just north of Arimo

== Transportation ==
Downey is served by one U.S. Highway and one state highway:

- US 91, which passes southwest to northwest through the city
- SH-40, which runs west from the city to connect with Interstate 15

== See also ==
- Red Rock Pass
