= Pocatello metropolitan area =

Metropolitan Statistical Area in the United States

Pocatello, Idaho Metro Area
- Metropolitan Statistical Area
- Pocatello, ID Metropolitan Statistical Area
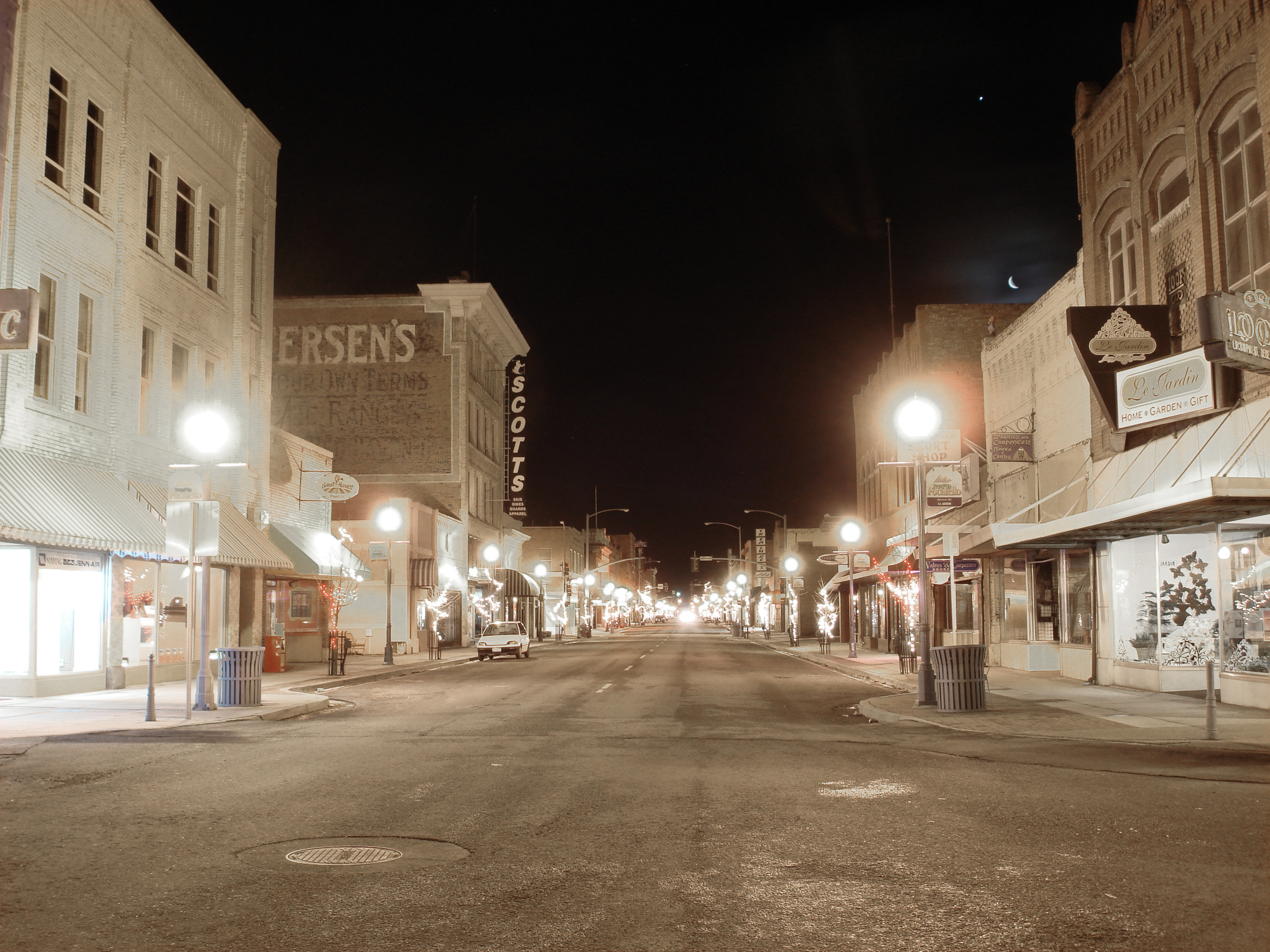
- Main Street in Pocatello
Interactive map of Pocatello, ID MSA
City of Pocatello
Pocatello, ID MSA
- Country: United States
- State: Idaho
- Principal city: Pocatello
- Other city: Chubbuck
- Time zone: UTC-7 (MST)
  - Summer (DST): UTC-6 (MDT)

The Pocatello Metropolitan Statistical Area, as defined by the United States Census Bureau, is an area consisting of Bannock and Power counties in eastern Idaho, anchored by the city of Pocatello. As of the 2010 census, the MSA had a population of 82,839. Power County was added back to the Pocatello MSA as of April 10, 2018. It is just south of the Idaho Falls metropolitan area.

== Counties ==
- Bannock
- Power

== Communities ==
- Places with more than 50,000 inhabitants
  - Pocatello (Principal City)
- Places with 10,000 to 50,000 inhabitants
  - Chubbuck
- Places with 1,000 to 10,000 inhabitants
- American Falls
  - Fort Hall (census-designated place)
- Places with 500 to 1,000 inhabitants
  - Downey
  - Inkom
  - Lava Hot Springs
  - McCammon
- Places with less than 500 inhabitants
  - Arimo

== Demographics ==
As of the census of 2000, there were 83,103 people, 29,752 households, and 21,192 families residing within the MSA. The racial makeup of the MSA was 90.61% White, 0.55% African American, 2.94% Native American, 0.93% Asian, 0.15% Pacific Islander, 2.89% from other races, and 1.93% from two or more races. Hispanic or Latino of any race were 6.23% of the population.

The median income for a household in the MSA was $34,455, and the median income for a family was $40,439. Males had a median income of $32,866 versus $22,263 for females. The per capita income for the MSA was $15,578.

== See also ==
- Idaho census statistical areas
