= Woodville, Idaho =

Unincorporated community Bingham County, Idaho, United States

- Unincorporated community
- Location in Idaho Location in the United States
- Coordinates: 43°25′01″N 112°08′34″W
- Country: United States
- State: Idaho
- County: Bingham
- Elevation: 4,369 ft (1,332 m)
- Time zone: UTC-7 (Mountain (MST))
  - Summer (DST): UTC-6 (MDT)
- Area codes: 208, 986
- GNIS feature ID: 398385

Woodville is an unincorporated community in Bingham County, in the U.S. state of Idaho.

== History ==
The first settlement at Woodville was made in 1889. A post office called Woodville was established in 1901, and remained in operation until 1905. The name "Woodville" was applied to the place because a large share of the first settlers were employed hauling wood.
