= Monida Pass =

Mountain pass in United States

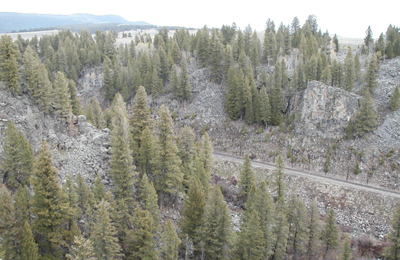
- Beaver Canyon

- Location within the United States Location within Idaho
- Elevation: 6,870 ft (2,090 m)
- Traversed by: I-15

Third Approach
- Location: Beaverhead County, Montana / Clark County, Idaho, U.S.
- Range: Bitterroot Range, Rocky Mountains
- Coordinates: 44°33′31″N 112°18′20″W

Monida Pass is a high mountain pass in the northern Rocky Mountains of the western United States, at an elevation of 6,870 feet (2,094 m) above sea level on Interstate 15, and 6,820 feet (2,079 m) on the Union Pacific Railroad.

On the Continental Divide in the Bitterroot Range, it marks the transition between the Beaverhead Mountains and the Centennial Mountains. Its name is derived from the states that it separates, "Mon" from Montana and "-ida" from Idaho.

The pass forms part of the border between eastern Idaho and southwestern Montana, and is between the towns of Spencer in Clark County and Lima in Beaverhead County. On the Idaho side is Beaver Creek running through Beaver Canyon, which was the route of the Utah and Northern Railway in 1880 and is still used by Union Pacific.

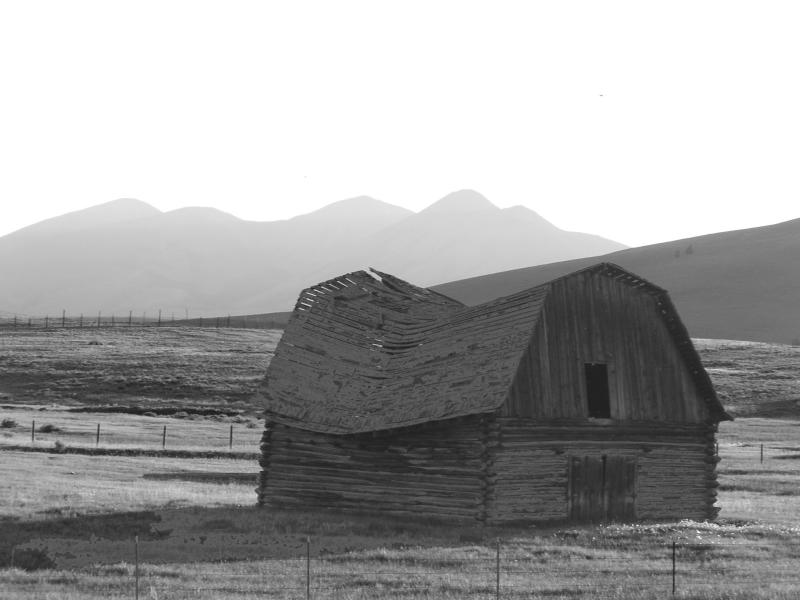
A disused barn on Monida Pass

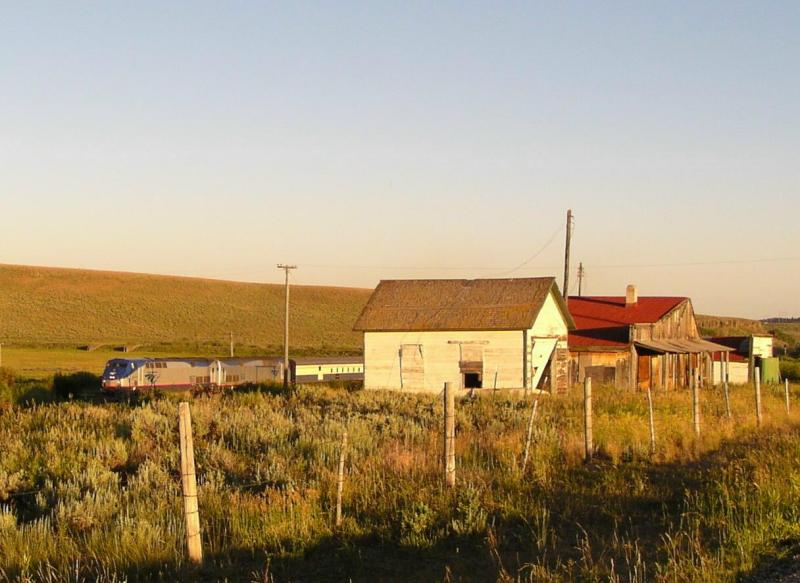
Humphrey, Idaho

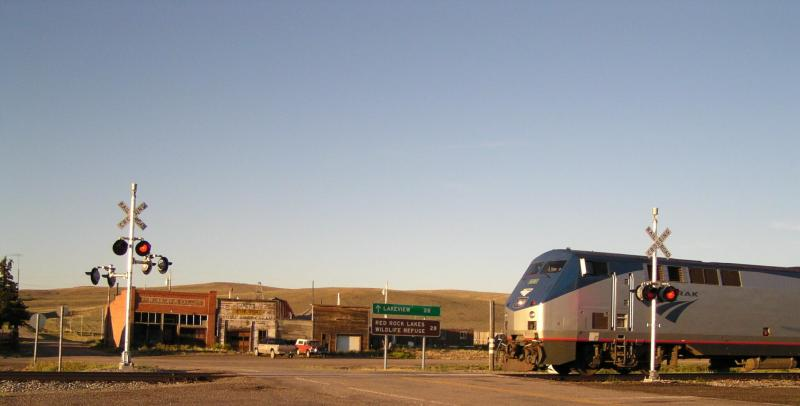
Monida, Montana

Union Pacific once had an icemaking plant at Humphrey, Idaho, which is now a ghost town; Monida, Montana, which is near the top of the pass, is also almost a ghost town, as only seven people now live there at 6,780 feet (2,067 m), ninety feet (27 m) below the pass on I-15.

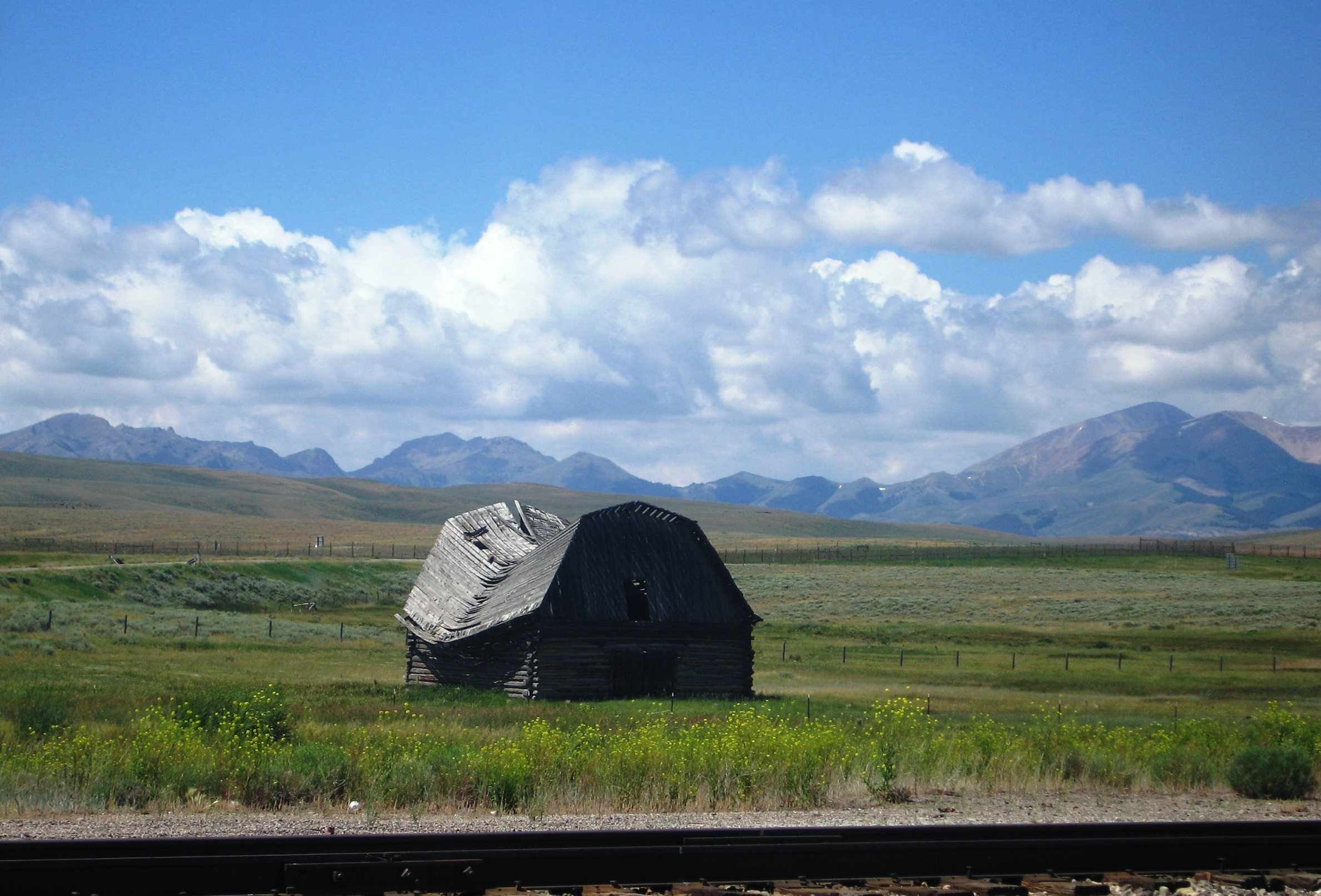
2008 photo of Stage Coach Barn for travel north to Dillon and east to Yellowstone

In the late 19th century, stagecoaches ferried tourists from the railroad at Monida Pass to Yellowstone National Park, until UP built a branch line to the park over Reas Pass. Interstate 15, the "Veterans Memorial Highway," runs through the pass and north to the international boundary with Canada at Sweetgrass.

== See also ==
- Mountain passes in Montana
