= Marsh Valley High School =

Location
- 12655 South Highway 91; Arimo, Idaho 83214-1613; United States; 42°34′51″N 112°10′49″W

Information
- Type: Public
- School district: Marsh Valley School Joint District#21
- Superintendent: Gary Tucker
- Principal: Wyatt Hansen
- Faculty: 19
- Teaching staff: 19 (FTE) (2023–2024)
- Grades: 9-12
- Enrollment: 300 (2023–2024)
- Student to teacher ratio: 16.28 (2023–2024)
- Colors: Red; White; Columbia Blue
- Mascot: Eagles
- Newspaper: Eagle Eye News
- Feeder schools: Marsh Valley Middle School
- IHSAA Division: 3A
- Website: www.mvsd21.org/page/marsh-valley-high-school

Marsh Valley High School is a public high school in the Marsh Valley in Bannock County, Idaho, United States, just north of Arimo. The school is part of the Marsh Valley School Joint District#21. The school's address is 12805 S Old Highway 91 Arimo, Idaho 83214-1613.

== Student exchange ==
- Schlossgymnasium (Castle Grammar School) in Kirchheim unter Teck, Germany

== Notable faculty ==
- Bert Marley, member of the Idaho House of Representatives and Idaho Senate

== See also ==
- List of high schools in Idaho
