= Clark County, Idaho =

County in Idaho, United States

- County
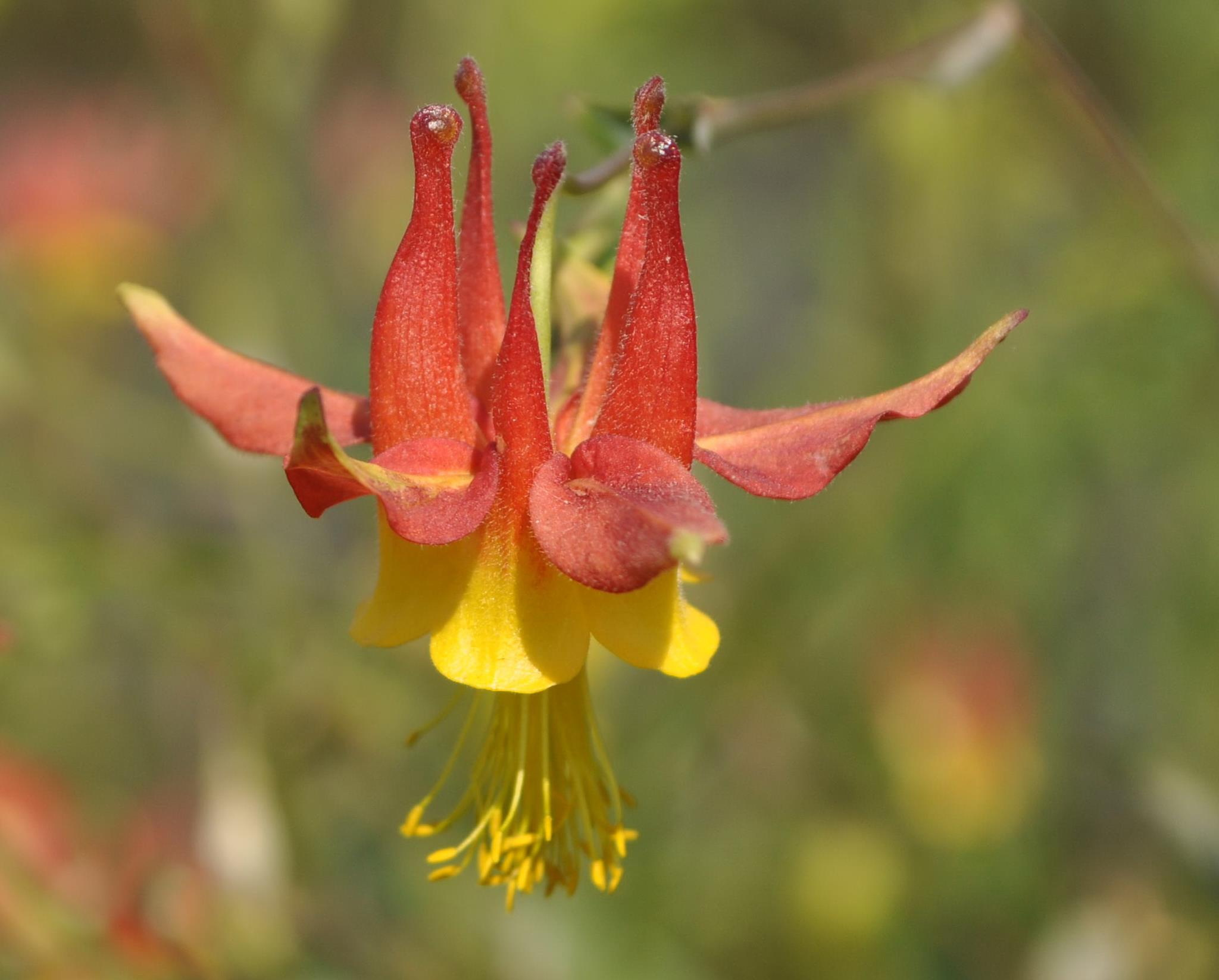
- Aquilegia at Nez Perce National Historic Trail

- Seal

- Location within the U.S. state of Idaho
- Coordinates: 44°17′N 112°23′W
- Country: United States
- State: Idaho
- Founded: February 1, 1919
- Named for: Sam K. Clark (1857–1933), state senator & pioneer
- Seat: Dubois
- Largest city: Dubois

Area
  - Total: 1,765 sq mi (4,570 km^{2})
  - Land: 1,764 sq mi (4,570 km^{2})
  - Water: 1.0 sq mi (2.6 km^{2}) 0.1%

Population (2020)
  - Total: 790
  - Estimate (2025): 783 ▼
  - Density: 0.56/sq mi (0.22/km^{2})
- Time zone: UTC−7 (Mountain)
  - Summer (DST): UTC−6 (MDT)
- Congressional district: 2nd
- Website: www.clark-co.id.gov

Clark County is a rural county in the U.S. state of Idaho; its county seat and largest city is Dubois. As of the 2020 census, the population was 790, making it the least populous county in the state.

== History ==
Establishment of stage coach stops along the route between Salt Lake City and the Montana mining towns were established at Beaver Canyon (named after Beaver Creek (Camas Creek) ) and Dry Creek (now Dubois) in 1864. Originally part of Alturas County, both locations were transferred to Oneida County in 1877. They became part of Bingham County at its creation in 1885. Clark County was also the site of the Battle of Camas Creek during the Nez Perce War which occurred at Camas Meadows near Kilgore on August 20, 1872. The Utah and Northern Railway reached Beaver Canyon in 1879. By the 1890 Census, Beaver Canyon had a population of 216. The settlement relocated to Spencer in 1897.

The majority of Clark County was transferred to Fremont County when it was created in 1893 with the remaining territory being transferred in 1896. By the 1900 Census, 1,199 residents lived in the five precincts of Birch Creek, Dubois, Kilgore, Medicine Lodge, and Spencer. At the 1910 census, the precincts contained 1,095 residents.

Dry Creek was renamed Dubois in 1892 and incorporated prior to 1920, while Spencer was incorporated in 1947.

The county was established 107 years ago in 1919, partitioned from Fremont County by the state legislature; the county division bill was signed by Governor D. W. Davis on February 1. It was named for state senator Sam K. Clark, an early pioneer on Medicine Lodge Creek in the upper Snake River valley.

== Geography ==
According to the United States Census Bureau, the county has a total area of 1,765 square miles (4,570 km^{2}), of which 1,764 square miles (4,570 km^{2}) is land and 1.0 square mile (2.6 km^{2}) (0.1%) is water.

The northern border of the county is the Bitterroot Range of the Rocky Mountains, which forms the state line with Montana and is also the continental divide. It is crossed by Interstate 15 over Monida Pass at 6,820 feet (2,080 m) above sea level. Monida Pass also marks an east–west divide between Bitterroot subranges: the Beaverhead Mountains are to the west and the Centennial Mountains are to the east.

=== Adjacent counties ===
- Lemhi County – west
- Butte County – southwest
- Jefferson County – south
- Fremont County – east
- Beaverhead County, Montana – north

=== Major highways ===
- Interstate 15 – Monida Pass
- SH-22

=== National protected areas ===
- Caribou-Targhee National Forest (part)
- Nez Perce National Historical Park (part)
- Salmon-Challis National Forest (part)

== Demographics ==
Historical population
Census	Pop.	Note	%±
1920	1,886		—
1930	1,122		−40.5%
1940	1,005		−10.4%
1950	918		−8.7%
1960	915		−0.3%
1970	741		−19.0%
1980	798		7.7%
1990	762		−4.5%
2000	1,022		34.1%
2010	982		−3.9%
2020	790		−19.6%
2025 (est.)	783	▼	−0.9%
U.S. Decennial Census; 1790–1960 1900–1990; 1990–2000 2010–2020

=== Racial and ethnic composition ===
Clark County, Idaho – Racial and ethnic composition Note: the US Census treats Hispanic/Latino as an ethnic category. This table excludes Latinos from the racial categories and assigns them to a separate category. Hispanics/Latinos may be of any race.
Race / Ethnicity (NH = Non-Hispanic)	Pop 1980	Pop 1990	Pop 2000	Pop 2010	Pop 2020	% 1980	% 1990	% 2000	% 2010	% 2020
White alone (NH)	765	678	653	558	463	95.86%	88.98%	63.89%	56.82%	58.61%
Black or African American alone (NH)	0	0	1	2	3	0.00%	0.00%	0.10%	0.20%	0.38%
Native American or Alaska Native alone (NH)	3	5	10	6	2	0.38%	0.66%	0.98%	0.61%	0.25%
Asian alone (NH)	0	0	2	5	1	0.00%	0.00%	0.20%	0.51%	0.13%
Native Hawaiian or Pacific Islander alone (NH)	x	x	1	0	0	x	x	0.10%	0.00%	0.00%
Other race alone (NH)	0	0	0	2	2	0.00%	0.00%	0.00%	0.20%	0.25%
Mixed race or Multiracial (NH)	x	x	5	11	31	x	x	0.49%	1.12%	3.92%
Hispanic or Latino (any race)	30	79	350	398	288	3.76%	10.37%	34.25%	40.53%	36.46%
Total	798	762	1,022	982	790	100.00%	100.00%	100.00%	100.00%	100.00%

=== 2020 census ===
As of the 2020 census, there were 790 people living in the county. The median age was 37.9 years, 26.6% of residents were under the age of 18, and 19.2% were 65 years of age or older. For every 100 females there were 105.2 males, and for every 100 females age 18 and over there were 105.7 males.

The racial makeup of the county was 63.0% White, 1.3% Black or African American, 0.3% American Indian and Alaska Native, 0.1% Asian, 0.0% Native Hawaiian and Pacific Islander, 22.2% from some other race, and 13.2% from two or more races. Hispanic or Latino residents of any race comprised 36.5% of the population.

0.0% of residents lived in urban areas, while 100.0% lived in rural areas.

There were 316 households in the county, of which 37.0% had children under the age of 18 living with them and 20.6% had a female householder with no spouse or partner present. About 25.6% of all households were made up of individuals and 12.0% had someone living alone who was 65 years of age or older.

There were 483 housing units, of which 34.6% were vacant. Among occupied housing units, 69.6% were owner-occupied and 30.4% were renter-occupied. The homeowner vacancy rate was 0.9% and the rental vacancy rate was 0.0%.

=== 2010 census ===
As of the 2010 census, there were 982 people, 345 households, and 243 families living in the county. The population density was 0.6 inhabitants per square mile (0.23/km^{2}). There were 531 housing units at an average density of 0.3 per square mile (0.12/km^{2}). The racial makeup of the county was 72.4% white, 1.0% American Indian, 0.7% black or African American, 0.5% Asian, 23.8% from other races, and 1.5% from two or more races. Those of Hispanic or Latino origin made up 40.5% of the population. In terms of ancestry, 14.8% were English, 7.4% were German, and 6.5% were American.

Of the 345 households, 37.7% had children under the age of 18 living with them, 57.4% were married couples living together, 7.0% had a female householder with no husband present, 29.6% were non-families, and 24.3% of all households were made up of individuals. The average household size was 2.84 and the average family size was 3.41. The median age was 32.7 years.

The median income for a household in the county was $40,909 and the median income for a family was $37,656. Males had a median income of $32,895 versus $24,125 for females. The per capita income for the county was $19,737. About 8.7% of families and 11.3% of the population were below the poverty line, including 21.5% of those under age 18 and 5.9% of those age 65 or over.

=== 2000 census ===
As of the 2000 census, there were 1,022 people, 340 households, and 257 families living in the county. The population density was 1 person per square mile (0.39 person/km^{2}). There were 521 housing units at an average density of 0 per square mile (0/km^{2}). The racial makeup of the county was 74.17% White, 0.10% Black or African American, 0.98% Native American, 0.20% Asian, 0.10% Pacific Islander, 23.48% from other races, and 0.98% from two or more races. 34.25% of the population were Hispanic or Latino of any race. 14.3% were of English, 8.1% German and 5.8% Irish ancestry.

There were 340 households, out of which 45.00% had children under the age of 18 living with them, 61.80% were married couples living together, 7.10% had a female householder with no husband present, and 24.40% were non-families. 20.00% of all households were made up of individuals, and 8.50% had someone living alone who was 65 years of age or older. The average household size was 3.01 and the average family size was 3.52.

In the county, the population was spread out, with 35.20% under the age of 18, 8.00% from 18 to 24, 27.50% from 25 to 44, 20.10% from 45 to 64, and 9.20% who were 65 years of age or older. The median age was 31 years. For every 100 females there were 110.70 males. For every 100 females age 18 and over, there were 112.20 males.

The median income for a household in the county was $31,576, and the median income for a family was $31,534. Males had a median income of $23,854 versus $20,192 for females. The per capita income for the county was $11,141. About 18.70% of families and 19.90% of the population were below the poverty line, including 24.10% of those under age 18 and 11.70% of those age 65 or over.

== Education ==
The sole school district in the county is Clark County School District #161, headquartered in Dubois. Clark County High School competes in athletics in the Rocky Mountain Conference in IHSAA 1A Division II; the school colors are orange and black and its mascot is a bobcat.

The College of Eastern Idaho includes this county in its catchment zone; however, this county is not in its taxation zone.

== Communities ==
=== Incorporated communities ===
- Dubois (county seat)
- Spencer

=== Unincorporated communities ===
- Humphrey
- Kilgore

== Politics ==
=== Presidential elections ===
Clark County has participated in every presidential election since 1920. The county has voted for every Republican candidate, except in 1932 when it gave Democratic candidate Franklin D. Roosevelt 54% of the vote. It was the only county in Idaho, and one of only three counties west of the Continental Divide alongside Rio Blanco County, Colorado and Kane County, Utah to give at least a plurality to Alf Landon in his 1936 landslide defeat.

United States presidential election results for Clark County, Idaho
Year	Republican		Democratic		Third party(ies)	
Year	No.	%	No.	%	No.	%
1920	594	76.25%	184	23.62%	1	0.13%
1924	496	69.47%	43	6.02%	175	24.51%
1928	388	74.90%	129	24.90%	1	0.19%
1932	276	45.85%	325	53.99%	1	0.17%
1936	304	52.41%	272	46.90%	4	0.69%
1940	399	65.30%	212	34.70%	0	0.00%
1944	317	63.53%	180	36.07%	2	0.40%
1948	262	60.65%	165	38.19%	5	1.16%
1952	382	75.20%	126	24.80%	0	0.00%
1956	318	67.80%	151	32.20%	0	0.00%
1960	283	61.66%	176	38.34%	0	0.00%
1964	262	58.48%	186	41.52%	0	0.00%
1968	271	66.58%	87	21.38%	49	12.04%
1972	339	74.34%	64	14.04%	53	11.62%
1976	334	64.48%	169	32.63%	15	2.90%
1980	379	78.47%	87	18.01%	17	3.52%
1984	353	85.06%	59	14.22%	3	0.72%
1988	281	66.75%	133	31.59%	7	1.66%
1992	195	46.10%	95	22.46%	133	31.44%
1996	266	61.29%	117	26.96%	51	11.75%
2000	311	81.41%	63	16.49%	8	2.09%
2004	302	85.55%	46	13.03%	5	1.42%
2008	305	81.33%	64	17.07%	6	1.60%
2012	235	71.65%	66	20.12%	27	8.23%
2016	203	71.73%	44	15.55%	36	12.72%
2020	264	84.89%	41	13.18%	6	1.93%
2024	280	84.08%	50	15.02%	3	0.90%

=== Voter registration ===
Clark County registered voters by political party (as of September 3, 2019)
Political party	Constitution	Democratic	Libertarian	Republican	Unaffiliated	Total registered voters
Number of registered voters	2	15	2	312	54	385

== Government ==
=== Federal ===
The county is represented in the United States House of Representatives by Republican Mike Simpson of the 2nd Congressional District. It is represented in the United States Senate by Republicans Mike Crapo and James Risch.

=== State ===
The county is in the 35th Legislative district. It is represented by Republican Senator Van Burtenshaw and Republican representatives Karey Hanks and Rod Furniss.

=== County ===
The county has three county commissioners: Nick Hillman, Greg Shenton, and Macoy Ward. Other officials include sheriff, county clerk, attorney, coroner, treasurer, and assessor.

== See also ==
- National Register of Historic Places listings in Clark County, Idaho
