= Malad River (Idaho-Utah) =

- Location of the mouth of the Malad River in Utah Malad River (Idaho-Utah) (the United States)

Location
- Country: United States
- State: Utah, Idaho
- Counties: Box Elder County, Utah, Oneida County, Idaho

Physical characteristics
- Source: Big Malad Spring
  - location: northwest of Malad City, Oneida County, Idaho
  - coordinates: 42°13′18″N 112°21′54″W
  - elevation: 4,728 ft (1,441 m)
- Mouth: Bear River
  - location: south of Bear River City, Box Elder County, Utah
  - coordinates: 41°35′10″N 112°07′03″W
  - elevation: 4,222 ft (1,287 m)
- Length: 97 mi (156 km)

The Malad River is a 97-mile long (156 km) tributary of the Bear River in southeastern Idaho and northern Utah in the western United States.

== Description ==
The river flows southward, beginning northwest of Malad City, Idaho, crosses the Idaho-Utah state line just north of Portage, Utah, flows through Tremonton, and empties into the Bear River just south of Bear River City.

Malad River was so named on account of the river making pioneers sick, malade meaning "sick" in French.

== See also ==
- List of rivers of Idaho
- List of rivers of Utah
- List of longest streams of Idaho
