= Black Pine, Idaho =

Extinct town in Idaho

Coordinates: 42°04′21″N 112°58′49″W

Black Pine is an extinct town in Oneida County, in the U.S. state of Idaho. The GNIS classifies it as a populated place.

== History ==
The community took its name from the nearby Black Pine Mountains.
