= Bear River City, Utah =

City in Utah, United States

- City
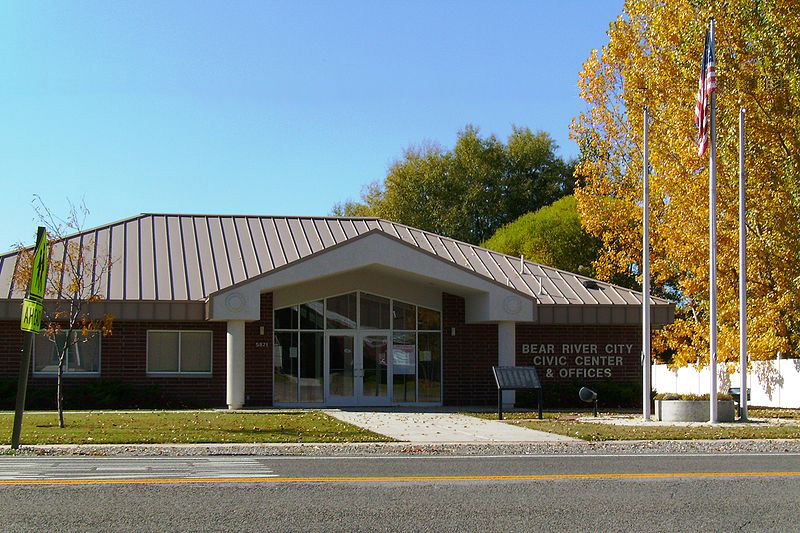
- Bear River City Civic Center and Offices

- Location in Box Elder County and the state of Utah.

- Location of Utah in the United States
- Coordinates: 41°36′50″N 112°07′35″W
- Country: United States
- State: Utah
- County: Box Elder
- Settled: 1866
- Incorporated: September 22, 1885
- Became a city: November 3, 2000
- Founded by: Anne Anderson
- Named after: Bear River

Area
  - Total: 1.80 sq mi (4.65 km^{2})
  - Land: 1.80 sq mi (4.65 km^{2})
  - Water: 0 sq mi (0.00 km^{2})
- Elevation: 4,259 ft (1,298 m)

Population (2020)
  - Total: 877
  - Density: 488/sq mi (189/km^{2})
- Time zone: UTC-7 (MST)
  - Summer (DST): UTC-6 (MDT)
- ZIP code: 84301
- Area code: 435
- FIPS code: 49-03950
- GNIS feature ID: 2409803
- Website: bearrivercityutah.gov

Bear River City is a city in Box Elder County, Utah, United States. The population was 877 at the 2020 census, up from the 2010 figure of 853. Bear River became a city under state law near the end of 2000. Although current state law requires a minimum population of 1000 for cities, Bear River City remains a city.

A group first settled Bear River City from Brigham City in 1866. The city took its name from the nearby Bear River.

== Demographics ==
Historical population
Census	Pop.	Note	%±
1870	317		—
1880	340		7.3%
1890	321		−5.6%
1900	390		21.5%
1910	648		66.2%
1920	490		−24.4%
1930	436		−11.0%
1940	429		−1.6%
1950	438		2.1%
1960	447		2.1%
1970	445		−0.4%
1980	540		21.3%
1990	700		29.6%
2000	750		7.1%
2010	853		13.7%
2020	877		2.8%
U.S. Decennial Census

=== 2020 census ===
As of the 2020 census, Bear River City had a population of 877. The median age was 38.1 years, with 30.6% of residents under the age of 18 and 15.2% aged 65 years or older. For every 100 females there were 115.5 males, and for every 100 females age 18 and over there were 105.1 males age 18 and over.

0.0% of residents lived in urban areas, while 100.0% lived in rural areas.

There were 292 households in Bear River City, of which 38.0% had children under the age of 18 living in them. Of all households, 71.6% were married-couple households, 10.3% were households with a male householder and no spouse or partner present, and 16.1% were households with a female householder and no spouse or partner present. About 17.8% of all households were made up of individuals and 8.9% had someone living alone who was 65 years of age or older.

There were 300 housing units, of which 2.7% were vacant. The homeowner vacancy rate was 0.0% and the rental vacancy rate was 3.7%.

Racial composition as of the 2020 census
Race	Number	Percent
White	823	93.8%
Black or African American	2	0.2%
American Indian and Alaska Native	12	1.4%
Asian	3	0.3%
Native Hawaiian and Other Pacific Islander	0	0.0%
Some other race	26	3.0%
Two or more races	11	1.3%
Hispanic or Latino (of any race)	44	5.0%

=== 2000 census ===
As of the 2000 census, there were 750 people, 226 households, and 195 families in the town. The population density was 477.5 people per square mile (184.4/km^{2}). There were 233 housing units at an average density of 148.4 per square mile (57.3/km^{2}). The racial makeup of the town was 96.27% White, 0.27% Native American, 2.27% from other races, and 1.20% from two or more races. Hispanic or Latino individuals of any race were 3.87% of the population.

There were 226 households, out of which 46.9% had children under the age of 18 living with them, 78.8% were married couples living together, 6.6% had a female householder with no husband present, and 13.3% were non-families. 12.4% of all households were made up of individuals, and 7.1% had someone living alone who was 65 years or older. The average household size was 3.32, and the average family size was 3.64.

In the town, the age distribution of the population shows 36.7% under 18, 8.0% from 18 to 24, 25.6% from 25 to 44, 19.3% from 45 to 64, and 10.4% who were 65 years of age or older. The median age was 30 years. For every 100 females, there were 110.1 males. For every 100 females aged 18 and over, there were 100.4 males.

The median income for a household in the town was $52,212, and the median income for a family was $55,833. Males had a median income of $40,417 versus $24,821 for females. The per capita income was $17,296. None of the population or families were below the poverty line.

== Geography ==
According to the United States Census Bureau, the town has a total area of 1.6 square miles (4.1 km^{2}), all land.

== Major landmarks ==
=== Schools ===
In 1912, the rapidly expanding Box Elder School District constructed a six-room elementary school in Bear River City. The building underwent a seven-classroom addition in 1999 before remodeling again in 2007. The latest remodeling to the school added new classrooms (for the fifth graders who had been in portables), a new bathroom, and a new library. Century Elementary holds approximately 800 students.

=== Churches ===
There is one church that is owned by the Church of Jesus Christ of Latter-day Saints.

=== Parks ===
The town park is located east of the church. It includes two playing fields, a playground, a small rodeo arena, an outdoor stage, a volleyball court, and a small shop used on special occasions. The town park is cared for by a local family.

=== Historical buildings ===
There are two buildings over 100 years old - an old town hall that was formerly a post office, and an old shop. There is an original pioneer log cabin, probably built in the 1850s, which serves as a museum and sits within the boundaries of the town park. This museum can be visited by appointment. At least one home on the corner northeast of the town park was built on remnants of the original Bear River Fort.

=== Retail locations ===
The Country Archer's, usually called The Little Store by locals, is the only retail shop.

=== Government buildings ===
The current post office is the third one in Bear River City. The original post office became the old town hall, and the second burned down.

== See also ==
- List of cities and towns in Utah
