= Bannock County, Idaho =

County in Idaho, United States

- County
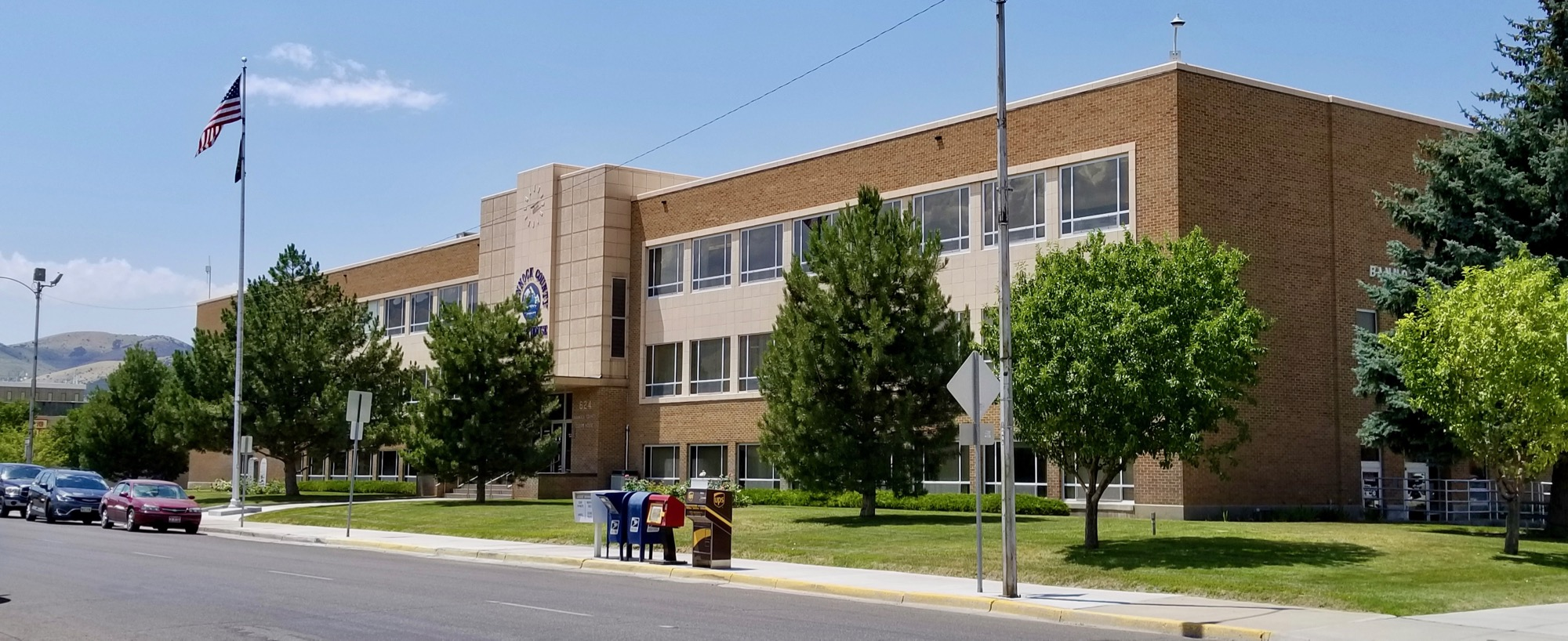
- Bannock County Courthouse in Pocatello

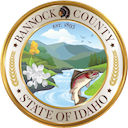
- Seal

- Location within the U.S. state of Idaho
- Coordinates: 42°40′N 112°13′W
- Country: United States
- State: Idaho
- Founded: March 6, 1893
- Named for: Bannock tribe
- Seat: Pocatello
- Largest city: Pocatello

Area
  - Total: 1,147 sq mi (2,970 km^{2})
  - Land: 1,112 sq mi (2,880 km^{2})
  - Water: 35 sq mi (91 km^{2}) 3.1%

Population (2020)
  - Total: 87,018
  - Estimate (2025): 91,591 ▲
  - Density: 76/sq mi (29/km^{2})
- Time zone: UTC−7 (Mountain)
  - Summer (DST): UTC−6 (MDT)
- Congressional district: 2nd
- Website: www.bannockcounty.gov

Bannock County is a county in the southeastern part of Idaho. As of the 2020 census, the population was 87,018, making it the sixth-most populous county in Idaho. The county seat and largest city is Pocatello. The county was established in 1893 and named after the local Bannock tribe. It is one of the counties with territories included in the Fort Hall Indian Reservation of the federally recognized Shoshone-Bannock Tribes.

The county would get international attention in 2006 when the murder of Cassie Jo Stoddart occurred in a home located in the area.

== Geography ==
According to the United States Census Bureau, the county has a total area of 1,147 square miles (2,970 km^{2}), of which 1,112 square miles (2,880 km^{2}) is land and 35 square miles (91 km^{2}) (3.1%) is water. The Portneuf River flows through the county, meeting the Snake River (the American Falls Reservoir) at the county's lowest point, its northwestern corner. Bonneville Peak, on the eastern border in the Portneuf Range, is the county's highest point at 9,271 feet (2,826 m) ASL; on its western slopes is the Pebble Creek ski area.

=== Adjacent counties ===
- Bingham County - north
- Caribou County - east
- Franklin County - southeast
- Oneida County - southwest
- Power County - west

=== Highways ===
- - Interstate 15
- - Interstate 86
- - US 30
- - US 91
- - SH-40

=== National protected area ===
- Caribou National Forest (part)

== Demographics ==
Historical population
Census	Pop.	Note	%±
1900	11,702		—
1910	19,242		64.4%
1920	27,532		43.1%
1930	31,266		13.6%
1940	34,759		11.2%
1950	41,745		20.1%
1960	49,342		18.2%
1970	52,200		5.8%
1980	65,421		25.3%
1990	66,026		0.9%
2000	75,565		14.4%
2010	82,839		9.6%
2020	87,018		5.0%
2025 (est.)	91,591	▲	5.3%
U.S. Decennial Census; 1790–1960, 1900–1990, 1990–2000, 2010–2020

Bannock County is part of the Pocatello, Idaho Metropolitan Statistical Area.

=== Racial and ethnic composition ===
Bannock County, Idaho – Racial and ethnic composition Note: the US Census treats Hispanic/Latino as an ethnic category. This table excludes Latinos from the racial categories and assigns them to a separate category. Hispanics/Latinos may be of any race.
Race / Ethnicity (NH = Non-Hispanic)	Pop 1980	Pop 1990	Pop 2000	Pop 2010	Pop 2020	% 1980	% 1990	% 2000	% 2010	% 2020
White alone (NH)	60,658	60,626	67,636	71,566	70,447	92.72%	91.82%	89.51%	86.39%	80.96%
Black or African American alone (NH)	471	415	411	591	688	0.72%	0.63%	0.54%	0.71%	0.79%
Native American or Alaska Native alone (NH)	1,225	1,509	1,996	2,301	2,600	1.87%	2.29%	2.64%	2.78%	2.99%
Asian alone (NH)	557	697	732	1,060	1,148	0.85%	1.06%	0.97%	1.28%	1.32%
Native Hawaiian or Pacific Islander alone (NH)	x	x	121	170	249	x	x	0.16%	0.21%	0.29%
Other race alone (NH)	256	39	71	69	371	0.39%	0.06%	0.09%	0.08%	0.43%
Mixed race or Multiracial (NH)	x	x	1,058	1,495	3,522	x	x	1.40%	1.80%	4.05%
Hispanic or Latino (any race)	2,254	2,740	3,540	5,587	7,993	3.45%	4.15%	4.68%	6.74%	9.19%
Total	65,421	66,026	75,565	82,839	87,018	100.00%	100.00%	100.00%	100.00%	100.00%

=== 2020 census ===
As of the 2020 census, the county had a population of 87,018. The median age was 34.7 years. 26.0% of residents were under the age of 18 and 15.3% of residents were 65 years of age or older. For every 100 females there were 98.6 males, and for every 100 females age 18 and over there were 96.6 males age 18 and over.

The racial makeup of the county was 83.8% White, 0.9% Black or African American, 3.6% American Indian and Alaska Native, 1.4% Asian, 0.3% Native Hawaiian and Pacific Islander, 3.2% from some other race, and 6.9% from two or more races. Hispanic or Latino residents of any race comprised 9.2% of the population.

83.0% of residents lived in urban areas, while 17.0% lived in rural areas.

There were 32,438 households in the county, of which 33.0% had children under the age of 18 living with them and 24.4% had a female householder with no spouse or partner present. About 26.9% of all households were made up of individuals and 10.3% had someone living alone who was 65 years of age or older.

There were 34,903 housing units, of which 7.1% were vacant. Among occupied housing units, 67.6% were owner-occupied and 32.4% were renter-occupied. The homeowner vacancy rate was 1.4% and the rental vacancy rate was 7.8%.

=== 2010 census ===
As of the 2010 census, there were 82,839 people, 30,682 households, and 20,836 families in the county. The population density was 74.5 inhabitants per square mile (28.8/km^{2}). There were 33,191 housing units at an average density of 29.8 per square mile (11.5/km^{2}). The racial makeup of the county was 89.8% white, 3.2% American Indian, 1.3% Asian, 0.8% black or African American, 0.2% Pacific Islander, 2.1% from other races, and 2.7% from two or more races. Those of Hispanic or Latino origin made up 6.7% of the population. In terms of ancestry, 23.4% were English, 16.9% were German, 9.3% were Irish, and 7.0% were American.

Of the 30,682 households, 35.5% had children under the age of 18 living with them, 52.2% were married couples living together, 10.7% had a female householder with no husband present, 32.1% were non-families, and 24.9% of all households were made up of individuals. The average household size was 2.64 and the average family size was 3.17. The median age was 31.4 years.

The median income for a household in the county was $44,848 and the median income for a family was $54,650. Males had a median income of $43,538 versus $28,870 for females. The per capita income for the county was $21,275. About 10.6% of families and 14.0% of the population were below the poverty line, including 16.6% of those under age 18 and 4.2% of those aged 65 or over.

=== 2000 census ===
As of the 2000 census, there were 75,565 people, 27,192 households, and 19,224 families in the county. The population density was 68 inhabitants per square mile (26/km^{2}). There were 29,102 housing units at an average density of 26 per square mile (10/km^{2}). The racial makeup of the county was 91.29% White, 0.59% Black or African American, 2.91% Native American, 0.99% Asian, 0.16% Pacific Islander, 2.08% from other races, and 1.98% from two or more races. 4.68% of the population were Hispanic or Latino of any race. 23.1% were of English, 14.2% German, 11.1% American, and 7.4% Irish ancestry.

There were 27,192 households, out of which 36.50% had children under the age of 18 living with them, 56.70% were married couples living together, 10.00% had a female householder with no husband present, and 29.30% were non-families. 22.80% of all households were made up of individuals, and 7.60% had someone living alone who was 65 years of age or older. The average household size was 2.69 and the average family size was 3.20.

The county population contained 28.10% under the age of 18, 14.60% from 18 to 24, 27.20% from 25 to 44, 20.00% from 45 to 64, and 10.10% who were 65 years of age or older. The median age was 30 years. For every 100 females, there were 97.70 males. For every 100 females aged 18 and over, there were 94.40 males.

The median income for a household in the county was $36,683, and the median income for a family was $44,192. Males had a median income of $36,056 versus $23,595 for females. The per capita income for the county was $17,148. About 9.80% of families and 13.90% of the population were below the poverty line, including 15.60% of those under age 18 and 7.60% of those aged 65 or over.

== Government and politics ==
The last Democratic candidate for President to win the county was Lyndon B. Johnson in 1964. Subsequent Republican victories have been by smaller margins than those in the rest of Eastern Idaho, due to the presence of Idaho State University.

United States presidential election results for Bannock County, Idaho
Year	Republican		Democratic		Third party(ies)	
Year	No.	%	No.	%	No.	%
1896	228	14.27%	1,363	85.29%	7	0.44%
1900	1,684	51.58%	1,581	48.42%	0	0.00%
1904	2,826	68.58%	1,063	25.79%	232	5.63%
1908	2,690	56.75%	1,892	39.92%	158	3.33%
1912	2,316	48.04%	1,486	30.82%	1,019	21.14%
1916	2,950	40.10%	4,084	55.52%	322	4.38%
1920	4,871	62.00%	2,986	38.00%	0	0.00%
1924	4,520	44.99%	1,612	16.05%	3,914	38.96%
1928	5,297	53.22%	4,602	46.24%	54	0.54%
1932	4,676	35.81%	8,271	63.34%	112	0.86%
1936	3,830	28.60%	9,443	70.51%	120	0.90%
1940	5,419	34.05%	10,493	65.94%	1	0.01%
1944	5,413	35.84%	9,681	64.09%	11	0.07%
1948	5,580	35.86%	9,679	62.20%	301	1.93%
1952	10,864	55.25%	8,771	44.61%	27	0.14%
1956	10,476	53.51%	9,101	46.49%	0	0.00%
1960	9,157	42.11%	12,586	57.89%	0	0.00%
1964	7,825	36.72%	13,483	63.28%	0	0.00%
1968	10,234	47.97%	9,084	42.58%	2,016	9.45%
1972	12,856	57.93%	7,840	35.33%	1,495	6.74%
1976	13,172	53.65%	10,261	41.80%	1,117	4.55%
1980	18,477	61.88%	8,639	28.93%	2,743	9.19%
1984	18,742	65.77%	9,399	32.98%	355	1.25%
1988	14,986	52.40%	13,074	45.71%	541	1.89%
1992	12,016	37.30%	11,091	34.43%	9,104	28.26%
1996	14,058	44.80%	12,806	40.81%	4,513	14.38%
2000	18,223	59.07%	10,892	35.30%	1,737	5.63%
2004	21,479	61.64%	12,903	37.03%	462	1.33%
2008	19,356	54.62%	14,792	41.74%	1,289	3.64%
2012	21,010	59.14%	13,214	37.20%	1,299	3.66%
2016	17,180	51.41%	10,342	30.95%	5,894	17.64%
2020	23,331	58.65%	14,682	36.91%	1,770	4.45%
2024	24,329	60.48%	14,306	35.56%	1,591	3.96%

Similar to other Idaho counties, an elected three-member county commission heads the county government. Other elected officials include clerk, treasurer, sheriff, assessor, coroner, and prosecutor.

Like the rest of eastern Idaho, Bannock County has a significant Latter Day Saint population which tends to strongly vote Republican. However, a substantial trade union presence in the county - as well as the Idaho State University community - often gives Democrats an overall advantage, especially in local races. Bannock County routinely elects more Democrats than Republicans to county-level offices.

At the state level, Bannock County is located in Legislative Districts 28 and 29. Democrats currently control two of these six seats in the Idaho Legislature. In 2016, Republicans were able to win House Seat A in District 29.

Idaho Department of Correction operates the Pocatello Women's Correctional Center (PWCC) in Pocatello and in Bannock County.

== Communities ==
=== Cities ===
- Arimo
- Chubbuck
- Downey
- Inkom
- Lava Hot Springs
- McCammon
- Pocatello

=== Census-designated places ===
- Fort Hall (part)
- Tyhee

=== Unincorporated communities ===
- Blackrock
- Portneuf
- Robin
- Swanlake
- Virginia
- Zenda

== Education ==
School districts include:

- Grace Joint School District 148
- Marsh Valley Joint School District 21
- Pocatello/Chubbuck School District 25
- Preston Joint School District 201
- West Side Joint School District 202

There is also a Bureau of Indian Education (BIE)-affiliated school, Shoshone Bannock Jr./Sr. High School.

== See also ==
- List of counties in Idaho
- National Register of Historic Places listings in Bannock County, Idaho
