= Hamer, Idaho =

- City
- Location of Hamer in Jefferson County, Idaho.
- Coordinates: 43°55′27″N 112°12′14″W
- Country: United States
- State: Idaho
- County: Jefferson

Area
  - Total: 0.19 sq mi (0.49 km^{2})
  - Land: 0.19 sq mi (0.49 km^{2})
  - Water: 0 sq mi (0.00 km^{2})
- Elevation: 4,803 ft (1,464 m)

Population (2020)
  - Total: 83
  - Density: 544.3/sq mi (210.14/km^{2})
- Time zone: UTC-7 (Mountain (MST))
  - Summer (DST): UTC-6 (MDT)
- ZIP code: 83425
- Area code: 208
- FIPS code: 16-34570
- GNIS feature ID: 2410692

Hamer is an unincorporated area in Jefferson County, Idaho, United States. It is part of the Idaho Falls Metropolitan Statistical Area. The population was 83 at the 2020 census. Hamer was incorporated by Jefferson County in 1973; the city disincorporated after residents approved through an election in 2022.

The city was named after Thomas Ray Hamer (1864–1950), a United States Representative from Idaho.

== Geography ==
According to the United States Census Bureau, the city has a total area of 0.19 square miles (0.49 km^{2}), all of it land.

== Climate ==
According to the Köppen Climate Classification system, Hamer has a cold semi-arid climate, abbreviated "BSk" on climate maps. The hottest temperature recorded in Hamer was 105 °F (40.6 °C) on July 20, 1960, and August 12, 1990, while the coldest temperature recorded was −48 °F (−44.4 °C) on January 1, 1979.

Climate data for Hamer, Idaho, 1991–2020 normals, extremes 1948–present
Month	Jan	Feb	Mar	Apr	May	Jun	Jul	Aug	Sep	Oct	Nov	Dec	Year
Record high °F (°C)	55 (13)	58 (14)	74 (23)	86 (30)	93 (34)	102 (39)	105 (41)	105 (41)	99 (37)	88 (31)	70 (21)	60 (16)	105 (41)
Mean maximum °F (°C)	40.9 (4.9)	46.3 (7.9)	63.3 (17.4)	76.0 (24.4)	84.3 (29.1)	90.7 (32.6)	96.3 (35.7)	95.5 (35.3)	89.5 (31.9)	77.5 (25.3)	59.5 (15.3)	44.4 (6.9)	97.2 (36.2)
Mean daily maximum °F (°C)	29.2 (−1.6)	35.5 (1.9)	48.9 (9.4)	60.4 (15.8)	70.0 (21.1)	78.9 (26.1)	88.7 (31.5)	87.4 (30.8)	77.5 (25.3)	61.6 (16.4)	43.8 (6.6)	30.1 (−1.1)	59.3 (15.2)
Daily mean °F (°C)	18.1 (−7.7)	23.4 (−4.8)	35.3 (1.8)	44.7 (7.1)	53.6 (12.0)	61.4 (16.3)	68.9 (20.5)	67.3 (19.6)	58.2 (14.6)	45.0 (7.2)	30.5 (−0.8)	19.6 (−6.9)	43.8 (6.6)
Mean daily minimum °F (°C)	6.9 (−13.9)	11.3 (−11.5)	21.7 (−5.7)	28.9 (−1.7)	37.2 (2.9)	43.9 (6.6)	49.2 (9.6)	47.1 (8.4)	38.9 (3.8)	28.4 (−2.0)	17.3 (−8.2)	9.2 (−12.7)	28.3 (−2.0)
Mean minimum °F (°C)	−17.9 (−27.7)	−11.6 (−24.2)	3.3 (−15.9)	13.6 (−10.2)	22.8 (−5.1)	31.0 (−0.6)	38.5 (3.6)	35.8 (2.1)	25.2 (−3.8)	11.6 (−11.3)	−2.5 (−19.2)	−15.1 (−26.2)	−23.0 (−30.6)
Record low °F (°C)	−48 (−44)	−46 (−43)	−27 (−33)	1 (−17)	14 (−10)	25 (−4)	28 (−2)	20 (−7)	8 (−13)	−8 (−22)	−38 (−39)	−40 (−40)	−48 (−44)
Average precipitation inches (mm)	0.72 (18)	0.44 (11)	0.50 (13)	0.94 (24)	1.47 (37)	1.11 (28)	0.52 (13)	0.51 (13)	0.63 (16)	0.73 (19)	0.56 (14)	0.80 (20)	8.93 (226)
Average snowfall inches (cm)	5.8 (15)	3.5 (8.9)	1.7 (4.3)	0.8 (2.0)	0.0 (0.0)	0.0 (0.0)	0.0 (0.0)	0.0 (0.0)	0.0 (0.0)	0.1 (0.25)	1.7 (4.3)	6.8 (17)	20.4 (51.75)
Average precipitation days (≥ 0.01 in)	6.3	4.9	4.0	6.3	7.3	5.9	3.5	3.7	3.9	4.3	4.5	6.4	61.0
Average snowy days (≥ 0.1 in)	5.0	3.3	0.8	0.4	0.0	0.0	0.0	0.0	0.0	0.2	1.7	4.7	16.1
Source 1: NOAA
Source 2: National Weather Service

== Demographics ==
Historical population
Census	Pop.	Note	%±
1960	144		—
1970	81		−43.7%
1980	93		14.8%
1990	79		−15.1%
2000	12		−84.8%
2010	48		300.0%
2020	83		72.9%
2019 (est.)	104		116.7%
U.S. Decennial Census

=== 2010 census ===
As of the census of 2010, there were 48 people, 13 households, and 10 families living in the city. The population density was 252.6 inhabitants per square mile (97.5/km^{2}). There were 16 housing units at an average density of 84.2 per square mile (32.5/km^{2}). The racial makeup of the city was 72.9% White, 6.3% Asian, and 20.8% from two or more races. Hispanic or Latino of any race were 12.5% of the population.

There were 13 households, of which 46.2% had children under the age of 18 living with them, 69.2% were married couples living together, 7.7% had a female householder with no husband present, and 23.1% were non-families. 23.1% of all households were made up of individuals, and 15.4% had someone living alone who was 65 years of age or older. The average household size was 3.69, and the average family size was 4.50.

The median age in the city was 22 years. 47.9% of residents were under the age of 18; 2.2% were between the ages of 18 and 24; 14.7% were from 25 to 44; 18.8% were from 45 to 64; and 16.7% were 65 years of age or older. The gender makeup of the city was 47.9% male and 52.1% female.

=== 2000 census ===
As of the census of 2000, there were 12 people, 4 households, and 4 families living in the city. The population density was 59.7 inhabitants per square mile (23.1/km^{2}). There were 4 housing units at an average density of 19.9 per square mile (7.7/km^{2}). The racial makeup of the city was 41.67% White, 50.00% from other races, and 8.33% from two or more races. Hispanic or Latino of any race were 50.00% of the population.

There were 4 households, out of which 25.0% had children under the age of 18 living with them and 100.0% were married couples living together. The average household and family size was 3.00.

In the city, the population was spread out, with 16.7% under the age of 18, 25.0% from 18 to 24, 25.0% from 25 to 44, 8.3% from 45 to 64, and 25.0% who were 65 years of age or older. The median age was 28 years. For every 100 females, there were 200.0 males. For every 100 females age 18 and over, there were 150.0 males.

The median income for a household in the city was $24,167, and the median income for a family was $24,167. Males had a median income of $23,750 versus $11,250 for females. The per capita income for the city was $13,280. None of the population was below the poverty line.
