= Inkom, Idaho =

Inkom, Idaho Ingacom (Shoshone Indian name for Red Hare)
- City
- Logo

- Location of Inkom in Bannock County, Idaho.
- Coordinates: 42°47′48″N 112°14′45″W
- Country: United States
- State: Idaho
- County: Bannock

Area
  - Total: 0.99 sq mi (2.56 km^{2})
  - Land: 0.97 sq mi (2.52 km^{2})
  - Water: 0.015 sq mi (0.04 km^{2})
- Elevation: 4,541 ft (1,384 m)

Population (2020)
  - Total: 792
  - Density: 928.4/sq mi (358.45/km^{2})
- Time zone: UTC-7 (Mountain (MST))
  - Summer (DST): UTC-6 (MDT)
- ZIP code: 83245
- Area codes: 208, 986
- FIPS code: 16-40330
- GNIS feature ID: 2410108
- Website: inkomcity.org

Inkom is a city in Bannock County, Idaho. It is part of the Pocatello, Idaho Metropolitan Statistical Area. The population was 792 at the time of the 2020 census. It is the home of the smallest airport in the world, Simko Field Airport 1ID9, with a runway length of 122 meters (400 feet).

== History ==
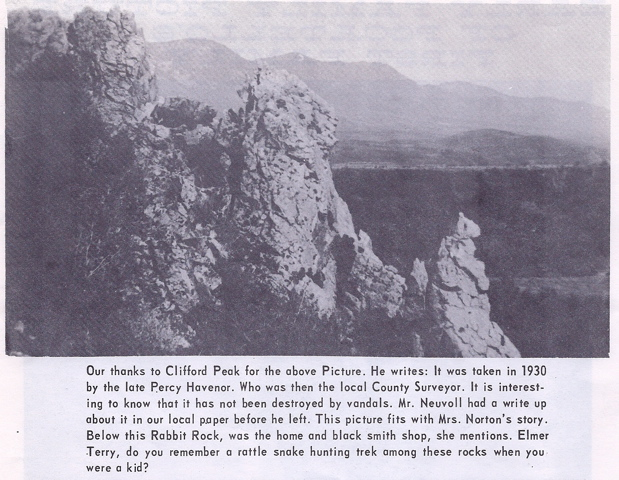
1930 photo of Ingacom (Red Rabbit)

The Shoshone Indians named the area around present day Inkom "Ingacom", a reference to the rock formation on the eastern side of town, where one can see the remnants of the "Red Hare". It was photographed in 1930 after the "ears" had been knocked off by vandals. The local creek was originally called "Rabbit River" but later changed to Rapid Creek as it is called today. The "Red Hare" is still there today.

== Geography ==
According to the United States Census Bureau, the city has a total area of 0.75 square miles (1.94 km^{2}), of which, 0.74 square miles (1.92 km^{2}) is land and 0.01 square miles (0.03 km^{2}) is water.

== Demographics ==
Historical population
Census	Pop.	Note	%±
1950	434		—
1960	528		21.7%
1970	522		−1.1%
1980	830		59.0%
1990	769		−7.3%
2000	738		−4.0%
2010	854		15.7%
2020	792		−7.3%
2023 (est.)	832		5.1%
U.S. Decennial Census

=== 2010 census ===
As of the census of 2010, there were 854 people, 288 households, and 222 families living in the city. The population density was 1,154.1 inhabitants per square mile (445.6/km^{2}). There were 305 housing units at an average density of 412.2 per square mile (159.2/km^{2}). The racial makeup of the city was 95.2% White, 0.6% African American, 0.2% Native American, 0.8% Asian, 1.3% from other races, and 1.9% from two or more races. Hispanic or Latino of any race were 4.4% of the population.

There were 288 households, of which 41.7% had children under the age of 18 living with them, 64.6% were married couples living together, 8.3% had a female householder with no husband present, 4.2% had a male householder with no wife present, and 22.9% were non-families. 18.1% of all households were made up of individuals, and 5.5% had someone living alone who was 65 years of age or older. The average household size was 2.97 and the average family size was 3.41.

The median age in the city was 32.4 years. 33% of residents were under the age of 18; 7.8% were between the ages of 18 and 24; 23.7% were from 25 to 44; 23.6% were from 45 to 64; and 11.8% were 65 years of age or older. The gender makeup of the city was 47.5% male and 52.5% female.

=== 2000 census ===
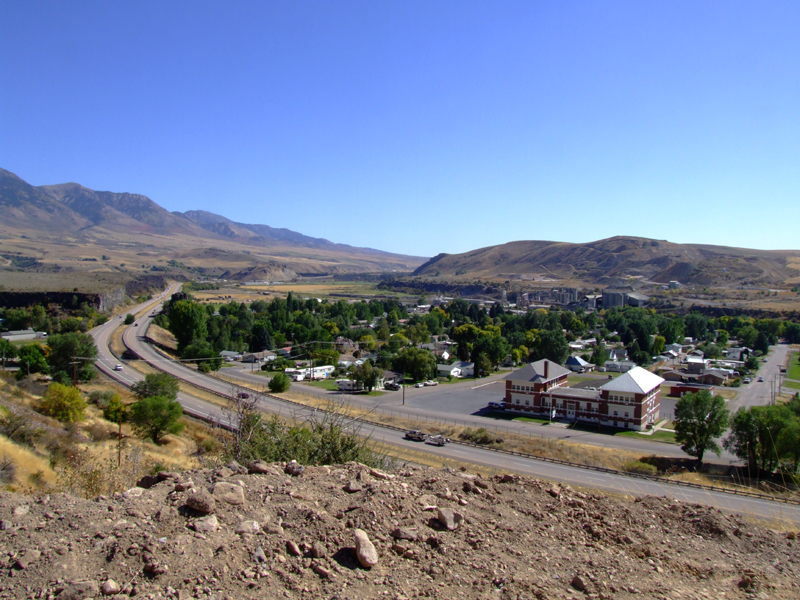
Inkom, September 2010

As of the census of 2000, there were 738 people, 253 households, and 201 families living in the city. The population density was 1,141.8 inhabitants per square mile (440.9/km^{2}). There were 263 housing units at an average density of 406.9 per square mile (157.1/km^{2}). The racial makeup of the city was 95.12% White, 0.27% African American, 1.36% Native American, 0.27% Asian, 1.22% from other races, and 1.76% from two or more races. Hispanic or Latino of any race were 2.71% of the population.

There were 253 households, out of which 43.1% had children under the age of 18 living with them, 64.0% were married couples living together, 12.3% had a female householder with no husband present, and 20.2% were non-families. 17.0% of all households were made up of individuals, and 6.7% had someone living alone who was 65 years of age or older. The average household size was 2.92 and the average family size was 3.31.

In the city, the population was spread out, with 32.4% under the age of 18, 8.9% from 18 to 24, 27.5% from 25 to 44, 22.1% from 45 to 64, and 9.1% who were 65 years of age or older. The median age was 32 years. For every 100 females, there were 98.9 males. For every 100 females age 18 and over, there were 92.7 males.

The median income for a household in the city was $32,500, and the median income for a family was $42,000. Males had a median income of $34,167 versus $22,656 for females. The per capita income for the city was $13,501. About 8.0% of families and 10.3% of the population were below the poverty line, including 12.7% of those under age 18 and 7.9% of those age 65 or over.

== See also ==
- List of cities in Idaho
