= Area codes 208 and 986 =

Telephone area codes of Idaho, United States

Coordinates: 45°N 114°W

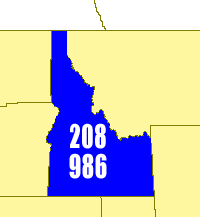
Area codes in Idaho

Area codes 208 and 986 are telephone area codes in the North American Numbering Plan (NANP) for all of Idaho. Area code 208 is one of the 86 original North American area codes designated by the American Telephone and Telegraph Company (AT&T) in 1947. It was Idaho's sole area code for seventy years. In 2017, 986 was added to the same numbering plan area in creating an overlay complex.

== History ==
Because of its small population, Idaho was among a declining number of North American jurisdictions with only one area code. It is also one of the few whole-state area codes split between multiple LATAs—Southern Idaho (centered in Boise and spilling into Nevada, Wyoming and Malheur County, Oregon) and Coeur d'Alene (spilling into Montana and Washington). Additionally, the Spokane, Washington LATA spills into central Idaho.

In 2001, the North American Numbering Plan Administrator (NANPA) projected that demand would exhaust the numbering pool of area code 208 in 2003. The number shortage was a result of the proliferation of landlines, cellphones, and pagers, particularly in urban areas, in the 1990s. However, in 2002 the Idaho Public Utilities Commission (IPUC) successfully delayed a split by implementing number pooling in Boise; this was later applied in 2007 to the rest of Idaho to stave off projected exhaustion in 2010.

In the summer of 2013, NANPA projections suggested exhaustion in 2018. By this time all conservation measures had been exhausted. With Idaho's population growing closer to two million, a second area code became necessary; eleven other states with single area codes all have populations of about one million each. Ultimately, a statewide overlay was recommended. This would have had the effect of assigning 15.6 million numbers to a state of just over 1.7 million people. However, the Idaho PUC wanted to spare Idahoans, particularly in rural areas, the expense and burden of having to change their numbers. An area code split would have also required reprogramming of all cell phones. In the overlay plan, subscribers keep their original area code.

On November 2, 2015, the Idaho PUC approved the addition of area code 986 as a statewide overlay. 986 officially entered service on November 5, 2016. On that date, a permissive dialing period began during which it was possible to make calls with either seven or ten digits. Ten-digit dialing became mandatory across Idaho on August 5, 2017. 986 is the second statewide overlay, following the example of area codes 304 and 681 in West Virginia in 2009.

== Service area and central office codes ==
| Cities | Area code 208 prefixes | Area code 986 prefixes |
|---|---|---|
| Aberdeen | 328, 397 | 242 |
| Albion | 638, 654, 673 | 588, 899 |
| American Falls | 220, 226, 269, 548 | 245 |
| Arbon | 335 | 842 |
| Arco | 527, 767 | 732 |
| Arimo | 705, 708, 760, 904 | |
| Ashton | 652 | 926 |
| Bancroft | 648, 776 | |
| Bayview | 216, 222, 561, 683 | 300 |
| Bellevue | 578, 788 | |
| Bern | 847, 945 | 382 |
| Blackfoot | 346, 604, 643, 680, 681, 684, 690, 782, 785, 980 | 233 |
| Blanchard | 213, 437 | 258 |
| Bliss | 352 | |
| Boise | 202, 207, 246, 258, 272, 275, 283, 284, 296, 302, 314, 319, 321, 322, 323, 327, 331, 332, 333, 334, 336, 338, 340, 341, 342, 343, 344, 345, 348, 350, 353, 362, 363, 364, 367, 368, 370, 371, 373, 375, 376, 377, 378, 381, 383, 384, 385, 386, 387, 388, 389, 391, 393, 395, 396, 407, 409, 422, 424, 426, 429, 433, 440, 447, 472, 473, 474, 475, 484, 488, 489, 492, 493, 501, 505, 506, 509, 513, 514, 515, 519, 559, 562, 563, 565, 570, 571, 573, 576, 577, 579, 593, 600, 602, 605, 608, 609, 616, 617, 629, 639, 658, 672, 685, 703, 713, 724, 761, 780, 789, 794, 801, 803, 805, 807, 809, 810, 813, 830, 841, 850, 853, 854, 859, 860, 861, 863, 866, 867, 869, 872, 890, 891, 900, 901, 906, 908, 912, 914, 917, 918, 919, 921, 938, 939, 941, 947, 949, 954, 957, 963, 968, 971, 972, 982, 985, 986, 991, 992, 994, 995, 996, 999 | 200, 210, 213, 217, 224, 226, 229, 230, 236, 256, 268, 269, 270, 273, 279, 280, 283, 287, 292, 666, 793, 837, 867, 888, 895, 910, 986, 999 |
| Bonners Ferry | 295 | 253, 348 |
| Bruneau | 759, 828, 832, 845 | 223 |
| Buhl | 490, 543 | |
| Burley | 219, 261, 312, 430, 572, 647, 650, 654, 670, 677, 678, 808, 831 | 313 |
| Caldwell | 402, 453, 454, 455, 459, 504, 614, 649, 779, 795 | 201, 204, 276, 286 |
| Cambridge | 257 | 250 |
| Carey | 823 | 642 |
| Careywood | 222 | |
| Carmen | 394 | 526 |
| Cascade | 382, 408 | 400, 640 |
| Castleford | 537 | |
| Challis | 879 | 455 |
| Clark Fork | 222, 266 | 671 |
| Clayton | 838 | 982 |
| Clifton | 747 | |
| Coeur d'Alene | 208, 209, 210, 215, 277, 292, 415, 416, 444, 446, 449, 470, 500, 508, 551, 601, 618, 619, 620, 625, 640, 641, 651, 659, 660, 661, 664, 665, 666, 667, 676, 691, 699, 704, 714, 719, 755, 758, 763, 765, 769, 770, 771, 797, 819, 889, 905, 916, 929, 930, 956, 964, 966, 967, 981 | 215, 240, 244, 248, 257, 271, 281, 668, 810, 860, 896 |
| Coolin | 443 | 254 |
| Corral | 653, 764 | 336 |
| Cottonwood | 502, 517, 962 | |
| Council | 253 | 422 |
| Craigmont | 924, 925 | 566 |
| Culdesac | 836 | |
| Dayton | 747 | |
| Deary | 826, 877 | 500, 758 |
| Declo | 349, 638 | |
| Desmet | 268, 274, 668, 951 | 203, 214, 265 |
| Dietrich | 544, 886 | |
| Donnelly | 325, 382, 630, 634 | 227, 686 |
| Downey | 897 | |
| Driggs | 354, 399, 491 | |
| Dubois | 374, 560 | |
| Eden | 825, 829 | |
| Elk City | 842 | |
| Ellis | 894 | 755 |
| Emmett | 365, 369, 398, 477, 817 | 212, 278, 777 |
| Fairfield | 764 | 336 |
| Felt | 456 | |
| Ferdinand | 925 | |
| Filer | 316, 326, 595, 613, 208-751, 933, 944, 948 | 220 |
| Firth | 346 | |
| Franklin | 646 | |
| Fruitland | 294, 452, 510, 566, 674, 707, 729 | 237, 272 |
| Garden City | 321, 322, 323, 327, 373, 375, 376, 377, 378, 658, 672, 685, 853, 854 | |
| Garden Valley | 462, 923 | |
| Genesee | 224, 285, 581 | |
| Geneva | 225 | |
| Gibbonsville | 394 | 526 |
| Glenns Ferry | 366 | |
| Gooding | 934, 961, 969 | |
| Grace | 425, 427, 530, 540, 547 | |
| Grand View | 834, 990 | |
| Grangeville | 451, 494, 507, 983 | 689 |
| Greencreek | 502, 517, 962 | |
| Hagerman | 837 | |
| Hailey | 205, 309, 450, 471, 481, 578, 622, 720, 721, 725, 726, 727, 788, 806 | |
| Hamer | 662 | 388 |
| Harrison | 231, 689, 902, 987 | 255 |
| Hayden | 518, 762, 772 | |
| Heyburn | 438, 654, 679 | |
| Holbrook | 698 | 546 |
| Homedale | 337, 974 | |
| Hope | 264, 266 | 946 |
| Horseshoe Bend | 781, 793 | 218 |
| Idaho City | 392 | |
| Idaho Falls | 200, 201, 206, 227, 243, 313, 403, 419, 497, 516, 520, 521, 522, 523, 524, 525, 526, 528, 529, 533, 534, 535, 541, 542, 552, 557, 569, 607, 701, 709, 710, 715, 757, 818, 821, 881, 932, 970, 973 | 208, 219, 231, 249, 275, 497, 800 |
| Indian Valley | 253, 256 | 746 |
| Inkom | 705, 708, 760, 775, 904 | |
| Irwin | 270, 483, 499 | 465 |
| Island Park | 558 | 426 |
| Jerome | 316, 320, 324, 329, 595, 644, 751, 933, 944, 948 | |
| Juliaetta | 276, 289 | |
| Kamiah | 702, 820, 935 | 261 |
| Kellogg | 512, 783, 784, 786 | |
| Kendrick | 289 | 289 |
| Ketchum | 309, 450, 471, 481, 622, 720, 721, 725, 726, 727, 806, 913 | 209 |
| Kimberly | 420, 421, 423 | |
| Kooskia | 802, 926 | 636 |
| Kuna | 922 | |
| Lapwai | 224, 621, 804, 836, 843, 927 | |
| Lava Hot Springs | 776 | |
| Leadore | 768 | 246 |
| Lewiston | 224, 298, 299, 305, 413, 503, 553, 717, 743, 746, 748, 750, 790, 791, 792, 798, 799, 816, 848, 984 | 252 |
| Lowman | 259, 864 | 247, 482 |
| Mackay | 588 | 782 |
| Malad City | 766, 815 | |
| Malta | 638, 645, 671, 824 | 243, 899 |
| Marsing | 896 | 225 |
| May | 876 | 334 |
| McCall | 315, 469, 630, 632, 634, 849 | |
| McCammon | 254, 705, 708, 760, 776, 904 | |
| Medimont | 689, 902 | |
| Melba | 204, 495, 856 | 207 |
| Meridian | 288, 401, 412, 631, 695, 706, 822, 846, 855, 870, 871, 884, 887, 888, 893, 895, 898, 955 | |
| Mesa | 253 | |
| Middleton | 585 | |
| Midvale | 355, 592 | |
| Monteview | 657 | 542 |
| Montpelier | 847, 945 | 382 |
| Moore | 554 | |
| Moscow | 301, 310, 596, 669, 874, 882, 883, 885, 892, 997 | 251, 600 |
| Mountain Home | 580, 587, 590, 591, 598, 599, 696, 796, 828, 832, 868, 943 | 232, 466 |
| Mountain Home AFB | 796, 828, 832 | |
| Moyie Springs | 267 | |
| Mullan | 744 | 259 |
| Murphy | 583 | 874 |
| Murtaugh | 218, 432 | |
| Nampa | 249, 250, 318, 442, 461, 463, 465, 466, 467, 468, 498, 546, 586, 606, 615, 697, 800, 880, 899, 910, 936, 960, 965, 989 | 206, 216, 266, 274, 282, |
| Naples | 267 | |
| New Meadows | 347, 630, 634 | 886 |
| New Plymouth | 278, 566, 674, 707, 953 | 267, 272 |
| Nezperce | 937 | 264 |
| Nordman | 443 | 254 |
| North Fork | 394 | 526 |
| Oakley | 862 | 646, 922 |
| Oldtown | 213, 437 | 258 |
| Orofino | 400, 476, 827 | 866 |
| Parma | 203, 566, 674, 707, 722 | 272, 786, 980 |
| Paul | 438, 532, 679 | 346, 366 |
| Payette | 230, 291, 405, 642, 739, 740, 741, 812 | 239, 942 |
| Peak | 486 | 263 |
| Pierce | 464, 942 | 234, 900 |
| Pinehurst | 682 | |
| Pingree | 328 | |
| Placerville | 392 | 218 |
| Plummer | 231, 273, 274, 686, 987 | 203, 214, 241, 255 |
| Pocatello | 221, 223, 232, 233, 234, 235, 236, 237, 238, 239, 240, 241, 242, 244, 251, 252, 281, 282, 317, 339, 380, 406, 417, 478, 589, 637, 775, 833, 909, 915 | |
| Post Falls | 262, 457, 773, 777 | |
| Potlatch | 268, 668, 858, 875, 951 | 265, 333 |
| Preston | 646, 840, 851, 852 | |
| Priest River | 213, 428, 437, 448 | 238, 258 |
| Princeton | 858 | |
| Rathdrum | 687, 712 | |
| Reubens | 836, 925 | |
| Rexburg | 351, 356, 359, 360, 390, 496, 656, 716 | |
| Richfield | 487 | 529 |
| Rigby | 745, 754 | 222, 277 |
| Riggins | 628 | 766 |
| Ririe | 538 | |
| Roberts | 228 | |
| Rockland | 335, 548 | 245, 842 |
| Rogerson | 655, 857 | 342 |
| Rupert | 260, 300, 431, 434, 436, 438, 531, 532, 679, 878, 931 | 366, 742 |
| St. Anthony | 372, 612, 624 | 582 |
| St. Charles | 945 | 382 |
| St. Maries | 245, 568, 582 | 241, 262 |
| Salmon | 303, 742, 756, 865, 940, 993 | |
| Sandpoint | 217, 255, 263, 265, 290, 304, 597, 610, 627, 920, 946 | 205 |
| Shelley | 346, 357 | |
| Shoshone | 544, 886 | |
| Soda Springs | 530, 540, 547 | |
| Spencer | 374, 560, 778 | 326 |
| Spirit Lake | 623 | 345 |
| Stanley | 594, 774 | |
| Star | 286 | |
| Sugar City | 372, 612 | 582 |
| Swan Valley | 270, 483 | |
| Sweet | 584 | 218, 444 |
| Tensed | 268, 273, 951 | 203, 214 |
| Terreton | 663 | |
| Teton | 372, 458, 612 | 582 |
| Tetonia | 456 | |
| Thatcher | 425, 427 | |
| Troy | 289, 835 | |
| Twin Falls | 212, 280, 293, 308, 316, 358, 404, 410, 539, 595, 655, 731, 732, 733, 734, 735, 736, 737, 738, 749, 751, 814, 933, 944, 948 | |
| Victor | 787 | |
| Viola | 668, 858 | 265 |
| Wallace | 556, 752, 753 | |
| Wayan | 564, 574, 675, 688, 873, 998 | 677 |
| Weippe | 435 | 260 |
| Weiser | 414, 549, 550, 718, 907 | 221 |
| Wendell | 536 | |
| Weston | 646, 747 | |
| White Bird | 839 | |
| Wilder | 482 | 386 |
| Worley | 231, 273, 902, 987 | 241, 255 |
| Yellow Pine | 633, 636 | 641 |

== See also ==
- List of North American Numbering Plan area codes

Idaho area codes: 208/986
| | North: 250/236/672/778, 406 | |
| West: 458/541, 509 | 208/986 | East: 307, 406 |
| | South: 435, 775 | |
Montana area codes: 406
Wyoming area codes: 307
Utah area codes: 385/801, 435
Nevada area codes: 702/725, 775
Oregon area codes: 503/971, 541/458
Washington area codes: 206, 253, 360, 425, 509, 564
British Columbia area codes: 250, 604, 236/257/672/778
