= Spencer, Idaho =

- City
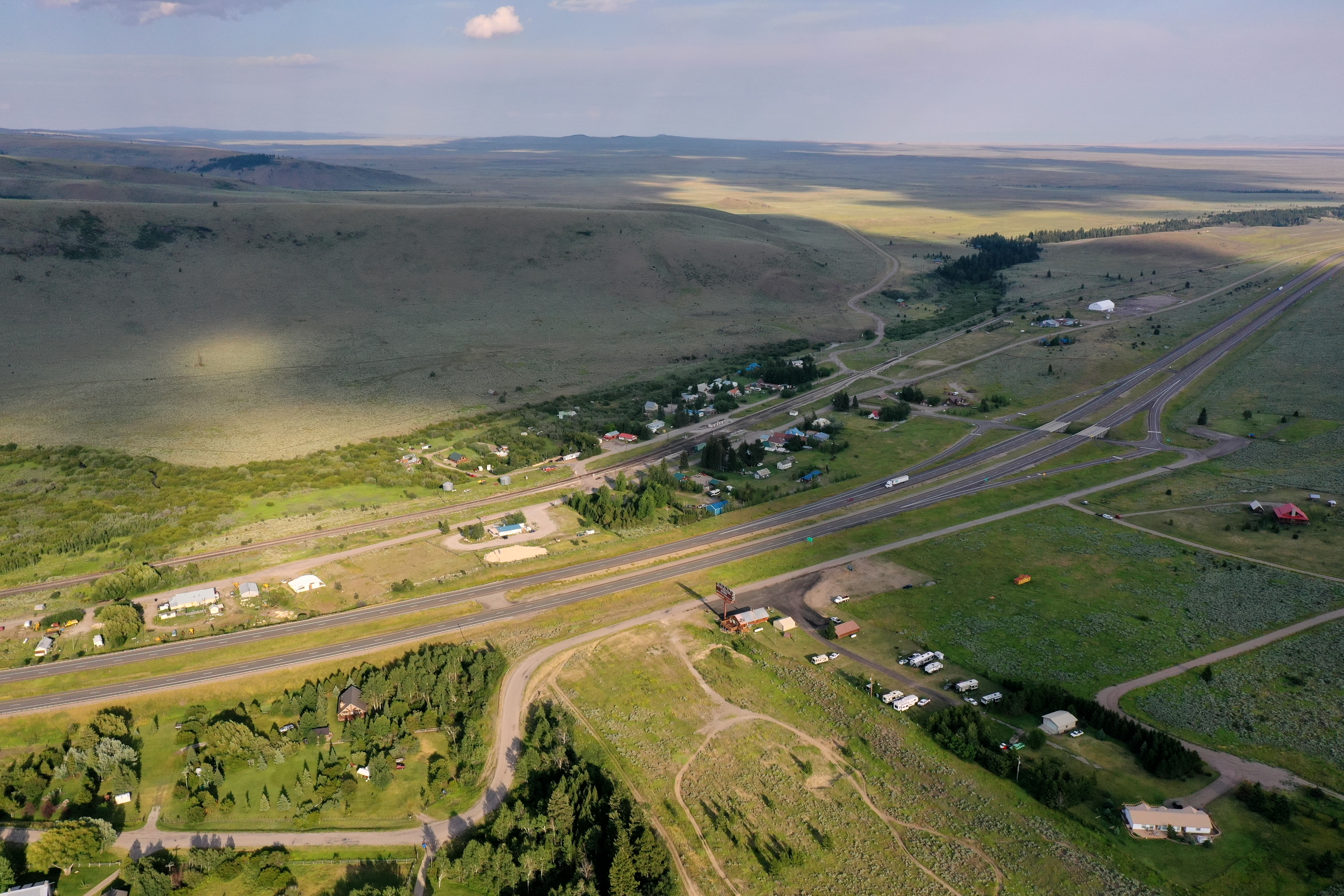

- Location of Spencer in Clark County, Idaho.
- Coordinates: 44°22′42″N 112°11′28″W
- Country: United States
- State: Idaho
- County: Clark

Area
  - Total: 1.14 sq mi (2.96 km^{2})
  - Land: 1.14 sq mi (2.96 km^{2})
  - Water: 0 sq mi (0.00 km^{2})
- Elevation: 5,978 ft (1,822 m)

Population (2020)
  - Total: 31
  - Density: 27/sq mi (10/km^{2})
- Time zone: UTC-7 (Mountain (MST))
  - Summer (DST): UTC-6 (MDT)
- ZIP code: 83446
- Area code: 208
- FIPS code: 16-75970
- GNIS feature ID: 2411951

Spencer is an incorporated hamlet in Clark County, Idaho, United States. It serves as the base for the state's opal mine and is called the "Opal Capital of America": the mine proper is located 5–6 miles outside of town. The population was 31 at the 2020 census.

== Geography ==
According to the United States Census Bureau, the city has a total area of 1.12 square miles (2.90 km^{2}), all of it land.

== Demographics ==
Historical population
Census	Pop.	Note	%±
1950	70		—
1960	100		42.9%
1970	45		−55.0%
1980	29		−35.6%
1990	11		−62.1%
2000	38		245.5%
2010	37		−2.6%
2020	31		−16.2%
U.S. Decennial Census

=== 2010 census ===
As of the census of 2010, there were 37 people, 18 households, and 11 families residing in the city. The population density was 33.0 inhabitants per square mile (12.7/km^{2}). There were 50 housing units at an average density of 44.6 units per square mile (17.2 units/km^{2}). The racial makeup of the city was 100.0% White.

There were 18 households, of which 22.2% had children under the age of 18 living with them, 55.6% were married couples living together, 5.6% had a male householder with no wife present, and 38.9% were non-families. 38.9% of all households were made up of individuals, and 16.7% had someone living alone who was 65 years of age or older. The average household size was 2.06 and the average family size was 2.73.

The median age in the city was 54.3 years. 21.6% of residents were under the age of 18; 0% were between the ages of 18 and 24; 8.1% were from 25 to 44; 40.5% were from 45 to 64; and 29.7% were 65 years of age or older. The gender makeup of the city was 62.2% male and 37.8% female.

=== 2000 census ===
As of the census of 2000, there were 38 people, 17 households, and 12 families residing in the city. The population density was 33.6 inhabitants per square mile (13.0/km^{2}). There were 38 housing units at an average density of 33.6 units per square mile (13.0 units/km^{2}). The racial makeup of the city was 94.74% White, 2.63% Native American, 2.63% from other races. Hispanic or Latino of any race were 7.89% of the population.

There were 17 households, out of which 11.8% had children under the age of 18 living with them, 70.6% were married couples living together, and 29.4% were non-families. 17.6% of all households were made up of individuals, and 5.9% had someone living alone who was 65 years of age or older. The average household size was 2.24 and the average family size was 2.50.

In the city, the population was spread out, with 15.8% under the age of 18, 23.7% from 25 to 44, 39.5% from 45 to 64, and 21.1% who were 65 years of age or older. The median age was 55 years. For every 100 females, there were 100.0 males. For every 100 females age 18 and over, there were 113.3 males.

The median income for a household in the city was $21,875, and the median income for a family was $21,250. Males had a median income of $11,250 versus $6,250 for females. The per capita income for the city was $11,711. There were 40.0% of families and 56.8% of the population living below the poverty line, including 100.0% of under eighteens and none of those over 64.
