= National Register of Historic Places listings in Power County, Idaho =

Location of Power County in Idaho

This is a list of the National Register of Historic Places listings in Power County, Idaho.

This is intended to be a complete list of the properties and districts on the National Register of Historic Places in Power County, Idaho, United States. Latitude and longitude coordinates are provided for many National Register properties and districts; these locations may be seen together in a map.

There are 12 properties and districts listed on the National Register in the county. More may be added; properties and districts nationwide are added to the Register weekly.

This National Park Service list is complete through NPS recent listings posted May 23, 2025.

== Current listings ==
	Name on the Register	Image	Date listed	Location	City or town	Description
1	American Falls Archeological District	American Falls Archeological District	July 1, 1999 (#99000804)	Address Restricted	American Falls	
2	American Falls East Shore Power Plants	American Falls East Shore Power Plants	October 29, 1976 (#76000680)	State Highway 39; 42°46′34″N 112°52′27″W	American Falls	
3	American Falls Reservoir Flooded Townsite		January 28, 2002 (#01001480)	American Falls Reservoir; 42°47′31″N 112°51′55″W	American Falls	
4	Bethany Deaconess Hospital	Bethany Deaconess Hospital	April 27, 1995 (#95000507)	500 Pocatello Highway Avenue; 42°47′03″N 112°50′56″W	American Falls	
5	William Davie House	William Davie House	April 2, 2008 (#08000252)	703 Hutchinson Avenue; 42°46′53″N 112°51′18″W	American Falls	
6	Oneida Milling and Elevator Company Grain Elevator	Oneida Milling and Elevator Company Grain Elevator	July 16, 1993 (#93000380)	Offshore in American Falls Reservoir; 42°47′05″N 112°52′04″W	American Falls	
7	Oregon Trail Historic District		March 20, 1973 (#73000688)	Southwest of American Falls along Interstate 86 / U.S. Route 30, and "West of American Falls"; 42°39′16″N 113°02′38″W	American Falls	
8	Power County Courthouse	Power County Courthouse	September 22, 1987 (#87001601)	543 Bannock Avenue; 42°46′59″N 112°50′55″W	American Falls	
9	Register Rock	Register Rock	July 24, 1978 (#78001097)	West of American Falls on former routing of U.S. Route 30; 42°39′10″N 113°00′58″W	Massacre Rocks State Park	
10	St. John's Episcopal Church	St. John's Episcopal Church	February 7, 2007 (#07000004)	328 Roosevelt Street; 42°46′56″N 112°51′04″W	American Falls	
11	Walter Sparks House	Walter Sparks House	February 7, 2007 (#07000002)	408 Roosevelt Street; 42°46′55″N 112°50′58″W	American Falls	
12	Richard and Winnie Warwas House	Richard and Winnie Warwas House	August 31, 2006 (#06000741)	275 Polk St. 42°46′53″N 112°51′11″W	American Falls	

== See also ==
- List of National Historic Landmarks in Idaho
- National Register of Historic Places listings in Idaho
