= Oregon Trail Historic District (Power County, Idaho) =

Historic district in Power County, Idaho, United States

- U.S. National Register of Historic Places
- Location within Idaho Location within the United States
- Location: Southest of American Falls
- Nearest city: American Falls, Idaho; United States
- Coordinates: 42°39′15″N 113°2′38″W
- Area: More than 14 acres (5.7 ha)
- NRHP reference No.: 73000688
- Added to NRHP: March 30, 1973

Oregon Trail Historic District is a historic district along the Oregon and the original California trails in Power County, Idaho, United States, that is listed on the National Register of Historic Places (NFHP).

== Description ==
The "historic district includes two segments of unaltered (except for natural erosion) Oregon Trail" south of the Snake River in the general area of Register Rock.

The eastern segment is located about midway between Register Rock and the unincorporated community of Neeley, extends along a ravine for roughly one-half mile (0.80 km) on the south side of Interstate 86/U.S. Route 30 (I-86 / US 30), and is partially within the Massacre Rocks State Park. This segment includes a section where "the trail winds down into a ravine where emigrant wagons had difficulty in crossing".

The western segment is an area of about 13.26 acres (5.37 ha) south of Tule Island and I-86 / US 30 (just east of the Coldwater Hill Eastbound Rest Area). This segment includes an "ascending a grade out of Snake river [sic] shoreland west of Bonanza Bar, includes a small ridge covered with tracks where wagons encountered difficulty getting up a hill."

The district was added to the NRHP March 30, 1973.

== See also ==
- National Register of Historic Places listings in Power County, Idaho
