= Idaho State Highway 38 =

State highway in Oneida County, Idaho, United States

State Highway 38
- SH-38 highlighted in red

Route information
- Maintained by ITD
- Length: 23.438 mi (37.720 km)

Major junctions
- West end: Rockland Highway near Holbrook
- East end: I-15 near Malad City

Location
- Country: United States
- State: Idaho
- Counties: Oneida

Highway system
- Idaho State Highway System; Interstate; US; State
← SH-37	→ SH-39

State Highway 38 (SH‑38) is a 23.438-mile (37.720 km) east–west state highway in Oneida County, Idaho, United States, that connects 2100 West and Old Highway 37 (northwest of Holbrook) with Interstate 15 (I‑15), just east of Malad City.

== Route description ==
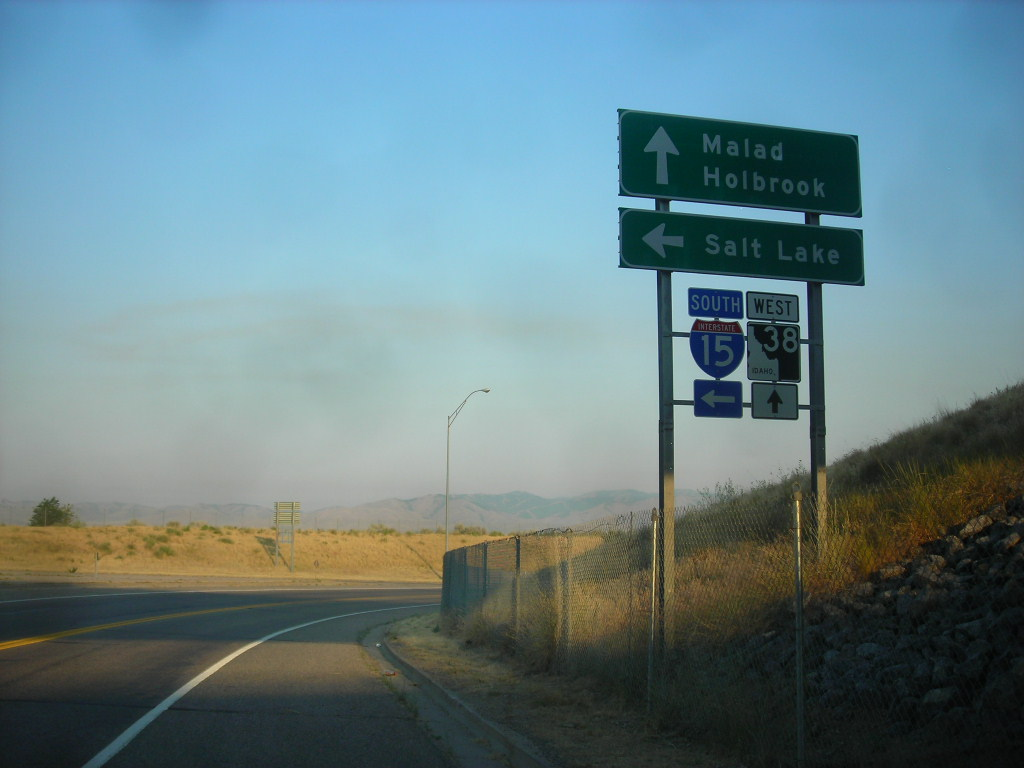
Sign near the eastern terminus of SH-38, on the west side of Interstate 15, July 2007

SH‑38 begins at an intersection with Old Highway 37 (also known as Rockland Highway and North Holbrook Road) and 2100 West (also known as Stone Highway) northwest of Holbrook. From the western terminus of SH‑38 the Old Highway 37, former routing of SH-37, continues northwest to the Power County line and the southern terminus of SH‑37. From its western terminus, SH‑38 heads east through a rural area between sections of the Curlew National Grassland. It takes a more crooked route east of Holbrook, intersecting Arbon Valley Road. From there, the SH‑38 enters mountainous terrain, passing Holbrook Summit at an elevation of 6,104 feet (1,860 m). After passing through the mountains, SH‑38 enters a rural area and passes through the unincorporated community of Pleasantview. SH‑38 then turns northeast toward Malad City, passing south of the Malad City Airport. After entering Malad City, the route turns eastward, passing through a mixed residential and business district. SH‑38 leaves the Malad City limits before reaching its eastern terminus with I‑15 at a diamond interchange. From the interchange, Old Highway 191 (formerly U.S. Route 191) continues north toward Downey.

== History ==
Between 1927 and 1937, the SH‑38 designation was assigned to the former SH-32 that began in Roy and headed east and then northeast to Arbon, north to Pauline along modern-day Arbon Highway and then north on the modern-day Bannock Highway to Crystal, and on to terminate in at the former routing of US-91 in Portneuf.

The route which is now SH‑38 was designated as part of former routing of SH-33 by 1927. Between 1927 and 1937, SH‑33 was changed to SH‑37; the north-south route through Malad City had also been designated as SH-21, but by 1937 it had been changed to SH-36. By 1956, the southern terminus of SH‑38 had changed from SH‑37 in Roy to SH‑37 east of Holbrook via Buist to Arbon. Eventually, the routing of SH‑38 was changed to its current route, with the roads through Buist, Arbon, and Crystal to Portneuf being entirely removed from the state highway system.

== Major intersections ==
The entire route is in Oneida County.

Location	mi	km	Destinations	Notes
	23.438	37.720	Old Highway 37 (Rockland Highway) / 21000 West	Western terminus
Malad City	0.742	1.194	East 90 South / South Main Street (Old Highway 191)	Former US-191
	0.273– 0.000	0.439– 0.000	I-15 – Salt Lake, Downey, Pocatello	Eastern terminus; interchange; road continues as Old Highway 191
1.000 mi = 1.609 km; 1.000 km = 0.621 mi
