= Idaho State Highway 37 =

State highway in Power County, Idaho, United States

State Highway 37
- Rockland Highway
- SH-37 highlighted in red

Route information
- Maintained by ITD
- Length: 31.231 mi (50.261 km)

Major junctions
- South end: Rockland Highway near Roy
- North end: I-86 / I-86 BL near American Falls

Location
- Country: United States
- State: Idaho
- Counties: Power

Highway system
- Idaho State Highway System; Interstate; US; State
← SH-36	→ SH-38

State Highway 37 (Rockland Highway/SH-37) is a 31.231-mile (50.261 km) north–south state highway in Power County, Idaho, United States, that connects Rockland Highway (south of Roy) with Interstate 86/U.S. Route 30 in Idaho (I-86/US 30), southwest of American Falls.

== Route description ==
SH-37 begins south of Roy at the Oneida County line on the Rockland Highway, which continues south to Holbrook and the western terminus of Idaho State Highway 38. From its southern terminus, SH-37 heads northwest briefly before turning north to pass through Roy. It then continues north through farmland and passes through the town of Rockland before ending at a diamond interchange with I-86/US 30 southwest of American Falls. Interstate 86 Business continues from the interchange on Frontage Road and heads east toward American Falls.

== History ==
By 1927 the SH-37 designation had been assigned to a route south-east of Coeur d'Alene in the northern part of the state. By 1927 the north–south route through Malad City was designated as Idaho State Highway 21, but by 1937 it had been changed to Idaho State Highway 36.

Between 1927 and 1937, the SH-37 designation was assigned to the highway which had been, by 1927, designated as Idaho State Highway 33. This highway followed the current routing of SH-37 from a point southwest of American Falls on what was then U.S. Route 30N (now I-86/US 30) south through Rockland and on through Roy, but then continued on to Holbrook, and then finally heading east to Malad City on modern-day SH-38. Also between 1927 and 1937, the SH-38 designation had been applied to the former SH-32 that began in Roy and headed east and then northeast to Arbon, north to Pauline on Arbon Highway and then north on Bannock Highway to Crystal, and on to terminate in at the former routing of U.S. Route 91 in Portneuf. By 1956, the southern terminus of SH-38 had changed from SH-37 in Roy to SH-37 east of Holbrook via Buist to Arbon. Eventually, the routing of SH-38 was changed to its current route, with the roads through Buist, Arbon, and Crystal to Portneuf being entirely removed from the state highway system; as well as the section that was previously part of SH-37 between Holbrook and the Power County-Oneida County line.

== Major intersections ==
The entire route is in Power County.

Location	mi	km	Destinations	Notes
	0.000	0.000	Rockland Highway	Southern terminus at the Oneida County line
	31.121	50.084	I-86 / US 30 / I-86 BL east (South Frontage Road) – American Falls, Pocatello, Twin Falls	Northern terminus
1.000 mi = 1.609 km; 1.000 km = 0.621 mi: Route transition

== See also ==
- List of state highways in Idaho
