= Register Rock =

Historic site in Power County, Idaho, United States

- U.S. National Register of Historic Places
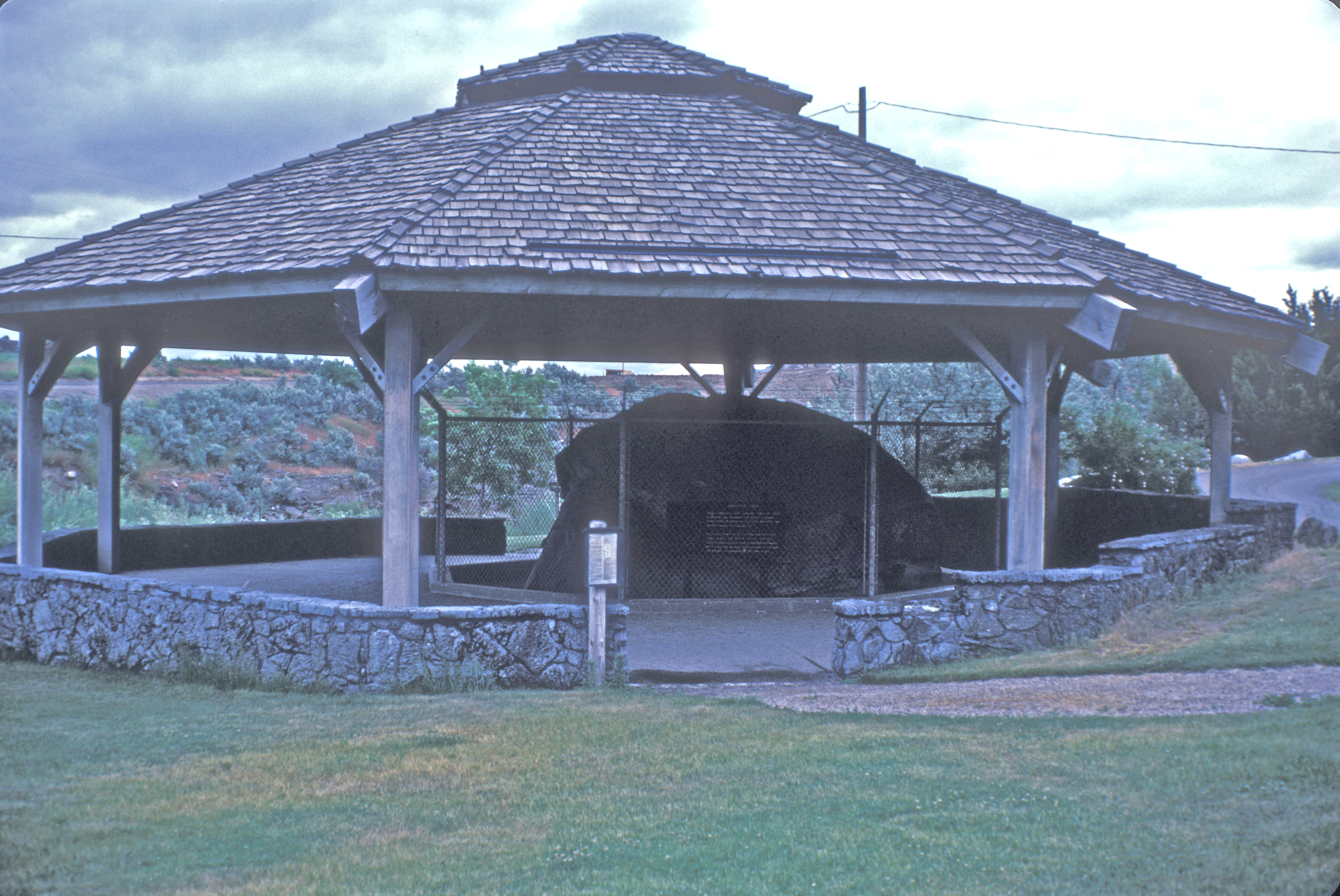
- Register Rock under its protective pavilion, August 2007

- Location within Idaho Location within the United States
- Location: West of American Falls along former routing of U.S. Route 30
- Nearest city: American Falls, Idaho; United States
- Coordinates: 42°39′10″N 113°0′58″W
- Area: less than one acre
- NRHP reference No.: 78001097
- Added to NRHP: July 24, 1978

Register Rock is a historic site along the Oregon and the original California trails in Power County, Idaho, United States. It is listed on the National Register of Historic Places (NFHP).

== Description ==
Register Rock is a historic site where many Oregon Trail emigrants carved their names on a large boulder. It is located along Rock Creek and near the Snake River, roughly 12 miles (19 km) southwest of American Falls along the former routing of U.S. Route 30 (US 30) and near Interstate 86 (with which US 30 now runs concurrent). The rock is located in what is now Massacre Rocks State Park and is protected by a shelter. It is also near a segment of (but not part of) the Oregon Trail Historic District.

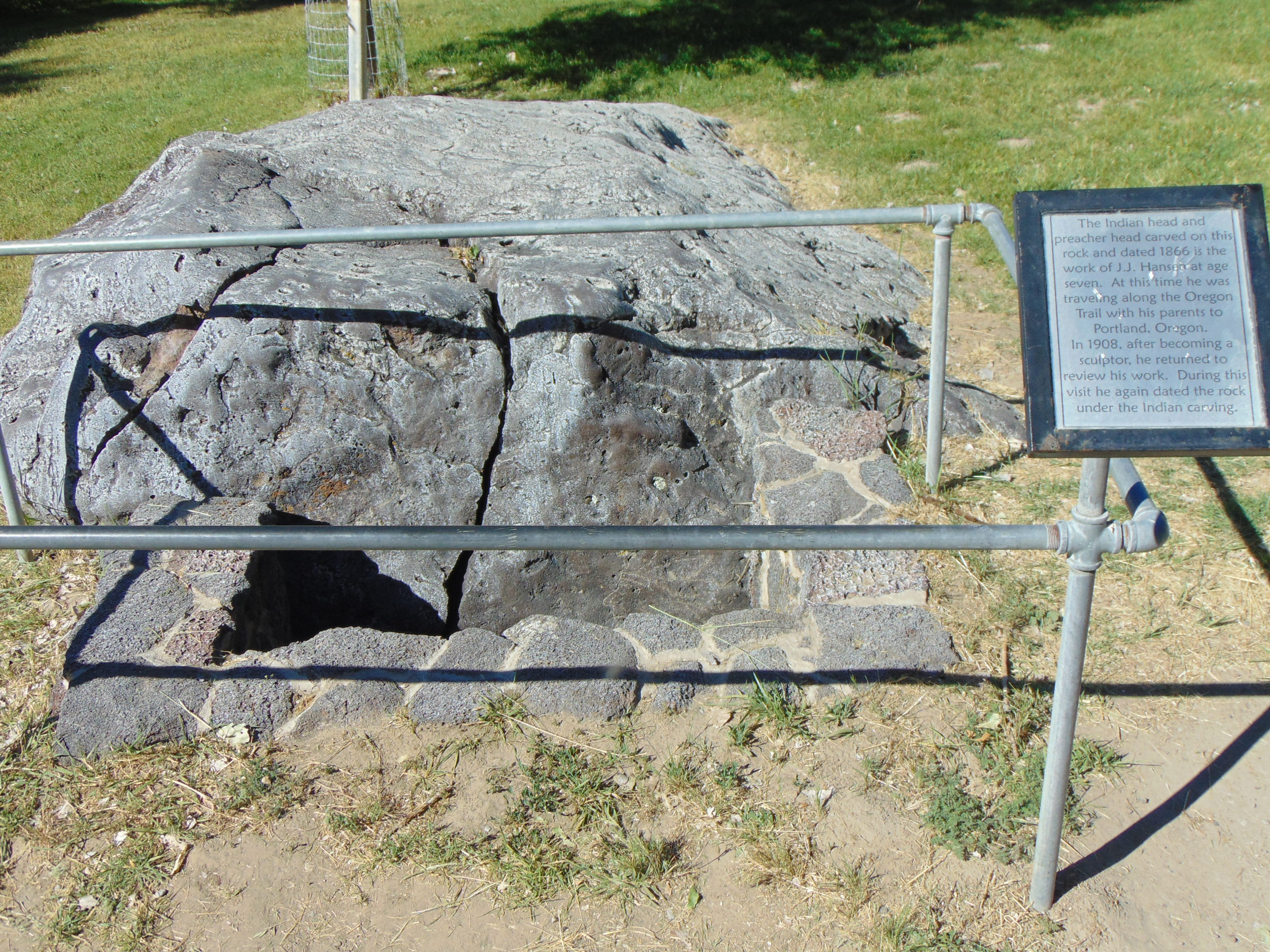
Boulder upon which J.J. Hansen carved his art in 1866, June 2017

Also at the site, roughly 150 feet (46 m) west of Register Rock, is another much smaller (and mostly below ground level) boulder upon which a 7-year-old boy by the name of J.J. Hansen carved an Indian head and preacher head. His original work was completed as he was traveling along the Oregon Trail to Portland with his parents in 1866. Over forty years later, in 1908, he returned to the site and dated the original work.

The site was added to the National Register of Historic Places (NRHP) on July 24, 1978.

== See also ==
- National Register of Historic Places listings in Power County, Idaho
