= Oregon Trail Historic District =

Oregon Trail Historic District may refer to:

- Oregon Trail Historic District (Power County, Idaho), listed on the National Register of Historic Places in Power County, Idaho
- Oregon Trail Historic District (Vale, Oregon), listed on the National Register of Historic Places in Malheur County, Oregon

== See also ==
- Oregon Trail (Ada County, Idaho segment), near Boise, Idaho, listed on the NRHP in Ada County, Idaho
- Vermillion Creek Crossing, Oregon Trail, Belvue, Kansas, listed on the NRHP in Pottawatomie County, Kansas
- Oregon Trail, Wells Springs Segment, Boardman, Oregon, listed on the NRHP in Morrow County, Oregon
- Oregon Trail, Barlow Road Segment, near Wemme, Oregon, listed on the NRHP in Clackamas County, Oregon
- Oregon Trail Ruts (Guernsey, Wyoming), a National Historic Landmark and NRHP-listed in Platte County, Wyoming
