= Oneida Milling and Elevator Company Grain Elevator =

- U.S. National Register of Historic Places
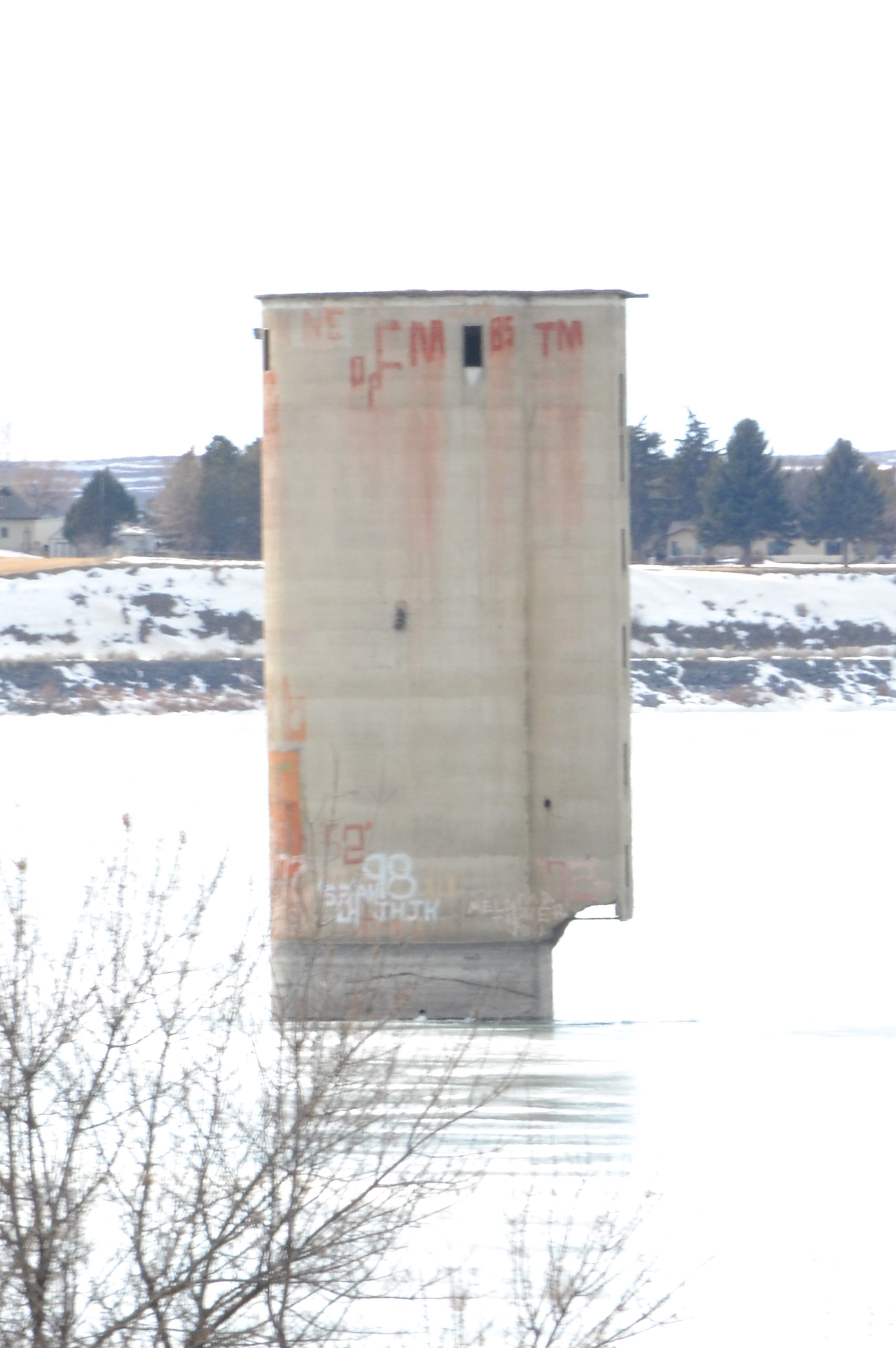

- Location within Idaho
- Nearest city: American Falls, Idaho
- Coordinates: 42°47′05″N 112°52′04″W
- Area: less than one acre
- Built: 1912
- Built by: Flinton Construction Co.
- NRHP reference No.: 93000380
- Added to NRHP: July 16, 1993

The Oneida Milling and Elevator Company Grain Elevator, in Power County, Idaho near American Falls, Idaho, was built in 1912. It was listed on the National Register of Historic Places in 1993.

It is located offshore in the American Falls Reservoir, which covers the original townsite of American Falls.

It was built by the Flinton Construction Co. It has also been known as the Colorado Milling and Elevator Company Grain Elevator.
