= Walter Sparks House =

Historic house in Idaho, United States

- U.S. National Register of Historic Places
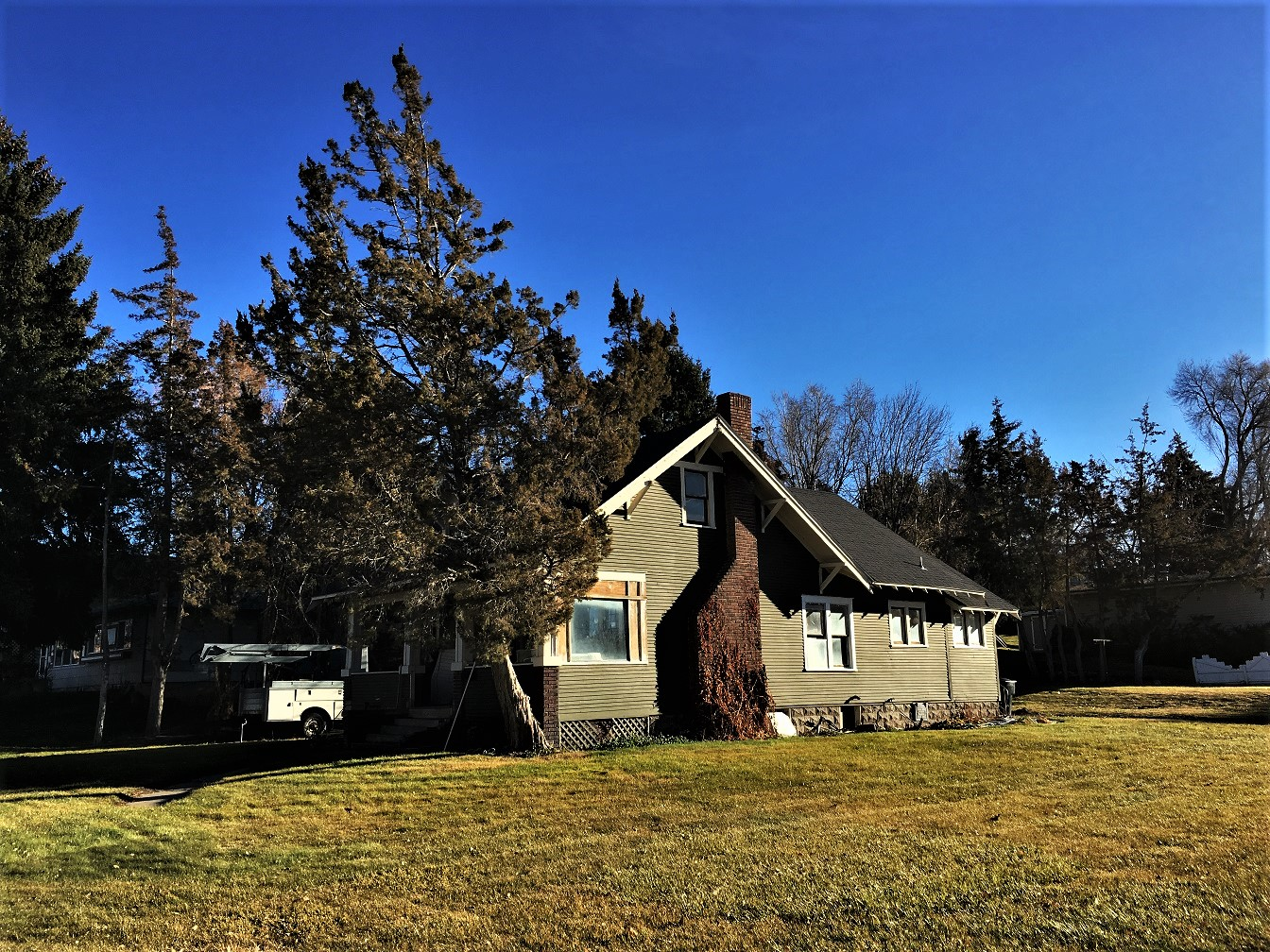

- Location within Idaho Location within the United States
- Location: 408 Roosevelt St. American Falls, Idaho
- Coordinates: 42°46′55″N 112°50′58″W
- Area: less than one acre
- Built: 1907, 1925
- Architectural style: Bungalow/craftsman
- MPS: American Falls, Idaho, Relocated Townsite MPS
- NRHP reference No.: 07000002
- Added to NRHP: February 7, 2007

The Walter Sparks House, at 408 Roosevelt St. in American Falls in Power County, Idaho, was moved to its current location in 1925 by the Bureau of Reclamation, as part of a project to move much of the town of American Falls out of the way of the American Falls Reservoir. The house and its garage were listed on the National Register of Historic Places in 2007.

The house was originally built in 1907. It is a one-and-a-half-story 25 by 34 feet (7.6 m × 10.4 m) Bungalow/Craftsman-style house on a concrete basement. It has an 8 by 25 feet (2.4 m × 7.6 m) inset porch across its front and a rear porch which was added in 1925 after the move. It has also been known as Houk House.
