= Arbon (disambiguation) =

Arbon is a city in the canton of Thurgau in Switzerland.

Arbon may also refer to:

- Arbon (district), in Switzerland
- Arbon, Haute-Garonne, French commune
- Arbon, Idaho
- Arbon Valley, Idaho
