= William Davie House (American Falls, Idaho) =

Historic house in Idaho, United States

- U.S. National Register of Historic Places
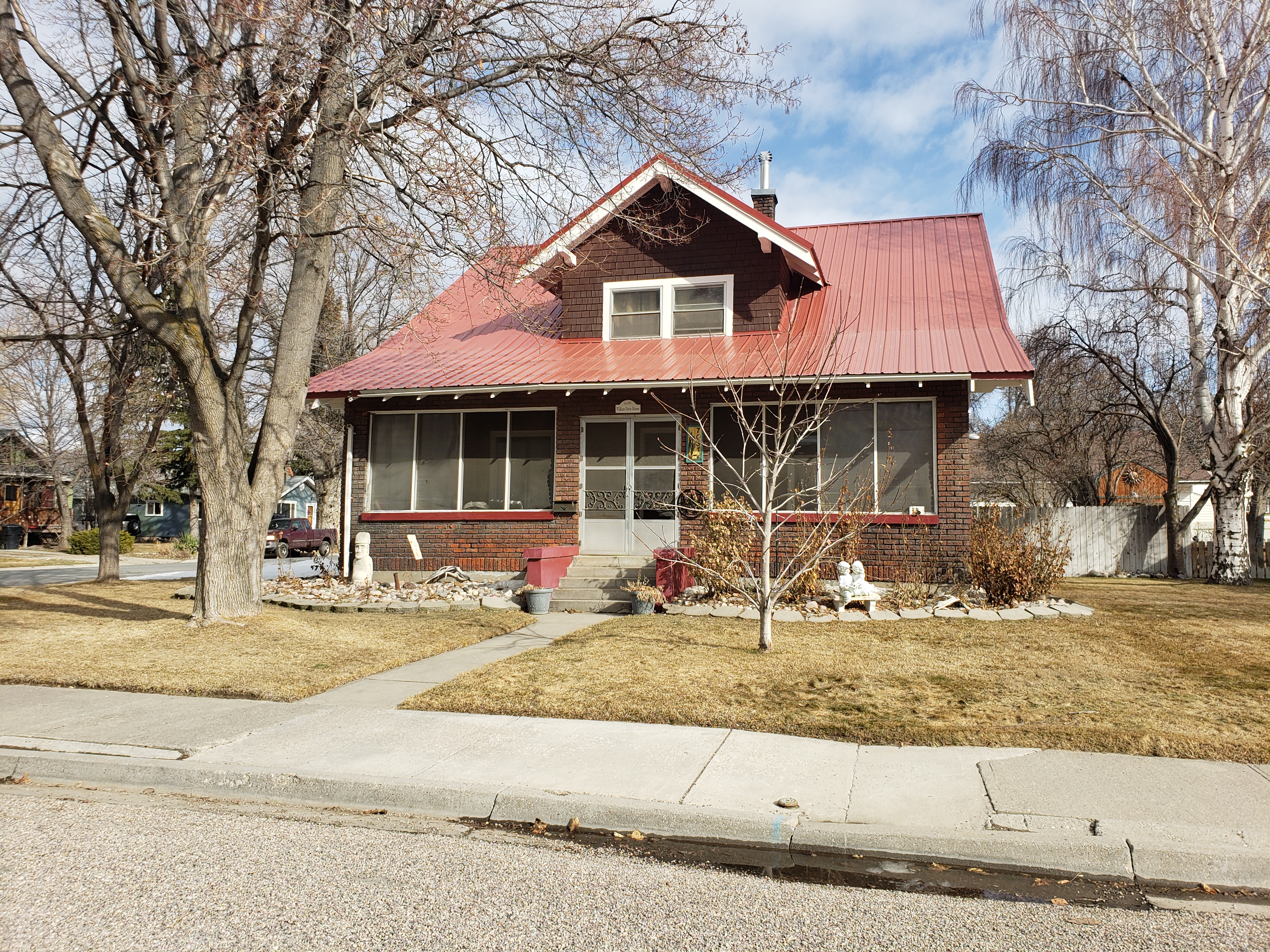

- Location within Idaho Location within the United States
- Location: 703 Hutchinson Ave., American Falls, Idaho
- Coordinates: 42°46′52″N 112°51′14″W
- Area: less than one acre
- Built: c.1911-c.1918, 1925
- Architectural style: Bungalow/craftsman
- MPS: American Falls, Idaho, Relocated Townsite MPS
- NRHP reference No.: 08000252
- Added to NRHP: April 2, 2008

The William Davie House, at 703 Hutchinson Ave. in American Falls in Power County, Idaho, was moved to its current location in 1925. It was listed on the National Register of Historic Places in 2008. It has also been known as Harms House.

It is Bungalow/Craftsman in style. The house is believed to have been built during the period of 1911 to 1918, then it was moved along with many other houses by the Bureau of Reclamation as part of a large Federal project relocating the town of American Falls, making way for the American Falls Reservoir.

It is a 33 by 43 feet (10 m × 13 m) one-and-a-half-story house. The property has a second contributing building, a 20 by 24 feet (6.1 m × 7.3 m) two-car garage.
