= Interstate 86 (Idaho) =

Short Interstate in Idaho

Interstate 86
- I-86 highlighted in red

Route information
- Maintained by ITD
- Length: 62.85 mi (101.15 km)
- Existed: 1978–present
- NHS: Entire route

Major junctions
- West end: I-84 / US 30 near Declo
- SH-37 in American Falls; SH-39 in American Falls; US 30 near Pocatello; US 91 in Chubbuck
- East end: I-15 in Chubbuck

Location
- Country: United States
- State: Idaho
- Counties: Cassia, Power, Bannock

Highway system
- Interstate Highway System; Main; Auxiliary; Suffixed; Business; Future; Idaho State Highway System; Interstate; US; State
← I-84	→ SH-87

Interstate 86 (I-86) is an east–west intrastate Interstate Highway located entirely within the state of Idaho. It runs approximately 63 miles (101 km) from an intersection with I-84 east of Declo in rural Cassia County, to an intersection with I-15 in Chubbuck, just north of Pocatello. The highway is part of the main route from Boise and Twin Falls to Idaho Falls and the upper Snake River region.

I-86 runs through a sparsely populated region along the south side of the Snake River and is mostly concurrent with US Highway 30 (US-30), which it replaced in the 1970s. It passes through American Falls at its midpoint and has a business route that serves the city center. The highway also serves Minidoka National Wildlife Refuge, Massacre Rocks State Park, the Fort Hall Indian Reservation, and Pocatello Regional Airport.

The highway follows a section of the historic Oregon Trail, which was paved and incorporated into US-30N in 1926. Under the original numbering proposal for the Interstate Highway System released in 1957, the highway was supposed to be part of Interstate 82N (I-82N), but it was instead designated as Interstate 15W (I-15W). The first section of the freeway, near American Falls, was completed in 1959. Other sections near Chubbuck and Pocatello were opened in 1968. I-15W was renumbered to I-86 in 1978, shortly before construction of its final section between Raft River and American Falls commenced. The highway was dedicated and opened to traffic on October 11, 1985.

== Route description ==
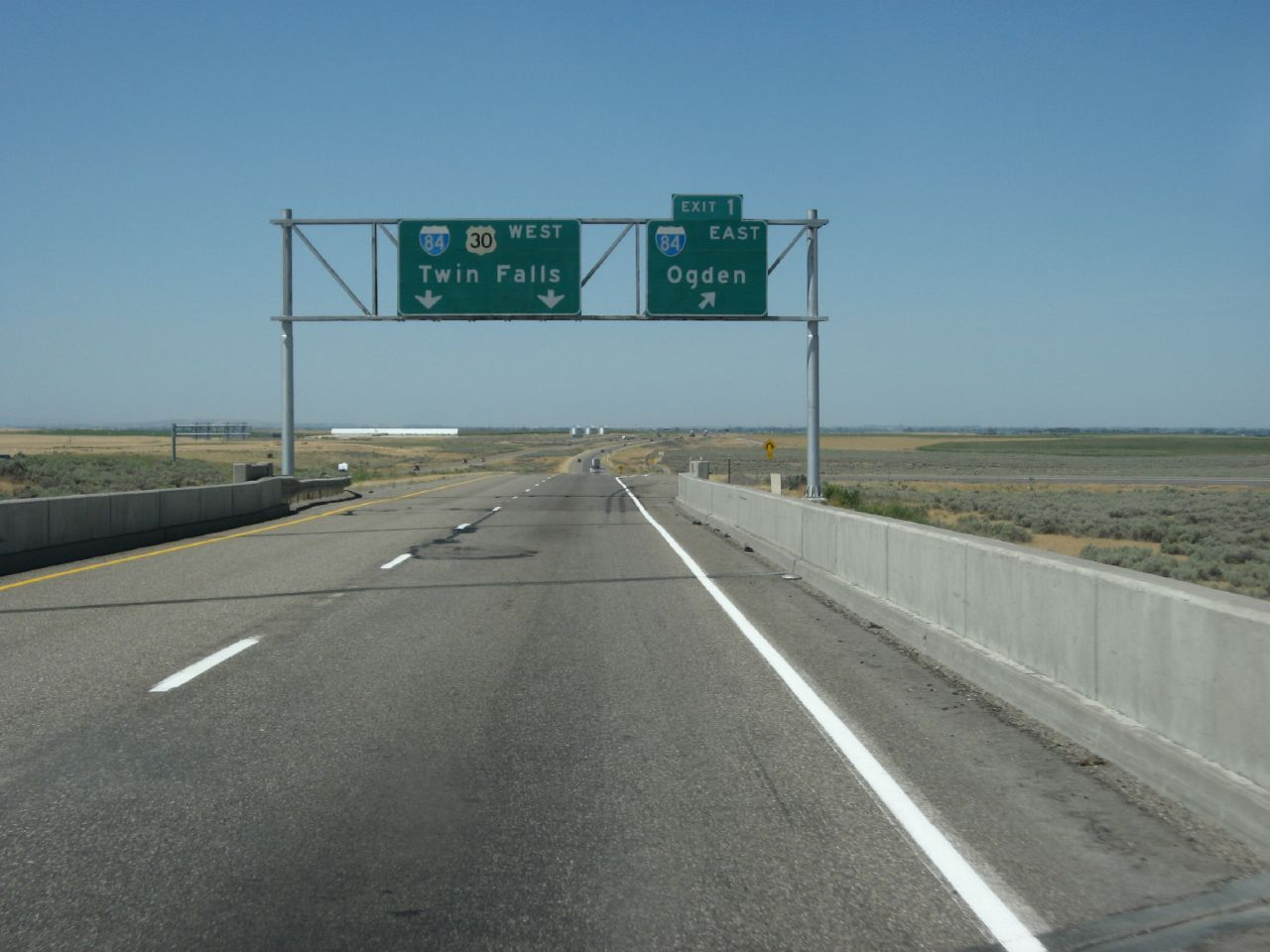
Looking westbound on I-86 at its junction with I-84 near Declo

I-86 begins at an interchange with I-84 and US-30 northeast of Declo. From the interchange, I-84 continues west toward Twin Falls and Boise and southeast toward Salt Lake City, Utah. I-86 travels east, concurrent with US 30, through rural Cassia County for about 14 miles (23 km) to its first exit at Raft River near a crossing of the river of the same name. From Raft River, I-86 follows the Snake River upstream through Minidoka National Wildlife Refuge and crosses into Power County.

The freeway continues northeast between the Snake River and the Sublett Range and passes a set of rest areas near Massacre Rocks State Park, one of the state's most popular tourist attractions. Near Neeley, I-86 passes a wind farm and intersects State Highway 37 (SH-37), which provides a southerly connection to Rockland. A business route of I-86 also terminates at the interchange and continues along the north side of the freeway as it approaches the city of American Falls. I-86 bypasses the city on its east side and intersects the business route and SH-39 near American Falls Airport. From the city, the highway runs along the south side of the American Falls Reservoir and follows a railroad into the Fort Hall Indian Reservation.

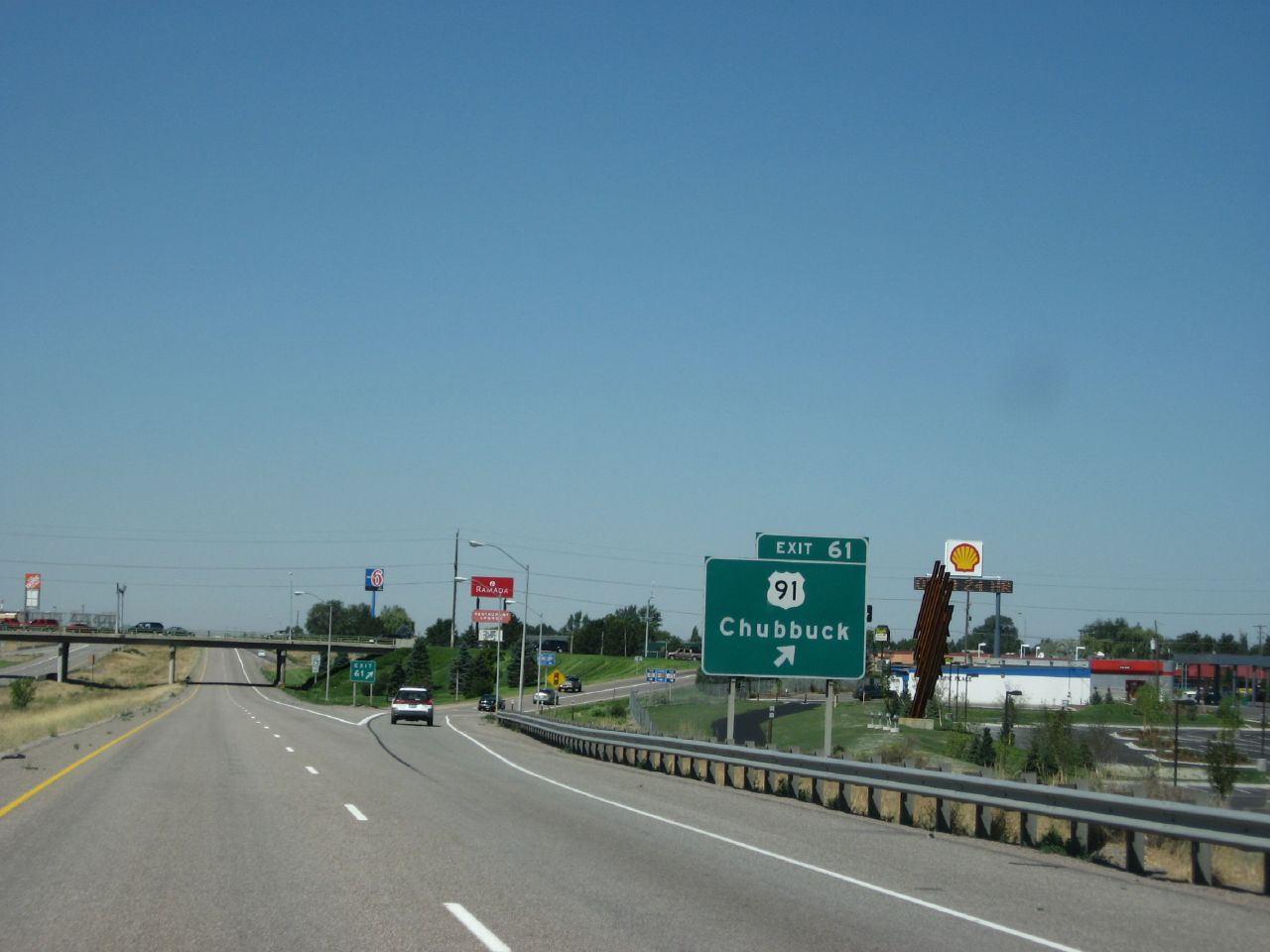
The penultimate interchange on I-86, at US-91 in Chubbuck

I-86 passes through the northern section of the Fort Hall Reservation, serving exits to Arbon Valley and Pocatello Regional Airport. US-30 leaves the freeway at an interchange located between the eastern boundary of the reservation and the Bannock County line on the Portneuf River. US-30 continues southeast into Pocatello while I-86 runs through the northern suburb of Chubbuck. The highway intersects US-91 in a diverging diamond interchange, the first to be built in Idaho, on the northeast side of Pine Ridge Mall. I-86 continues east for approximately one mile (1.6 km) to a directional T interchange with I-15 at the north edge of Pocatello, where it terminates.

At 63 miles (101 km) in length, I-86 is one of the shortest primary Interstate Highways in the contiguous US. The highway is maintained by the Idaho Transportation Department (ITD), which conducts an annual survey of traffic on certain highway segments that is expressed in terms of annual average daily traffic (AADT), a measure of traffic volume for any average day of the year. The busiest section of I-86 is near its eastern terminus in Chubbuck, carrying an average of 27,158 vehicles. The least-traveled section, near Massacre Rocks, sees only 6,759 vehicles on an average day.

== History ==
The route of I-86 largely follows the westernmost section of US-30N, which split from US-30S at Burley and continued east into Wyoming. The corridor was part of the Oregon Trail in the 19th century and was later marked as an auto trail. It was designated as SH-16 in the early 1920s, prior to its incorporation into US-30N in 1926. US-30N was realigned onto a new road near Raft River in 1952, with the intention of upgrading it to a four-lane limited access highway.

In the original plans for the national expressway and freeway system, which would later become the Interstate Highway System, Pocatello was served by two major highways along US-30N and US-91 and a spur route along US-30N that was removed from later plans. After the Interstate plan was approved by the federal government, present-day I-86 was numbered as part of I-82N but was eventually designated in 1958 as I-15W. Construction on the first section of I-15W, a four-lane bypass of American Falls, began in May 1958 and was completed in October 1959. The westernmost stretch of the highway near Raft River was opened in 1963 as part of work on I-80N east of Heyburn. The Chubbuck section of the freeway was opened to traffic in July 1968 and was followed three months later by an extension to Pocatello Air Terminal 4.6 miles (7.4 km) west of the city. I-15W between American Falls and the airport was opened to traffic in September 1972.

US-30N was superseded by US-30 in 1972. In 1973, the American Association of State Highway and Transportation Officials (AASHTO) adopted a new preference for duplicate numbers in lieu of suffixed designations. As a result, I-15W was redesignated as I-86 in 1978; it was originally submitted as part of I-84 (the successor to I-80N). By 1980, most of the freeway was completed, except for a 21-mile (34 km) section between Raft River and American Falls that was graded and scheduled to be temporarily paved. The final four-lane section was constructed at a cost of $33 million (equivalent to $124 million in 2024) beginning in 1978 and was dedicated on October 11, 1985. The highway's construction was delayed by careful rock blasting next to utility lines, historic sites, and native wildlife habitats.

The interchange with US-91 in Chubbuck was later rebuilt in 2013 as the state's first diverging diamond interchange, which helped reduce the rate of collisions at the interchange. ITD then rebuilt the interchanges at the western and eastern termini of I-86 to meet modern standards and improve safety. Reconstruction of the western interchange at I-84 near Declo began in May 2018 and was completed in late 2020, replacing the trumpet configuration with a modified Y. A major rebuild of the eastern interchange at I-15 in Chubbuck began in August 2022 and was completed in 2025 at a cost of $112 million. The new design eliminated left-side ramps from I-15 and allows traffic from the Pocatello Creek Road interchange to merge onto either freeway.

== Exit list ==
County	Location	mi	km	Exit	Destinations	Notes
Cassia		0.000	0.000	1	I-84 / US 30 west – Twin Falls, Ogden, Salt Lake City	Western terminus; west end of US-30 overlap
Cassia		14.807	23.830	15	Raft River Area	
Power		20.590	33.136	21	Coldwater Area	
Power		28.100	45.223	28	Massacre Rocks State Park	
Power		32.620	52.497	33	Neeley Area	
Power	American Falls	36.123	58.134	36	SH-37 south / I-86 BL east – Rockland, American Falls	
Power	American Falls	40.110	64.551	40	SH-39 north / I-86 BL west – Aberdeen, American Falls	
Power		44.327	71.337	44	Seagull Bay	
Power		49.152	79.102	49	Rainbow Road	
Power	Arbon Valley	52.491	84.476	52	Arbon Valley	
Power	Pocatello	55.551	89.401	56	Pocatello Regional Airport	
Power		58.087	93.482	58	US 30 east – West Pocatello	East end of US-30 overlap
Bannock	Chubbuck	61.268	98.601	61	US 91 (Yellowstone Avenue) – Chubbuck, Pocatello	
Bannock	Chubbuck	62.850	101.147	63	I-15 – Idaho Falls, Salt Lake City	Eastern terminus; signed as exits 63A (south) & 63B (north)
1.000 mi = 1.609 km; 1.000 km = 0.621 mi: Concurrency terminus

== Business route ==
Interstate 86 Business
- Location: American Falls
- Length: 4.605 mi (7.411 km)
- Existed: 1972–present

Interstate 86 Business (I-86 Bus) is a business route of I-86 that runs between two interchanges in American Falls. It travels northeast from the SH-37 interchange into downtown American Falls on Lincoln Street and Fort Hall Avenue, following the former route of US-30N. The route turns west onto Idaho Street for two blocks and crosses over a railroad before beginning its concurrency with SH-39 around the northwestern side of the city. The highways turn northeast onto Pocatello Avenue, which leads to an interchange with I-86 on the south side of American Falls Airport.

The business route was originally created in 1972 as I-15W Bus, replacing a section of SH-37 within American Falls.

=== Major intersections ===
The entire route is in American Falls, Power County.

mi	km	Destinations	Notes
0.000	0.000	I-86 west / US 30 west / SH-37 south – Twin Falls, Rockland	Western terminus
2.942	4.735	SH-39 north – Aberdeen, Blackfoot	West end of SH-39 overlap
4.605	7.411	I-86 east / US 30 east – Pocatello, Idaho Falls	Eastern terminus; east end of SH-39 overlap
1.000 mi = 1.609 km; 1.000 km = 0.621 mi: Concurrency terminus
