= American Falls High School =

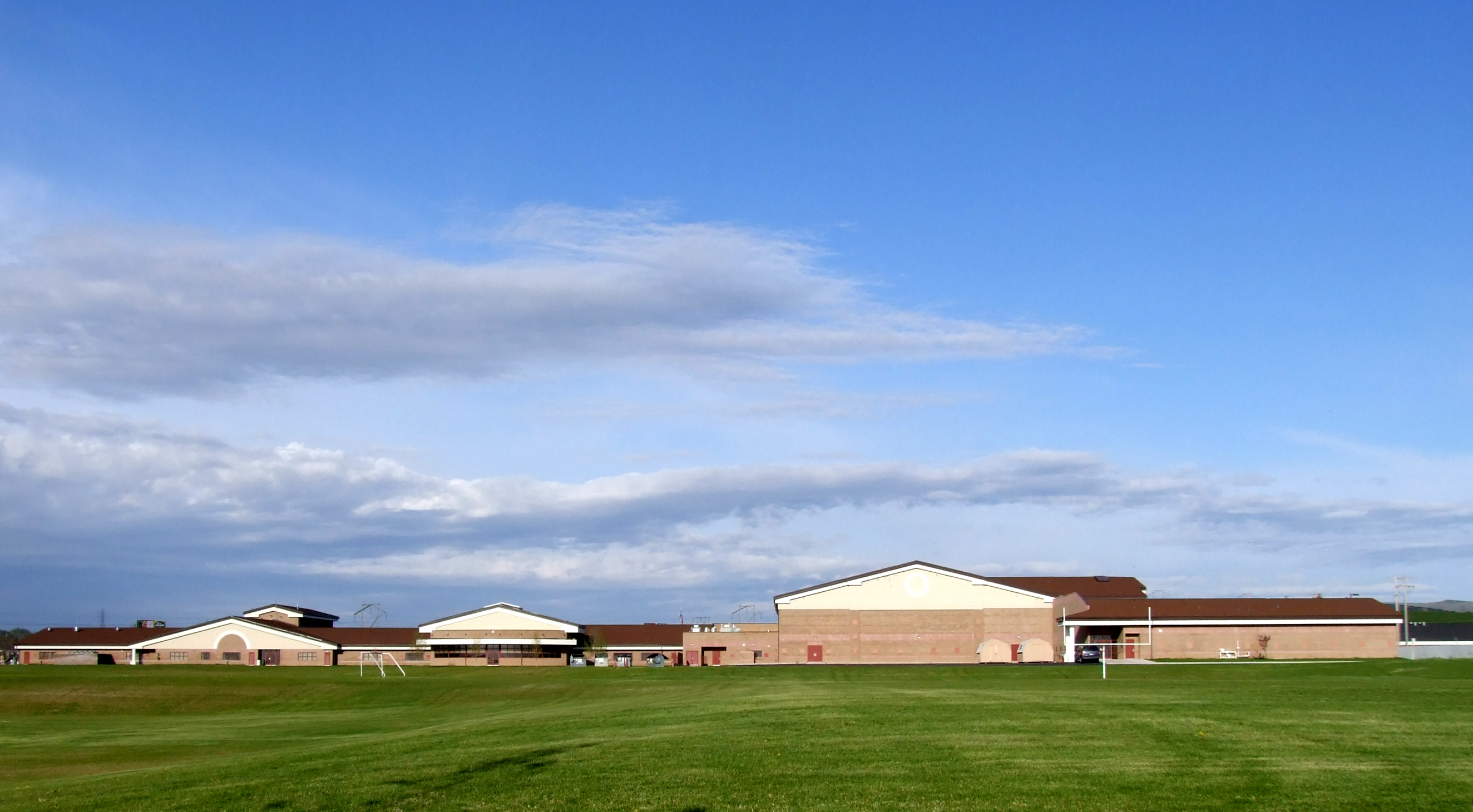

Location
- 2966 South Frontage Road; American Falls, Idaho 83211; United States; 42°45′55″N 112°51′50″W

Information
- Type: Public
- School district: American Falls Joint School District#381
- Superintendent: Randy Jensen
- Principal: Travis Hansen
- Teaching staff: 27.17 (on a FTE basis)
- Grades: 9-12
- Enrollment: 442 (2023–2024)
- Student to teacher ratio: 16.27
- Colors: Red, white, black
- Mascot: Oscar the Beaver
- Nickname: Beavers
- Accreditation: Cognia (AdvancED)
- Website: www.sd381.k12.id.us/o/afhs/

American Falls High School is a public secondary school located in American Falls, Idaho. It was established prior to 1909, and the most recent school building was completed in 2002 on the south west end of American Falls.

== Description ==
American Falls High School houses grades nine through twelve. The newest building in the district, at approximately 142,000 square feet, it has 40 classrooms, a media center, a 1,477 seat gymnasium, and an auditorium that will seat 881 people.

== History ==
The first American Falls settlement was located on the west bank of the Snake River. The first record of a school in that location credits pioneer Thomas Duncan, from Indiana, with helping to build the school there, sometime after his arrival in 1879.

The town of American Falls was moved across the river in 1888, and a news report dated 1909 said an official representative of the University of Idaho was "much pleased with the work and very much surprised at the growth in attendance" at the school, ensuring accreditation and allowing graduates to enter the university without examination. The same report quoted another visitor, who said: "I found a mighty good school in a mighty poor building."

Settler W. T. McDermitt was reported to be working on another new school building in January 1909. The fourth high school class in that building (of three students) graduated in 1913. In 1917, at the start of World War I, there were eight graduates, all women.

American Falls High School was first accredited in 1920.

The enrollment in 1921 with a record-breaking freshman class was approximately 100 students, substantially higher than the 1920 enrollment of 75 students.

To make way for the new American Falls Dam on the Snake River, the Bureau of Reclamation in 1925 began moving American Falls again: "344 residents, 46 businesses, three hotels, one school, five churches, one hospital, six grain elevators, and one flour mill were moved from the original town site, making this the largest government relocation project of its time."

In 1935 a new high school building, built at a cost of US$100,000, was dedicated by Senator William E. Borah. It was described as "one of the best educational plants in the state". By March 1964, a two-story addition for classrooms and science laboratories was begun, to be completed by the beginning of the following school year. The school board also approved plans for a "gymnasium – music room – cafeteria complex" at a cost of $420,000.

In June 1996, school trustees prepared plans for a new school that would cost approximately $13 million, and planned for the old high school building to house primary grades three through five. However, a seismic analysis conducted in 1997 revealed the old gymnasium and adjacent classrooms were not structurally sound enough to withstand an earthquake, and noted the front of the new section had sustained a 1.5 inch crack from the basement to the roof due to building settlement. Structurally, there were also deficiencies with the roof and the walls, which were likely to collapse in a seismic event, making retrofitting unfeasible.

Voters approved a 20-year bond for a new high school building that opened in 2002. In June 2003, 103 seniors and their families were the first to celebrate graduation in the new gymnasium.

Graduates in 2020 were celebrated with outdoor ceremonies on the football field of an elementary school. The school had submitted a COVID-19 compliant plan to Southeastern Idaho Public Health to gain approval of the ceremonies and ensure the safety of participants. Radio station KISU-FM of Idaho State University broadcast the ceremonies. To honor graduates, the event was followed buy a parade of vehicles from the field to the high school.

Principal Travis Hansen said 44% of the 92 graduates in 2020 had already enrolled in college classes.

== Curriculum ==
American Falls High School offers college preparatory coursework (English, math, foreign language, humanities, natural science, social science, and communication), as well as vocational courses, performing arts and studio arts classes.

== Extracurricular activities ==
Extra curricular activities include a variety of sports, instrumental and vocal music, debate, drama and speech.

In the 1936 Portland Rose Festival, American Falls High School won prize in prep school division, class one, band competition, for their marching ability.

Two seniors from the school's debate team became leaders on opposite sides of education reform in 2011, making the school "a font of activism", according to the Idaho Statesman.

Marc Beitia, Idaho's Teacher of the Year in 2018, helped start the school's agriculture program in 1990, and has sponsored its national award-winning Future Farmer of America chapter.

María Sánchez, a Mexican women's national team soccer player, started her career playing for the high school team because no club teams were nearby nor could her parents afford to get her on an elite club team. Her number was later retired.
