= Roy, Idaho =

Unincorporated community in Power County, Idaho, United States

- Unincorporated community
- Location in Idaho Location in the United States
- Coordinates: 42°21′50″N 112°49′52″W
- Country: United States
- State: Idaho
- County: Power
- Elevation: 5,109 ft (1,557 m)
- Time zone: UTC-7 (Mountain (MST))
  - Summer (DST): UTC-6 (MDT)
- ZIP Code: 83271
- Area codes: 208, 986
- GNIS feature ID: 389685

Roy is an unincorporated community in Power County, Idaho, United States. Roy is located on Idaho State Highway 37 14.5 miles (23.3 km) south of Rockland.

== History ==
Roy's population was 200 in 1925, and 70 in 1940.
