= Pleasantview, Idaho =

Unincorporated community in the state of Idaho, United States

- Unincorporated community
- Location within Idaho Location within the United States
- Coordinates: 42°09′22″N 112°20′16″W
- Country: United States
- State: Idaho
- County: Oneida
- Elevation: 4,485 ft (1,367 m)
- Time zone: UTC-7 (Mountain (MST))
  - Summer (DST): UTC-6 (MDT)
- Area codes: 208, 986
- GNIS feature ID: 397051

Pleasantview is an unincorporated community in Oneida County, Idaho, United States. Pleasantview is located on Idaho State Highway 38 5 miles (8.0 km) west-southwest of Malad City.
