= Neeley, Idaho =

Unincorporated community in Power County, Idaho, United States

- Unincorporated community
- Location in Idaho Location in the United States
- Coordinates: 42°44′01″N 112°54′54″W
- Country: United States
- State: Idaho
- County: Power
- Elevation: 4,321 ft (1,317 m)
- Time zone: UTC-7 (Mountain (MST))
  - Summer (DST): UTC-6 (MDT)
- Area codes: 208, 986
- GNIS feature ID: 374109

Neeley is an unincorporated community in Power County, Idaho, United States. It is located just south of the Snake River along Interstate 86 / U.S. Route 30, 5 miles (8.0 km) southwest of American Falls.
