= Massacre Rocks State Park =

State park in Power County, Idaho, United States

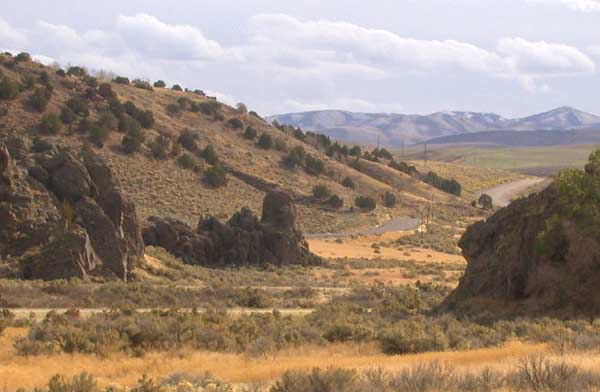
- Massacre Rocks, viewed from the visitor center

- Location within Idaho Location within the United States
- Location: Power County, Idaho, United States
- Nearest city: American Falls, Idaho
- Coordinates: 42°40′51″N 112°59′01″W
- Area: 990 acres (400 ha)
- Elevation: 4,400 ft (1,300 m)
- Established: 1967
- Administrator: Idaho Department of Parks and Recreation
- Website: Official website

Massacre Rocks State Park is a history-focused public recreation area in the Northwest United States featuring the Massacre Rocks, a famous spot along the Oregon Trail and California Trail during the middle 19th century. The state park is located along the Snake River and Rock Creek, ten miles (16 km) southwest of American Falls, in Power County, Idaho, United States.

== Description ==
The park features a configuration of boulders along the south bank of the Snake River, known alternatively as Massacre Rocks, "Gate of Death", or "Devil's Gate". Settlers gave this name to the narrow passage of the trail through the rocks, from the fear of possible ambush by Native Americans. According to diaries of settlers, settlers in five wagons clashed with Shoshone just east of the rocks on August 9–10, 1862. At least eight settlers from four wagon trains died, with at least 20 Shoshone also killed. The skirmishes took place east of the park and not at Devil's Gate as commonly believed. Some confrontations may have occurred there, but they remain unverified. The Clark Massacre of 1851 occurred just west of Massacre Rocks, closer to the Raft River.

The rocks were often used as campsite for wagon trains along the trail. Many emigrants carved their names and dates on Register Rock, which is now protected by a shelter. The actual passage through the rocks is now the route of Interstate 86 along the south edge of the park.

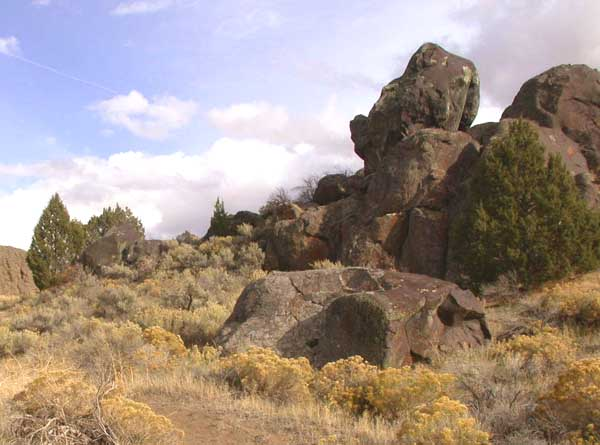
Boulders deposited during the Bonneville Flood

Geologically, the park was created during the repeated volcanic activity on the Snake River Plain. The rocks themselves were deposited in their present location at the end of the last ice age, approximately 14,500 years ago, during the catastrophic flood known as the Bonneville Flood, when much of Lake Bonneville surged down the Snake River. A notch in the cliff on the north bank of the Snake opposite the park was the site of an ancient waterfall of a side channel of the waters in the aftermath of the flood.

Massacre Rocks became a state park in 1967, following earlier status as a roadside park managed by the Idaho Department of Transportation.

== Wildlife ==
This state park is home to various birds which are Canada goose, great blue heron, grebe, pelican, bald eagle. The only residential mammals are beaver, jackrabbit, cottontail, muskrat and coyote.

== Activities and amenities ==
The park is accessible by automobile on Interstate 86 and by foot using a trail from the rest areas just east of the park on Interstate 86. The footpaths also provide access to remnants of the original Oregon Trail on the south side of the highway. Exhibits in the park's visitor center describe the history and geology of the park. The park offers trails for hiking and biking, a disc golf course, campground, and access to the Snake River.

== Climate ==
According to the Köppen Climate Classification system, Massacre Rocks State Park has a cold semi-arid climate, abbreviated "BSk" on climate maps. The hottest temperature recorded in Massacre Rocks State Park was 108 °F (42.2 °C) on August 8, 1990, while the coldest temperature recorded was −30 °F (−34.4 °C) on January 18, 1984.

Climate data for Massacre Rocks State Park, Idaho, 1991–2020 normals, extremes 1973–present
Month	Jan	Feb	Mar	Apr	May	Jun	Jul	Aug	Sep	Oct	Nov	Dec	Year
Record high °F (°C)	60 (16)	71 (22)	79 (26)	90 (32)	98 (37)	106 (41)	107 (42)	108 (42)	103 (39)	92 (33)	77 (25)	67 (19)	108 (42)
Mean maximum °F (°C)	50.4 (10.2)	55.9 (13.3)	69.2 (20.7)	78.9 (26.1)	86.5 (30.3)	95.4 (35.2)	101.4 (38.6)	100.9 (38.3)	94.6 (34.8)	82.3 (27.9)	66.3 (19.1)	52.4 (11.3)	102.6 (39.2)
Mean daily maximum °F (°C)	34.8 (1.6)	39.3 (4.1)	50.9 (10.5)	58.7 (14.8)	68.0 (20.0)	78.2 (25.7)	89.0 (31.7)	88.2 (31.2)	77.4 (25.2)	62.2 (16.8)	46.6 (8.1)	34.9 (1.6)	60.7 (15.9)
Daily mean °F (°C)	26.0 (−3.3)	30.1 (−1.1)	39.2 (4.0)	45.7 (7.6)	53.7 (12.1)	62.1 (16.7)	70.9 (21.6)	70.0 (21.1)	60.1 (15.6)	48.0 (8.9)	35.4 (1.9)	26.3 (−3.2)	47.3 (8.5)
Mean daily minimum °F (°C)	17.3 (−8.2)	20.9 (−6.2)	27.4 (−2.6)	32.6 (0.3)	39.3 (4.1)	46.1 (7.8)	52.8 (11.6)	51.7 (10.9)	42.8 (6.0)	33.8 (1.0)	24.2 (−4.3)	17.7 (−7.9)	33.9 (1.0)
Mean minimum °F (°C)	−0.6 (−18.1)	4.0 (−15.6)	14.0 (−10.0)	21.9 (−5.6)	28.7 (−1.8)	35.7 (2.1)	44.1 (6.7)	41.9 (5.5)	31.4 (−0.3)	21.7 (−5.7)	9.1 (−12.7)	0.7 (−17.4)	−5.3 (−20.7)
Record low °F (°C)	−30 (−34)	−24 (−31)	−10 (−23)	15 (−9)	15 (−9)	29 (−2)	30 (−1)	31 (−1)	21 (−6)	4 (−16)	−8 (−22)	−26 (−32)	−30 (−34)
Average precipitation inches (mm)	1.48 (38)	1.05 (27)	1.32 (34)	1.62 (41)	1.56 (40)	1.00 (25)	0.45 (11)	0.58 (15)	0.88 (22)	1.07 (27)	1.13 (29)	1.35 (34)	13.49 (343)
Average snowfall inches (cm)	3.0 (7.6)	1.9 (4.8)	0.4 (1.0)	0.1 (0.25)	0.2 (0.51)	0.0 (0.0)	0.0 (0.0)	0.0 (0.0)	0.0 (0.0)	0.2 (0.51)	0.9 (2.3)	2.7 (6.9)	9.4 (23.87)
Average precipitation days (≥ 0.01 in)	10.0	8.6	8.6	10.0	10.7	6.9	4.3	5.8	5.7	7.7	8.4	10.3	97.0
Average snowy days (≥ 0.1 in)	2.4	1.2	0.3	0.0	0.0	0.0	0.0	0.0	0.0	0.1	0.6	0.8	5.4
Source 1: NOAA
Source 2: National Weather Service (snow/snow days 1981–2010)

== See also ==
- List of Idaho state parks
