= Pine Ridge Mall =

Coordinates: 42.94267°N 112.4667°W

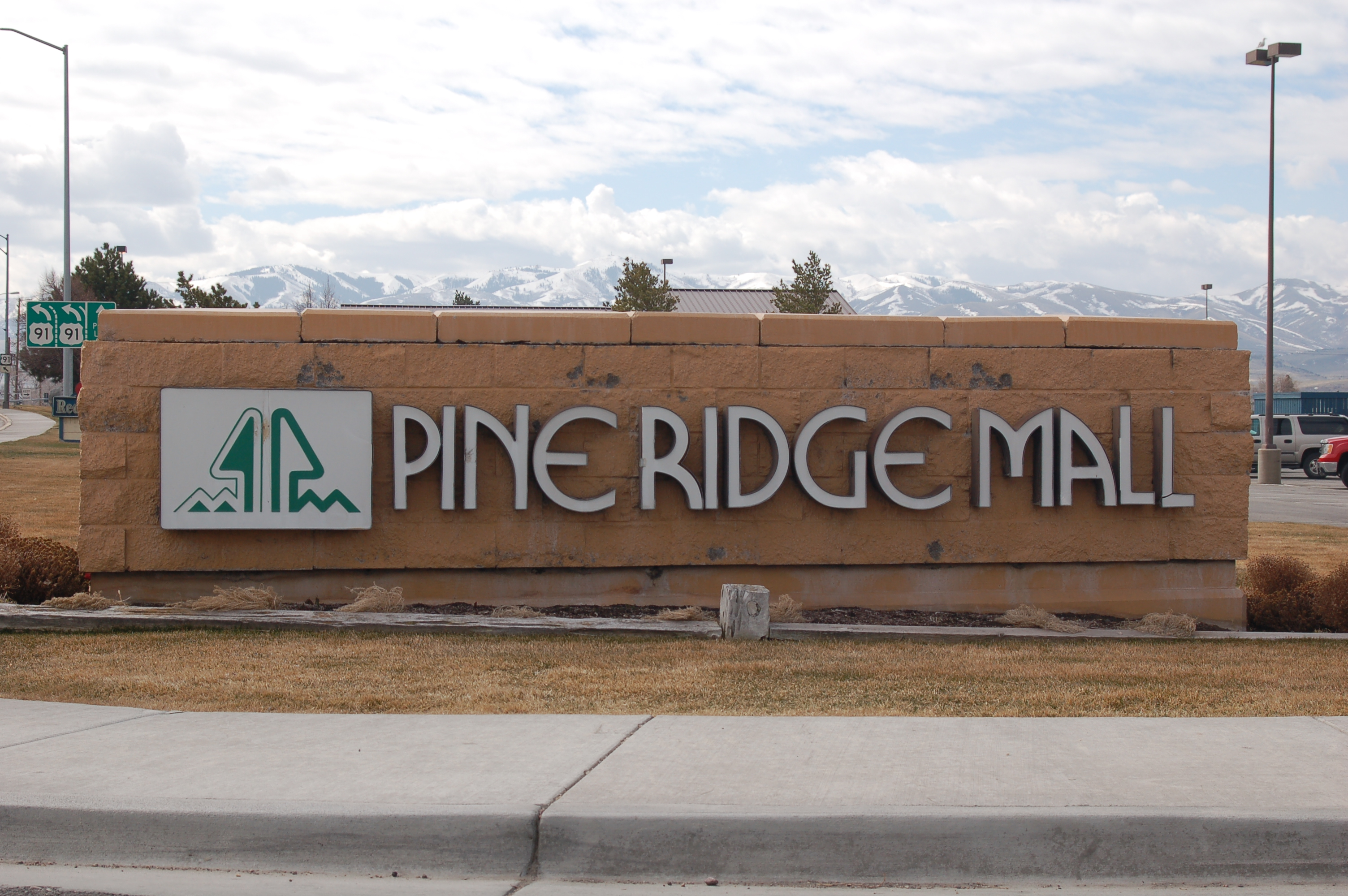
- Road sign at Pine Ridge Mall
- Location: Chubbuck, Idaho
- Address: 4155 Yellowstone Highway
- Opened: 1981
- Closed: June 1, 2025; 17 months ago (interior of the mall)
- Developer: Price Development Corporation
- Owner: SimonCRE
- Num. of stores: 0
- Num. of anchor tenants: 4
- Floor area: 646,000 square feet (60,000 m^{2})
- Floors: 1

Pine Ridge Mall is a shopping center located in Chubbuck, Idaho, near Interstate 86. It originally opened as an enclosed shopping mall in 1981 and was developed by Price Development Corporation. The shopping center is owned by SimonCRE and the anchor tenants are C-A-L Ranch Stores, Gem Prep, Hobby Lobby and Planet Fitness.

== History ==
Pine Ridge Mall opened in 1981 as an enclosed mall with The Bon Marché, JCPenney, and ZCMI as anchor stores. An expansion in the 1990s added Sears, which moved from the now-demolished Pocatello Mall, and Shopko.

In 2001, Dillard's acquired four ZCMI stores, including the Pine Ridge Mall location. Dillard's closed in 2008 and was replaced by Herberger's in 2012.

In 2005, The Bon Marché was rebranded as Macy's and, in August 2006, was closed. The Macy's building was briefly occupied by Party Palace, before C-A-L Ranch Stores opened in the space in 2014.

In November 2013, General Growth Properties sold the mall to Farmer Holding Co. for $9.05 million. In August 2014, Sears announced that they will be closing their store in the mall in November 2014. A Hobby Lobby store was added to mall in September 2016. On January 31, 2018, The Bon-Ton announced that Herberger's would also be closing in April 2018 as part of a plan to close 42 stores nationwide. Planet Fitness opened in a portion of the vacant Herberger's store in January 2019. On January 17, 2019, it was announced that Gem Prep, a charter school, would be open the former Sears in summer 2019. On February 6, 2019, Shopko announced that it would be closing as part of a plan to close 251 stores nationwide. The store closed in May 2019. In 2022, C-A-L Ranch Stores will relocate from its current location in the mall to a portion of the Shopko building.

=== Redevelopment ===
In May 2024, the mall was sold to Scottsdale, Arizona-based SimonCRE and plans were announced to redevelop the mall from an enclosed shopping mall into an open-air retail center with Kohl's as a new anchor store.

On February 6, 2025, JCPenney announced it would close its store at the mall on May 25. On February 26, Target confirmed plans to build a 128,000 sq ft (11,900 m^{2}) store at the mall. Demolition of the mall began on June 2, following the closure of remaining interior tenants on June 1. Construction of the Target store began in early 2026 with an opening planned for early 2027. Plans for a Kohl's store were dropped in February 2026.
