= Oregon Trail (Ada County, Idaho segment) =

Historic place near Boise, Idaho

- U.S. National Register of Historic Places
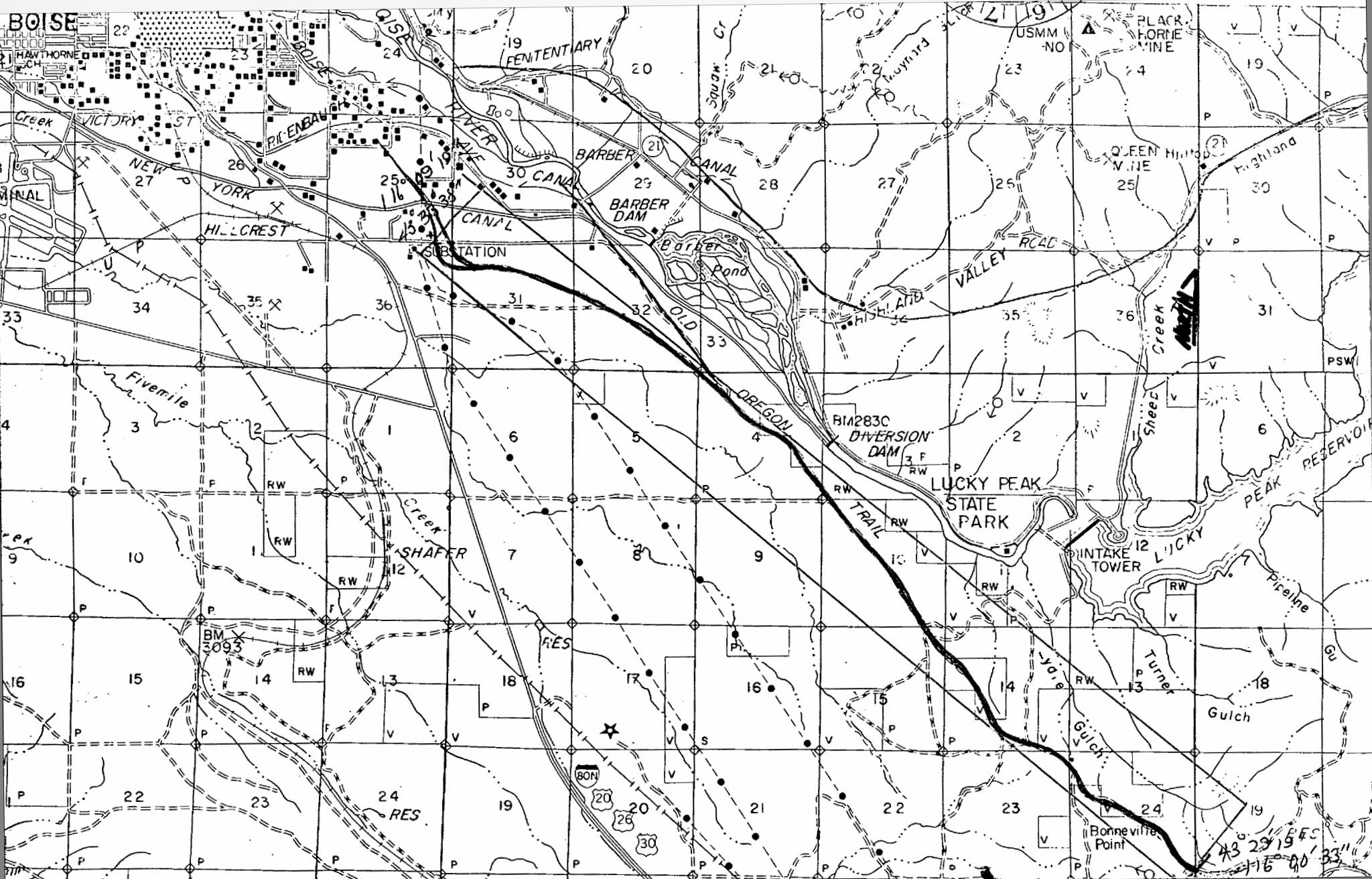
- The Oregon Trail segment as depicted in 1972

- Location within Idaho Location within the United States
- Nearest city: Boise, Idaho
- Coordinates: 43°33′45″N 116°09′19″W
- Area: 0 acres (0 ha)
- Built: 1840
- NRHP reference No.: 72000435
- Added to NRHP: October 18, 1972

The Oregon Trail (Ada County, Idaho segment) near Boise, Idaho, includes approximately eight miles of the Oregon Trail as it entered the Boise Valley. The segment was added to the National Register of Historic Places (NRHP) in 1972. At the time of the NRHP nomination, wagon tracks from the Oregon Trail could be identified almost continuously from the northwest and northeast quadrants of Section 36, Range 2 East, Township 2 North through the northwest and northeast quadrants of both Section 31, Range 3 East, Township 2 North and Section 24, Range 3 East, Township 1 North. In places along the segment the wagon tracks were eight tracks wide. The length of the segment is roughly from 43.56055556°N 116.15527778°W to 43.5143915°N 116.1526384°W.

The Oregon Trail Reserve is a 77-acre site managed by Boise Parks and Recreation, and the area includes part of the Oregon Trail segment designated by the NRHP in 1972. Nearby is the Oregon Trail Recreation Area, another part of the NRHP segment managed by Boise Parks and Recreation.

Although the Oregon Trail followed the segment identified in the NRHP listing, it then continued along the route of what is now Boise Avenue. The Capitol Boulevard Memorial Bridge, also known as the Oregon Trail Memorial Bridge, is located where the Oregon Trail crossed the Boise River by ferry and proceeded through Boise City west toward Caldwell. A series of 21 obelisks now mark the route of the Oregon Trail through Boise.

== Oregon Trail in Idaho ==
In the 1830s explorers Nathaniel Wyeth and Benjamin Bonneville traversed the South Pass through the Rocky Mountains into the Oregon Country. Wyeth established Fort Hall in 1834 at what is now southeastern Idaho. Also in 1834, Thomas McKay established Fort Boise in the southwest of Idaho. By the 1840s, the route between the two forts had become a well traveled part of the Oregon Trail. Although he may not have visited the region, geographer Samuel Augustus Mitchell wrote of the landscape, "The region lying between the Rocky and Blue mountains is rocky, barren and broken; stupendous mountain spurs traverse it in all directions, affording little level ground, and on its elevated portions snow lies nearly all the year. It rarely rains here, and no dew falls."

Fort Boise was abandoned in 1854, but a new Fort Boise was established in 1863 at a location farther east. Boise City was platted adjacent to the new fort in 1863.

In 1906 Ezra Meeker placed the first marker in Boise to commemorate the Oregon Trail. The marker is visible at the southeast corner of the Idaho State Capitol grounds.

== See also ==
- Route of the Oregon Trail
