= Arbon Valley, Idaho =

Census-designated place in Power County, Idaho, United States

- Census-designated place
- Location of Arbon Valley, Idaho
- Coordinates: 42°53′03″N 112°36′30″W
- Country: United States
- State: Idaho
- County: Power

Area
  - Total: 34.1 sq mi (88 km^{2})
  - Land: 34.1 sq mi (88 km^{2})
  - Water: 0.04 sq mi (0.10 km^{2})
- Elevation: 4,554 ft (1,388 m)

Population (2010)
  - Total: 599
  - Density: 17.6/sq mi (6.78/km^{2})
- Time zone: UTC-7 (Mountain (MST))
  - Summer (DST): UTC-6 (MDT)
- Area codes: 208, 986
- FIPS code: 16-02935
- GNIS feature ID: 2407754

Arbon Valley is a census-designated place (CDP) in Power County, Idaho, in the United States. As of the 2020 census, Arbon Valley had a population of 666. It lies within the Fort Hall Indian Reservation, just west of the city of Pocatello.

== History ==
The valley in which Arbon Valley is located was named after George Dennis Arbon, an early settler.

== Geography ==
According to the United States Census Bureau, the CDP has a total area of 34.1 square miles (88 km^{2}), of which, 34.1 square miles (88 km^{2}) of it is land and 0.1 square miles (0.26 km^{2}) of it (0.18%) is water.

=== Climate ===
According to the Köppen Climate Classification system, Arbon Valley has a semi-arid climate, abbreviated "BSk" on climate maps.

== Demographics ==
Historical population
Census	Pop.	Note	%±
2020	666		—
U.S. Decennial Census

As of the census of 2000, there were 627 people, 224 households, and 180 families residing in the CDP. The population density was 18.4 people per square mile (7.1 people/km^{2}). There were 241 housing units at an average density of 7.1 per square mile (2.7/km^{2}). The racial makeup of the CDP was 87.40% White, 0.16% African American, 4.63% Native American, 0.80% Asian, 4.78% from other races, and 2.23% from two or more races. Hispanic or Latino of any race were 10.37% of the population.

There were 224 households, out of which 37.9% had children under the age of 18 living with them, 68.8% were married couples living together, 5.4% had a female householder with no husband present, and 19.6% were non-families. 15.6% of all households were made up of individuals, and 4.5% had someone living alone who was 65 years of age or older. The average household size was 2.79 and the average family size was 3.08.

In the CDP, the population was spread out, with 28.4% under the age of 18, 9.1% from 18 to 24, 25.5% from 25 to 44, 30.5% from 45 to 64, and 6.5% who were 65 years of age or older. The median age was 36 years. For every 100 females, there were 111.1 males. For every 100 females age 18 and over, there were 111.8 males.

The median income for a household in the CDP was $36,818, and the median income for a family was $39,500. Males had a median income of $31,484 versus $17,500 for females. The per capita income for the CDP was $13,646. About 8.0% of families and 13.5% of the population were below the poverty line, including 21.6% of those under age 18 and 10.8% of those age 65 or over.

== Education ==
It is in American Falls Joint School District 381.

== See also ==
- List of census-designated places in Idaho
