= Pauline, Idaho =

Unincorporated community in Power County, Idaho, United States

- Unincorporated community
- Location in Idaho Location in the United States
- Coordinates: 42°34′15″N 112°33′37″W
- Country: United States
- State: Idaho
- County: Power
- Elevation: 5,010 ft (1,530 m)
- Time zone: UTC-7 (Mountain (MST))
  - Summer (DST): UTC-6 (MDT)
- Area codes: 208, 986
- GNIS feature ID: 397013

Pauline is an unincorporated community in Power County, Idaho, United States. Pauline is 21 miles (34 km) south-southwest of Pocatello.

== History ==
Pauline's population was 184 in 1925.
