= Arbon, Idaho =

Unincorporated community in Power County, Idaho, United States

- Unincorporated community
- Location in Idaho Location in the United States
- Coordinates: 42°27′21″N 112°34′06″W
- Country: United States
- State: Idaho
- County: Power
- Elevation: 5,177 ft (1,578 m)
- Time zone: UTC-7 (Mountain (MST))
  - Summer (DST): UTC-6 (MDT)
- ZIP code: 83212
- Area codes: 208, 986
- GNIS feature ID: 397384

Arbon is an unincorporated community in Power County, Idaho, United States.

== Description ==
The community is 25 miles (40 km) northwest of Malad City. Arbon has a post office with ZIP code 83212.

The first settlement at Arbon was made in 1893. The community has the name of George Arbon, a pioneer settler.

The first Arbon school was a 20 feet (6.1 m) by 36 feet (11 m) log cabin built in section 12 of Township 11 South, Range 33, East Boise Meridian, on land donated by Lorenzo Bailey. The schoolhouse also functioned as a church and a place for community events. Classes commenced on October 13, 1902.

== Demographics ==
Arbon's population was 100 in 1909, 340 in 1925, 55 in 1940, and 10 in 1960.

=== Climate ===
According to the Köppen Climate Classification system, Arbon has a semi-arid climate, abbreviated "BSk" on climate maps.
