= Rockland, Idaho =

- City
- Location of Rockland in Power County, Idaho.
- Coordinates: 42°34′24″N 112°52′35″W
- Country: United States
- State: Idaho
- County: Power

Area
  - Total: 0.28 sq mi (0.73 km^{2})
  - Land: 0.28 sq mi (0.73 km^{2})
  - Water: 0 sq mi (0.00 km^{2})
- Elevation: 4,649 ft (1,417 m)

Population (2020)
  - Total: 242
  - Density: 1,009.4/sq mi (389.73/km^{2})
- Time zone: UTC-7 (Mountain (MST))
  - Summer (DST): UTC-6 (MDT)
- ZIP code: 83271
- Area codes: 208, 986
- FIPS code: 16-69130
- GNIS feature ID: 2410979
- Website: rocklandcity.us

Rockland is a city in Power County, Idaho, United States. As of the 2020 census, Rockland had a population of 242.

== History ==
Rockland claims its founding in 1879, 11 years before Idaho achieved its statehood in 1890. The Rockland Valley was traveled by trappers before its founding, but its first permanent settlers entered the valley in 1878. At that time, Hidalgo Guadelupe Valdez herded his cattle into the valley and chose the valley as his home. In efforts to establish his home he dug a ditch from the East Fork Creek as means to irrigate his 30 acres of land. Thus, he was granted his "Water Right" on Feb. 15, 1879. Not only was he the first settler in the valley, but also the first irrigated farmer in the valley.

== Geography ==
Rockland is named after Rock Creek which flows north west into the Snake River.

According to the United States Census Bureau, the city has a total area of 0.30 square miles (0.78 km^{2}), all of it land.

== Demographics ==
Historical population
Census	Pop.	Note	%±
1920	344		—
1930	374		8.7%
1940	277		−25.9%
1950	277		0.0%
1960	256		−7.6%
1970	209		−18.4%
1980	283		35.4%
1990	264		−6.7%
2000	316		19.7%
2010	295		−6.6%
2020	242		−18.0%
2019 (est.)	283		−4.1%
U.S. Decennial Census

=== 2010 census ===
As of the census of 2010, there were 295 people, 97 households, and 76 families residing in the city. The population density was 983.3 inhabitants per square mile (379.7/km^{2}). There were 114 housing units at an average density of 380.0 per square mile (146.7/km^{2}). The racial makeup of the city was 99.7% White and 0.3% from two or more races. Hispanic or Latino of any race were 1.7% of the population.

There were 97 households, of which 28.9% had children under the age of 18 living with them, 69.1% were married couples living together, 6.2% had a female householder with no husband present, 3.1% had a male householder with no wife present, and 21.6% were non-families. 17.5% of all households were made up of individuals, and 5.2% had someone living alone who was 65 years of age or older. The average household size was 3.04 and the average family size was 3.43.

The median age in the city was 34.9 years. 32.9% of residents were under the age of 18; 6.7% were between the ages of 18 and 24; 21% were from 25 to 44; 23.2% were from 45 to 64; and 16.3% were 65 years of age or older. The gender makeup of the city was 49.5% male and 50.5% female.

=== 2000 census ===
As of the census of 2000, there were 316 people, 100 households, and 80 families residing in the city. The population density was 1,074.9 inhabitants per square mile (415.0/km^{2}). There were 117 housing units at an average density of 398.0 per square mile (153.7/km^{2}). The racial makeup of the city was 96.52% White, 0.63% Pacific Islander, 1.90% from other races, and 0.95% from two or more races. Hispanic or Latino of any race were 3.80% of the population.

There were 100 households, out of which 45.0% had children under the age of 18 living with them, 72.0% were married couples living together, 6.0% had a female householder with no husband present, and 20.0% were non-families. 19.0% of all households were made up of individuals, and 11.0% had someone living alone who was 65 years of age or older. The average household size was 3.16 and the average family size was 3.65.

In the city, the population was spread out, with 39.6% under the age of 18, 6.3% from 18 to 24, 19.0% from 25 to 44, 23.7% from 45 to 64, and 11.4% who were 65 years of age or older. The median age was 28 years. For every 100 females, there were 92.7 males. For every 100 females age 18 and over, there were 103.2 males.

The median income for a household in the city was $30,625, and the median income for a family was $42,778. Males had a median income of $38,125 versus $19,038 for females. The per capita income for the city was $14,554. About 14.3% of families and 15.5% of the population were below the poverty line, including 19.3% of those under age 18 and 6.5% of those age 65 or over.

== See also ==
- List of cities in Idaho
