= American Falls Dam =

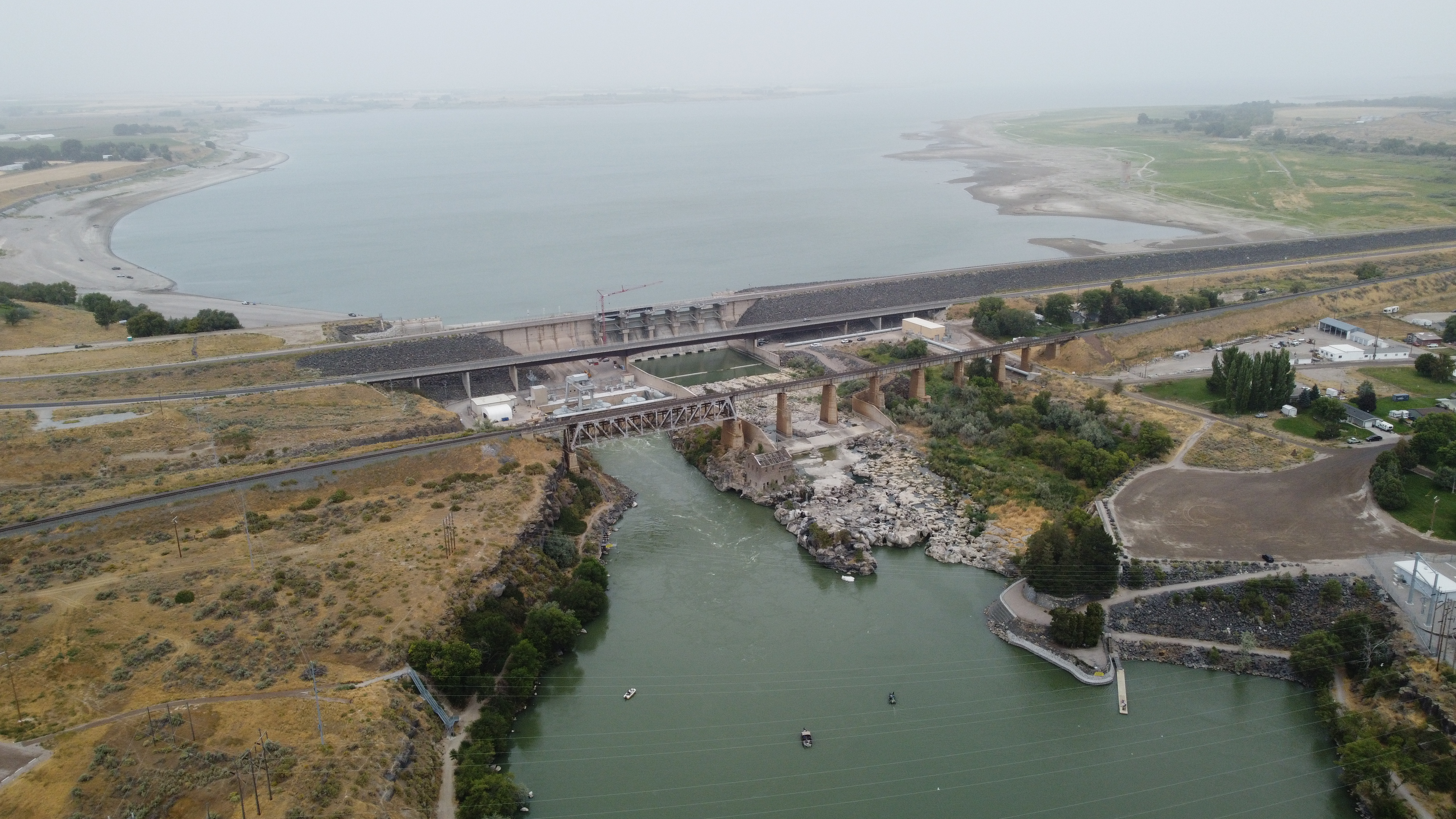
- Aerial view of the dam

- Location in the United States Location in Idaho
- Official name: American Falls Dam
- Location: Power County, Idaho, U.S.
- Coordinates: 42°46′51″N 112°52′32″W
- Construction began: 1976, 1925
- Opening date: 1978, 1927
- Operator: United States Bureau of Reclamation

Dam and spillways
- Impounds: Snake River
- Height: 94 ft (29 m)
- Length: 5,277 ft (1,608 m)
- Width (base): 42.5 ft (13.0 m)

Reservoir
- Creates: American Falls Reservoir
- Total capacity: 1,671,300 acre⋅ft (2.0615 km^{3})
- Normal elevation: 4,354 ft (1,327 m) AMSL

Power Station
- Operator: Idaho Power Company
- Turbines: 3
- Installed capacity: 112 MW

The American Falls Dam is a concrete gravity-type dam in the western United States, located near American Falls, Idaho, on river mile 714.7 of the Snake River. The dam and reservoir are a part of the Minidoka Project on the Snake River Plain and are used primarily for flood control, irrigation, and recreation. When the original dam was built in the 1920s by the U.S. Bureau of Reclamation, the residents of American Falls were forced to relocate three-quarters of their town to make room for the reservoir.

A second dam was completed in 1978 and the original structure was demolished. Although the dam itself is located in Power County, its reservoir also stretches northeastward into both Bingham County and Bannock County.

== Geology ==
A lava dam created a broad shallow lake in the area of the Raft River during the late Pliocene, over one million years ago. Much of the basin filled with fine sand, silt, and gravel; then the dam was breached and the lake drained. These sediments (called the Raft Formation) lie beneath most of the present-day American Falls Reservoir. At other times the Snake River was dammed completely by basalt flows extruded from vents. One lava dam a few miles downstream from the present American Falls Dam formed a reservoir in which more than 80 feet (24 m) of sediments (clay, silt, and sand) were deposited. This series of basalt flows and original sediments were covered by the new lake bed sediments and are named the Snake River Group and the American Falls Lake Beds. These events occurred up until the late Pleistocene, less than one million years ago. The Snake River has continued to erode its channel in the basalt and modify the lake bed sediments until the present time.

== Geography ==
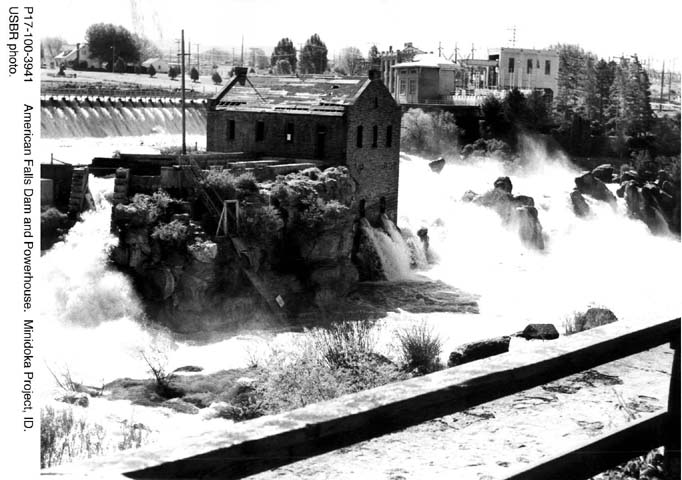
American Falls (circa 1902)

The dam at American Falls is on the Snake River Plain at an elevation of 4,357 feet (1,328 m) above sea level. The topography near the river is gently rolling, with differences in elevation of less than two hundred feet (60 m). The original falls occur where the river channel narrows to about 600 feet (180 m) and cascades about fifty feet (15 m) in several 6-to-10-foot (2 to 3 m) drops over highly jointed basalt. The final drop is a plunge of about fifteen feet (4.6 m).

== History ==
=== 1880–1925 ===
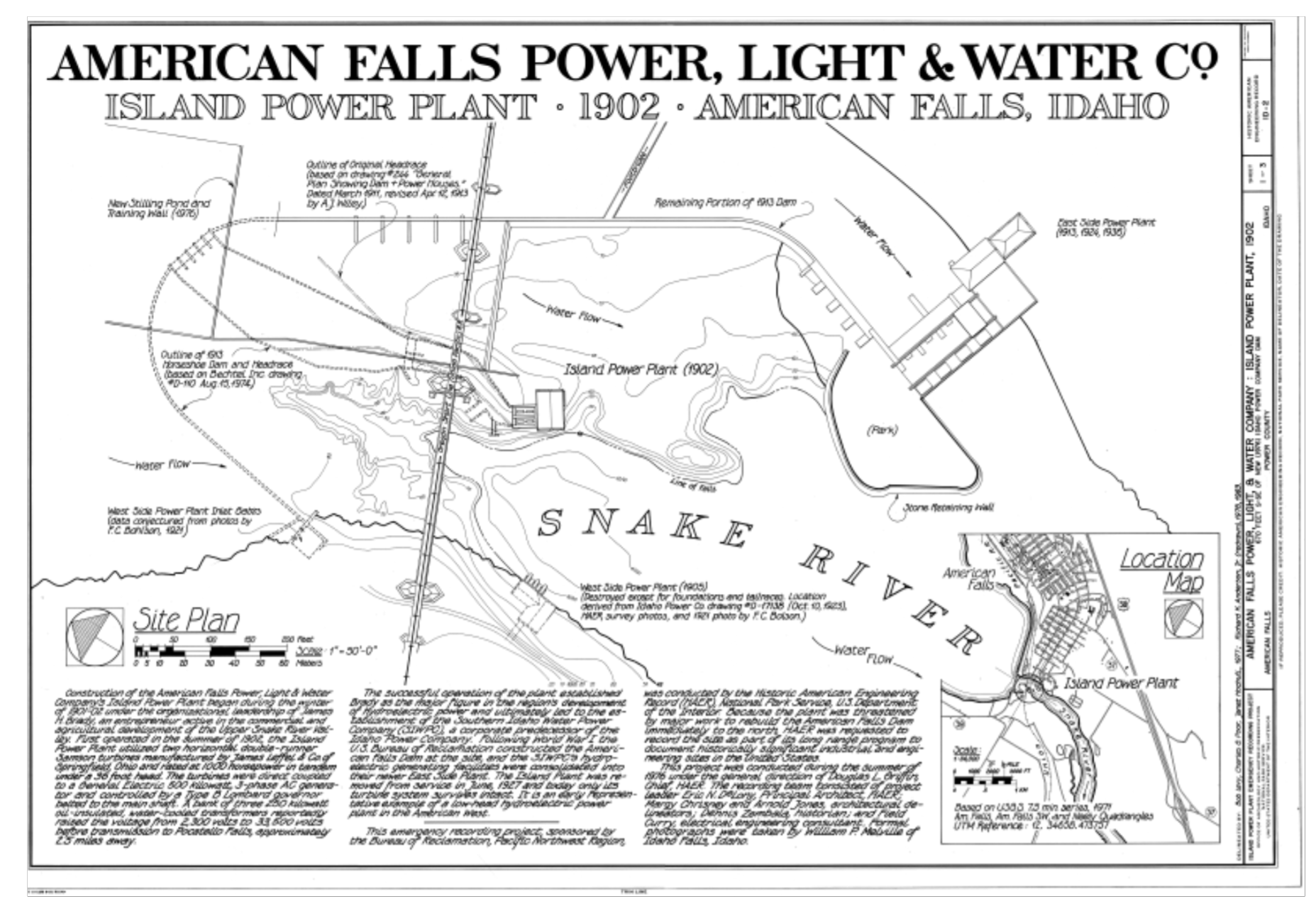
Plans for Power House on American Falls (1902)

The city of American Falls was first platted in the early 1880s. It was named for the waterfall on the Snake River near the settlement. During the last part of the 19th century, privately financed irrigation canals were created to sustain the emerging agriculture industry in southern Idaho and other parts of the west. The Carey act (1894) paved the way for private investment in irrigation projects. By 1895, the American Falls irrigation project came before the Idaho State Land Board. In 1902 the National Reclamation Act was signed into law and federal funds from the sale of public lands became available to create and maintain irrigation projects in the Western United States. The first power plant was built in 1902 on the falls and was acquired by the Idaho Power Company in 1916.

Damming the rivers became the preferred method for harnessing the abundant water of the western rivers. The reservoirs could then provide year-round downstream irrigation via canals, even during traditional low water times.

The use of eminent domain by the government to appropriate the original townsite in 1923 resulted in several lawsuits. One in particular, BROWN v. U S, 263 U.S. 78 (1923) allowed that the property valuation should include the value of the streets and improvements which would need to be replaced in the substitute site.

=== 1925–1960 ===
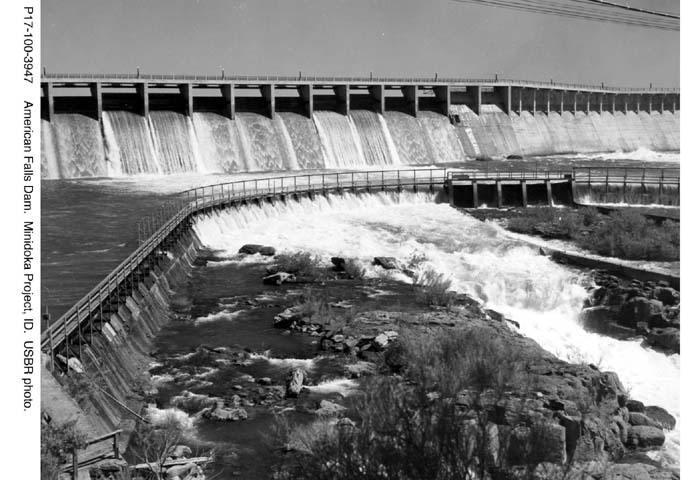
American Falls Dam (1947)

The first dam at American Falls was begun in 1925 by the Bureau of Reclamation and was completed in 1927. The river was temporarily impounded while the new concrete structure was put in place. The Oregon Short Line Railroad bridge over the river had to be raised to allow for crossing the new reservoir. This dam was designed by Frank A. Banks.

=== 1960–1978 ===
The existing dam is the second structure to be called the American Falls Dam. Core samples taken in the early 1960s of the concrete of the original structure revealed deterioration resulting in impaired durability and strength caused by a chemical reaction between components of the concrete. The solution was to replace the original dam with a second dam built downstream in 1978. Replacement of the original dam was authorized by a congressional act of December 28, 1973 (87 Stat. 904, Public Law 93-206). In 1976, the Idaho Power Company built the dam's current power plant which consists of three generators with a capacity to produce 112,420 kilowatts (112 MW) of hydroelectricity.

In 1976, the upstream Teton Dam failed during filling, causing spring snowmelt to race downstream into the Teton River, a tributary of the Snake, demolishing several towns along its path. In an attempt to contain this flood, water was released from American Falls Dam as quickly as possible. If the dam were to fail, the other Snake River dams would experience a flood they were not designed to cope with, although the lower Columbia River dams would most likely survive. The American Falls reservoir filled, but its level did not even rise to its spillway crest.

When the second dam was planned, members of the Shoshone and Bannock communities opposed expansion as it would further flood the lands of the Fort Hall Bottoms. Native Americans have inhabited this region for at least 10,000 years and the area is an important resource for them. Many scientists were opposed as well because of the loss of natural habitat and access to fossil records of the Bottoms.

== See also ==
- List of dams in the Columbia River watershed
