= Power County, Idaho =

County in Idaho, United States

- County
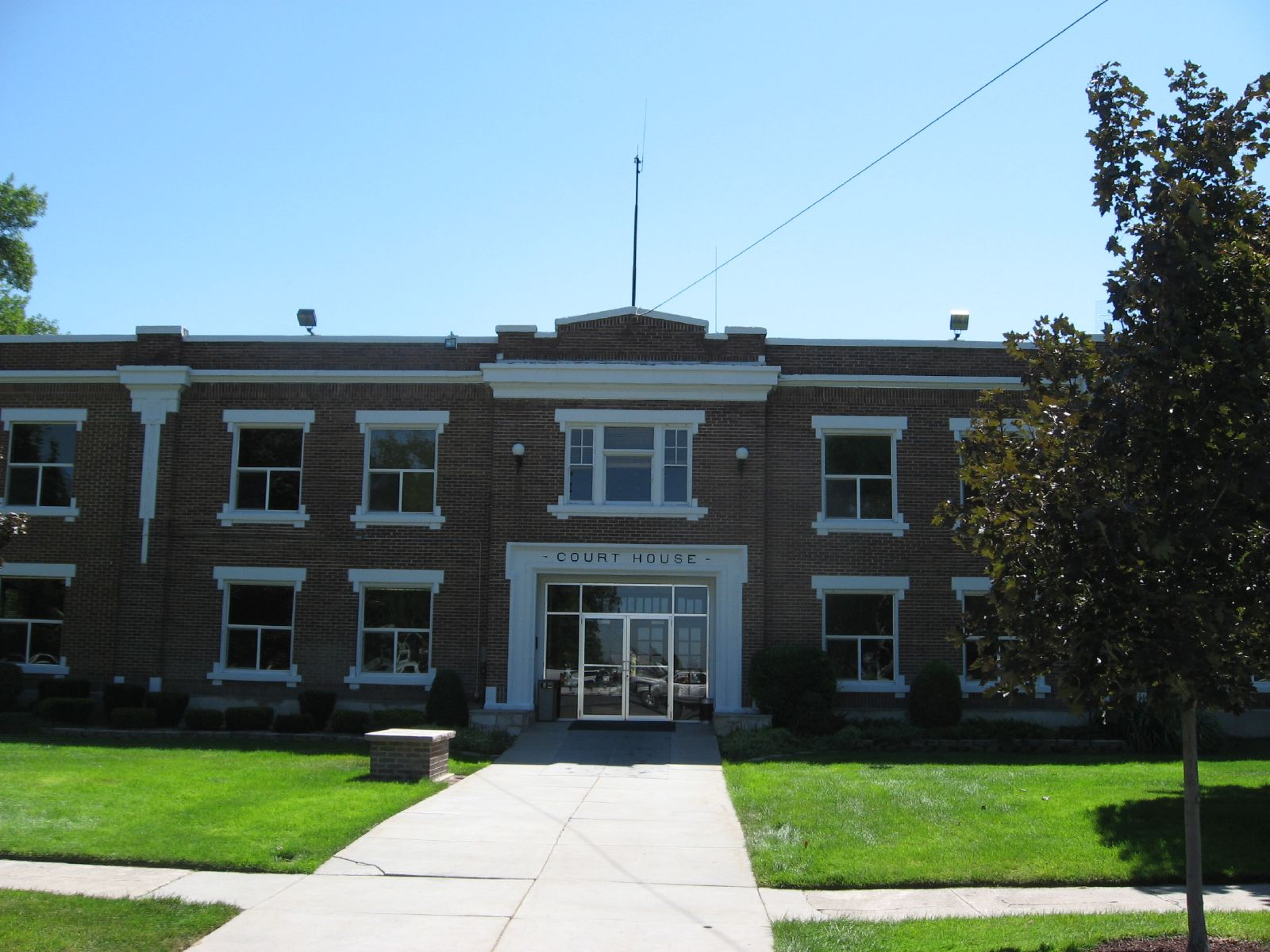
- Power County Courthouse, American Falls

- Seal

- Location within the U.S. state of Idaho
- Coordinates: 42°41′N 112°50′W
- Country: United States
- State: Idaho
- Founded: January 30, 1913
- Named for: power plant at the American Falls Dam
- Seat: American Falls
- Largest city: American Falls

Area
  - Total: 1,443 sq mi (3,740 km^{2})
  - Land: 1,404 sq mi (3,640 km^{2})
  - Water: 38 sq mi (98 km^{2}) 2.7%

Population (2020)
  - Total: 7,878
  - Estimate (2025): 8,246 ▲
  - Density: 5.611/sq mi (2.166/km^{2})
- Time zone: UTC−7 (Mountain)
  - Summer (DST): UTC−6 (MDT)
- Congressional district: 2nd
- Website: www.powercounty.gov

Power County is a county located in the U.S. state of Idaho. As of the 2020 census, the county had a population of 7,878. The county seat and largest city is American Falls. The county was created by the Idaho Legislature on January 30, 1913, by a partition of Cassia County. It is named for an early hydroelectric power plant (1902) at the American Falls.

== Geography ==
According to the U.S. Census Bureau, the county has a total area of 1,443 square miles (3,740 km^{2}), of which 1,404 square miles (3,640 km^{2}) is land and 38 square miles (98 km^{2}) (2.7%) is water.

=== Adjacent counties ===
- Bannock County – east
- Oneida County – south
- Bingham County – north
- Blaine County – northwest
- Cassia County – southwest

=== Major highways ===
- Interstate 86
- US 30
- SH-37
- SH-39

=== National protected areas ===
- Caribou National Forest (part)
- Craters of the Moon National Monument and Preserve (part)
- Curlew National Grassland (part)
- Minidoka National Wildlife Refuge (part)
- Sawtooth National Forest (part)

== Government ==
Power County, like Idaho in general, is highly conservative and supports Republican presidential candidates by large margins. The last Democrat to win the county was Lyndon Johnson in 1964.

Power County's commissioners are:

- Ronald Funk (chairman, District 1)
- William Lasley (District 2)
- Delane Anderson (District 3)

United States presidential election results for Power County, Idaho
Year	Republican		Democratic		Third party(ies)	
Year	No.	%	No.	%	No.	%
1916	1,024	47.41%	1,079	49.95%	57	2.64%
1920	1,155	67.31%	561	32.69%	0	0.00%
1924	757	43.13%	314	17.89%	684	38.97%
1928	852	56.50%	653	43.30%	3	0.20%
1932	603	34.74%	1,126	64.86%	7	0.40%
1936	708	39.07%	1,075	59.33%	29	1.60%
1940	951	50.45%	931	49.39%	3	0.16%
1944	895	52.77%	801	47.23%	0	0.00%
1948	875	52.05%	795	47.29%	11	0.65%
1952	1,308	68.45%	603	31.55%	0	0.00%
1956	1,108	59.03%	769	40.97%	0	0.00%
1960	1,065	52.59%	960	47.41%	0	0.00%
1964	966	45.42%	1,161	54.58%	0	0.00%
1968	1,222	60.26%	582	28.70%	224	11.05%
1972	1,405	64.45%	625	28.67%	150	6.88%
1976	1,374	49.96%	1,286	46.76%	90	3.27%
1980	2,235	71.11%	727	23.13%	181	5.76%
1984	2,298	76.50%	678	22.57%	28	0.93%
1988	1,838	61.66%	1,095	36.73%	48	1.61%
1992	1,352	45.41%	837	28.12%	788	26.47%
1996	1,501	51.12%	1,070	36.44%	365	12.43%
2000	1,872	69.10%	755	27.87%	82	3.03%
2004	2,105	71.16%	829	28.03%	24	0.81%
2008	1,754	61.72%	1,027	36.14%	61	2.15%
2012	1,870	64.39%	982	33.82%	52	1.79%
2016	1,666	60.41%	699	25.34%	393	14.25%
2020	2,116	68.57%	865	28.03%	105	3.40%
2024	2,146	71.04%	785	25.98%	90	2.98%

== Demographics ==
Historical population
Census	Pop.	Note	%±
1920	5,105		—
1930	4,457		−12.7%
1940	3,965		−11.0%
1950	3,988		0.6%
1960	4,111		3.1%
1970	4,864		18.3%
1980	6,844		40.7%
1990	7,086		3.5%
2000	7,538		6.4%
2010	7,817		3.7%
2020	7,878		0.8%
2025 (est.)	8,246	▲	4.7%
U.S. Decennial Census; 1790–1960, 1900–1990, 1990–2000, 2010, 2020

=== Racial and ethnic composition ===
Power County, Idaho – Racial and ethnic composition Note: the US Census treats Hispanic/Latino as an ethnic category. This table excludes Latinos from the racial categories and assigns them to a separate category. Hispanics/Latinos may be of any race.
Race / Ethnicity (NH = Non-Hispanic)	Pop 1980	Pop 1990	Pop 2000	Pop 2010	Pop 2020	% 1980	% 1990	% 2000	% 2010	% 2020
White alone (NH)	6,086	5,908	5,592	5,164	4,826	88.92%	83.38%	74.18%	66.06%	61.26%
Black or African American alone (NH)	1	6	5	18	17	0.01%	0.08%	0.07%	0.23%	0.22%
Native American or Alaska Native alone (NH)	224	198	225	161	172	3.27%	2.79%	2.98%	2.06%	2.18%
Asian alone (NH)	20	33	24	32	18	0.29%	0.47%	0.32%	0.41%	0.23%
Native Hawaiian or Pacific Islander alone (NH)	x	x	3	6	8	x	x	0.04%	0.08%	0.10%
Other race alone (NH)	7	4	6	2	22	0.10%	0.06%	0.08%	0.03%	0.28%
Mixed race or Multiracial (NH)	x	x	45	106	191	x	x	0.60%	1.36%	2.42%
Hispanic or Latino (any race)	506	937	1,638	2,328	2,624	7.39%	13.22%	21.73%	29.78%	33.31%
Total	6,844	7,086	7,538	7,817	7,878	100.00%	100.00%	100.00%	100.00%	100.00%

=== 2020 census ===
As of the 2020 census, the county had a population of 7,878. The median age was 35.3 years, with 30.2% of residents under the age of 18 and 16.3% aged 65 or older. For every 100 females there were 101.9 males, and for every 100 females age 18 and over there were 104.1 males age 18 and over.

The racial makeup of the county was 65.8% White, 0.3% Black or African American, 2.8% American Indian and Alaska Native, 0.2% Asian, 0.1% Native Hawaiian and Pacific Islander, 21.8% from some other race, and 9.0% from two or more races. Hispanic or Latino residents of any race comprised 33.3% of the population.

0.0% of residents lived in urban areas, while 100.0% lived in rural areas.

There were 2,689 households in the county, of which 38.7% had children under the age of 18 living with them and 18.8% had a female householder with no spouse or partner present. About 20.9% of all households were made up of individuals and 9.9% had someone living alone who was 65 years of age or older.

There were 2,937 housing units, of which 8.4% were vacant. Among occupied housing units, 73.9% were owner-occupied and 26.1% were renter-occupied. The homeowner vacancy rate was 1.7% and the rental vacancy rate was 5.9%.

=== 2010 census ===
As of the 2010 United States census, there were 7,817 people, 2,641 households, and 2,019 families living in the county. The population density was 5.6 inhabitants per square mile (2.2/km^{2}). There were 2,944 housing units at an average density of 2.1 units per square mile (0.81 units/km^{2}). The racial makeup of the county was 75.1% white, 2.3% American Indian, 0.4% Asian, 0.3% black or African American, 0.1% Pacific islander, 19.5% from other races, and 2.4% from two or more races. Those of Hispanic or Latino origin made up 29.8% of the population. In terms of ancestry, 16.7% were German, 16.7% were English, and 7.2% were American.

Of the 2,641 households, 40.7% had children under the age of 18 living with them, 60.6% were married couples living together, 10.1% had a female householder with no husband present, 23.6% were non-families, and 19.8% of all households were made up of individuals. The average household size was 2.94 and the average family size was 3.39. The median age was 33.2 years.

The median income for a household in the county was $40,843 and the median income for a family was $46,391. Males had a median income of $35,674 versus $29,844 for females. The per capita income for the county was $18,412. About 8.3% of families and 11.1% of the population were below the poverty line, including 13.7% of those under age 18 and 12.3% of those age 65 or over.

=== 2000 census ===
As of the census of 2000, there were 7,538 people, 2,560 households, and 1,968 families living in the county. The population density was 5 people per square mile (1.9 people/km^{2}). There were 2,844 housing units at an average density of 2 units per square mile (0.77 units/km^{2}). The racial makeup of the county was 83.78% White, 0.09% Black or African American, 3.29% Native American, 0.32% Asian, 0.04% Pacific Islander, 11.10% from other races, and 1.38% from two or more races. 21.73% of the population were Hispanic or Latino of any race. 18.0% were of German, 17.6% English and 10.9% American ancestry.

There were 2,560 households, out of which 40.90% had children under the age of 18 living with them, 63.40% were married couples living together, 8.80% had a female householder with no husband present, and 23.10% were non-families. 20.30% of all households were made up of individuals, and 8.80% had someone living alone who was 65 years of age or older. The average household size was 2.92 and the average family size was 3.38.

In the county, the population was spread out, with 33.80% under the age of 18, 8.40% from 18 to 24, 25.40% from 25 to 44, 22.00% from 45 to 64, and 10.40% who were 65 years of age or older. The median age was 32 years. For every 100 females, there were 101.00 males. For every 100 females age 18 and over, there were 99.90 males.

The median income for a household in the county was $32,226, and the median income for a family was $36,685. Males had a median income of $29,676 versus $20,930 for females. The per capita income for the county was $14,007. About 10.80% of families and 16.10% of the population were below the poverty line, including 20.10% of those under age 18 and 12.70% of those age 65 or over.

== Communities ==
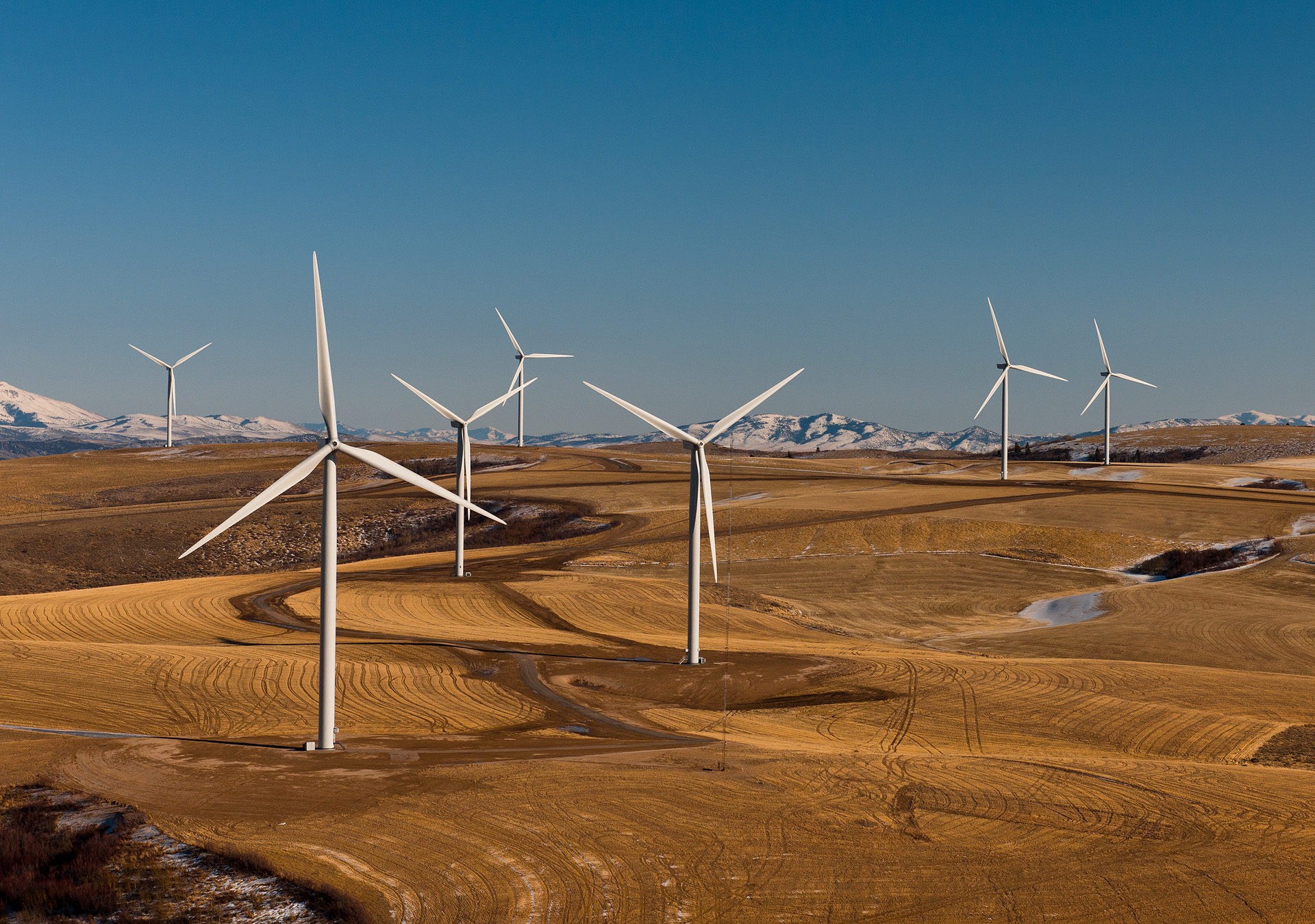
An aerial view of the Power County wind farm in Power County

=== Cities ===
- American Falls
- Pocatello (partly)
- Rockland

=== Census-designated place ===
- Arbon Valley

=== Unincorporated communities ===
- Arbon
- Neeley
- Pauline
- Roy

== Education ==
School districts include:

- American Falls Joint School District 381
- Arbon Elementary School District 383
- Rockland School District 382

== See also ==
- National Register of Historic Places listings in Power County, Idaho
