= American Falls, Idaho =

City in Idaho, United States

- City
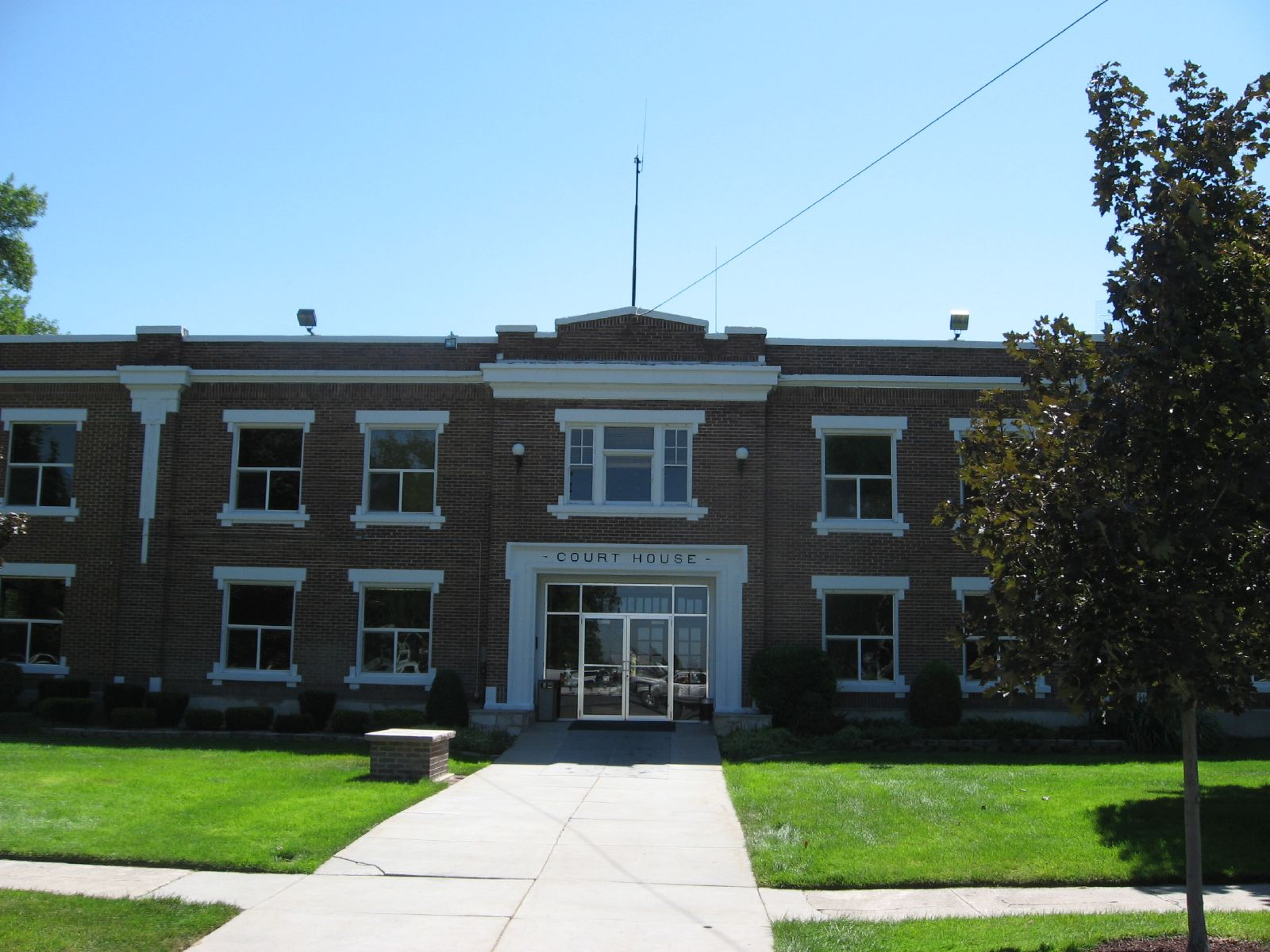
- Power County Courthouse (2007)

- Location of American Falls in Power County, Idaho.
- Coordinates: 42°46′58″N 112°51′15″W
- Country: United States
- State: Idaho
- County: Power

Area
  - Total: 1.61 sq mi (4.18 km^{2})
  - Land: 1.61 sq mi (4.18 km^{2})
  - Water: 0 sq mi (0.00 km^{2})
- Elevation: 4,410 ft (1,340 m)

Population (2020)
  - Total: 4,568
  - Density: 2,674.1/sq mi (1,032.46/km^{2})
- Time zone: UTC−7 (Mountain (MST))
  - Summer (DST): UTC−6 (MDT)
- ZIP code: 83211
- Area codes: 208, 986
- FIPS code: 16-01900
- GNIS feature ID: 2409696
- Website: cityofamericanfalls.com

American Falls is a city in and the county seat of Power County, Idaho, United States. The population was 4,568 at the time of the 2020 census.

== History ==
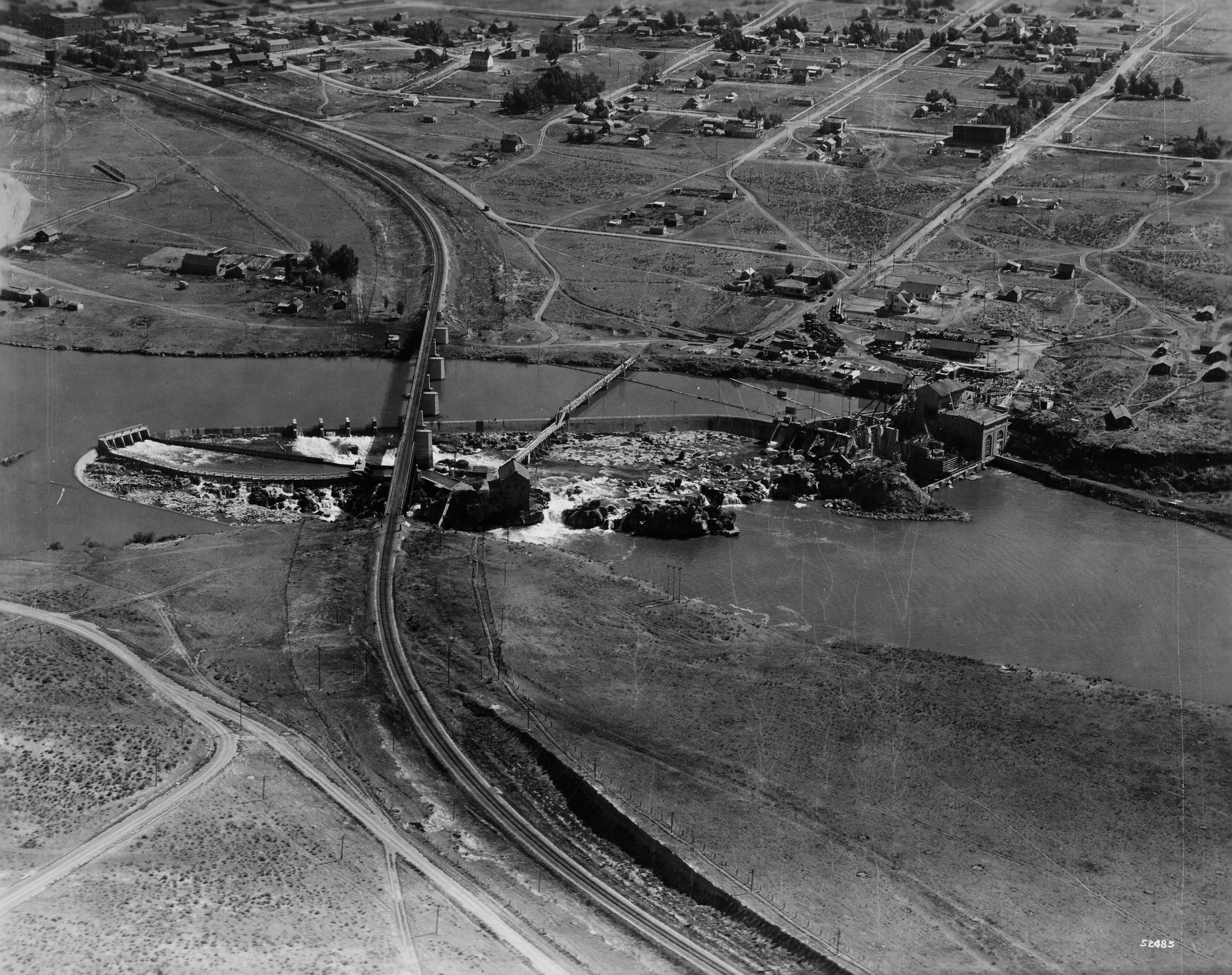
Looking southeast across American Falls, Snake River, 1923

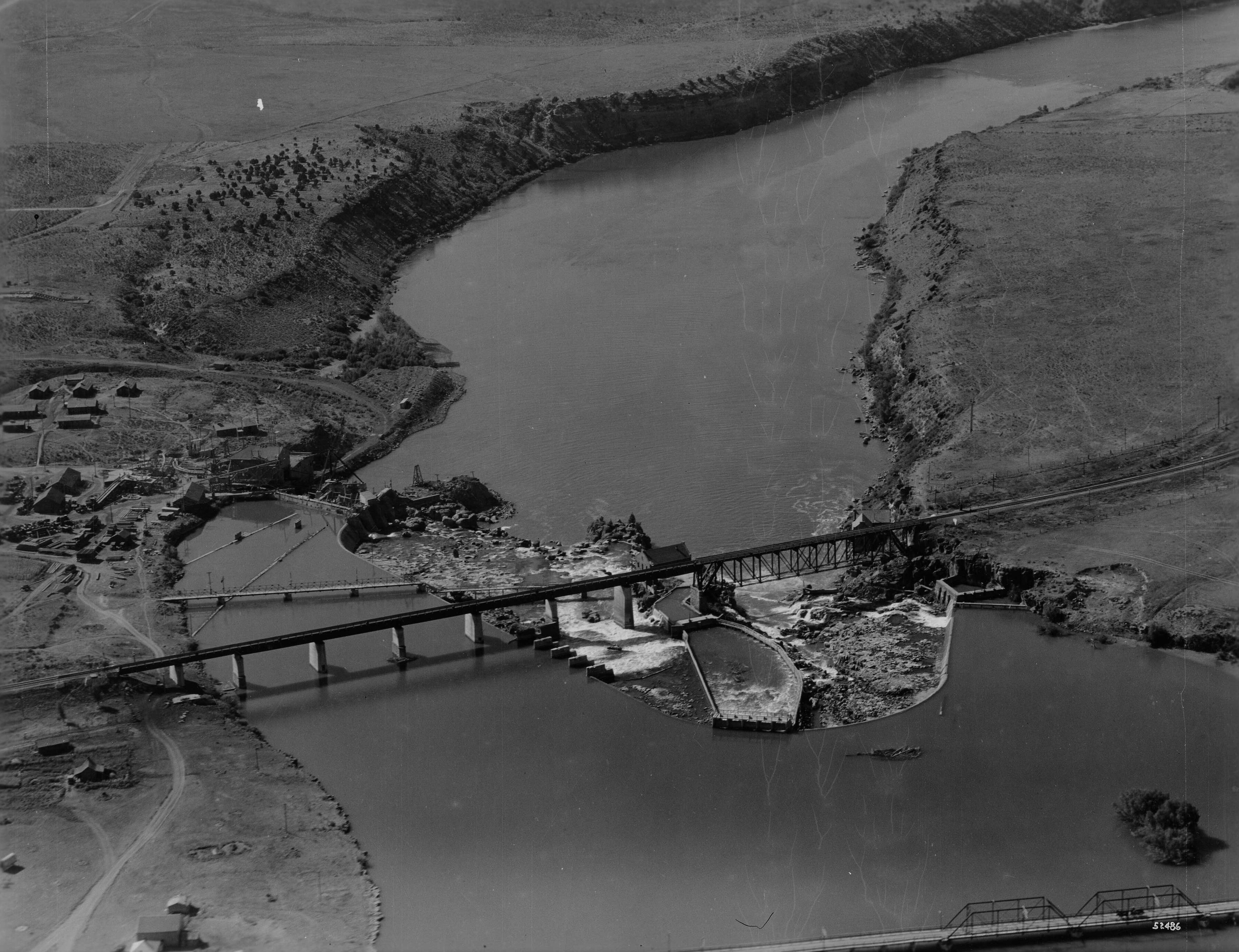
Looking downstream, American Falls, Snake River, 1923

American Falls was a landmark waterfall on the Snake River, named after a party of American trappers whose boat went over the falls. The Wilson Price Hunt expedition in 1811 camped at the falls one night and the expedition of John C. Frémont was here in 1843. The Oregon Trail passed north of town, through the present-day reservoir. Power plants first sprang up at the falls in 1901. American Falls was the first town in the U.S. to be entirely relocated. It was moved in 1925 to facilitate construction of the nearby American Falls Dam. The old townsite sits at the bottom of the reservoir, northwest of the present city. A larger dam was completed in 1978, downstream from the deteriorating 1927 structure, which was later demolished.

== Geography ==
According to the United States Census Bureau, the city has a total area of 1.69 square miles (4.38 km^{2}), all of it land.

=== Climate ===
American Falls has a semi-arid climate (Köppen BSk).

Climate data for American Falls, Idaho, 1991–2020 normals, extremes 2008–present
Month	Jan	Feb	Mar	Apr	May	Jun	Jul	Aug	Sep	Oct	Nov	Dec	Year
Record high °F (°C)	58 (14)	63 (17)	75 (24)	88 (31)	90 (32)	101 (38)	103 (39)	103 (39)	97 (36)	89 (32)	70 (21)	59 (15)	103 (39)
Mean daily maximum °F (°C)	34.5 (1.4)	39.1 (3.9)	51.8 (11.0)	60.0 (15.6)	71.3 (21.8)	79.1 (26.2)	90.4 (32.4)	87.7 (30.9)	76.9 (24.9)	61.4 (16.3)	46.5 (8.1)	34.5 (1.4)	61.1 (16.2)
Daily mean °F (°C)	26.6 (−3.0)	30.0 (−1.1)	40.5 (4.7)	47.5 (8.6)	56.9 (13.8)	64.4 (18.0)	73.4 (23.0)	71.2 (21.8)	61.5 (16.4)	48.8 (9.3)	36.6 (2.6)	27.2 (−2.7)	48.7 (9.3)
Mean daily minimum °F (°C)	18.7 (−7.4)	21.0 (−6.1)	29.1 (−1.6)	35.0 (1.7)	42.5 (5.8)	49.6 (9.8)	56.4 (13.6)	54.8 (12.7)	46.2 (7.9)	36.2 (2.3)	26.8 (−2.9)	20.0 (−6.7)	36.4 (2.4)
Record low °F (°C)	−22 (−30)	−10 (−23)	1 (−17)	16 (−9)	25 (−4)	32 (0)	42 (6)	38 (3)	28 (−2)	3 (−16)	−3 (−19)	−14 (−26)	−22 (−30)
Average precipitation inches (mm)	0.96 (24)	0.68 (17)	1.02 (26)	1.30 (33)	1.54 (39)	1.15 (29)	0.53 (13)	0.49 (12)	0.81 (21)	0.92 (23)	0.83 (21)	0.87 (22)	11.10 (282)
Average snowfall inches (cm)	8.3 (21)	6.7 (17)	3.2 (8.1)	1.7 (4.3)	0.5 (1.3)	0.0 (0.0)	0.0 (0.0)	0.0 (0.0)	0.1 (0.25)	0.9 (2.3)	2.9 (7.4)	7.7 (20)	32.0 (81)
Average precipitation days (≥ 0.01 in)	7.6	6.5	9.1	9.2	8.4	5.1	2.5	3.2	4.5	5.9	6.4	9.0	77.4
Average snowy days (≥ 0.1 in)	6.7	4.4	2.4	1.1	0.2	0.0	0.0	0.0	0.0	0.7	2.9	5.9	24.3
Source 1: NOAA (snow/snow days 1981–2010)
Source 2: National Weather Service

== Demographics ==
Historical population
Census	Pop.	Note	%±
1910	953		—
1920	1,547		62.3%
1930	1,280		−17.3%
1940	1,439		12.4%
1950	1,874		30.2%
1960	2,123		13.3%
1970	2,769		30.4%
1980	3,626		30.9%
1990	3,757		3.6%
2000	4,111		9.4%
2010	4,457		8.4%
2020	4,568		2.5%
U.S. Decennial Census

=== 2020 census ===
As of the 2020 census, American Falls had a population of 4,568. The median age was 32.0 years. 32.6% of residents were under the age of 18 and 14.5% of residents were 65 years of age or older. For every 100 females there were 98.3 males, and for every 100 females age 18 and over there were 98.6 males age 18 and over.

0.0% of residents lived in urban areas, while 100.0% lived in rural areas.

There were 1,519 households in American Falls, of which 41.5% had children under the age of 18 living in them. Of all households, 53.1% were married-couple households, 17.7% were households with a male householder and no spouse or partner present, and 22.6% were households with a female householder and no spouse or partner present. About 23.1% of all households were made up of individuals and 10.4% had someone living alone who was 65 years of age or older.

There were 1,642 housing units, of which 7.5% were vacant. The homeowner vacancy rate was 1.9% and the rental vacancy rate was 8.0%.

Racial composition as of the 2020 census
Race	Number	Percent
White	2,578	56.4%
Black or African American	14	0.3%
American Indian and Alaska Native	62	1.4%
Asian	13	0.3%
Native Hawaiian and Other Pacific Islander	4	0.1%
Some other race	1,432	31.3%
Two or more races	465	10.2%
Hispanic or Latino (of any race)	2,103	46.0%

=== 2010 census ===
As of the census of 2010, there were 4,457 people, 1,474 households, and 1,104 families living in the city. The population density was 2,637.3 inhabitants per square mile (1,018.3/km^{2}). There were 1,612 housing units at an average density of 953.8 per square mile (368.3/km^{2}). The racial makeup of the city was 70.2% White, 0.4% African American, 0.9% Native American, 0.5% Asian, 0.1% Pacific Islander, 25.1% from other races, and 2.8% from two or more races. Hispanic or Latino of any race were 39.0% of the population.

There were 1,474 households, of which 44.6% had children under the age of 18 living with them, 55.9% were married couples living together, 13.0% had a female householder with no husband present, 6.0% had a male householder with no wife present, and 25.1% were non-families. 21.6% of all households were made up of individuals, and 10.3% had someone living alone who was 65 years of age or older. The average household size was 3.00 and the average family size was 3.51.

The median age in the city was 30.2 years. 33.1% of residents were under the age of 18; 10.3% were between the ages of 18 and 24; 23.5% were from 25 to 44; 21.3% were from 45 to 64; and 11.9% were 65 years of age or older. The gender makeup of the city was 50.9% male and 49.1% female.

=== 2000 census ===
As of the census of 2000, there were 4,111 people, 1,429 households, and 1,063 families living in the city. The population density was 2,674.5 inhabitants per square mile (1,032.6/km^{2}). There were 1,557 housing units at an average density of 1,012.9 per square mile (391.1/km^{2}). The racial makeup of the city was 81.56% White, 0.15% African American, 1.00% Native American, 0.41% Asian, 0.02% Pacific Islander, 15.15% from other races, and 1.70% from two or more races. Hispanic or Latino of any race were 27.83% of the population.

There were 1,429 households, out of which 40.9% had children under the age of 18 living with them, 58.1% were married couples living together, 11.8% had a female householder with no husband present, and 25.6% were non-families. 22.6% of all households were made up of individuals, and 11.3% had someone living alone who was 65 years of age or older. The average household size was 2.84 and the average family size was 3.34.

In the city, the population was spread out, with 33.7% under the age of 18, 8.9% from 18 to 24, 24.8% from 25 to 44, 20.3% from 45 to 64, and 12.2% who were 65 years of age or older. The median age was 30 years. For every 100 females, there were 95.6 males. For every 100 females age 18 and over, there were 92.0 males.

The median income for a household in the city was $30,955, and the median income for a family was $35,435. Males had a median income of $27,317 versus $21,209 for females. The per capita income for the city was $12,891. About 12.7% of families and 17.3% of the population were below the poverty line, including 19.0% of those under age 18 and 16.3% of those age 65 or over.

== Education ==
American Falls High School is a secondary school in American Falls. In 2012, it was designated as a four star school.

In 2004, Randy Jensen, Principal of William Thomas Middle School in American Falls, was awarded the National Principal of Secondary Schools Award.

== Notable people ==
- Bob Barron, racing driver
- D. W. Davis, 12th governor of Idaho
- Boyd Grant, college basketball coach
- Steve Hayes, basketball player and coach
- María Sánchez, American-born Mexican footballer
- Marion Barton Skaggs, businessman
- Annalee Skarin, writer of Mormon literature

== See also ==
- List of cities in Idaho
