= List of places in Idaho: L–Z =

This list of current cities, towns, unincorporated communities, counties, and other recognized places in the U.S. state of Idaho also includes information on the number and names of counties in which the place lies, and its lower and upper ZIP Code bounds, if applicable.

== L ==
Name of place	Number of counties	Principal county	Lower ZIP Code	Upper ZIP Code
Labelle	1	Jefferson County	83442
Laclede	1	Bonner County	83841
La Fleur	1	Ada County
Lago	1	Caribou County	83241
Lake	1	Fremont County
Lake Creek	1	Kootenai County	83876
Lake Fork	1	Valley County	83635
Lakeview	1	Bonner County	83803
Lamb Creek	1	Bonner County
Lamont	1	Fremont County	83420
Lanark	1	Bear Lake County	83260
Lancaster Terrace	1	Ada County
Landmark	1	Valley County
Landore	1	Adams County
Lane	1	Kootenai County	83810
Lapwai	1	Nez Perce County	83540
Lardo	1	Valley County	83638
Larson	1	Shoshone County
Last Chance	1	Fremont County
Last Chance Resort	1	Fremont County	83429
Lava Hot Springs	1	Bannock County	83246
Lawman Ford	1	Valley County
Leadore	1	Lemhi County	83464
Leadville	1	Lemhi County
Leesburg	1	Lemhi County
Leland	1	Nez Perce County	83537
Lemhi	1	Lemhi County	83465
Lenore	1	Nez Perce County	83541
Leon	1	Nez Perce County
Leone	1	Ada County
Leonia	1	Boundary County
Leslie	1	Custer County	83255
Letha	1	Gem County	83636
Lewiston	1	Nez Perce County	83501
Lewiston-Nez Perce County Airport	1	Nez Perce County	83501
Lewiston Orchards	1	Nez Perce County	83501
Lewisville	1	Jefferson County	83431
Liberty	1	Bear Lake County	83260
Liberty	1	Bingham County
Lidy Hot Springs	1	Clark County	83423
Lifton	1	Bear Lake County
Lincoln	1	Bonneville County	83401
Lincoln Junction	1	Bonneville County
Linden	1	Latah County	83550
Linfor	1	Shoshone County
Linrose	1	Franklin County	83286
Little Rock	1	Gem County
Little Sugarloaf	1	Owyhee County
Lone Pine	1	Clark County	83464
Lone Rock	1	Power County
Lone Star	1	Lincoln County	83352
Lookout	1	Nez Perce County	83541
Lorenzo	1	Jefferson County	83442
Lost River	1	Butte County
Lost River	1	Custer County	83231
Lotus	1	Benewah County
Lowell	1	Idaho County	83539
Lower Stanley	1	Custer County	83278
Lowman	1	Boise County	83637
Lucile	1	Idaho County	83542
Lund	1	Caribou County	83217
Lyman	1	Madison County	83440

== M ==
Name of place	Number of counties	Principal county	Lower ZIP Code	Upper ZIP Code
McArthur	1	Boundary County	83847
McCall	1	Valley County	83638
McCammon	1	Bannock County	83250
McCarthy	1	Shoshone County	83873
McDonaldville	1	Bingham County
Mace	1	Shoshone County	83873
McGuire	1	Kootenai County	83854
McHenry	1	Jerome County
Mackay	1	Custer County	83251
Mackay Bar	1	Idaho County	83638
Macks Inn	1	Fremont County	83433
McMillan	1	Twin Falls County
Macon	1	Camas County
Maddens	1	Canyon County
Magic	1	Camas County
Magic City	1	Blaine County	83333
Magic Resort	1	Blaine County	83352
Malad	1	Oneida County
Malad City	1	Oneida County	83252
Malta	1	Cassia County	83342
Mangum	1	Canyon County
Manson	1	Bear Lake County
Mapleton	1	Franklin County	83263
Marble Creek	1	Shoshone County
Marion	1	Cassia County	83346
Mark	1	Madison County
Marsh Valley	1	Bannock County
Marsing	1	Owyhee County	83639
Martin	1	Butte County
Martin	1	Cassia County
Marysville	1	Fremont County	83420
Mashburn	1	Benewah County
Masonia	1	Shoshone County
Max	1	Minidoka County
May	1	Lemhi County	83253
Mayfield	1	Elmore County	83706
Meadow Creek	1	Boundary County	83805
Meadows	1	Adams County	83654
Medimont	1	Kootenai County	83842
Melba	1	Canyon County	83641
Melmont	1	Canyon County
Melrose	1	Nez Perce County
Menan	1	Jefferson County	83434
Meridian	1	Ada County	83642
Mesa	1	Adams County
Mesa	1	Adams County	83643
Meteor	1	Twin Falls County
Mica	1	Kootenai County
Michaud	1	Power County
Midas	1	Bonner County	83864
Midasville	1	Idaho County
Middleton	1	Canyon County	83644
Midnight	1	Valley County
Midvale	1	Washington County	83645
Midway	1	Bingham County
Midway	1	Canyon County
Midway	1	Jefferson County
Miller Creek Settlement	1	Owyhee County
Milner	1	Twin Falls County
Milo	1	Bonneville County	83427
Mineral	1	Washington County
Minidoka	1	Minidoka County	83343
Mink Creek	1	Franklin County	83263
Mitchell	1	Bingham County
Mohler	1	Lewis County	83523
Monsanto	1	Caribou County
Montana Junction	1	Bannock County	83201
Monteview	1	Jefferson County	83435
Montour	1	Gem County	83617
Montpelier	1	Bear Lake County	83254
Moody	1	Madison County
Moore	1	Butte County	83255
Moose City	1	Clearwater County
Mora	1	Ada County	83634
Moravia	1	Boundary County	83847
Moreland	1	Bingham County	83256
Morgan	1	Bingham County
Morgans Alley	1	Nez Perce County	83501
Morning	1	Shoshone County
Morrow	1	Lewis County
Morton	1	Bonner County
Moscow	1	Latah County	83843
Moss	1	Canyon County
Mound Valley	1	Franklin County
Mountain Home	1	Elmore County	83647
Mountain Home Air Force Base	1	Elmore County	83648
Mountain Home Base	1	Elmore County
Mountain View	1	Ada County	83704
Mount Idaho	1	Idaho County	83530
Mowry	1	Benewah County
Moyie Springs	1	Boundary County	83845
Mozart	1	Kootenai County
Mud Lake	1	Jefferson County	83450
Mud Springs	1	Idaho County
Muldoon	1	Blaine County	83320
Mullan	1	Shoshone County	83846
Murphy	1	Owyhee County	83650
Murphy Hot Springs	1	Owyhee County
Murray	1	Shoshone County	83874
Murtaugh	1	Twin Falls County	83344
Musselshell	1	Clearwater County
Myers	1	Minidoka County
Myrtle	1	Nez Perce County	83535

== N ==
Name of place	Number of counties	Principal county	Lower ZIP Code	Upper ZIP Code
Naf	1	Cassia County	83342
Nampa	1	Canyon County	83651
Naples	1	Boundary County	83847
Neeley	1	Power County	83211
Nelson	1	Clearwater County
Neva	1	Clearwater County
New Centerville	1	Boise County	83631
Newdale	1	Fremont County	83436
New Meadows	1	Adams County	83654
New Plymouth	1	Payette County	83655
Newsome	1	Idaho County
New Sweden	1	Bonneville County	83401
Nezperce	1	Lewis County	83543
Nez Perce Indian Reservation	4	Clearwater County	83540
Nez Perce Indian Reservation	4	Idaho County	83540
Nez Perce Indian Reservation	4	Lewis County	83540
Nez Perce Indian Reservation	4	Nez Perce County	83540
Nez Perce National Historical Park	3	Clearwater County	83551
Nez Perce National Historical Park	3	Idaho County	83551
Nez Perce National Historical Park	3	Nez Perce County	83551
Nicholia	1	Lemhi County
Niter	1	Caribou County	83241
Nordman	1	Bonner County	83848
Norland	1	Minidoka County
North Fork	1	Lemhi County	83466
North Kenyon	1	Cassia County
North Lapwai	1	Nez Perce County
North Lewiston	1	Nez Perce County	83501
North Pole	1	Kootenai County
Northside	1	Ada County	83702
Northside	1	Gem County	83617
Norwood	1	Valley County
Notus	1	Canyon County	83656
Nounan	1	Bear Lake County	83254
Nucrag	1	Lewis County

== O ==
Name of place	Number of counties	Principal county	Lower ZIP Code	Upper ZIP Code
Oakley	1	Cassia County	83346
Obsidian	1	Custer County	83340
Oden	1	Bonner County
Ola	1	Gem County	83657
Old Beaver	1	Clark County
Old Fort	1	Valley County
Old Golden	1	Idaho County
Oldtown	1	Bonner County	83822
Olsen	1	Bingham County
Omega	1	Benewah County
Omill	1	Clearwater County
Onaway	1	Latah County	83855
Orchard	1	Ada County	83707
Orchard Station	1	Ada County	83704
Oreana	1	Owyhee County	83650
Orofino	1	Clearwater County	83544
Orogrande	1	Idaho County	83525
Orvin	1	Bonneville County
Osburn	1	Shoshone County	83849
Osgood	1	Bonneville County	83401
Outlet Bay	1	Bonner County
Ovid	1	Bear Lake County	83260
Owinza	1	Lincoln County
Owyhee	1	Ada County
Owyhee Heights	1	Owyhee County
Oxford	1	Franklin County	83263

== P ==
Name of place	Number of counties	Principal county	Lower ZIP Code	Upper ZIP Code
Pagari	1	Lincoln County
Page	1	Shoshone County	83868
Palisades	1	Bonneville County	83437
Palisades Corner	1	Payette County
Panhandle Village	1	Kootenai County	83854
Paradise Hot Springs	1	Elmore County	83647
Pardee	1	Idaho County
Paris	1	Bear Lake County	83261
Park	1	Latah County	83823
Parker	1	Fremont County	83438
Parkinson	1	Madison County
Parkline	1	Benewah County	83851
Parma	1	Canyon County	83660
Parsons	1	Twin Falls County
Patterson	1	Lemhi County	83253
Paul	1	Minidoka County	83347
Pauline	1	Power County	83212
Payette	1	Payette County	83661
Payette Heights	1	Payette County
Payne	1	Bonneville County
Pearl	1	Gem County	83616
Pearson	1	Shoshone County
Peavey	1	Twin Falls County
Pebble	1	Caribou County	83217
Peck	1	Clearwater County
Peck	1	Nez Perce County	83545
Pedee	1	Benewah County	83851
Pegram	1	Bear Lake County	83254
Pella	1	Cassia County	83318
Penitentiary Spur	1	Ada County
Perkins	1	Ada County
Perrine	1	Jerome County
Pescadero	1	Bear Lake County
Peterson Corners	1	Clearwater County	83553
Picabo	1	Blaine County	83348
Pierce	1	Clearwater County	83546
Pilgrim Stage Station Historic Site	1	Elmore County
Pine	1	Elmore County	83647
Pine Creek	1	Shoshone County
Pinehurst	1	Adams County	83654
Pinehurst	1	Shoshone County	83850
Pine Ridge	1	Adams County	83612
Pineview	1	Fremont County
Pingree	1	Bingham County	83262
Pioneerville	1	Boise County	83631
Placerville	1	Boise County	83666
Plano	1	Madison County	83440
Plaza	1	Gem County
Pleasant Valley	1	Ada County
Pleasant View	1	Kootenai County
Pleasantview	1	Oneida County	83252
Plummer	1	Benewah County	83851
Plummer Junction	1	Benewah County
Pocatello	2	Bannock County	83201	06
Pocatello	2	Power County	83201	06
Pocatello Municipal Airport	1	Bannock County	83201
Pocono	1	Shoshone County
Polaris	1	Shoshone County	83849
Pollock	1	Idaho County	83547
Ponderay	1	Bonner County	83852
Ponds Resort	1	Fremont County	83429
Poorman	1	Clearwater County
Poplar	1	Bonneville County
Porthill	1	Boundary County	83853
Portneuf	1	Bannock County	83201
Post Falls	1	Kootenai County	83854
Potlatch	1	Latah County	83855
Potlatch Junction	1	Latah County	83855
Powell Junction	1	Idaho County
Prairie	1	Elmore County	83647
Presley	1	Washington County
Preston	1	Franklin County	83263
Prichard	1	Shoshone County	83873
Priest River	1	Bonner County	83856
Princeton	1	Latah County	83857
Punkin Corner	1	Camas County
Purdue	1	Latah County
Pyke	1	Fremont County

== Q ==
Name of place	Number of counties	Principal county	Lower ZIP Code	Upper ZIP Code
Quartzburg	1	Boise County
Quigley	1	Power County

== R ==
Name of place	Number of counties	Principal county	Lower ZIP Code	Upper ZIP Code
Raft River	1	Cassia County	83211
Ramey	1	Payette County
Ramsdell	1	Benewah County	83851
Ramsey	1	Kootenai County
Rands	1	Camas County
Rankin Mill	1	Adams County
Rathdrum	1	Kootenai County	83858
Rawson	1	Lincoln County
Raymond	1	Bear Lake County	83238
Rebecca	1	Washington County
Reclamation Village	1	Elmore County
Redfish Lake	1	Custer County	83278
Red River Hot Springs	1	Idaho County	83525
Red Rock Junction	1	Bannock County
Regina	1	Ada County
Renfrew	1	Benewah County
Reno	1	Clark County	83423
Reubens	1	Lewis County	83548
Reverse	1	Elmore County
Revling	1	Clearwater County
Rexburg	1	Madison County	83440
Reynolds	1	Owyhee County	83650
Richfield	1	Lincoln County	83349
Riddle	1	Owyhee County	83604
Ridgedale	1	Oneida County
Rigby	1	Jefferson County	83442
Riggins	1	Idaho County	83549
Riggins Hot Springs	1	Idaho County
Ririe	2	Bonneville County	83443
Ririe	2	Jefferson County	83443
Rising River	1	Bingham County
Ritz	1	Boundary County
Riverdale	1	Benewah County	83861
Riverdale	1	Franklin County	83263
Riverside	1	Bingham County	83221
Riverside	1	Canyon County	83605
Riverside	1	Clearwater County	83544
Roberts	1	Jefferson County	83444
Robin	1	Bannock County	83214
Robinson Bar	1	Custer County
Rockaway Beach	1	Kootenai County	83835
Rock Creek	1	Twin Falls County	83334
Rockford	1	Bingham County	83221
Rockford Bay	1	Kootenai County	83814
Rock Island	1	Washington County
Rockland	1	Power County	83271
Rocky Bar	1	Elmore County	83647
Rocky Point	1	Benewah County	83851
Rogerson	1	Twin Falls County	83302
Roland	1	Shoshone County
Rookstool Corner	1	Canyon County
Rooney	1	Clearwater County
Rose	1	Bingham County	83221
Rose	1	Caribou County
Roseberry	1	Valley County	83615
Rose Lake	1	Kootenai County	83810
Roseworth	1	Twin Falls County	83321
Roswell	1	Canyon County	83660
Rouse	1	Bingham County
Rover	1	Benewah County
Roy	1	Power County	83271
Roy Summit	1	Oneida County
Rubicon	1	Adams County
Ruby	1	Cassia County
Rudo	1	Clearwater County
Rupert	1	Minidoka County	83350
Ryan Spur	1	Benewah County

== S ==
Name of place	Number of counties	Principal county	Lower ZIP Code	Upper ZIP Code
Saddler	1	Boundary County
Sage Junction	1	Jefferson County
Sagle	1	Bonner County	83860
Saint Anthony	1	Fremont County	83445
Saint Charles	1	Bear Lake County	83272
Saint Joe	1	Benewah County	83861
Saint Johns	1	Oneida County	83252
Saint Leon	1	Bonneville County	83401
Saint Maries	1	Benewah County	83861
Salem	1	Madison County	83440
Salmon	1	Lemhi County	83467
Sam	1	Teton County
Samaria	1	Oneida County	83252
Samuels	1	Bonner County	83862
Sand Bank	1	Elmore County
Sanders	1	Benewah County	83870
Sand Hollow	1	Payette County
Sandpoint	1	Bonner County	83864
Sand Spur	1	Idaho County
Santa	1	Benewah County	83866
Sawtooth City	1	Blaine County	83353
Sawyer	1	Bonner County
Schiller	1	Power County
Schnoors	1	Boundary County
Schodde	1	Jerome County
Schow	1	Minidoka County
Scoville	1	Butte County
Seaburg	1	Idaho County
Sebree	1	Elmore County
Seelovers Spur	1	Boundary County
Selby	1	Camas County	83327
Selle	1	Bonner County	83864
Seneacquoteen	1	Bonner County
Senter	1	Lincoln County
Setters	1	Kootenai County
Sharon	1	Bear Lake County	83260
Shelley	1	Bingham County	83274
Shells Lick	1	Idaho County
Shelton	1	Jefferson County	83401
Sherwin	1	Latah County
Sherwood Beach	1	Bonner County
Shiloh	1	Boundary County
Shont	1	Shoshone County
Shoshone	1	Lincoln County	83352
Shoup	1	Lemhi County	83469
Silver Beach	1	Kootenai County
Silver City	1	Owyhee County	83650
Silver Creek Plunge	1	Valley County	83622
Silver King	1	Shoshone County
Silver Sands Beach	1	Kootenai County	83858
Silverton	1	Shoshone County	83867
Simplot	1	Canyon County
Sinclair	1	Boundary County
Skyline	1	Bonneville County	83401
Slacks Corner	1	Owyhee County
Slate Creek	1	Idaho County	83554
Slickpoo	1	Lewis County
Small	1	Clark County	83423
Smelter Heights	1	Shoshone County	83837
Smelterville	1	Shoshone County	83868
Smith Corrals	1	Butte County
Smiths Ferry	1	Valley County	83611
Smith Springs	1	Blaine County
Smokehouse	1	Idaho County
Soda Springs	1	Caribou County	83276
Soda Springs	1	Caribou County	83276
Soldier	1	Camas County	83327
Soldiers Home	1	Ada County
Sonna	1	Ada County
South Boise	1	Ada County
South Gate Plaza	1	Nez Perce County	83501
South Mountain	1	Owyhee County
Southside	1	Ada County	83706
Southwick	1	Nez Perce County	83537
Spalding	1	Nez Perce County	83551
Spanish Town	1	Elmore County
Spencer	1	Clark County	83446
Spirit Lake	1	Kootenai County	83869
Springdale	1	Cassia County	83318
Springfield	1	Bingham County	83277
Springston	1	Kootenai County
Squaw Bay	1	Kootenai County	83833
Squirrel	1	Fremont County	83447
Staley Springs	1	Fremont County
Stanford	1	Latah County
Stanley	1	Custer County	83278
Star	1	Ada County	83669
Starkey	1	Adams County
Starrhs Ferry	1	Cassia County	83318
State Line	1	Kootenai County	83854
State Line Village	1	Kootenai County
Steamboat Rock	1	Elmore County
Steamboat Rocks	1	Shoshone County
Steirman	1	Boise County	83631
Sterling	1	Bingham County	83210
Stetson	1	Shoshone County
Stevens	1	Adams County
Stibnite	1	Valley County	83677
Stites	1	Idaho County	83552
Stoddard	1	Canyon County	83641
Stone	1	Oneida County	83280
Strevell	1	Cassia County	83345
Stull	1	Shoshone County
Sturgeon	1	Kootenai County
Sublett	1	Cassia County	83342
Suckpoo	1	Lewis County	83524
Sugar City	1	Madison County	83448
Sugar Loaf	1	Jerome County	83338
Sully	1	Twin Falls County
Summit	1	Clearwater County
Sunbeam	1	Custer County	83278
Sunnydell	1	Madison County	83440
Sunnyside	1	Bonner County	83864
Sunnyside	1	Shoshone County	83837
Sunnyslope	1	Canyon County	83605
Sun Valley	1	Blaine County	83353
Swanlake	1	Bannock County	83281
Swan Lake	1	Bannock County
Swan Valley	1	Bonneville County	83449
Swartz Corner	1	Canyon County
Sweeney	1	Shoshone County
Sweet	1	Gem County	83670
Sweetwater	1	Nez Perce County	83540
Syringa	1	Idaho County	83539

== T ==
Name of place	Number of counties	Principal county	Lower ZIP Code	Upper ZIP Code
Taber	1	Bingham County	83221
Talache	1	Bonner County	83860
Talmage	1	Caribou County
Tamarack	1	Adams County	83612
Taylor	1	Bonneville County	83401
Taylorville	1	Bonneville County	83401
Teakean	1	Clearwater County	83541
Telegraph Hill	1	Owyhee County
Tendoy	1	Lemhi County	83468
Ten Mile	1	Ada County	83642
Tensed	1	Benewah County	83870
Terreton	1	Jefferson County	83450
Teton	1	Fremont County	83451
Tetonia	1	Teton County	83452
Thain Road	1	Nez Perce County	83501
Thama	1	Bonner County
Thatcher	1	Franklin County	83283
The Cedars	1	Clearwater County
Thiard	1	Shoshone County
Thomas	1	Bingham County	83221
Thomas Junction	1	Bingham County	83221
Thorensen	1	Franklin County
Thornton	1	Madison County	83440
Three Creek	1	Owyhee County	83302
Three Forks	1	Owyhee County
Threemile Corner	1	Boundary County	83805
Ticeska	1	Gooding County
Tiegs Corner	1	Canyon County
Tikura	1	Blaine County
Tipperary Corner	1	Jerome County
Topaz	1	Bannock County	83246
Torreys	1	Custer County	83227
Tramway	1	Idaho County
Transfer	1	Nez Perce County	83501
Travers	1	Minidoka County
Treasureton	1	Franklin County	83263
Trestle Creek	1	Bonner County	83836
Triangle	1	Owyhee County
Triumph	1	Blaine County	83333
Trout	1	Cassia County
Troy	1	Latah County	83871
Trude	1	Fremont County
Tuanna Crossing	1	Twin Falls County
Tunupa	1	Lincoln County
Turner	1	Caribou County	83241
Turner Bay	1	Kootenai County	83833
Turnpike	1	Bear Lake County
Tuttle	1	Gooding County	83314
Twin Beaches	1	Kootenai County
Twin Falls	1	Twin Falls County	83301
Twin Falls City-County Airport	1	Twin Falls County	83301
Twin Forks	1	Teton County
Twin Groves	1	Fremont County	83445
Twin Lakes	1	Kootenai County	83858
Twinlow	1	Kootenai County	83858
Twin Springs	1	Boise County
Two Forks	1	Teton County
Tyhee	1	Bannock County	83201
Tyson Creek	1	Benewah County

== U ==
Name of place	Number of counties	Principal county	Lower ZIP Code	Upper ZIP Code
Ucon	1	Bonneville County	83454
Ulysses	1	Lemhi County
Underkoflers Corner	1	Canyon County
Unity	1	Cassia County	83318
University	1	Latah County	83843
Ustick	1	Ada County	83704

== V ==
Name of place	Number of counties	Principal county	Lower ZIP Code	Upper ZIP Code
Valley View Heights	1	Nez Perce County	83501
Vans Corner	1	Bonner County
Vassar	1	Latah County
Vay	1	Bonner County
Vernon	1	Ada County	83455
Victor	1	Teton County	83455
View	1	Cassia County	83318
Viola	1	Latah County	83872
Virginia	1	Bannock County	83234

== W ==
Name of place	Number of counties	Principal county	Lower ZIP Code	Upper ZIP Code
Waha	1	Nez Perce County	83501
Walker	1	Madison County
Wallace	1	Shoshone County	83873
Walters Ferry	1	Canyon County
Wamar	1	Madison County
Wapello	1	Bingham County	83221
Wapi	1	Blaine County
Wardboro	1	Bear Lake County	83254
Wardner	1	Shoshone County	83837
Warm Lake	1	Valley County	83611
Warm River	1	Fremont County	83420
Warr	1	Cassia County
Warren	1	Idaho County	83671
Warrens	1	Canyon County
Washington Mill	1	Boise County
Washoe	1	Payette County
Washoe Spur	1	Canyon County
Wayan	1	Caribou County	83285
Wayland	1	Benewah County
Webb	1	Nez Perce County	83540
Webb	1	Shoshone County
Weippe	1	Clearwater County	83553
Weiser	1	Washington County	83672
Weitz	1	Canyon County	83605
Wendell	1	Gooding County	83355
Westgate Acres	1	Ada County
Westlake	1	Idaho County	83526
Westland Acres	1	Ada County
Westma	1	Canyon County
Westmond	1	Bonner County	83860
Westmoreland	1	Ada County
West Mountain	1	Valley County	83611
Weston	1	Franklin County	83286
Whipsaw Saddle	1	Idaho County
White Bird	1	Idaho County	83554
Whitney	1	Ada County	83705
Whitney	1	Franklin County	83263
Whitney Beach	1	Ada County
Wickahoney	1	Owyhee County
Wilder	1	Canyon County	83676
Wilder Radar Bomb Scoring Site	1	Canyon County	83676
Wilford	1	Fremont County	83445
Willard	1	Benewah County
Willola	1	Nez Perce County
Winchester	1	Lewis County	83555
Winder	1	Franklin County
Winona	1	Idaho County
Winsper	1	Clark County
Wolf Lodge	1	Kootenai County
Wolverine	1	Bingham County
Wood	1	Payette County
Woodland	1	Adams County
Woodland	1	Idaho County	83536
Woodland Park	1	Shoshone County	83873
Woodruff	1	Oneida County	83252
Woodville	1	Bingham County	83274
Wooley Valley	1	Caribou County
Worley	1	Kootenai County	83876
Wrencoe	1	Bonner County

== Y ==
Name of place	Number of counties	Principal county	Lower ZIP Code	Upper ZIP Code
Yale	1	Latah County
Yellowjacket	1	Lemhi County
Yellow Pine	1	Valley County	83677
Yellowstone National Park	1	Fremont County	82190

== Z ==
Name of place	Number of counties	Principal county	Lower ZIP Code	Upper ZIP Code
Zaza	1	Nez Perce County
Zenda	1	Bannock County

== See also ==
- List of places in Idaho: A–K
