= Lakeview =

Lakeview may refer to:

== Australia ==
- Lake View, South Australia, or Lakeview
- Lakeview Homestead Complex, a homestead located in the Eurobodalla Shire

== Canada ==
- Lakeview, Alberta
- Lakeview, Calgary, Alberta
- Lakeview Heights, West Kelowna, British Columbia
- Lakeview, Manitoba
- Lakeview, New Brunswick
- Lakeview, Halifax, Nova Scotia
- Lakeview, Newfoundland and Labrador
- Lakeview, Elgin County, Ontario
- Lakeview, Mississauga in Peel Region, Ontario
- Lakeview, Simcoe County, Ontario
- Lakeview Beach, Ontario
- Lakeview Heights, Ontario
- Lakeview Park (Nepean), Nepean, Ontario
- Lakeview, Harrington, Quebec
- Lakeview-Terrasse, Quebec, Deschênes District, Gatineau, Quebec
- Rural Municipality of Lakeview No. 337, Saskatchewan
- Lakeview, Regina, Saskatchewan, a residential neighbourhood
- Lakeview, Saskatoon, Saskatchewan, a residential neighbourhood
- Lakeview Beach, Saskatchewan, Rural Municipality of North Qu'Appelle No. 187

== United Kingdom ==
- Lakeview Estate, Tower Hamlets, London
- Lakeview, an area of the Wixams new town development in Bedfordshire

== United States ==
- Lakeview, Alabama
- Lakeview, Arkansas
- Lakeview, California, in Riverside County
- Lakeview, Georgia
- Lakeview, Idaho
- Lakeview, Illinois
- Lake View, Chicago, or Lakeview, Illinois
- Lakeview, Kentucky, since annexed by Fort Wright
- Lakeview, Louisiana, a suburb of Shreveport
- Lakeview, New Orleans, Louisiana, a neighborhood of New Orleans
- Lakeview, Michigan
- Lakeview, Missouri
- Lakeview, Paterson, New Jersey
- Lakeview, New York
- Lakeview, Ohio
- Lakeview, Oregon
- Lakeview, South Dakota
- Lakeview, Texas
- Lakeview, Washington
- Lacy Lakeview, Texas
- Lakeview Mountain, a subfeature of Diamond Peak, Oregon

== Schools ==
- Lakeview High School (disambiguation), multiple schools
- Lakeview Jr. High School, Downers Grove, Illinois, U.S.
- Lakeview Middle School (disambiguation), multiple schools
- Lakeview Public Schools (Michigan)
- École Lakeview School, Saskatoon, Saskatchewan

== See also ==
- Lake View (disambiguation)
