= National Register of Historic Places listings in Benewah County, Idaho =

Location of Benewah County in Idaho

This is a list of the National Register of Historic Places listings in Benewah County, Idaho.

This is intended to be a complete list of the properties on the National Register of Historic Places in Benewah County, Idaho, United States. Latitude and longitude coordinates are provided for many National Register properties and districts; these locations may be seen together in a map.

There are 9 properties listed on the National Register in the county. More may be added; properties and districts nationwide are added to the Register weekly.

This National Park Service list is complete through NPS recent listings posted May 30, 2025.

== Current listings ==
	Name on the Register	Image	Date listed	Location	City or town	Description
1	Benewah County Courthouse	Benewah County Courthouse	September 22, 1987 (#87001580)	College Ave. and 7th St. 47°18′54″N 116°34′01″W	St. Maries	
2	Chatcolet CCC Picnic and Camping Area	Chatcolet CCC Picnic and Camping Area	February 1, 1995 (#94000632)	State Highway 5 in Heyburn State Park; 47°22′32″N 116°45′46″W	Chatcolet	
3	Coeur d'Alene Mission of the Sacred Heart	Coeur d'Alene Mission of the Sacred Heart	April 21, 1975 (#75000623)	Off U.S. Route 95; 47°08′45″N 116°54′52″W	De Smet	Destroyed by fire in 2011.
4	Kootenai Inn	Kootenai Inn	November 16, 1979 (#79000774)	130 N. 9th St. 47°19′01″N 116°34′07″W	St. Maries	Building no longer exists.
5	Mullan Road	Mullan Road	April 5, 1990 (#90000548)	3 segments: between Alder Creek and Cedar Creek; Fourth of July Pass between Interstate 80 and old U.S. Route 10; and Heyburn State Park; 47°22′37″N 116°45′50″W	St. Maries	Extends into Kootenai County
6	Plummer Point CCC Picnic and Hiking Area	Plummer Point CCC Picnic and Hiking Area	February 1, 1995 (#94001587)	State Highway 5 in Heyburn State Park; 47°21′38″N 116°46′36″W	Chatcolet	
7	Rocky Point CCC Properties	Rocky Point CCC Properties	February 1, 1995 (#94001588)	State Highway 5 in Heyburn State Park; 47°21′17″N 116°44′53″W	Chatcolet	
8	St. Maries 1910 Fire Memorial	St. Maries 1910 Fire Memorial	September 20, 1984 (#84001010)	St. Maries Cemetery; 47°18′56″N 116°35′12″W	St. Maries	
9	St. Maries Masonic Temple No. 63	St. Maries Masonic Temple No. 63	September 23, 2011 (#11000699)	208 S. 8th St. 47°18′54″N 116°34′03″W	St. Maries	

== See also ==
- List of National Historic Landmarks in Idaho
- National Register of Historic Places listings in Idaho
