= Idaho State Highway 5 =

State highway in Idaho, United States

State Highway 5
- SH-5 highlighted in red

Route information
- Maintained by ITD
- Length: 19.108 mi (30.751 km)

Major junctions
- West end: US 95 in Plummer
- East end: SH-3 in Saint Maries

Location
- Country: United States
- State: Idaho
- Counties: Benewah

Highway system
- Idaho State Highway System; Interstate; US; State
← SH-4	→ SH-6

State Highway 5 (SH-5) is a state highway in Benewah County, in the U.S. state of Idaho. It runs 19.108 miles (30.751 km) from U.S. Route 95 (US 95) in Plummer, east to SH-3 in Saint Maries.

== Route description ==
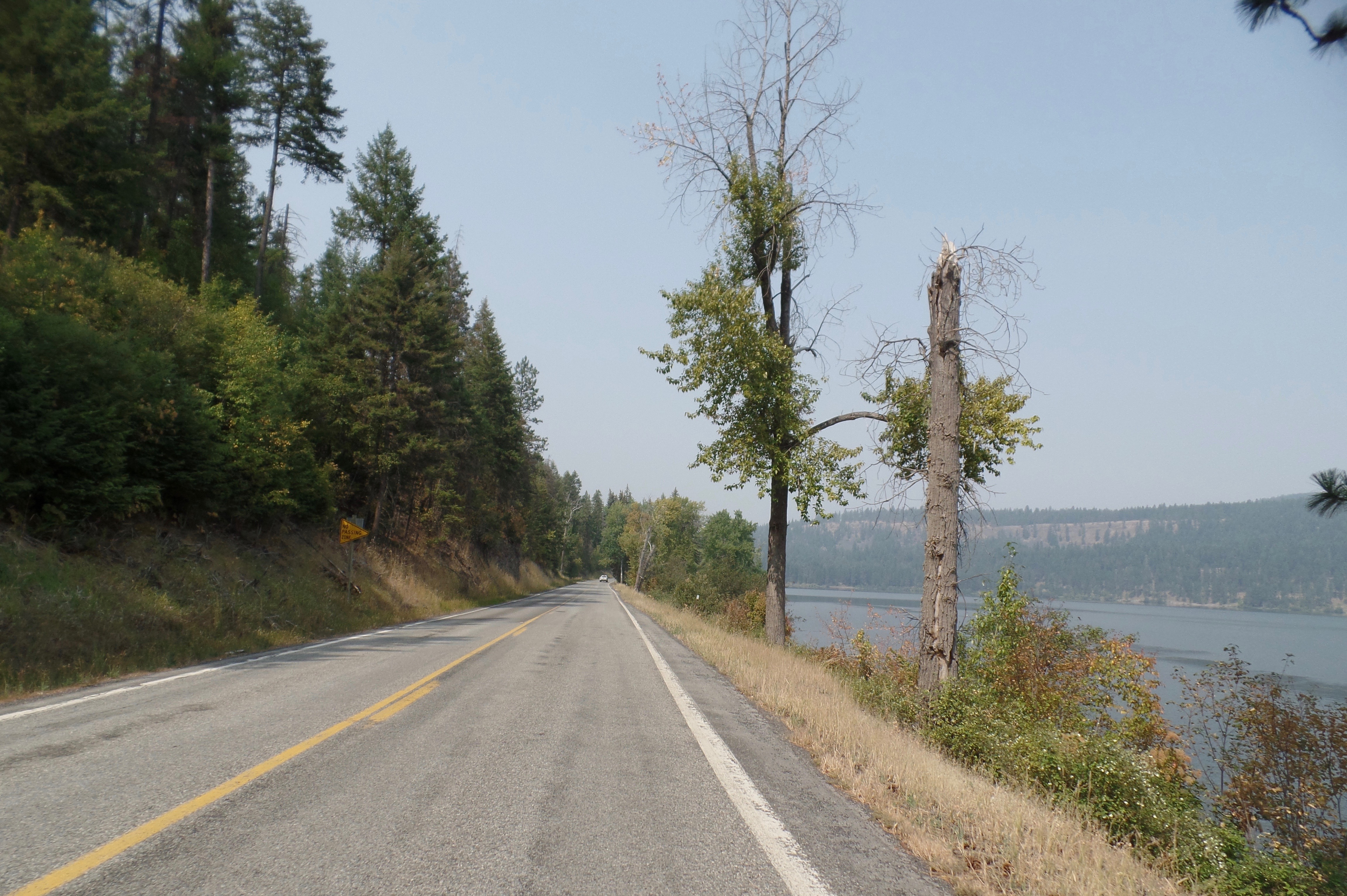
SH-5 westbound along Chatcolet Lake, August 2018

SH-5 begins at an intersection with US 95 in Plummer and heads east through Heyburn State Park, running along the south shore of Chatcolet Lake and Benewah Lake to Parkline. It then continues east past a historical marker for John Mullan into Saint Maries and onto the Coeur d'Alene Indian Reservation within the city, where it ends at an intersection with SH-3.

== History ==
John Mullan built the first road from Fort Benton, Montana to the modern site of Walla Walla, Washington from 1858 to 1862. SH-5 may run in part along this route.

== Major intersections ==
The entire route is in Benewah County.

Location	mi	km	Destinations	Notes
Plummer	0.000	0.000	US 95	Western terminus
Saint Maries	19.140	30.803	SH-3	Eastern terminus
1.000 mi = 1.609 km; 1.000 km = 0.621 mi

== See also ==
- List of state highways in Idaho
