= Fernwood, Idaho =

Unincorporated community in the state of Idaho, United States

- Town
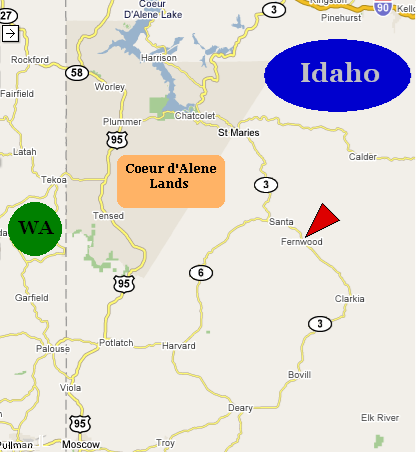
- Fernwood in North Idaho
- Coordinates: 47°07′00″N 116°23′03″W
- Country: United States
- State: Idaho
- County: Benewah
- Elevation: 2,763 ft (842 m)

Population (2020)
  - Total: 702
- Time zone: UTC-8 (Pacific Time Zone)
  - Summer (DST): UTC-7
- ZIP code: 83830
- Area code: 208
- GNIS feature ID: 2806609

Fernwood is a small unincorporated community in the southeastern corner of Benewah County, Idaho, United States, located just to the east of State Highway 3. The city shares a public K-6 school with the communities of Clarkia, Santa and Emida. All students attend high school and middle school in St. Maries.

The 2000 census recorded a population of 684 with an average household income of $27,578. The median age in the tabulation area is 41.2 and the average household size is 2.51.

== History ==
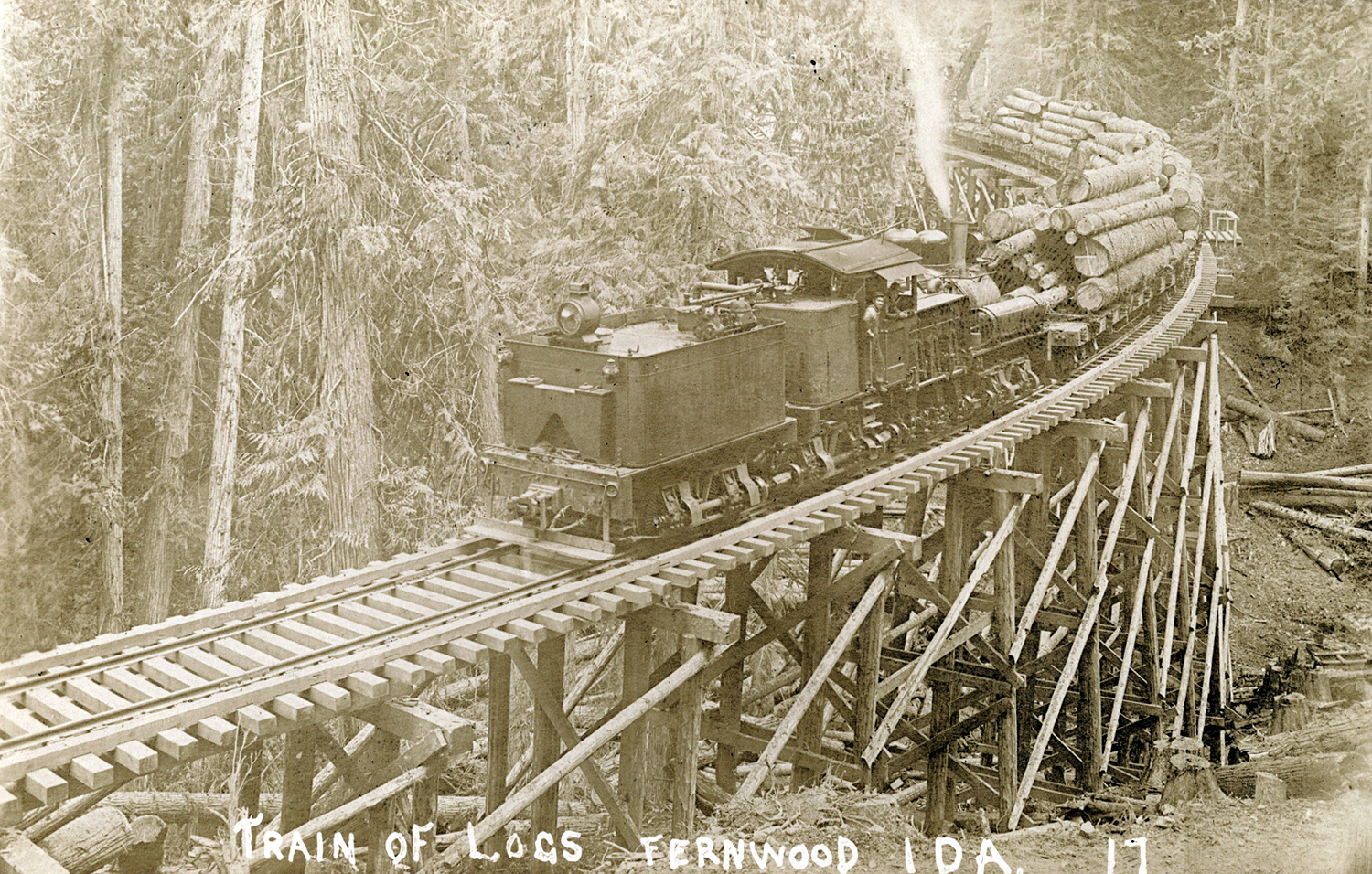
Logging near Fernwood ca. 1910

The Coeur d’Alene people initially inhabited this area for thousands of years prior to the coming of white settlers. The native name of the area is Epschssups'n or “It has a little tail.”

Fernwood's population was estimated at 250 in 1960.
