= Idaho State Highway 60 =

State highway in Idaho, United States

State Highway 60
- SH-60 highlighted in red

Route information
- Maintained by ITD
- Length: 5.510 mi (8.867 km)
- Existed: 1959–present

Major junctions
- West end: SR 274 at the Washington state line
- East end: US 95 near Tensed

Location
- Country: United States
- State: Idaho
- Counties: Benewah

Highway system
- Idaho State Highway System; Interstate; US; State
← SH-58	→ SH-61

State Highway 60 (SH-60) is a state highway in Benewah County, Idaho, United States. It connects Washington State Route 274 at the Washington state line to U.S. Route 95 (US-95). The highway is approximately 5.5 miles (8.9 km) long and runs east–west.

== Route description ==
SH-60 begins at the Washington state line as a continuation of Washington State Route 274, which travels west to Tekoa. The highway crosses Little Hangman Creek and travels southeast along Moctileme Creek; it continues east along the creek to a junction with US-95. SH-60 ends at the junction with US-95, which serves as the main north–south highway in the Idaho Panhandle region. The entire highway lies within the Coeur d'Alene Reservation in Benewah County.

== History ==
SH-60 was added to the state highway system on September 17, 1959, by the Idaho Board of Highway Directors.

== Major intersections ==
The entire route is in Benewah County.

Location	mi	km	Destinations	Notes
	0.000	0.000	SR 274 west – Tekoa	Continuation into Washington
	5.510	8.867	US 95 north – Plummer, Coeur d'Alene, Moscow	Eastern terminus
1.000 mi = 1.609 km; 1.000 km = 0.621 mi

== See also ==
- List of state highways in Idaho
