= Wapello =

Wapello may refer to:

== People ==
- Wapello (chief) (1787-1842), a Native American chief

== Places ==
United States

- Wapello, Idaho
- Wapello, Iowa
- Wapello County, Iowa

== Ships ==
- USS Wapello (YN-56), a United States Navy net tender in commission from 1941 to 1946
