= Kootenai Inn =

- U.S. National Register of Historic Places
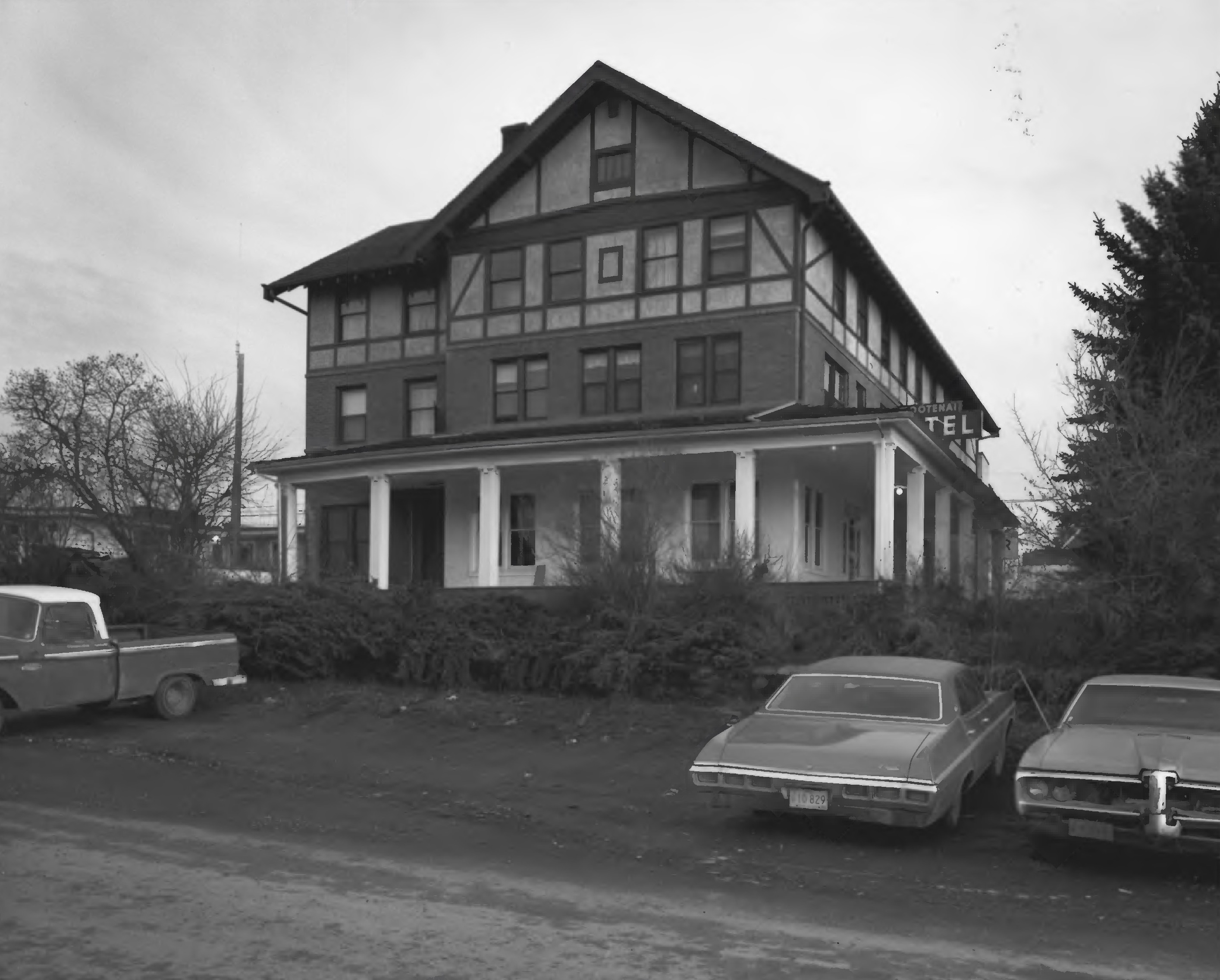
- The Kootenai Inn in 1978

- Location within Idaho Location within the United States
- Location: 130 N. 9th Street; St. Maries, Idaho
- Coordinates: 47°19′01″N 116°34′07″W
- Area: less than one acre
- Built: 1910
- Architect: Barker, D.J.
- Architectural style: Tudor Revival
- NRHP reference No.: 79000774
- Added to NRHP: November 16, 1979

The Kootenai Inn was a building located in St. Maries, Idaho listed on the National Register of Historic Places.

The inn was built by the Chicago, Milwaukee, St. Paul and Pacific Railroad for its passengers and its workers. When timber and mineral interests in the area were tapped out and when people began leaving to take part in World War II activities, the population of the town was cut in half. The inn fell into poor condition and was vacant and a candidate for demolition by 1979. However, in March 1980, two couples bought the inn and started a restoration. The new owners salvaged materials from another hotel, the St. Maries, that was possibly built by the same contractor as the Kootenai Inn.

== See also ==
- List of National Historic Landmarks in Idaho
- National Register of Historic Places listings in Benewah County, Idaho
