= St. Maries Masonic Temple No. 63 =

- U.S. National Register of Historic Places
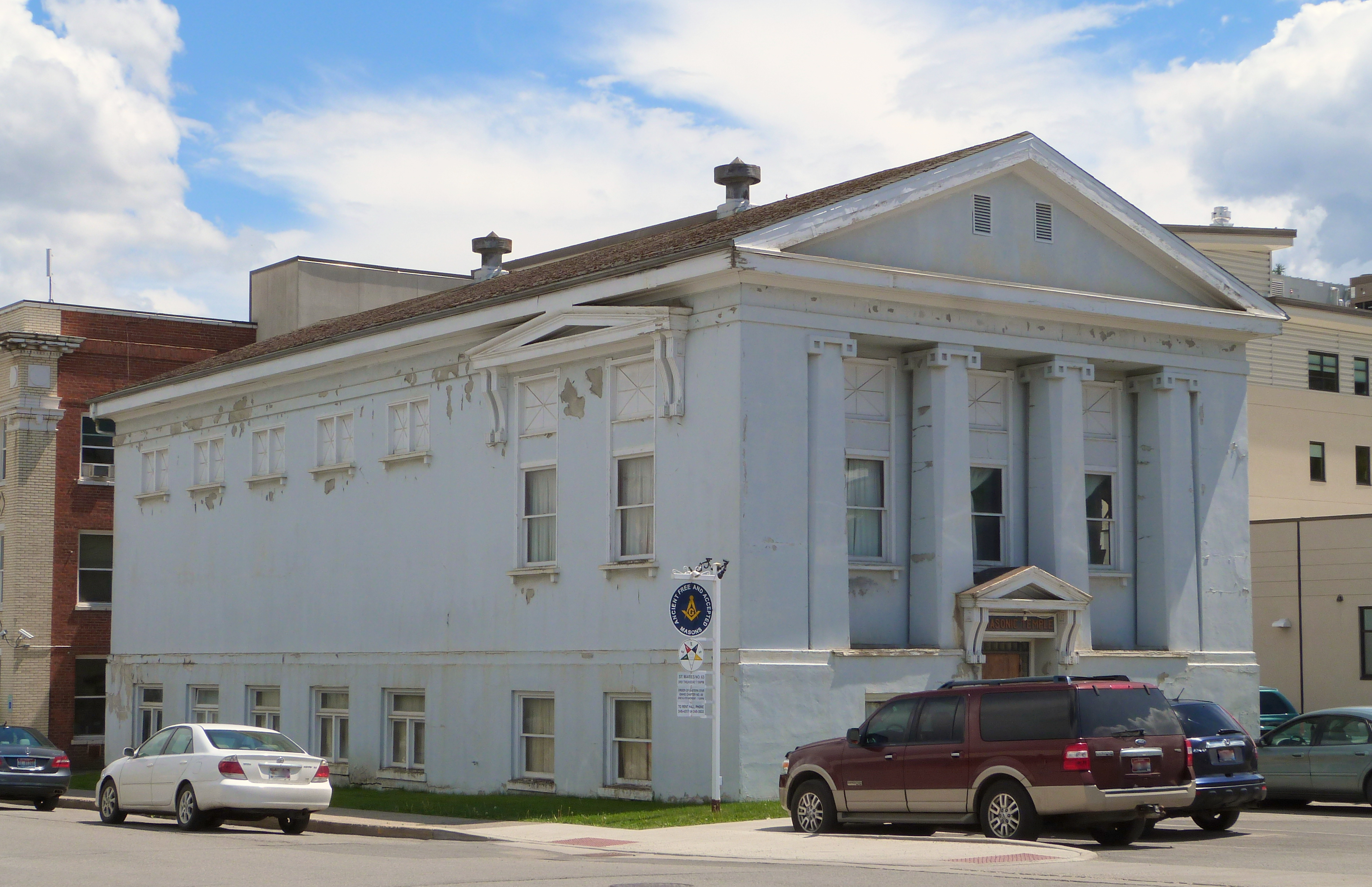
- The St. Maries Masonic Temple in 2015

- Location within Idaho Location within the United States
- Location: 208 S. 8th Street; St. Maries, Idaho
- Coordinates: 47°18′54″N 116°34′03″W
- Area: 1 acre (0.40 ha)
- NRHP reference No.: 11000699
- Added to NRHP: September 23, 2011

St. Maries Masonic Temple No. 63, also known as St. Maries Masonic Lodge No. 63, is a historic Masonic building located at 208 S. 8th Street in St. Maries, Idaho. It was listed on the National Register of Historic Places on September 23, 2011.

St. Maries Masonic Lodge No. 63 remains active and holds stated meetings on the first Thursday of each month.

== See also ==
- List of National Historic Landmarks in Idaho
- National Register of Historic Places listings in Benewah County, Idaho
