= Lake View =

Lake View is the name of several places:

== Australia ==
- Lake View, South Australia

== United States ==
- Lake View, Alabama
- Lake View, Arkansas
- Lake View, Chicago, Illinois
- Lake View, Indiana
- Lake View, Iowa
- Lake View Plantation, Maine
- Lake View Township, Becker County, Minnesota
- Lake View, Mississippi
- Lake View, South Carolina
- Lake View, Texas

== See also ==
- Lakeview (disambiguation)
- Lake View Cemetery (disambiguation)
