= Wickahoney Post Office and Stage Station =

- U.S. National Register of Historic Places
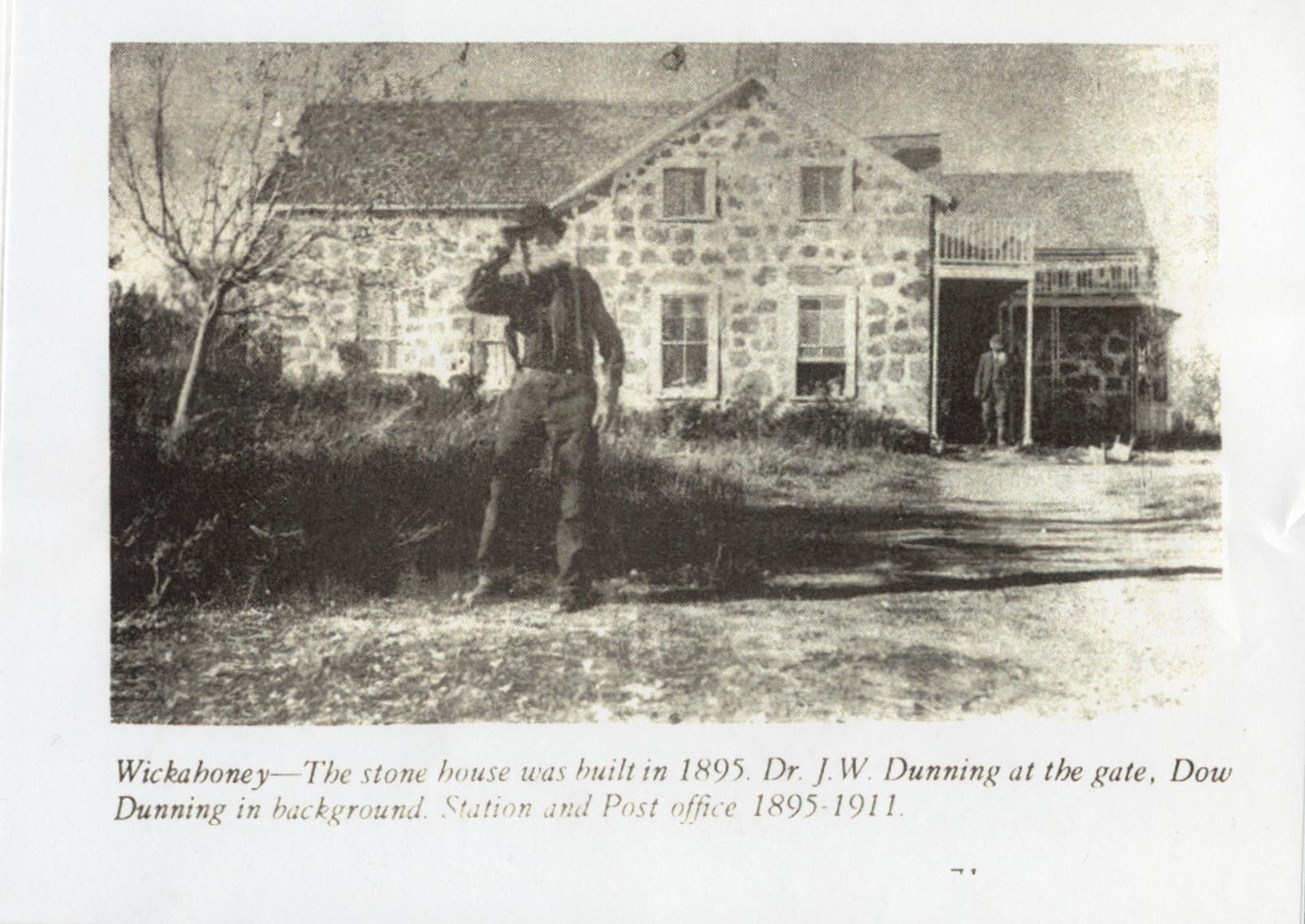
- Historic photo of the building

- Location within Idaho Location within the United States
- Location: Wickahoney Creek, Wickahoney, Idaho
- Coordinates: 42°27′22″N 115°59′02″W
- Area: less than one acre
- NRHP reference No.: 82002514
- Added to NRHP: May 27, 1982

The Wickahoney Post Office and Stage Station is an abandoned post office and stagecoach station which served the community of Wickahoney, Idaho. The building was built with lava rock and featured a wooden porch and a shingled roof with seven gables. It served as Wickahoney's post office from 1895 to 1911. In addition, the building was a stagecoach stop on the route between Mountain Home, Idaho and Mountain City, Nevada. The route brought supplies to mines in northern Nevada and was considered to be Wickahoney's best chance at economic success. However, a stagecoach route through Elko, Nevada supplanted the route through Wickahoney, and the community eventually faded away. The post office building is now located in a remote desert area; while its isolation helped preserve the building long after the stagecoach route ended, it has lost its roof and porch.

The building was added to the National Register of Historic Places on May 27, 1982.

== See also ==
- List of United States post offices
