= Lakeview High School =

Lakeview High School or Lake View High School may refer to:

== Canada ==
- St. Ignatius High School (Thunder Bay), Ontario, formerly Lakeview High School.
- Lakeview Secondary School, Toronto

== United States ==
- Lake View High School (Chicago), Illinois
- Lakeview High School (Connecticut)
- Lakeview Junior-Senior High School (Louisiana)
- Lakeview High School (Battle Creek, Michigan)
- Lakeview High School (St. Clair Shores, Michigan)
- Lakeview Junior-Senior High School (Nebraska)
- Lakeview High School (Ohio)
- Lakeview High School (Oregon)
- Lakeview Centennial High School, Garland, Texas
- Lake View High School (San Angelo, Texas)
- LakeView Technology Academy, Pleasant Prairie, Wisconsin

== See also ==
- Lakeview Middle School (disambiguation)
