= Flat Creek, Idaho =

Unincorporated community in the state of Idaho, United States

Flat Creek
- Unincorporated community
- Location within Idaho Location within the United States
- Coordinates: 47°13′56″N 116°29′29″W
- Country: United States
- State: Idaho
- County: Benewah
- Elevation: 3,002 ft (915 m)
- Time zone: UTC-8 (Pacific (PST))
  - Summer (DST): UTC-7 (PDT)
- Area codes: 208, 986
- GNIS feature ID: 376153

Flat Creek is an unincorporated community located in Benewah County, Idaho, United States.
