= Saint Joe, Idaho =

Unincorporated community in the state of Idaho, United States

Coordinates: 47°18′40″N 116°21′11″W

Saint Joe is an unincorporated community along the Saint Joe River within the St. Joe National Forest in northeastern Benewah County, Idaho, United States.

== History ==
A post office called Saint Joe was established in 1888, and remained in operation until it was discontinued in 1945. The community took its name from the nearby Saint Joe River.
