= Treasureton, Idaho =

Unincorporated community in Franklin County, Idaho, United States

Coordinates: 42°15′55″N 111°50′47″W

Treasureton is an unincorporated community along Battle Creek in Franklin County, Idaho, United States.

== History ==
A post office called Treasureton was established in 1881, and remained in operation until it was discontinued in 1944. William Treasure, the first postmaster, gave the community its name.
