= Marion, Idaho =

Unincorporated community in Cassia County, Idaho, United States

- Unincorporated community
- Location in Idaho Location in the United States
- Coordinates: 42°17′12″N 113°54′40″W
- Country: United States
- State: Idaho
- County: Cassia
- Elevation: 1,364 ft (416 m)
- Time zone: UTC-7 (Mountain (MST))
  - Summer (DST): UTC-6 (MDT)
- ZIP code: 83346
- Area codes: 208, 986
- GNIS feature ID: 386465

Marion is an unincorporated community in Cassia County, Idaho, United States, about 3.4 miles (5.5 km) north–northeast of Oakley.
