= New Sweden, Idaho =

Coordinates: 43°28′55″N 112°06′12″W

New Sweden
- Interactive map of New Sweden
- US State: Idaho
- County: Bonneville County

New Sweden is an unincorporated community in Bonneville County, Idaho.

New Sweden is a rural, largely agricultural community in southeastern Idaho. Farm land in the area was part of the irrigation development of the Great Western Land and Irrigation Company, an irrigation development utilizing water from the Snake River which flows northwest through the Bonneville County. New Sweden was largely settled by Swedish-Americans and Swedish immigrants beginning in 1894. By 1900, most of the arable land in the New Sweden area was claimed.
