= Santa, Idaho =

Unincorporated community in the state of Idaho, United States

Santa
- Unincorporated community
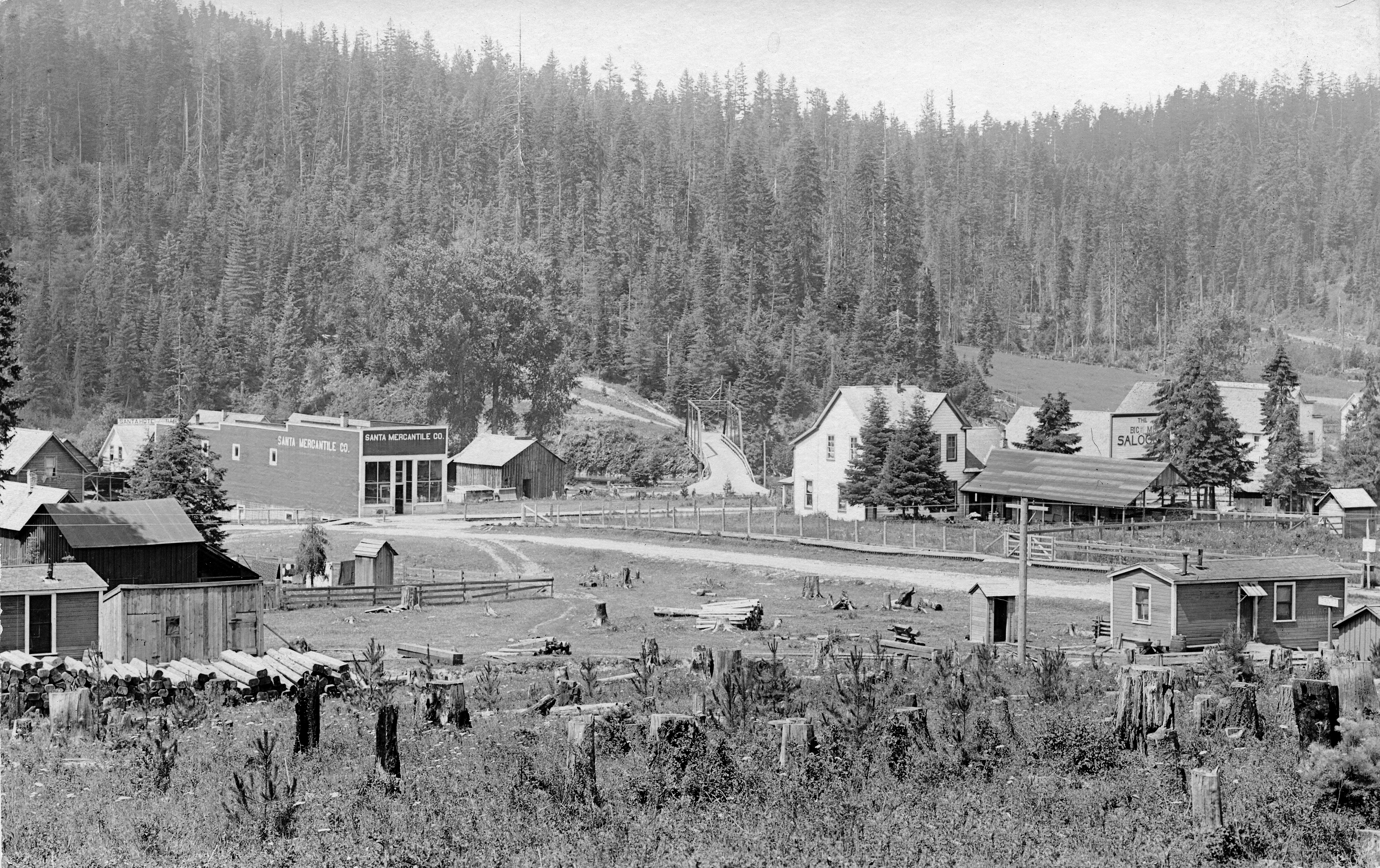
- Santa, circa 1910

- Location within Idaho Location within the United States
- Coordinates: 47°09′01″N 116°26′57″W
- Country: United States
- State: Idaho
- County: Benewah
- Elevation: 2,661 ft (811 m)
- Time zone: UTC-8 (Pacific (PST))
  - Summer (DST): UTC-7 (PDT)
- ZIP code: 83866
- Area codes: 208, 986
- GNIS feature ID: 374904

Santa is an unincorporated community in Benewah County, Idaho, United States. Santa is located on Idaho State Highway 3 13 miles (21 km) south-southeast of St. Maries. Santa has a post office with ZIP code 83866. The town changed its name to SecretSanta.com for a year, in 2005 to promote the website and to get at least $20,000.

== History ==
A post office called Santa has been in operation since 1887. The community took its name from nearby Santa Anna Creek.
