= Chatcolet, Idaho =

Unincorporated community in the state of Idaho, United States

- Unincorporated community
- Location within Idaho Location within the United States
- Coordinates: 47°22′20″N 116°45′49″W
- Country: United States
- State: Idaho
- County: Benewah
- Elevation: 2,129 ft (649 m)
- Time zone: UTC-8 (Pacific (PST))
  - Summer (DST): UTC-7 (PDT)
- Area codes: 208, 986
- GNIS feature ID: 371974

Chatcolet is an unincorporated community in Benewah County, Idaho, United States. Chatcolet is located on the western shore of Chatcolet Lake in Heyburn State Park.

== History ==
Chatcolet's population was 101 in 1960.
