= Winder, Idaho =

Unincorporated community in the state of Idaho, United States

Coordinates: 42°10′35″N 111°54′57″W

Winder is an unincorporated community in Franklin County, in the U.S. state of Idaho.

== History ==
The community was named after John R. Winder, a Mormon leader.
