= Benewah County, Idaho =

County in Idaho, United States

- County
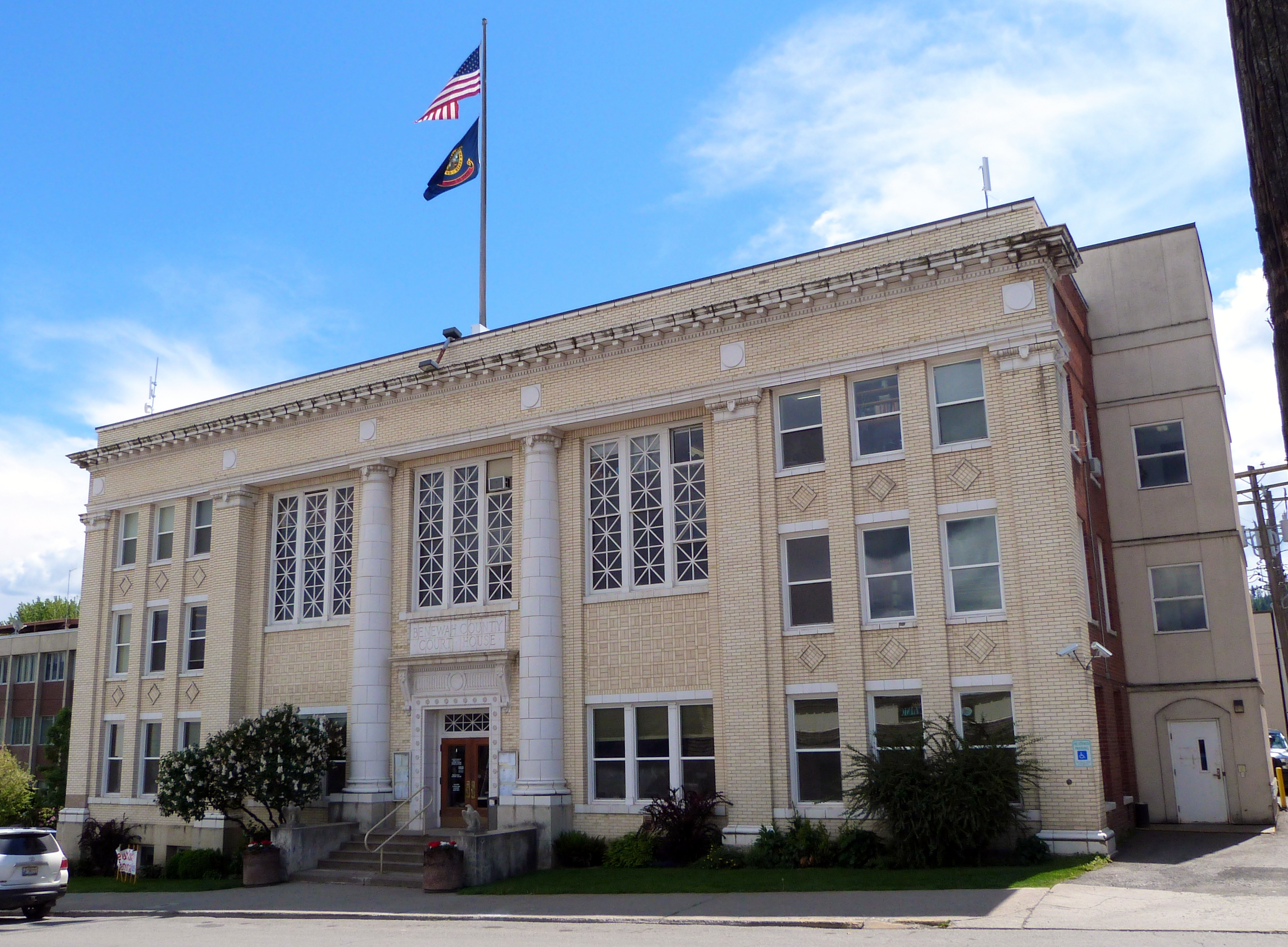
- Benewah County Courthouse

- Seal

- Location within the U.S. state of Idaho
- Coordinates: 47°13′N 116°40′W
- Country: United States
- State: Idaho
- Founded: January 23, 1915
- Seat: St. Maries
- Largest city: St. Maries

Area
  - Total: 784 sq mi (2,030 km^{2})
  - Land: 777 sq mi (2,010 km^{2})
  - Water: 7.3 sq mi (19 km^{2}) 0.9%

Population (2020)
  - Total: 9,530
  - Estimate (2025): 10,508 ▲
  - Density: 12.3/sq mi (4.74/km^{2})
- Time zone: UTC−8 (Pacific)
  - Summer (DST): UTC−7 (PDT)
- Congressional district: 1st
- Website: https://www.benewahcountyid.gov/

Benewah County (/ˈbɛnəˌwɑː/) is a county located in the northwest part of the U.S. state of Idaho. As of the 2020 United States census the county had a population of 9,530. The county seat and largest city is St. Maries, which has some area inside the Coeur d'Alene Reservation. The county was established on January 23, 1915, of land partitioned from Kootenai County. It was named for a chief of the Coeur d'Alene Tribe. The federally recognized Coeur d'Alene Tribe is based on the Coeur d'Alene Reservation in this and neighboring Kootenai County.

== Geography ==
Benewah County lies on the west line of the state. Its west boundary line abuts the east boundary line of the state of Washington. The county has a total area of 784 square miles (2,030 km^{2}), of which 777 square miles (2,010 km^{2}) is land and 7.3 square miles (19 km^{2}) (0.9%) is water. It is the northern part of the Palouse, a wide and rolling prairie-like region of the middle Columbia basin.

=== Adjacent counties ===
- Spokane County, Washington – northwest
- Kootenai County – north
- Shoshone County – east
- Latah County – south
- Whitman County, Washington – southwest

=== Major highways ===
- – US 95
- – SH-3
- – SH-5
- – SH-6
- – SH-58
- – SH-60

=== National protected area ===
- St. Joe National Forest (part)

=== State protected areas ===
- Heyburn State Park
- McCroskey State Park

== Demographics ==
Historical population
Census	Pop.	Note	%±
1920	6,997		—
1930	6,371		−8.9%
1940	7,332		15.1%
1950	6,173		−15.8%
1960	6,036		−2.2%
1970	6,230		3.2%
1980	8,292		33.1%
1990	7,937		−4.3%
2000	9,171		15.5%
2010	9,285		1.2%
2020	9,530		2.6%
2025 (est.)	10,508	▲	10.3%
US Decennial Census; 1790–1960 1900–1990; 1990–2000 2010–2020

=== Racial and ethnic composition ===
Benewah County, Idaho – Racial and ethnic composition Note: the US Census treats Hispanic/Latino as an ethnic category. This table excludes Latinos from the racial categories and assigns them to a separate category. Hispanics/Latinos may be of any race.
Race / Ethnicity (NH = Non-Hispanic)	Pop 1980	Pop 1990	Pop 2000	Pop 2010	Pop 2020	% 1980	% 1990	% 2000	% 2010	% 2020
White alone (NH)	7,735	7,194	8,055	7,919	7,773	93.28%	90.64%	87.83%	85.29%	81.56%
Black or African American alone (NH)	4	3	11	25	8	0.05%	0.04%	0.12%	0.27%	0.08%
Native American or Alaska Native alone (NH)	442	583	788	765	796	5.33%	7.35%	8.59%	8.24%	8.35%
Asian alone (NH)	22	28	13	27	30	0.27%	0.35%	0.14%	0.29%	0.31%
Native Hawaiian or Pacific Islander alone (NH)	x	x	5	6	15	x	x	0.05%	0.06%	0.16%
Other race alone (NH)	16	5	2	4	70	0.19%	0.06%	0.02%	0.04%	0.73%
Mixed race or Multiracial (NH)	x	x	155	304	584	x	x	1.69%	3.27%	6.13%
Hispanic or Latino (any race)	73	124	142	235	254	0.88%	1.56%	1.55%	2.53%	2.67%
Total	8,292	7,937	9,171	9,285	9,530	100.00%	100.00%	100.00%	100.00%	100.00%

=== 2020 census ===
As of the 2020 census, the county had a population of 9,530. The median age was 47.5 years. 22.0% of residents were under the age of 18 and 25.1% of residents were 65 years of age or older. For every 100 females there were 103.0 males, and for every 100 females age 18 and over there were 101.4 males age 18 and over.

The racial makeup of the county was 82.4% White, 0.1% Black or African American, 8.7% American Indian and Alaska Native, 0.4% Asian, 0.2% Native Hawaiian and Pacific Islander, 1.2% from some other race, and 7.1% from two or more races. Hispanic or Latino residents of any race comprised 2.7% of the population.

0.0% of residents lived in urban areas, while 100.0% lived in rural areas.

There were 3,875 households in the county, of which 27.0% had children under the age of 18 living with them and 21.3% had a female householder with no spouse or partner present. About 25.8% of all households were made up of individuals and 14.0% had someone living alone who was 65 years of age or older.

There were 4,628 housing units, of which 16.3% were vacant. Among occupied housing units, 77.6% were owner-occupied and 22.4% were renter-occupied. The homeowner vacancy rate was 1.2% and the rental vacancy rate was 8.4%.

=== 2010 census ===
As of the 2010 United States census, there were 9,285 people, 3,837 households, and 2,571 families in the county. The population density was 12.0 inhabitants per square mile (4.6/km^{2}). There were 4,629 housing units at an average density of 6.0 per square mile (2.3/km^{2}). The racial makeup of the county was 86.6% white, 8.7% Native American, 0.3% black or African American, 0.3% Asian, 0.1% Pacific islander, 0.5% from other races, and 3.6% from two or more races. Those of Hispanic or Latino origin made up 2.5% of the population. In terms of European ancestry, 23.7% were German, 17.5% were Irish, 14.6% were English, 7.1% were Norwegian, and 3.4% were American.

Of the 3,837 households, 29.0% had children under the age of 18 living with them, 52.8% were married couples living together, 9.3% had a female householder with no husband present, 33.0% were non-families, and 27.3% of all households were made up of individuals. The average household size was 2.40 and the average family size was 2.90. The median age was 44.8 years.

The median income for a household in the county was $37,500 and the median income for a family was $41,759. Males had a median income of $37,214 versus $22,348 for females. The per capita income for the county was $18,312. About 11.2% of families and 15.2% of the population were below the poverty line, including 21.6% of those under age 18 and 5.6% of those age 65 or over.

=== 2000 census ===
As of the 2000 United States census, there were 9,171 people, 3,580 households, and 2,538 families in the county. The population density was 12 people per square mile (4.6 people/km^{2}). There were 4,238 housing units at an average density of 6 per square mile (2.3/km^{2}). The racial makeup of the county was 88.66% White, 0.12% Black or African American, 8.94% Native American, 0.15% Asian, 0.05% Pacific Islander, 0.25% from other races, and 1.82% from two or more races. 1.55% of the population were Hispanic or Latino of any race. 26.6% were of German, 11.7% English, 9.5% American and 8.6% Irish ancestry.

There were 3,580 households, out of which 31.30% had children under the age of 18 living with them, 58.40% were married couples living together, 7.70% had a female householder with no husband present, and 29.10% were non-families. 24.00% of all households were made up of individuals, and 10.40% had someone living alone who was 65 years of age or older. The average household size was 2.52 and the average family size was 2.99.

The county population contained 26.90% under the age of 18, 6.80% from 18 to 24, 25.40% from 25 to 44, 26.60% from 45 to 64, and 14.20% who were 65 years of age or older. The median age was 39 years. For every 100 females there were 104.00 males. For every 100 females age 18 and over, there were 101.10 males.

The median income for a household in the county was $31,517, and the median income for a family was $36,000. Males had a median income of $35,097 versus $20,288 for females. The per capita income for the county was $15,285. About 10.50% of families and 14.10% of the population were below the poverty line, including 18.20% of those under age 18 and 9.70% of those age 65 or over.

== Politics ==
Benewah County voters tend to vote Republican in the last several decades. In only two national elections since 1968 has the county selected the Democratic Party candidate (as of 2024).

United States presidential election results for Benewah County, Idaho
Year	Republican		Democratic		Third party(ies)	
Year	No.	%	No.	%	No.	%
1916	935	35.06%	1,374	51.52%	358	13.42%
1920	1,351	62.98%	794	37.02%	0	0.00%
1924	1,158	46.98%	318	12.90%	989	40.12%
1928	1,343	57.44%	958	40.98%	37	1.58%
1932	949	35.28%	1,602	59.55%	139	5.17%
1936	897	30.92%	1,906	65.70%	98	3.38%
1940	1,304	40.12%	1,924	59.20%	22	0.68%
1944	1,173	44.38%	1,446	54.71%	24	0.91%
1948	1,038	38.01%	1,590	58.22%	103	3.77%
1952	1,568	52.08%	1,436	47.69%	7	0.23%
1956	1,460	50.31%	1,442	49.69%	0	0.00%
1960	1,274	42.05%	1,756	57.95%	0	0.00%
1964	981	35.33%	1,796	64.67%	0	0.00%
1968	1,125	44.41%	1,160	45.80%	248	9.79%
1972	1,494	55.54%	1,062	39.48%	134	4.98%
1976	1,458	47.58%	1,549	50.55%	57	1.86%
1980	2,111	54.89%	1,361	35.39%	374	9.72%
1984	2,039	57.70%	1,447	40.95%	48	1.36%
1988	1,650	50.96%	1,518	46.88%	70	2.16%
1992	1,223	33.03%	1,270	34.30%	1,210	32.68%
1996	1,667	42.54%	1,488	37.97%	764	19.49%
2000	2,606	70.68%	895	24.27%	186	5.04%
2004	2,823	69.70%	1,148	28.35%	79	1.95%
2008	2,646	63.54%	1,407	33.79%	111	2.67%
2012	2,596	66.82%	1,164	29.96%	125	3.22%
2016	3,103	74.15%	770	18.40%	312	7.46%
2020	3,878	77.95%	977	19.64%	120	2.41%
2024	4,094	79.57%	935	18.17%	116	2.25%

== Communities ==
=== Cities ===
- Plummer
- St. Maries
- Tensed

=== Census-designated places ===
- De Smet
- Fernwood
- Parkline

=== Unincorporated communities ===
- Alder Creek
- Benewah
- Cardwell
- Chatcolet
- Emida
- Flat Creek
- Hawleys Landing
- Lotus
- Mashburn
- Meadowhurst
- Miltown
- Mowry
- North South Ski Bowl
- Omega
- Pedee
- Plummer Junction
- Ramsdell
- Renfrew
- Riverdale
- Rocky Point
- Rover
- Saint Joe
- Sanders
- Santa
- Silvertip Landing
- Tyson Creek Station
- Wayland
- Willard

== Education ==
School districts include:

- Kootenai Joint School District 274
- Plummer-Worley Joint School District 44
- St. Maries Joint School District 41

It is in the catchment area, but not the taxation zone, for North Idaho College.

== Images ==
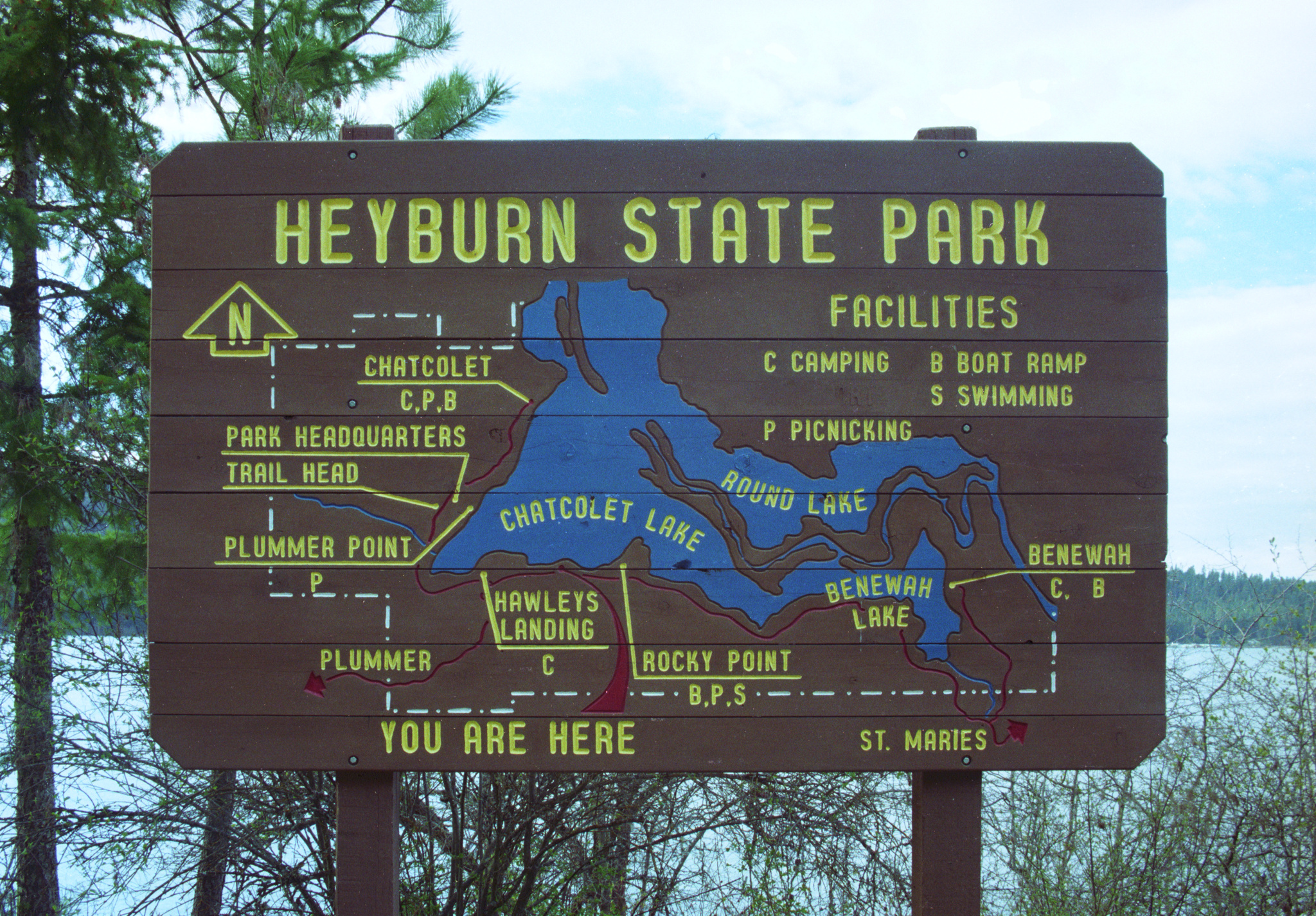
Heyburn State Park information sign

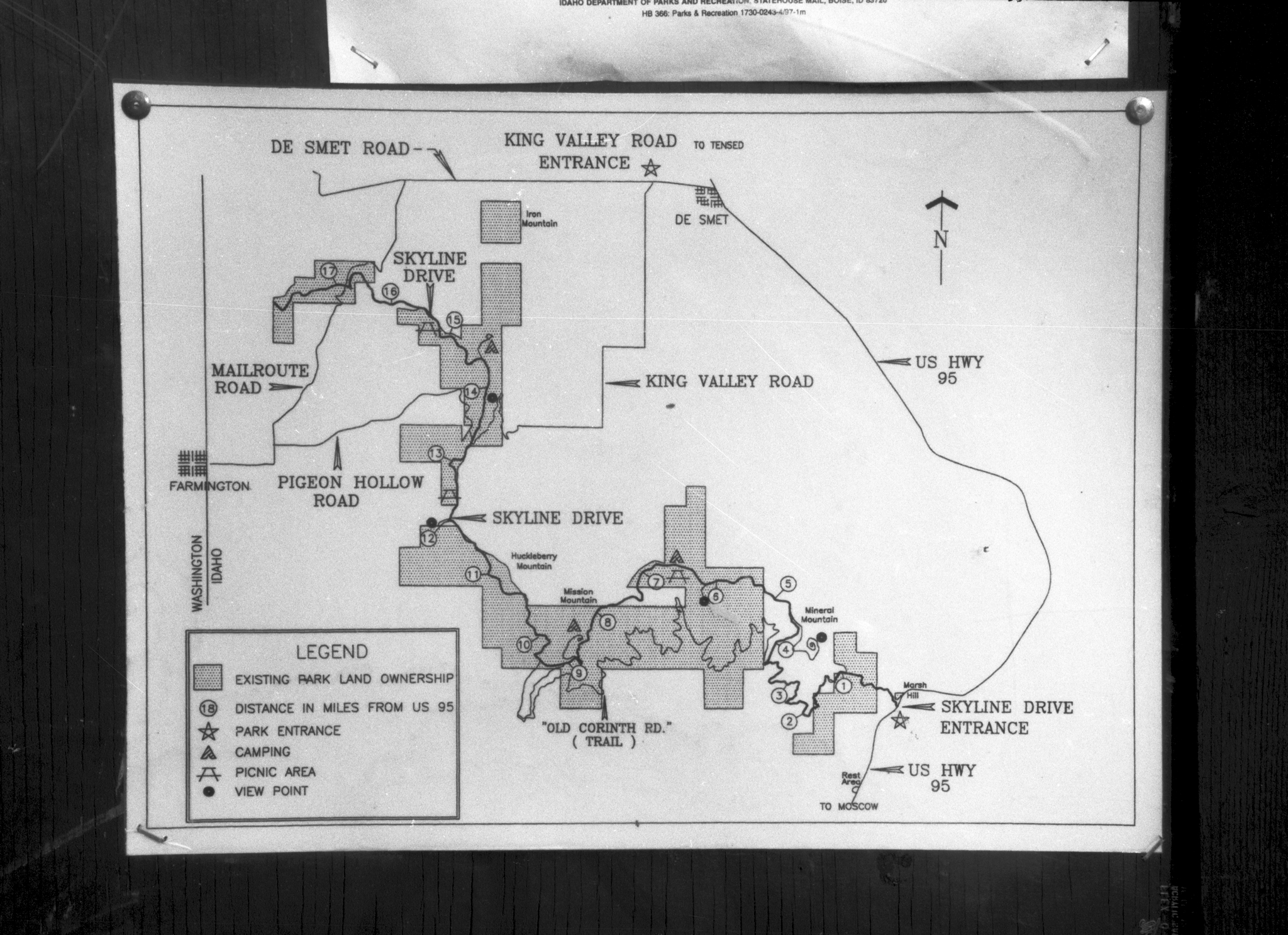
Map of McCroskey State Park

== See also ==
- National Register of Historic Places listings in Benewah County, Idaho
