= Unity, Idaho =

Unincorporated community in Cassia County, Idaho, United States

- Unincorporated community
- Location in Idaho Location in the United States
- Coordinates: 42°31′7″N 113°44′36″W
- Country: United States
- State: Idaho
- County: Cassia
- Elevation: 4,196 ft (1,279 m)
- Time zone: UTC-7 (Mountain (MST))
  - Summer (DST): UTC-6 (MDT)
- ZIP code: 83318
- Area codes: 208, 986
- GNIS feature ID: 398291

Unity is an unincorporated community along the Snake River in Cassia County, Idaho, United States. The community was founded in 1907-1908 by the Unity Sugar Beet, Land and Irrigation Company, which established operations in the area.

== Geography ==
It is located on Idaho State Highway 81, about 2 miles (3.2 km) east–southeast of Burley.

== History ==
In 1907, the Unity Sugar Beet, Land and Irrigation Company announced plans for the founding of the town of Unity in Spring 1908. The company had raised $7 million in capital for the project, which included the construction of sugar beet factories. "Its first work will be to establish the town of Unity and colonize the land near-by," according to an article in the Owyhee Nugget, a newspaper in Silver City, Idaho. A company official, B.E. Corbin, announced plans for an irrigation reservoir at the new Unity townsite. Announcements of the new town and associated beet factories were published in Louisiana that year.

By the 1920s, Unity was regarded as a community. Pioneer Day, a Mormon traditional holiday, was celebrated in Unity in 1922. By 1930, the Unity precinct had 615 residents.

In 1917, the Unity Light and Power Company was founded. Originally a stock company, the company was reorganized as a cooperative on May 20, 1921. By 1947, there were 375 co-op members and 90 miles (140 km) miles of transmission lines. The company became the Burley and Unity Light and Power Company in 1985, and the United Electric Co-op in 1998.

Unity was the site of the Unity Ward Church of the Church of Jesus Christ of Latter-Day Saints. Church organizations included the Young Men's Mutual Improvement Association (YMMIA) and Young Ladies' Mutual Improvement Association (YLMIA), which operated circa 1919. The church was damaged by arson in July 1976; the same arsonist was believed to have caused the Emerson Grange and Claremont Grange Hall fires. 150 church members removed articles from the building while firefighters from Declo battled the blaze.
