= Wickahoney, Idaho =

- Ghost town
- Location within Idaho Location within the United States
- Coordinates: 42°27′36″N 115°59′00″W
- Country: United States
- State: Idaho
- County: Owyhee
- Elevation: 5,161 ft (1,573 m)
- Time zone: UTC-7 (Mountain (MST))
  - Summer (DST): UTC-6 (MDT)
- Area codes: 208, 986
- GNIS feature ID: 397310

Wickahoney is a ghost town in Owyhee County, Idaho, United States. The town is located in a remote part of southern Owyhee County. It once had its own post office, which doubled as a stagecoach stop on the route from Mountain Home, Idaho to Mountain City, Nevada; the now-abandoned Wickahoney Post Office and Stage Station is listed on the National Register of Historic Places.
