= Lakeview, South Dakota =

Unincorporated community in South Dakota, U.S.

Coordinates: 43°06′13″N 100°44′54″W

Lakeview is an unincorporated community in Todd County, in the U.S. state of South Dakota.

== History ==
A post office called Lakeview was established in 1913, and remained in operation until 1955. The community was so named for a lake (since drained) near the town site.
