= Swanlake, Idaho =

Unincorporated community in the state of Idaho, United States

- Unincorporated community
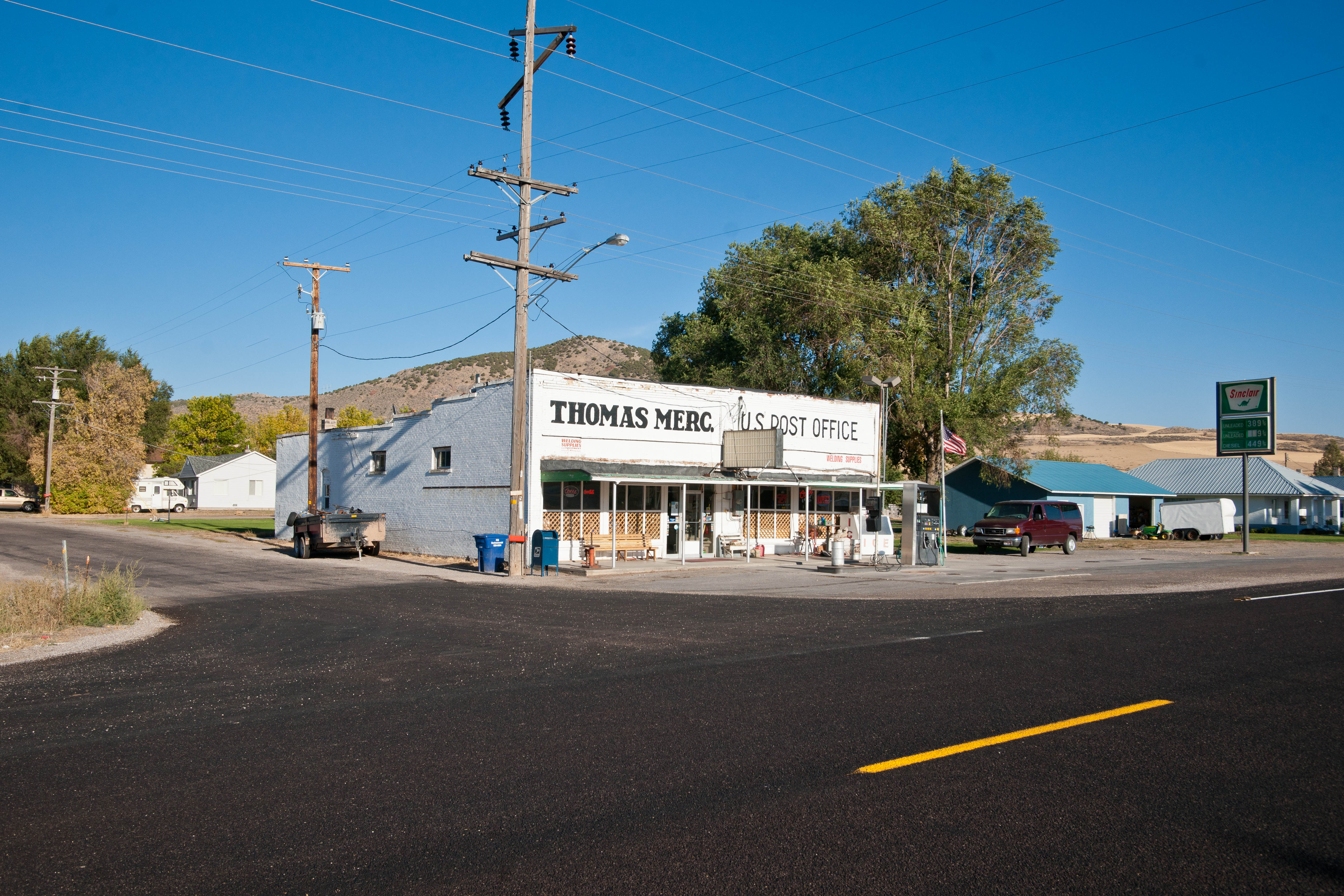
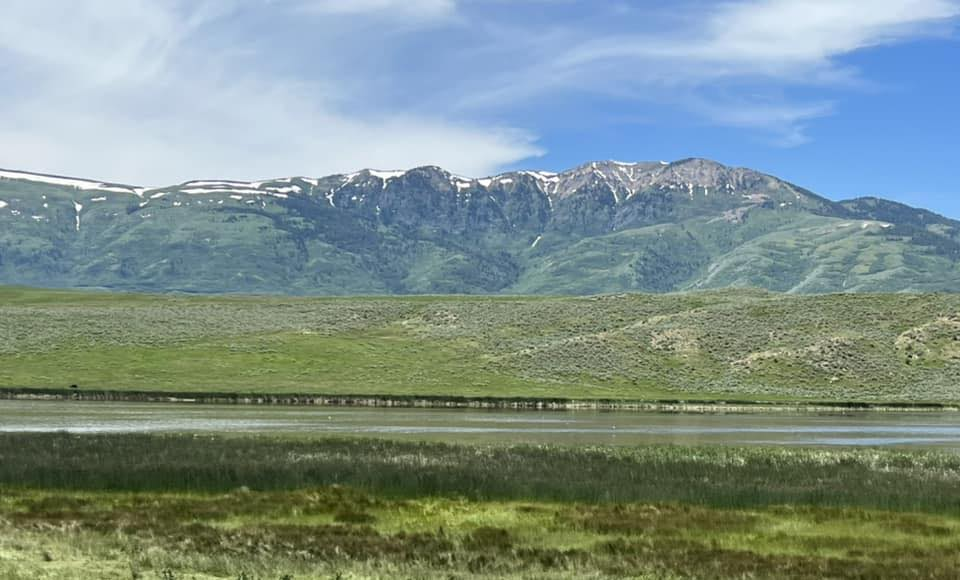
- Swanlake Post Office, September 2012

- Location within Idaho Location within the United States
- Coordinates: 42°18′50″N 112°00′06″W
- Country: United States
- State: Idaho
- County: Bannock
- Elevation: 4,784 ft (1,458 m)

Population (2010)
  - Total: 93
- Time zone: UTC-7 (Mountain (MST))
  - Summer (DST): UTC-6 (MDT)
- ZIP code: 83281
- Area codes: 208 and 986
- GNIS feature ID: 391736

Swanlake is an unincorporated community in Bannock County, Idaho, United States. Swanlake is 10 miles (16 km) southeast of Downey. Swanlake has a post office with ZIP code 83281.

== Demographics ==
=== 2010 census ===
As of the census of 2010, there were 93 people, 36 households, and 29 families residing in the city. The racial makeup of the city was 100% White. Hispanic or Latino of any race were 2.2% of the population.

The median age in the city was 44.3 years. 31.2% of residents were under the age of 19; 0.0% were between the ages of 20 and 24; 20.5% were from 25 to 44; 28% were from 45 to 64; and 20.4% were 65 years of age or older. The gender makeup of the city was 51.6% male and 48.4% female.
