= Lost River, Idaho =

- City
- Location in Custer County and the state of Idaho
- Coordinates: 43°43′18″N 113°32′42″W
- Country: United States
- State: Idaho
- County: Custer

Area
  - Total: 8.70 sq mi (22.53 km^{2})
  - Land: 8.69 sq mi (22.51 km^{2})
  - Water: 0.012 sq mi (0.03 km^{2})
- Elevation: 6,368 ft (1,941 m)

Population (2020)
  - Total: 42
  - Density: 7.8/sq mi (3/km^{2})
- Time zone: UTC-7 (Mountain (MST))
  - Summer (DST): UTC-6 (MDT)
- Area code: 208
- FIPS code: 16-47890
- GNIS feature ID: 2410881

Lost River is a city in Custer County, Idaho, United States. The population was 42 persons at the 2020 census.

== Geography ==
According to the United States Census Bureau, the city has a total area of 8.70 square miles (22.53 km^{2}), of which, 8.69 square miles (22.51 km^{2}) is land and 0.01 square miles (0.03 km^{2}) is water.

Its name refers to its location near the Big Lost River.

== Demographics ==
Historical population
Census	Pop.	Note	%±
1950	37		—
1960	58		56.8%
1970	40		−31.0%
1980	28		−30.0%
1990	29		3.6%
2000	26		−10.3%
2010	68		161.5%
2020	42		−38.2%
U.S. Decennial Census

=== 2010 census ===
As of the census of 2010, there were 68 people, 15 households, and 11 families residing in the city. The population density was 7.8 inhabitants per square mile (3.0/km^{2}). There were 30 housing units at an average density of 3.5 per square mile (1.4/km^{2}). The racial makeup of the city was 95.6% White, 2.9% African American, and 1.5% from two or more races. Hispanic or Latino of any race were 11.8% of the population.

There were 15 households, of which 33.3% had children under the age of 18 living with them, 73.3% were married couples living together, and 26.7% were non-families. 13.3% of all households were made up of individuals, and 6.7% had someone living alone who was 65 years of age or older. The average household size was 4.53 and the average family size was 3.36.

The median age in the city was 47.5 years. 11.8% of residents were under the age of 18; 7.4% were between the ages of 18 and 24; 23.5% were from 25 to 44; 47.1% were from 45 to 64, and 10.3% were 65 years of age or older. The gender makeup of the city was 63.2% male and 36.8% female.

=== 2000 census ===
As of the census of 2000, there were 26 people, 8 households, and 6 families residing in the city. The population density was 3.0 people per square mile (1.2 people/km^{2}). There were 15 housing units at an average density of 1.7 per square mile (0.66/km^{2}). The racial makeup of the city was 84.62% White, 11.54% from other races, and 3.85% from two or more races. Hispanic or Latino of any race were 30.77% of the population.

There were 8 households, out of which 50.0% had children under the age of 18 living with them, 75.0% were married couples living together, and 25.0% were non-families. 12.5% of all households were made up of individuals, and none had someone living alone who was 65 years of age or older. The average household size was 3.25 and the average family size was 3.83.

In the city, the population was spread out, with 38.5% under the age of 18, 7.7% from 18 to 24, 34.6% from 25 to 44, 11.5% from 45 to 64, and 7.7% who were 65 years of age or older. The median age was 28 years. For every 100 females, there were 116.7 males. For every 100 females age 18 and over, there were 166.7 males.

The median income for a household in the city was $31,667, and the median income for a family was $66,250. Males had a median income of $29,167 versus $21,250 for females. The per capita income for the city was $14,534. There were no families and 6.9% of the population living below the poverty line, including no under eighteens and none of those over 64.
