= View, Idaho =

Unincorporated community in Cassia County, Idaho, United States

- Unincorporated community
- Location in Idaho Location in the United States
- Coordinates: 42°27′3″N 113°41′50″W
- Country: United States
- State: Idaho
- County: Cassia
- Elevation: 4,232 ft (1,290 m)
- Time zone: UTC-7 (Mountain (MST))
  - Summer (DST): UTC-6 (MDT)
- ZIP code: 83318
- Area codes: 208, 986
- GNIS feature ID: 398305

View is an unincorporated community in Cassia County, Idaho, United States, about 7.5 miles (12.1 km) southeast of Burley.
