= Olson City, Idaho =

Industrial park in Boise, Idaho, United States

Coordinates: 43.5894°N 116.1614°W

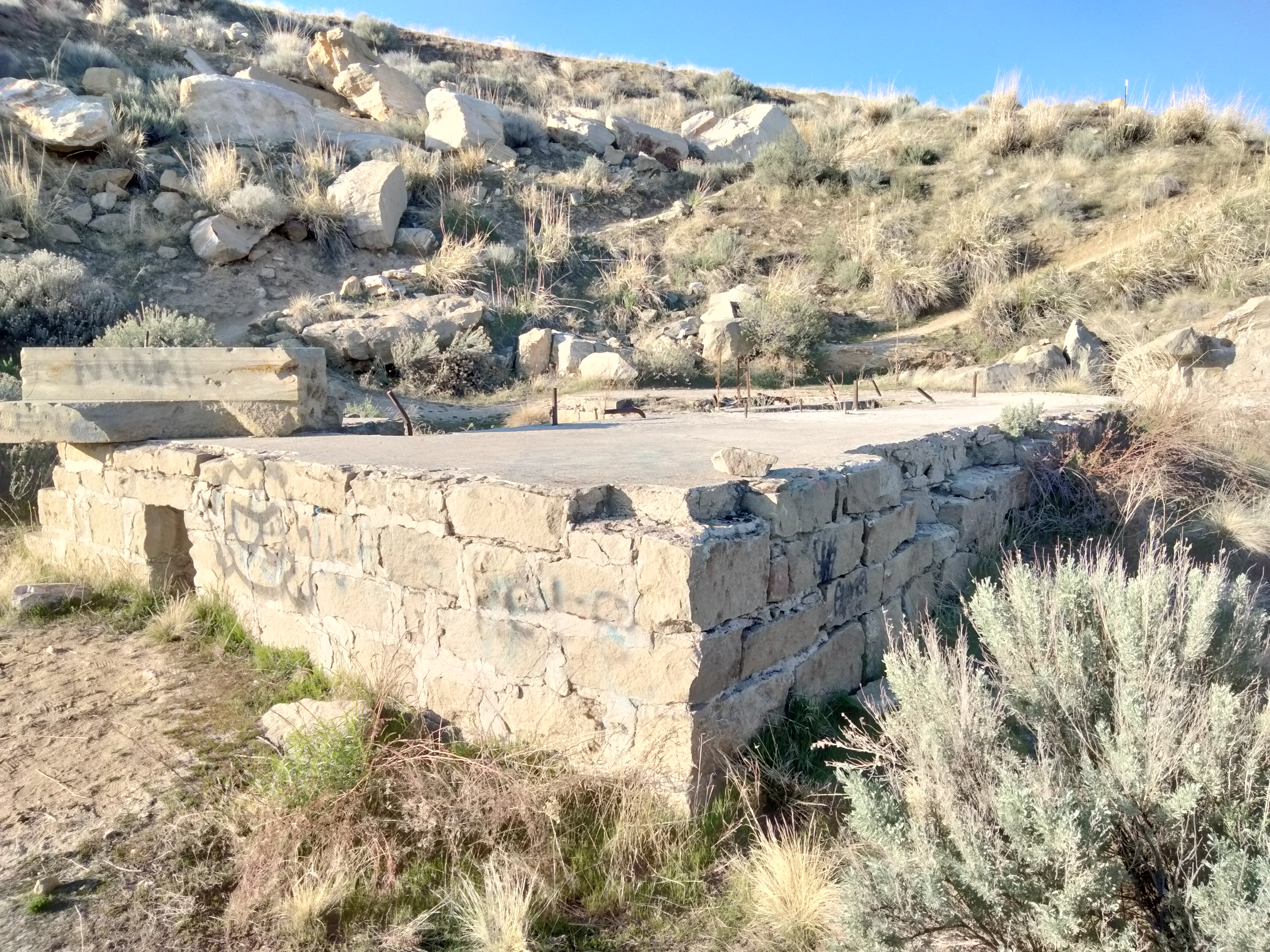
A ruin of a small sandstone building on #14 Tram Trail

The quarry is a federally regulated mine. Note the red No Trespassing sign.

Olson City, Idaho was an early- and mid-20th century industrial park in southeast Boise named after L. G. Olson, president and general manager of Olson Manufacturing Co. The firm, founded in Ontario, Oregon 1910 but based in Boise since 1920, established a new manufacturing plant near the old sandstone quarry southeast of the Idaho State Penitentiary and Table Rock, 1 mi (1.6 km) east of the famous (and also long since defunct) Nanatorium, on the road to Arrowrock Dam. Situated by the Boise River, the company manufactured and serviced a wide range of industrial goods, including mining machinery, steelworks, oil equipment, irrigation infrastructure, storage tanks, ditchers, and the like.

In 1940, when the Olson Company acquired the holdings of the venerable Boise Stone Company, a workman climbed up a chimney and painted in red paint "Olson City"; the campus and the company thus became conterminous.

Not a company town, the Idaho Sunday Statesman often covered Olson City: around-the-clock war production in 1943 (which necessitated an additional railway spur line), Morrison-Knudsen's purchase of a controlling interest in (the company) in late 1943, and the employment of "feminine steelworkers" in May 1945. In November 1945 the Olson Co. took out a full-page ad in the statesman detailing the war material it had produced.

On December 6, 1946 it was announced that the Olson Manufacturing Co. had bought the entire inventory and part of the machinery of Idaho Steel Products Company, which had been in existence for three years.

The company fabricated steel lining for the Lucky Peak Dam diversion tunnel in 1950.

The Omaha, Nebraska firm Gate City Steel bought "Olson City" sometime prior to January 1961, and by May 1962 the putative city, once known throughout the Northwest, was as a distinct entity was a matter of remembrance, having been subsumed by Bannock Steel Group. Little trace of it remains, to the extent that on both many older and even contemporary maps part of the area is labeled "Vernon" on the area of a subdivision called Warm Springs Village. Several of the Ridge to Rivers foothill hiking trails thread the area, including the 3,828 ft (1.167 km) #14 Tram Trail.
