= Lakeview, Idaho =

Location of Lakeview on a map.

Lakeview is an unincorporated community in Bonner County, Idaho, United States.

== Location ==
Lakeview is located near the southern tip of Lake Pend Oreille, in the very bottom of Bonner County. The community of Bayview is located just 5 miles west, where Highway 54 leads to Route 95, connecting Lakeview to larger cities like Sandpoint in the north, and Coeur d'Alene to the south.

== History ==
Topographic map of the Lakeview quadrangle by the United States Department of the Interior geological survey.

In 1881, the Cannon and Gray Lime Company was established just north of the community, which harvested limestone from the hillsides. The first traces of silver in the area was found at this time, and many prospectors moved to the area. Lakeview became a bustling mining town by 1890.

== Mining ==
Several mines are still operating in the area today, all are part of the Lakeview mining district, which is located about 30 miles north of the Coeur d'Alene mining district, and borders the Pend Oreille Mining District to the north. An estimate of $2,000,000 in silver, lead, zinc, and silica were produced by the district.
