= Parkline, Idaho =

Census-designated place in Benewah County, Idaho, United States

- Census-designated place
- Location of Parkline in Benewah County, Idaho.
- Coordinates: 47°20′19″N 116°41′38″W
- Country: United States
- State: Idaho
- County: Benewah

Area
  - Total: 0.494 sq mi (1.28 km^{2})
  - Land: 0.494 sq mi (1.28 km^{2})
  - Water: 0.0 sq mi (0 km^{2})
- Elevation: 2,310 ft (700 m)

Population (2020)
  - Total: 60
  - Density: 120/sq mi (47/km^{2})
- Time zone: UTC-8 (Pacific (PST))
  - Summer (DST): UTC-7 (PDT)
- Area codes: 208, 986
- FIPS code: 16-60880
- GNIS feature ID: 2611709

Parkline is a census-designated place on the Coeur d'Alene Reservation in Benewah County, Idaho, United States. The population was 60 at the 2020 census. Parkline was a city until it disincorporated in 2001.

== Geography ==
According to the United States Census Bureau, the city had a total area of 0.5 square miles (1.3 km^{2}), all of it land.

== Demographics ==
Historical population
Census	Pop.	Note	%±
2000	65		—
2010	80		23.1%
2020	60		−25.0%
U.S. Decennial Census

As of the census of 2000, there were 65 people, 31 households, and 22 families residing in the city. The population density was 344.3 inhabitants per square mile (132.9/km^{2}). There were 38 housing units at an average density of 201.3 units per square mile (77.7 units/km^{2}). The racial makeup of the city was 93.85% White, 1.54% Native American, 3.08% from other races, and 1.54% from two or more races. Hispanic or Latino of any race were 3.08% of the population.

There were 31 households, out of which 22.6% had children under the age of 18 living with them, 61.3% were married couples living together, 6.5% had a female householder with no husband present, and 29.0% were non-families. 29.0% of all households were made up of individuals, and 9.7% had someone living alone who was 65 years of age or older. The average household size was 2.10 and the average family size was 2.55.

In the city the population was spread out, with 18.5% under the age of 18, 12.3% from 18 to 24, 20.0% from 25 to 44, 24.6% from 45 to 64, and 24.6% who were 65 years of age or older. The median age was 42 years. For every 100 females, there were 97.0 males. For every 100 females age 18 and over, there were 130.4 males.

The median income for a household in the city was $40,000, and the median income for a family was $40,000. Males had a median income of $51,250 versus $14,583 for females. The per capita income for the city was $31,309. There were 11.5% of families and 8.9% of the population living below the poverty line, including 11.1% of under eighteens and none of those over 64.

== See also ==
- List of census-designated places in Idaho
