= Lakeview Middle School =

Lakeview Middle School may refer to:

- Lakeview Middle School (Greenville, South Carolina). See Greenville County School District.
- Lakeview Middle School (Kansas City, Missouri). See Park Hill School District.
- Lakeview Middle School (Watsonville, California). See Pajaro Valley Unified School District.
- Lakeview Middle School (Winter Garden, Florida)
