= Wapello, Idaho =

Unincorporated community in Idaho, United States

Wapallo, Idaho
- Unincorporated community
- Location in Idaho Location in the United States
- Coordinates: 43°14′49″N 112°15′25″W
- Country: United States
- State: Idaho
- County: Bingham
- Elevation: 4,547 ft (1,386 m)
- Time zone: UTC-7 (Mountain (MST))
  - Summer (DST): UTC-6 (MDT)
- Area codes: 208, 986
- GNIS feature ID: 397298

Wapello is an unincorporated community in Bingham County, Idaho, United States.

== History ==
A post office called Wapello was established in 1904, and remained in operation until 1908. The community was named after Wapello, an Indian chieftain. Idaho Falls, Idaho, is 35 miles (56 km) away.

The population of Wapello has remained steady, with about 12,000 residents in 2010. Politically similar to other rural areas of Bingham County, Wapello voting records indicate approximately three registered Republicans for every registered Democrat.
