= Plummer, Idaho =

- City
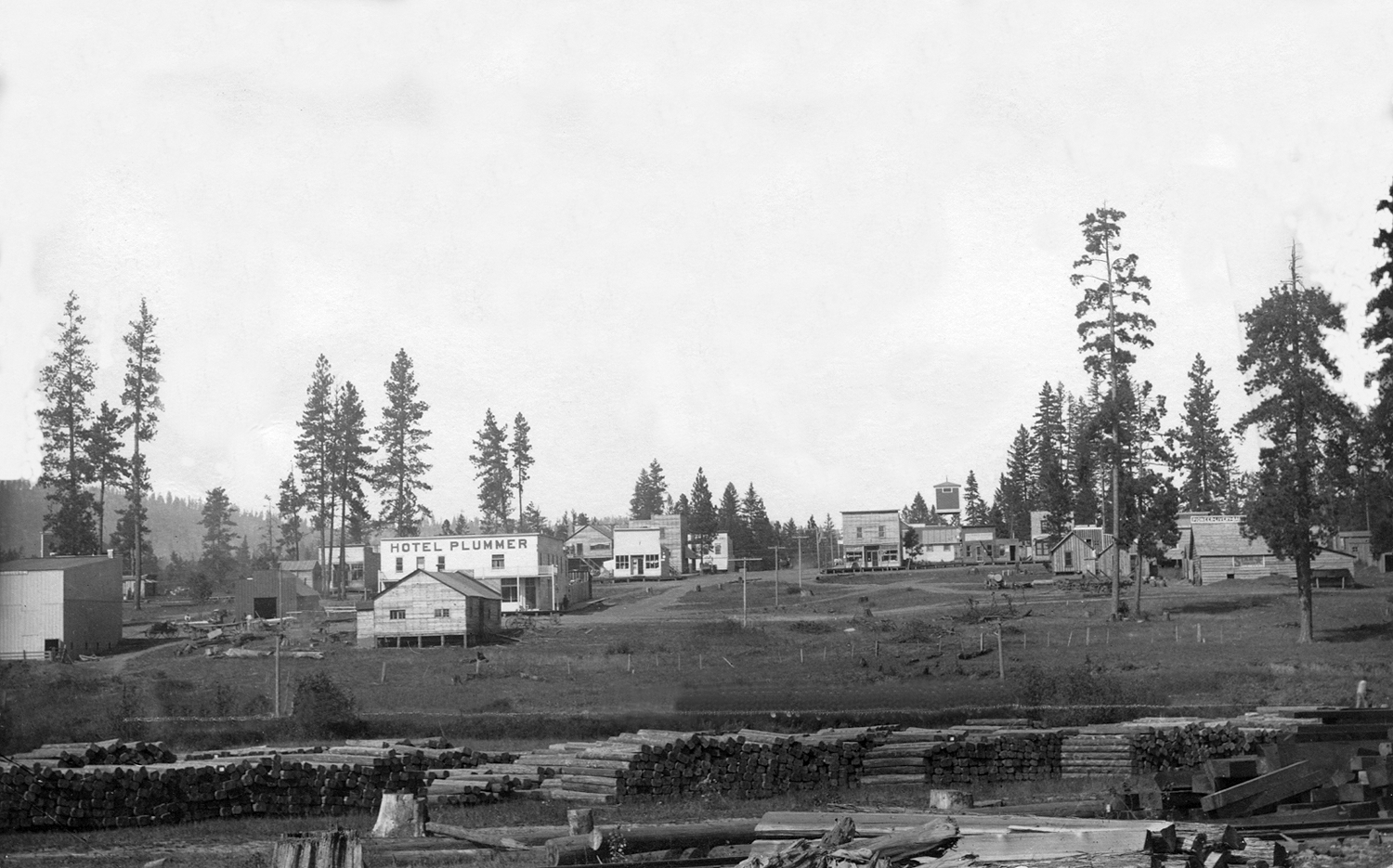
- Plummer, circa 1912

- Location of Plummer in Benewah County, Idaho.
- Coordinates: 47°19′48″N 116°52′45″W
- Country: United States
- State: Idaho
- County: Benewah

Area
  - Total: 1.26 sq mi (3.27 km^{2})
  - Land: 1.26 sq mi (3.27 km^{2})
  - Water: 0 sq mi (0.00 km^{2})
- Elevation: 2,743 ft (836 m)

Population (2020)
  - Total: 1,015
  - Density: 804/sq mi (310/km^{2})
- Time zone: UTC-8 (Pacific (PST))
  - Summer (DST): UTC-7 (PDT)
- ZIP code: 83851
- Area codes: 208, 986
- FIPS code: 16-63910
- GNIS feature ID: 2411445
- Website: www.cityofplummer.org

Plummer is a city in Benewah County, Idaho, United States. The population was 1,015 at the 2020 census, down from 1,044 in 2010. It is the largest city within the Coeur d'Alene Reservation, and is accessed by U.S. Route 95, the state's primary north–south highway.

== History ==
The city's first church was built in 1912.

== Geography ==
According to the United States Census Bureau, the city has a total area of 1.25 square miles (3.24 km^{2}), all of it land.

=== Climate ===
Plummer has a dry-summer humid continental climate (Dsb) according to the Köppen climate classification system.

Climate data for Plummer (1950-2012)
Month	Jan	Feb	Mar	Apr	May	Jun	Jul	Aug	Sep	Oct	Nov	Dec	Year
Record high °F (°C)	56 (13)	62 (17)	70 (21)	78 (26)	92 (33)	95 (35)	101 (38)	100 (38)	97 (36)	86 (30)	65 (18)	57 (14)	101 (38)
Mean daily maximum °F (°C)	35.9 (2.2)	41.1 (5.1)	47.4 (8.6)	55.4 (13.0)	64 (18)	70 (21)	81.5 (27.5)	81.5 (27.5)	73.4 (23.0)	56.7 (13.7)	43 (6)	34.1 (1.2)	57 (14)
Mean daily minimum °F (°C)	24.4 (−4.2)	26.6 (−3.0)	30.1 (−1.1)	34.2 (1.2)	38.5 (3.6)	44.4 (6.9)	50.6 (10.3)	50 (10)	43.3 (6.3)	34.4 (1.3)	30.6 (−0.8)	24.5 (−4.2)	36 (2)
Record low °F (°C)	−15 (−26)	−15 (−26)	0 (−18)	17 (−8)	25 (−4)	28 (−2)	36 (2)	31 (−1)	27 (−3)	9 (−13)	−6 (−21)	−8 (−22)	−15 (−26)
Average precipitation inches (mm)	3.17 (81)	2.95 (75)	2.27 (58)	1.93 (49)	2.5 (64)	1.62 (41)	0.61 (15)	0.71 (18)	0.74 (19)	2.17 (55)	3.92 (100)	4.11 (104)	26.7 (680)
Average snowfall inches (cm)	5.5 (14)	1.8 (4.6)	1.1 (2.8)	0 (0)	0.2 (0.51)	0 (0)	0 (0)	0 (0)	0 (0)	0 (0)	0.9 (2.3)	5 (13)	14.4 (37)
Average precipitation days	13	12	10	10	9	8	3	3	3	8	16	14	109

== Parks and recreation ==
The Trail of the Coeur d'Alenes is a 73-mile (117 km) rail trail that runs between Plummer and Mullan and passes through Heyburn State Park to the east, Harrison, and Cataldo along the way.

== Demographics ==
Historical population
Census	Pop.	Note	%±
1920	450		—
1930	346		−23.1%
1940	399		15.3%
1950	395		−1.0%
1960	344		−12.9%
1970	443		28.8%
1980	634		43.1%
1990	804		26.8%
2000	990		23.1%
2010	1,044		5.5%
2020	1,015		−2.8%
U.S. Decennial Census

=== 2020 census ===
As of the 2020 census, Plummer had a population of 1,015. The median age was 37.4 years. 27.3% of residents were under the age of 18 and 16.0% of residents were 65 years of age or older. For every 100 females there were 91.9 males, and for every 100 females age 18 and over there were 90.7 males age 18 and over.

0.0% of residents lived in urban areas, while 100.0% lived in rural areas.

There were 368 households in Plummer, of which 35.3% had children under the age of 18 living in them. Of all households, 38.0% were married-couple households, 22.0% were households with a male householder and no spouse or partner present, and 31.0% were households with a female householder and no spouse or partner present. About 24.4% of all households were made up of individuals and 12.3% had someone living alone who was 65 years of age or older.

There were 398 housing units, of which 7.5% were vacant. The homeowner vacancy rate was 0.0% and the rental vacancy rate was 5.6%.

Racial composition as of the 2020 census
Race	Number	Percent
White	448	44.1%
Black or African American	1	0.1%
American Indian and Alaska Native	436	43.0%
Asian	0	0.0%
Native Hawaiian and Other Pacific Islander	1	0.1%
Some other race	25	2.5%
Two or more races	104	10.2%
Hispanic or Latino (of any race)	50	4.9%

=== 2010 census ===
As of the census of 2010, there were 1,044 people, 374 households, and 261 families residing in the city. The population density was 835.2 inhabitants per square mile (322.5/km^{2}). There were 405 housing units at an average density of 324.0 per square mile (125.1/km^{2}). The racial makeup of the city was 45.7% White, 1.1% African American, 42.7% Native American, 0.1% Pacific Islander, 0.7% from other races, and 9.8% from two or more races. Hispanic or Latino of any race were 8.0% of the population.

There were 374 households, of which 43.3% had children under the age of 18 living with them, 41.7% were married couples living together, 15.2% had a female householder with no husband present, 12.8% had a male householder with no wife present, and 30.2% were non-families. 25.4% of all households were made up of individuals, and 10.9% had someone living alone who was 65 years of age or older. The average household size was 2.78 and the average family size was 3.27.

The median age in the city was 31.4 years. 32.8% of residents were under the age of 18; 9.6% were between the ages of 18 and 24; 22.3% were from 25 to 44; 24.8% were from 45 to 64; and 10.3% were 65 years of age or older. The gender makeup of the city was 51.1% male and 48.9% female.

=== 2000 census ===
As of the census of 2000, there were 990 people, 336 households, and 257 families residing in the city. The population density was 875.2 inhabitants per square mile (337.9/km^{2}). There were 380 housing units at an average density of 335.9 per square mile (129.7/km^{2}). The racial makeup of the city was 55.86% White, 0.71% African American, 39.29% Native American, 0.10% Asian, 0.10% Pacific Islander, 0.81% from other races, and 3.13% from two or more races. Hispanic or Latino of any race were 2.93% of the population.

There were 336 households, out of which 38.4% had children under the age of 18 living with them, 49.4% were married couples living together, 17.3% had a female householder with no husband present, and 23.5% were non-families. 19.6% of all households were made up of individuals, and 8.0% had someone living alone who was 65 years of age or older. The average household size was 2.95 and the average family size was 3.33.

In the city, the population was spread out, with 33.3% under the age of 18, 12.2% from 18 to 24, 26.6% from 25 to 44, 17.6% from 45 to 64, and 10.3% who were 65 years of age or older. The median age was 29 years. For every 100 females, there were 96.8 males. For every 100 females age 18 and over, there were 88.6 males.

The median income for a household in the city was $28,438, and the median income for a family was $31,806. Males had a median income of $26,583 versus $20,357 for females. The per capita income for the city was $10,564. About 17.3% of families and 22.0% of the population were below the poverty line, including 23.8% of those under age 18 and 18.8% of those age 65 or over.

== Notable people ==
- Paulette Jordan, State Representative
