= St. Maries, Idaho =

- City
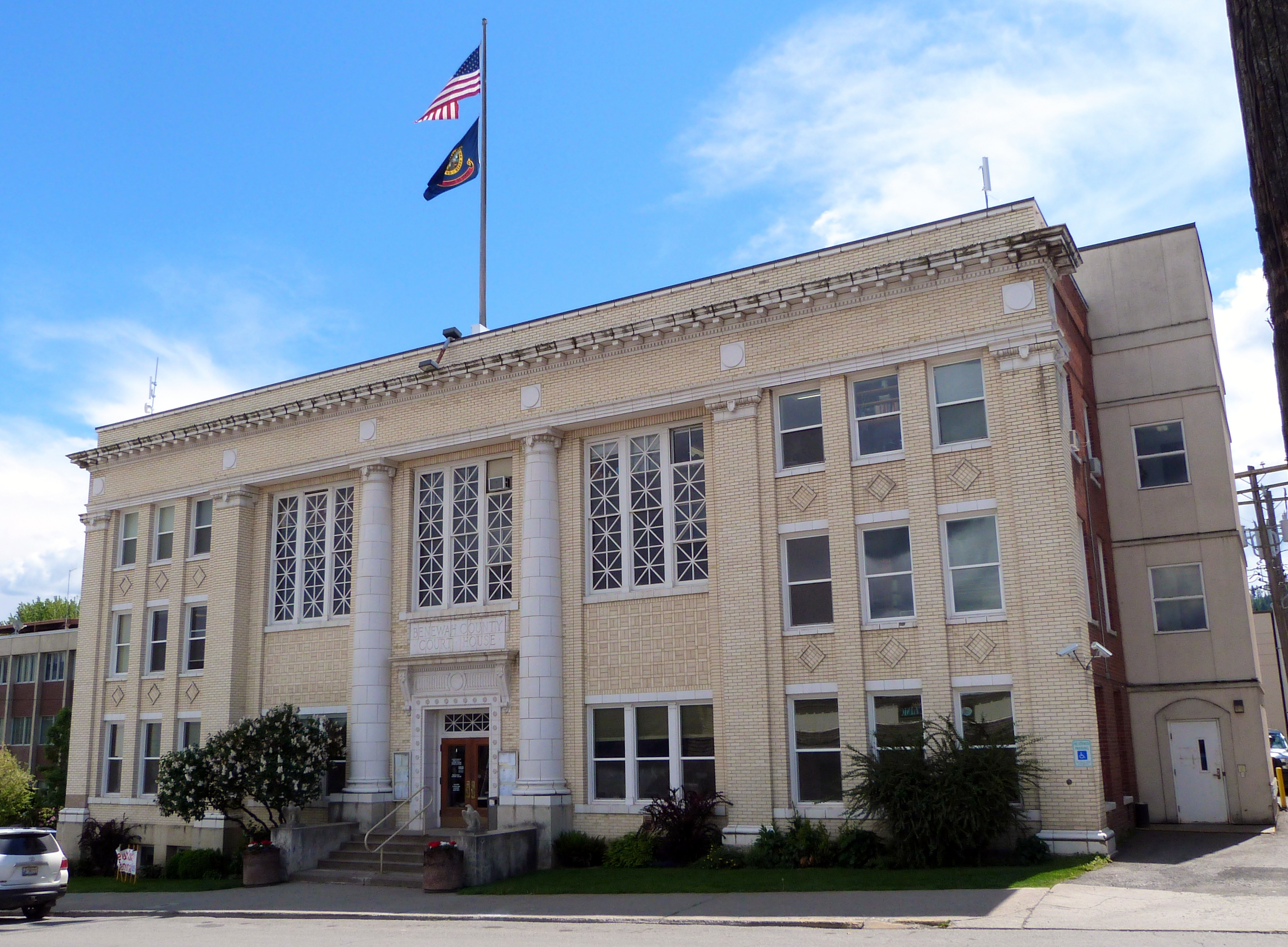
- The Benewah County Courthouse in St. Maries

- Logo

- Location of St. Maries in Benewah County, Idaho.

- Location in the United States
- Coordinates: 47°18′53″N 116°34′20″W
- Country: United States
- State: Idaho
- County: Benewah

Area
  - Total: 1.19 sq mi (3.08 km^{2})
  - Land: 1.19 sq mi (3.08 km^{2})
  - Water: 0 sq mi (0.00 km^{2})
- Elevation: 2,225 ft (678 m)

Population (2020)
  - Total: 2,357
  - Density: 1,980/sq mi (765/km^{2})
- Time zone: UTC-8 (Pacific (PST))
  - Summer (DST): UTC-7 (PDT)
- ZIP Code: 83861
- Area codes: 208, 986
- FIPS code: 16-71470
- GNIS feature ID: 2411762

St. Maries (/seɪnt 'mɛəriz/, saynt MAIR-eez) or Saint Maries is a city in north central Idaho, the largest in rural Benewah County and its county seat. Its population was 2,357 at the 2020 census, down from 2,402 in 2010.

== History ==
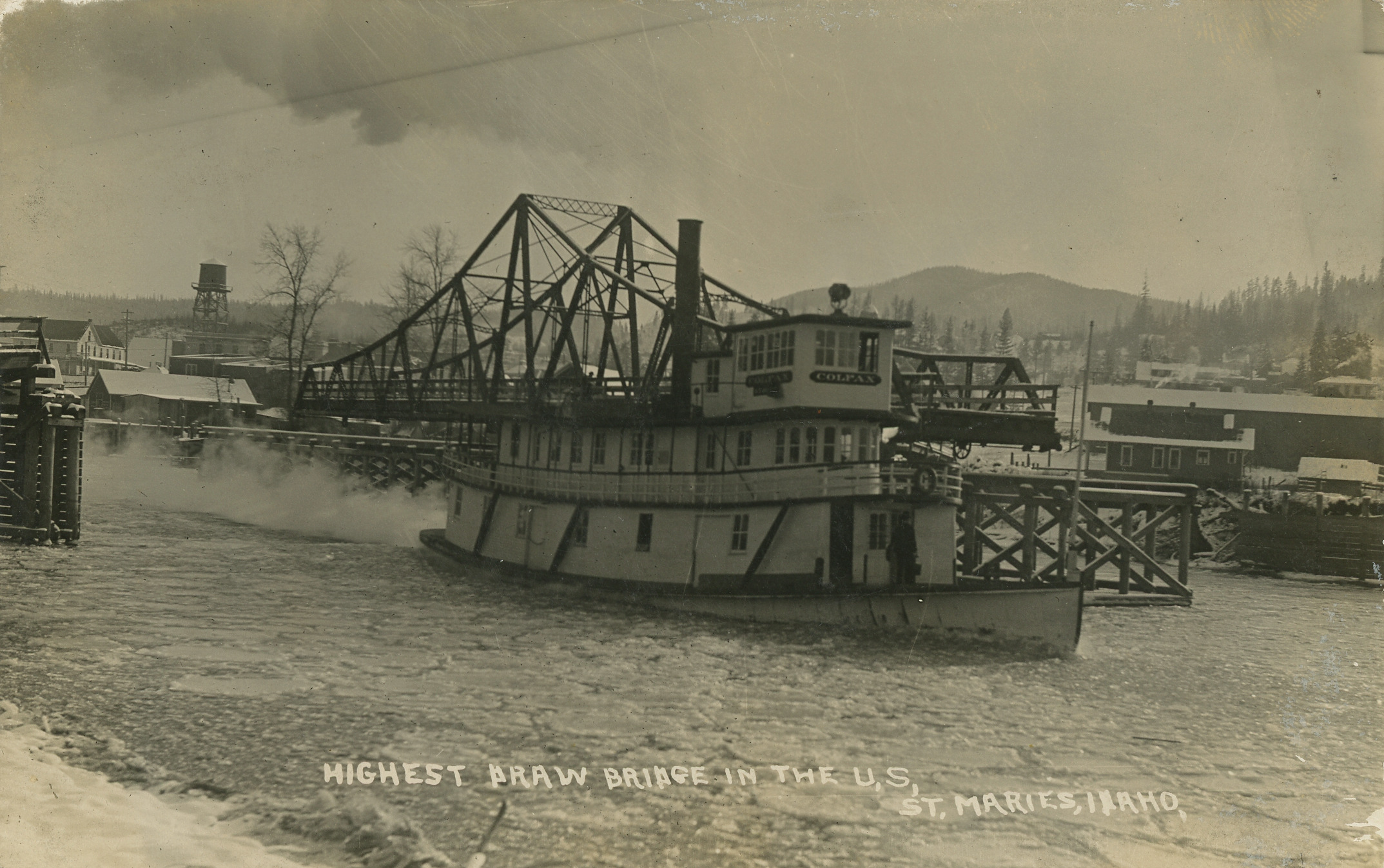
The steamer Colfax departing St. Maries on St. Joe River c. 1910

The townsite was selected by Joseph Fisher, just southwest of the confluence of St. Maries River and St. Joe River, to provide a location for a sawmill, first built in 1889. The rivers and lake systems provided rapid transportation systems for floating logs to the mills and utilizing steamboats to transport finished products to market. From the city, the St. Joe River flows west, through several lakes and into the south end of Lake Coeur d'Alene.

The Pacific Extension of the Chicago, Milwaukee, St. Paul and Pacific Railroad (Milwaukee Road) arrived in 1908. The city was established in 1913 when Benewah County was formed from southern Kootenai County. In 1915 St. Maries was named its county seat.

== Geography ==
According to the United States Census Bureau, the city has a total area of 1.10 square miles (2.85 km^{2}), all of it land. The St. Maries River to the east and the St. Joe River to the north frame the city.

=== Climate ===
According to the Köppen climate classification system, St. Maries has a warm-summer Mediterranean climate (Köppen Csb).

Climate data for St. Maries, Idaho, 1991–2020 normals, extremes 1897–present
Month	Jan	Feb	Mar	Apr	May	Jun	Jul	Aug	Sep	Oct	Nov	Dec	Year
Record high °F (°C)	59 (15)	67 (19)	79 (26)	95 (35)	95 (35)	108 (42)	106 (41)	110 (43)	104 (40)	96 (36)	73 (23)	64 (18)	110 (43)
Mean maximum °F (°C)	49.2 (9.6)	53.7 (12.1)	65.2 (18.4)	76.3 (24.6)	84.7 (29.3)	89.9 (32.2)	96.3 (35.7)	95.7 (35.4)	88.8 (31.6)	75.1 (23.9)	57.9 (14.4)	47.8 (8.8)	98.3 (36.8)
Mean daily maximum °F (°C)	36.7 (2.6)	41.5 (5.3)	49.6 (9.8)	58.0 (14.4)	67.8 (19.9)	73.7 (23.2)	84.3 (29.1)	84.5 (29.2)	74.5 (23.6)	58.7 (14.8)	43.7 (6.5)	35.8 (2.1)	59.1 (15.0)
Daily mean °F (°C)	30.4 (−0.9)	33.4 (0.8)	39.5 (4.2)	46.5 (8.1)	54.9 (12.7)	60.8 (16.0)	68.2 (20.1)	67.8 (19.9)	59.1 (15.1)	47.2 (8.4)	36.6 (2.6)	30.1 (−1.1)	47.9 (8.8)
Mean daily minimum °F (°C)	24.2 (−4.3)	25.2 (−3.8)	29.5 (−1.4)	34.9 (1.6)	42.0 (5.6)	47.8 (8.8)	52.1 (11.2)	51.0 (10.6)	43.7 (6.5)	35.6 (2.0)	29.6 (−1.3)	24.4 (−4.2)	36.7 (2.6)
Mean minimum °F (°C)	6.1 (−14.4)	10.0 (−12.2)	18.4 (−7.6)	26.3 (−3.2)	31.0 (−0.6)	38.4 (3.6)	42.8 (6.0)	41.4 (5.2)	33.0 (0.6)	24.1 (−4.4)	16.1 (−8.8)	8.5 (−13.1)	−0.3 (−17.9)
Record low °F (°C)	−26 (−32)	−23 (−31)	−10 (−23)	8 (−13)	20 (−7)	26 (−3)	30 (−1)	29 (−2)	18 (−8)	9 (−13)	−6 (−21)	−29 (−34)	−29 (−34)
Average precipitation inches (mm)	4.41 (112)	2.99 (76)	3.28 (83)	2.30 (58)	2.43 (62)	2.12 (54)	0.79 (20)	0.74 (19)	1.04 (26)	2.42 (61)	4.15 (105)	4.44 (113)	31.11 (789)
Average snowfall inches (cm)	16.3 (41)	8.6 (22)	5.2 (13)	0.7 (1.8)	0.1 (0.25)	0.0 (0.0)	0.0 (0.0)	0.0 (0.0)	0.0 (0.0)	0.2 (0.51)	6.6 (17)	18.3 (46)	56.0 (142)
Average extreme snow depth inches (cm)	11.8 (30)	9.1 (23)	6.1 (15)	0.3 (0.76)	0.0 (0.0)	0.0 (0.0)	0.0 (0.0)	0.0 (0.0)	0.0 (0.0)	0.1 (0.25)	3.5 (8.9)	9.0 (23)	16.5 (42)
Average precipitation days (≥ 0.01 in)	16.1	12.9	14.2	12.9	12.4	10.7	5.0	4.1	6.3	11.2	15.0	15.6	136.4
Average snowy days (≥ 0.1 in)	8.9	5.7	3.7	0.9	0.2	0.0	0.0	0.0	0.0	0.1	3.5	8.9	31.9
Source 1: NOAA
Source 2: National Weather Service

== Demographics ==
Historical population
Census	Pop.	Note	%±
1910	869		—
1920	1,962		125.8%
1930	1,996		1.7%
1940	2,234		11.9%
1950	2,220		−0.6%
1960	2,435		9.7%
1970	2,571		5.6%
1980	2,794		8.7%
1990	2,442		−12.6%
2000	2,652		8.6%
2010	2,402		−9.4%
2020	2,357		−1.9%
U.S. Decennial Census

=== 2020 census ===
As of the 2020 census, St. Maries had a population of 2,357. The median age was 40.5 years. 24.0% of residents were under the age of 18 and 22.2% of residents were 65 years of age or older. For every 100 females there were 97.1 males, and for every 100 females age 18 and over there were 92.6 males age 18 and over.

0.0% of residents lived in urban areas, while 100.0% lived in rural areas.

There were 992 households in St. Maries, of which 31.6% had children under the age of 18 living in them. Of all households, 45.6% were married-couple households, 19.1% were households with a male householder and no spouse or partner present, and 26.7% were households with a female householder and no spouse or partner present. About 29.0% of all households were made up of individuals and 14.7% had someone living alone who was 65 years of age or older.

There were 1,087 housing units, of which 8.7% were vacant. The homeowner vacancy rate was 1.6% and the rental vacancy rate was 9.3%.

Racial composition as of the 2020 census
Race	Number	Percent
White	2,183	92.6%
Black or African American	1	0.0%
American Indian and Alaska Native	40	1.7%
Asian	14	0.6%
Native Hawaiian and Other Pacific Islander	3	0.1%
Some other race	15	0.6%
Two or more races	101	4.3%
Hispanic or Latino (of any race)	54	2.3%

=== 2010 census ===
As of the census of 2010, there were 2,402 people, 999 households, and 641 families living in the city. The population density was 2,183.6 inhabitants per square mile (843.1/km^{2}). There were 1,092 housing units at an average density of 992.7 units per square mile (383.3 units/km^{2}). The racial makeup of the city was 96.0% White, 0.3% African American, 1.1% Native American, 0.6% Asian, 0.1% Pacific Islander, 0.2% from other races, and 1.8% from two or more races. Hispanic or Latino of any race were 1.6% of the population.

There were 999 households, of which 32.1% had children under the age of 18 living with them, 47.4% were married couples living together, 12.2% had a female householder with no husband present, 4.5% had a male householder with no wife present, and 35.8% were non-families. 31.0% of all households were made up of individuals, and 15.8% had someone living alone who was 65 years of age or older. The average household size was 2.34 and the average family size was 2.88.

The median age in the city was 40.9 years. 24.5% of residents were under the age of 18; 7.8% were between the ages of 18 and 24; 22.7% were from 25 to 44; 25.4% were from 45 to 64; and 19.6% were 65 years of age or older. The gender makeup of the city was 49.4% male and 50.6% female.

=== 2000 census ===
As of the census of 2000, there were 2,652 people, 1,061 households, and 675 families living in the city. The population density was 2,434.8 inhabitants per square mile (940.1/km^{2}). There were 1,132 housing units at an average density of 1,039.3 units per square mile (401.3 units/km^{2}). The racial makeup of the city was 95.93% White, 1.73% Native American, 0.11% Asian, 0.19% from other races, and 2.04% from two or more races. Hispanic or Latino of any race were 1.66% of the population.

There were 1,061 households, out of which 33.3% had children under the age of 18 living with them, 50.7% were married couples living together, 9.2% had a female householder with no husband present, and 36.3% were non-families. 29.9% of all households were made up of individuals, and 15.4% had someone living alone who was 65 years of age or older. The average household size was 2.38 and the average family size was 2.98.

In the city, the population was spread out, with 26.4% under the age of 18, 7.6% from 18 to 24, 25.7% from 25 to 44, 23.3% from 45 to 64, and 17.0% who were 65 years of age or older. The median age was 38 years. For every 100 females, there were 102.6 males. For every 100 females age 18 and over, there were 95.1 males.

The median income for a household in the city was $32,054, and the median income for a family was $37,474. Males had a median income of $35,625 versus $19,509 for females. The per capita income for the city was $16,745. About 10.7% of families and 12.8% of the population were below the poverty line, including 16.5% of those under age 18 and 14.9% of those age 65 or over.

== Government ==
The city council of St. Maries consists of six council members. There is also a planning & zoning commission that consists of four members and a chairman. As of January 2020, the mayor of St. Maries was Tom Carver.

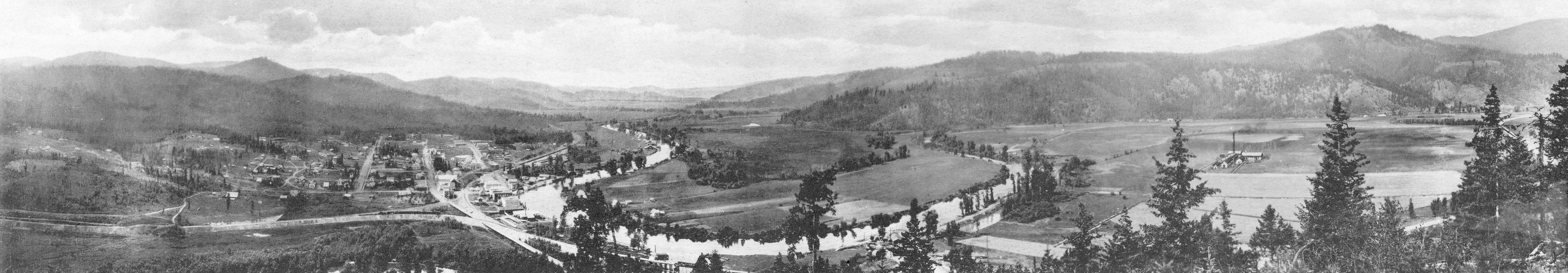
St. Maries, 1911

== Education ==
The public schools are operated by St. Maries Joint School District #41.

Name	Type	Grades
St. Maries High School	High	9–12
St. Maries Middle School	Middle	6–8
Heyburn Elementary	Elementary	K–5

The high school's mascot is a lumberjack and the school colors are forest green and old gold; the same are used for the middle and elementary school. The lumberjack statue at the elementary school on Main Street was originally a Texaco "Big Friend," a Muffler Man from the mid-1960s.

== Notable people ==
- Vernon Baker United States Army Medal of Honor recipient (1919–2010)
- Pappy Boyington, USMC, World War II fighter ace, Medal of Honor recipient
- Jeff Choate, college football coach at the University of Nevada, Reno
- Georgia Coleman, diver, won four medals at 1928 and 1932 Summer Olympics
- Tom Mueller, rocket engineer and founding employee of SpaceX
- C. A. Robins, physician and 22nd governor of Idaho (1947–1951)
