= Idaho State Highway 48 =

State highway in the U.S. State of Idaho

State Highway 48
- SH-48 highlighted in red

Route information
- Maintained by ITD
- Length: 24.409 mi (39.282 km)

Major junctions
- West end: I-15 near Roberts
- East end: US 26 Bus. in Ririe

Location
- Country: United States
- State: Idaho
- Counties: Jefferson, Bonneville

Highway system
- Idaho State Highway System; Interstate; US; State
← SH-47	→ SH-50

State Highway 48 (SH-48) is a 24.409-mile-long (39.282 km) state highway in the U.S. State of Idaho. SH-48 runs from Interstate 15 (I-15) near Roberts to U.S. Route 26 Business (US 26 Bus.) in Ririe.

== Route description ==
State Highway 48 starts at a diamond interchange with I-15 before heading due east on North Berrett Road through the town Roberts, where it becomes the road 627 North. SH-48 continues north on Old Highway 91 before turning east and leaving the city of Roberts as Roberts Highway (also known as 650 North), crossing Roberts Slough. Near the town of Lewisville, SH-48 turns south onto Saint Leon Road (alternatively known as North 3500 East), passing two schools as it enters the town of Lewisville. SH-48 continues due south out of the city limits before turning east onto Lewisville Highway (3500 East). The highway passes Philo T Farnsworth Elementary, Jefferson Elementary School, Rigby Middle School and Rigby Senior High School before entering the city of Rigby on West 1st South.

In the city, SH-48 intersects U.S. Route 20 Business, providing access to the US 20 freeway as SH-48 passes underneath the freeway with no direct access. SH-48 leaves the city as Ririe Highway before passing through more farmland, turning due south onto North 4500 East and then east again on East 150 North. The highway turns south again onto North 4600 East before making a final turn east on County Line Road, crossing into Bonneville County and ending at U.S. Route 26 Business in the town of Ririe.

== Major intersections ==
County	Location	mi	km	Destinations	Notes
Jefferson		0.000– 0.106	0.000– 0.171	I-15 – Idaho Falls, Butte	I-15 exit 135.
Jefferson	Rigby	14.812	23.838	US 20 Bus.	
Bonneville	Ririe	24.409	39.282	US 26 Bus.	
1.000 mi = 1.609 km; 1.000 km = 0.621 mi
