= Mud Lake (Idaho) =

There are several lakes named Mud Lake within the U.S. state of Idaho.

- Mud Lake, Bear Lake County, Idaho. 42°07′58″N 111°17′50″W
- Mud Lake, Blaine County, Idaho. 43°12′52″N 114°10′36″W
- Mud Lake, Boise County, Idaho. 44°08′27″N 116°08′31″W
- Mud Lake, Bonner County, Idaho. 48°11′35″N 116°23′59″W
- Mud Lake, Idaho County, Idaho. 45°56′07″N 114°59′12″W
- Mud Lake, Idaho County, Idaho. 46°15′37″N 115°14′10″W
- Mud Lake, Jefferson County, Idaho 43°52′51″N 112°23′53″W
- Mud Lake, Nez Perce County, Idaho. 46°13′03″N 116°50′46″W
- Mud Lake, Shoshone County, Idaho. 46°57′27″N 115°36′26″W
- Mud Lake, Valley County, Idaho. 44°39′07″N 115°29′50″W

== Other places ==
- Mud Lake, Idaho, a city in Jefferson County 43°50′27″N 112°28′55″W
- Mud Lake Wildlife Management Area, in Jefferson County and managed by the Idaho Department of Fish and Game 43°53′29″N 112°25′00″W
