= National Register of Historic Places listings in Jefferson County, Idaho =

Location of Jefferson County in Idaho

This is a list of the National Register of Historic Places listings in Jefferson County, Idaho.

This is intended to be a complete list of the properties on the National Register of Historic Places in Jefferson County, Idaho, United States. Latitude and longitude coordinates are provided for many National Register properties and districts; these locations may be seen together in a map.

There are 6 properties listed on the National Register in the county. More may be added; properties and districts nationwide are added to the Register weekly.

This National Park Service list is complete through NPS recent listings posted May 1, 2026.

== Current listings ==
	Name on the Register	Image	Date listed	Location	City or town	Description
1	Hotel Patrie	Hotel Patrie	November 7, 1978 (#78001068)	U.S. Route 91; 43°43′16″N 112°07′35″W	Roberts	
2	Jefferson County Courthouse	Jefferson County Courthouse	September 27, 1987 (#87001586)	134 N. Clark; 43°40′24″N 111°54′38″W	Rigby	One of three nearly identical county courthouses in Idaho designed by Sundberg & Sundberg for 1938 W.P.A. projects. Demolished in 2016.
3	Ririe A Pegram Truss Railroad Bridge	Ririe A Pegram Truss Railroad Bridge	July 25, 1997 (#97000759)	Over the Snake River, 1 mile north-northeast of the junction of Heise Rd. and East Belt Branch railroad tracks 43°39′59″N 111°44′16″W	Ririe vicinity	
4	Ririe B Pegram Truss Railroad Bridge		July 25, 1997 (#97000760)	Over the Snake River flood channel, 0.5 miles north-northeast of the junction of Heise Rd. and East Belt Branch railroad tracks 43°39′44″N 111°44′25″W	Ririe vicinity	
5	Ririe Community Hall	Ririe Community Hall	May 8, 2019 (#100003924)	455 Main St. 43°37′52″N 111°46′25″W	Ririe	
6	Josiah Scott House		November 8, 1982 (#82000387)	Southwest of Annis; 43°43′13″N 111°57′02″W	Annis vicinity	

== See also ==
- List of National Historic Landmarks in Idaho
- National Register of Historic Places listings in Idaho
