= Jerald Raymond =

American rancher and politician from Idaho

Member of the Idaho House of Representatives
- Incumbent
- Assumed office December 1, 2022
- Preceded by: David Cannon (redistricting)
- Constituency: 31st district Seat A
- In office December 1, 2018 – November 30, 2020
- Preceded by: Van Burtenshaw
- Succeeded by: Karey Hanks
- Constituency: 35th district Seat A

Personal details
- Born: Rigby, Idaho
- Party: Republican
- Spouse: Cheri Raymond
- Children: 6
- Occupation: Rancher, politician

Jerald Raymond is an American rancher and politician from Idaho. Raymond is a Republican member of Idaho House of Representatives for District 31, seat A.

== Early life ==
Raymond was born in Rigby, Idaho. Raymond graduated from Rigby High School.

== Education ==
Raymond attended Ricks College.

== Career ==
Raymond is a rancher and cattle breeder in Idaho.

Raymond is an U.S. Department of the Interior appointee to the BLM Resource Advisory Council.

Raymond is a former commissioner for Jefferson County, Idaho.

On November 6, 2018, Raymond won the election unopposed and became a Republican member of Idaho House of Representatives for District 35, seat A.

== Personal life ==
Raymond's wife is Cheri Raymond. They have six children. Raymond and his family live in Menan, Idaho.
