= Camas Creek (Clark and Jefferson counties, Idaho) =

Stream in the state of Idaho

- Location of the mouth of Camas Creek in Idaho Camas Creek (Clark and Jefferson counties, Idaho) (the United States)

Location
- Country: United States
- State: Idaho
- Counties: Clark County, Idaho, Jefferson County, Idaho

Physical characteristics
- Source
  - location: near Kilgore, Clark County, Idaho
  - coordinates: 44°21′52″N 111°53′36″W
  - elevation: 6,287 ft (1,916 m)
- Mouth: Mud Lake
  - location: northeast of Mud Lake, Jefferson County, Idaho
  - coordinates: 43°53′24″N 112°21′32″W
  - elevation: 4,783 ft (1,458 m)
- Length: 63 mi (101 km)
- Basin size: 1,011 sq mi (2,620 km^{2})

Camas Creek is a 63-mile (101 km) long stream in southeastern Idaho, United States, that is a tributary of Mud Lake.

== Description ==
Beginning at an elevation of 6,287 feet (1,916 m) near Kilgore in northeastern Clark County, it flows southwest into Jefferson County and receives its largest tributary, Beaver Creek. It then passes through the Camas National Wildlife Refuge, and reaches its mouth northeast of the town of Mud Lake, at an elevation of 4,783 feet (1,458 m). Camas Creek has a 1,011-square-mile (2,618 km^{2}) watershed.

== See also ==
- List of rivers of Idaho
