= Jeff Siddoway =

American politician from Idaho

Jeff C. Siddoway

Former member of the Idaho Senate from district 35
- In office December 1, 2006 – November 30, 2018
- Preceded by: Don Burtenshaw
- Succeeded by: Van Burtenshaw

Personal details
- Born: October 21, 1948 (age 77) Rexburg, Idaho
- Party: Republican
- Spouse: Cindy
- Children: 3
- Occupation: Farmer/owner, politician

Jeff C. Siddoway (born October 21, 1948) was a Republican member of the Idaho Senate, representing the 35th district from 2006 through 2018.

== Early life, education and career ==
Jeff Siddoway was born in Rexburg, Idaho, and attended South Fremont High School in St. Anthony and University of Idaho.

Siddoway is currently a farmer/owner of Juniper Mountain Ranch of sheep, elk, and bison.

He is married to Cindy Butts and is a father to three children: Billie Jean, Jodie, and J. C.

== Committees ==
2016

Local Government & Taxation – Chair

Resources & Environment

State Affairs

== Elections ==
District 35 Senate - Butte, Clark, Custer, Jefferson and Lemhi counties, and part of Fremont County
Year	Candidate	Votes	Pct	Candidate	Votes	Pct	Candidate	Votes	Pct
2006 primary	Jeff Siddoway	3,060	48.3%	Leon Clark	1,760	27.8%	George Ellsworth	1,510	23.9%
2006 general	Jeff Siddoway	9,818	69.4%	Luke Prange	4,327	30.6%			
2008 primary	Jeff Siddoway (incumbent)	4,868	100%						
2008 general	Jeff Siddoway (incumbent)	14,655	77.8%	Luke Prange	4,189	22.2%			
2010 primary	Jeff Siddoway (incumbent)	6,442	100%						
2010 general	Jeff Siddoway (incumbent)	12,571	100%						

District 35 Senate - Butte, Clark, Fremont and Jefferson counties
Year	Candidate	Votes	Pct	Candidate	Votes	Pct
2012 primary	Jeff Siddoway (incumbent)	7,323	100%			
2012 general	Jeff Siddoway (incumbent)	16,745	100%			
2014 primary	Jeff Siddoway (incumbent)	6,247	100%			
2014 general	Jeff Siddoway (incumbent)	16,665	100%			
2016 primary	Jeff Siddoway (incumbent)	2,461	100%			
2016 general	Jeff Siddoway (incumbent)	13,954	100%			

Siddoway supported Fmr. Governor Mitt Romney for 2012 Republican Party presidential primaries.

== Organizations ==
- President of Fremont Wool Growers Association
- Former President, Idaho Wool Growers Association
