= Eastern Idaho =

Region in Idaho, United States

Coordinates: 43°N 112°W

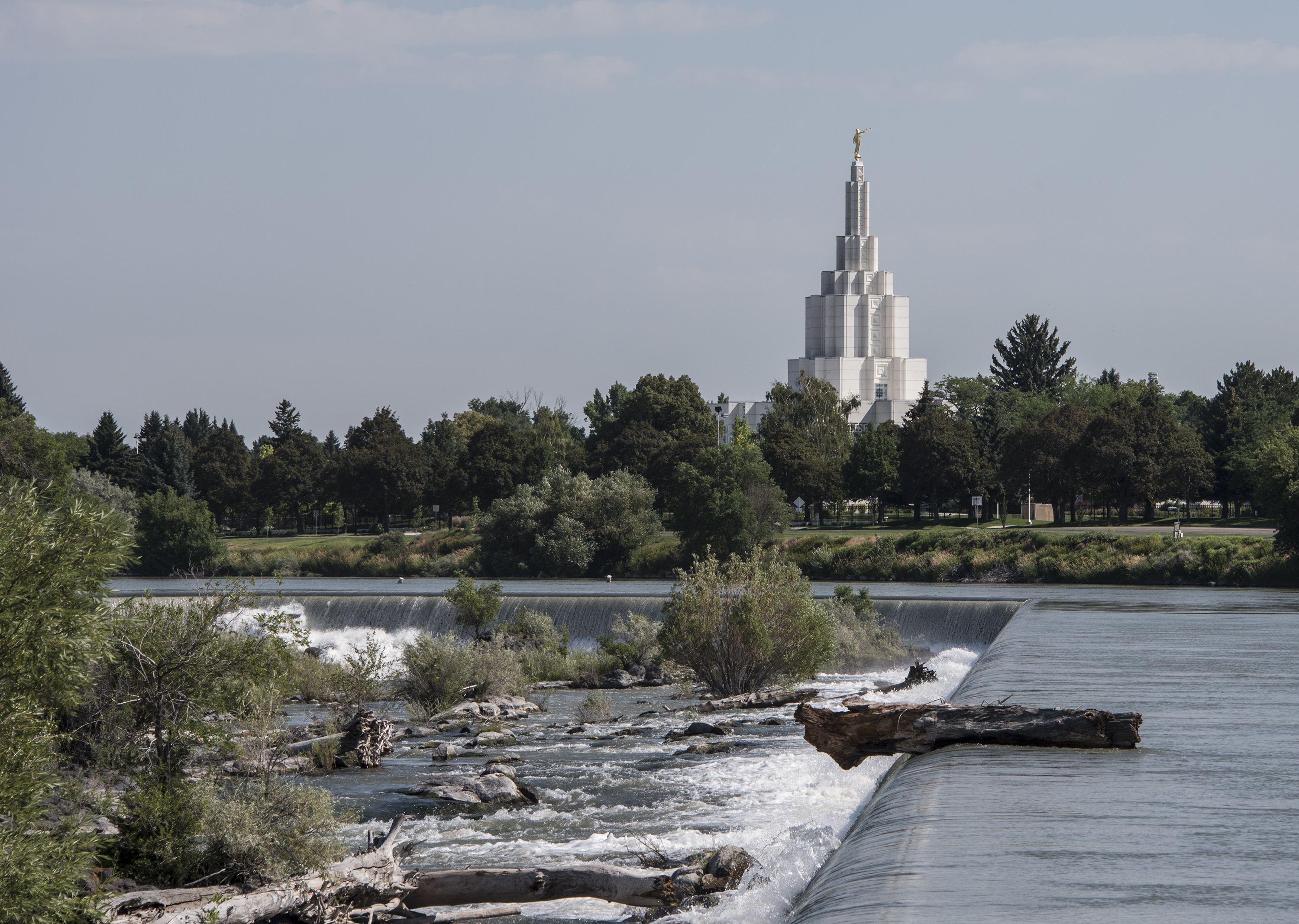
The Idaho Falls Temple, located in Idaho Falls, a city in Eastern Idaho.

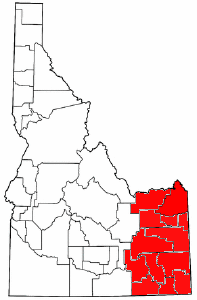
Map of Idaho highlighting Eastern Idaho in red

Eastern Idaho is the area of Idaho lying east of the Magic Valley region. Much of the region is in the Mormon Corridor, and the Church of Jesus Christ of Latter-day Saints plays a major role in the lives of the region's residents.

Eastern Idaho is generally understood to include Bannock, Bear Lake, Bingham, Bonneville, Caribou, Clark, Franklin, Fremont, Jefferson, Madison, Oneida, Power and Teton counties.

== Demographics ==
According to the 2010 census the counties of the Eastern Idaho region had a combined population of 365,847. Idaho Falls and Pocatello are the region's largest cities and only metropolitan areas, accounting for the majority of the region's population. Other important cities include Rexburg, Chubbuck and Blackfoot. Americans who are of English ancestry form a large plurality in every county in eastern Idaho.

== Politics ==
Eastern Idaho is a solidly Republican region, even more so than the rest of the state. No county in the region, except for one, has voted for a Democratic presidential nominee since the landslide election of 1964, which was also the last time the state of Idaho as a whole voted for the candidate of the Democratic Party. The sole exception is Teton County, which voted for Barack Obama in 2008, Joe Biden in 2020, and Kamala Harris in 2024.

The region has also shown a strong affinity for third-party candidates, such as for the candidacies of George Wallace in 1968, John G. Schmitz in 1972, Bo Gritz in 1992, and Evan McMullin in 2016; the latter three performed exceptionally well there proportionate to the share of the national vote. (Note: Although Wallace underperformed his national margins in the region, he received some of his best results outside of the South in eastern Idaho.)

== Education ==
Eastern Idaho is home to several of the state's colleges and universities, including Idaho State University in Pocatello, College of Eastern Idaho in Idaho Falls and Brigham Young University-Idaho in Rexburg. The Center for Higher Education provides outreach degree programs for Idaho State University and the University of Idaho at University Place in Idaho Falls. Most of the region's cities and towns support separate public school districts.

== Culture ==
Eastern Idaho is generally thought of as an all-season outdoor mecca above all else, with ski resorts Kelly Canyon and Pebble Creek, and extreme proximity to Yellowstone, the Tetons, Jackson, and Grand Targhee in Wyoming, each of which lie near the Idaho border. The area is also renowned in the fly fishing world as well, with travelers coming from afar to fish the Snake River and its branches and tributaries. Island Park, Bear Lake, Heise Hot Springs, and Lava Hot Springs are also regional tourist hotspots.

Cultural events are routinely held at Idaho State University and Brigham Young University-Idaho, and at various venues throughout downtown Idaho Falls. Idaho State University's 123,000-square-foot (11,400 m^{2}) L.E. and Thelma E Stephens Performing Arts Center contains state-of-the-art performance space. The facility's Jensen Grand Concert Hall contains more than 500 fiberglass-reinforced gypsum panels which allow the concert hall to be computer-tuned. Two ceiling canopies allow the acoustics of the hall to be computer-adjusted, making the center a hit with both performers and their audiences. Idaho Falls's Museum of Idaho brings in major national exhibitions each year, including Da Vinci inventions and the famous Bodies exhibit.

The Eastern Idaho State Fair is held every September in Blackfoot. The 2004 independent film Napoleon Dynamite was set in and filmed on location in Preston in Cache Valley.

Since the Church of Jesus Christ of Latter-day Saints is the largest religion in the region, Mormon culture dominates the region, though there are also many Methodists, Baptists, Episcopalians, Lutherans, Roman Catholics, Presbyterians, and Jehovah's Witnesses.

There are only two professional sports teams in the region. First is the Idaho Falls Chukars of Minor League Baseball. The organization, which has changed names and affiliations numerous times, has been around since 1940 and has played at Melaleuca Field since 2007. Second, the Idaho Falls Spud Kings, who play at the Mountain America Center in Idaho Falls. The team played their first game in the winter of 2022.

In the spring of 2018, Eastern Idaho gained a semi-professional soccer team Idaho Lobos FC based in Idaho Falls. The team competes in the Mountain Conference of the UPSL.

== Agriculture ==
The Eastern Idaho region grows most of Idaho's potato crop, making it one of the world's most productive potato-growing areas. Barley for beer production is also significant. Several major breweries, including Coors, Anheuser-Busch and Mexico's Grupo Modelo have barley producing operations in the area. Sugar beets, alfalfa and wheat are also major crops. There are also many cattle ranches for raising beef.

== Technology ==
Idaho National Laboratory between Idaho Falls and Arco in Butte County is one of the nation's top nuclear research facilities. Philo Farnsworth, inventor of the cathode-ray tube, and considered the primary inventor of television grew up in Rigby. ON Semiconductor (formerly AMIS) of Pocatello is a computer chip manufacturer. Idaho State University in Pocatello is home to the Idaho Accelerator Center. The center contains 10 operating accelerators used in research done through the university, national laboratories such as INL, and the private sector. Idaho State University operates the Center For Advanced Energy Studies at University Place in Idaho Falls. This public-private partnership researches solutions to America's continuing energy crisis.

== See also ==
- Idaho Falls metropolitan area
- Pocatello metropolitan area
- Rexburg micropolitan area
- The Church of Jesus Christ of Latter-day Saints in Idaho
- Mormon Corridor
