= Paul Romrell =

American politician from Idaho

Member of the Idaho House of Representatives from District 35 Seat B
- In office December 1, 2012 – November 30, 2016
- Preceded by: Lenore Barrett (redistricting)
- Succeeded by: Karey Hanks

Personal details
- Born: Fremont County, Idaho
- Party: Republican
- Education: Ricks College; Boise State University
- Profession: Health administration
- Website: paulromrell.com

Paul Romrell (born in Fremont County, Idaho) is a Republican Idaho State Representative since 2012 representing District 35 in the B seat.

== Education ==
Romrell graduated from South Fremont High School and Ricks College (now Brigham Young University–Idaho, and studied through Boise State University.

== Elections ==
District 35 House Seat B - Butte, Clark, Fremont, and Jefferson Counties
Year	Candidate	Votes	Pct	Candidate	Votes	Pct	Candidate	Votes	Pct	Candidate	Votes	Pct
2012 Primary	Paul Romrell	3,735	50.0%	Karey Hanks	1,756	23.5%	Jon Shelley	1,319	17.7%	Pat Ridley	662	8.9%
2012 General	Paul Romrell	13,994	77.3%	Cindy Shotswell	4,114	22.7%						
2014 Primary	Paul Romrell (inc.)	6,708	100%									
2014 General	Paul Romrell (inc.)	10,841	100%									
2016 Primary	Paul Romrell (inc.)	3,288	48.2%	Karey Hanks	3,535	51.8%						
