= Grant, Idaho =

Unincorporated community in the state of Idaho, United States

- Unincorporated community
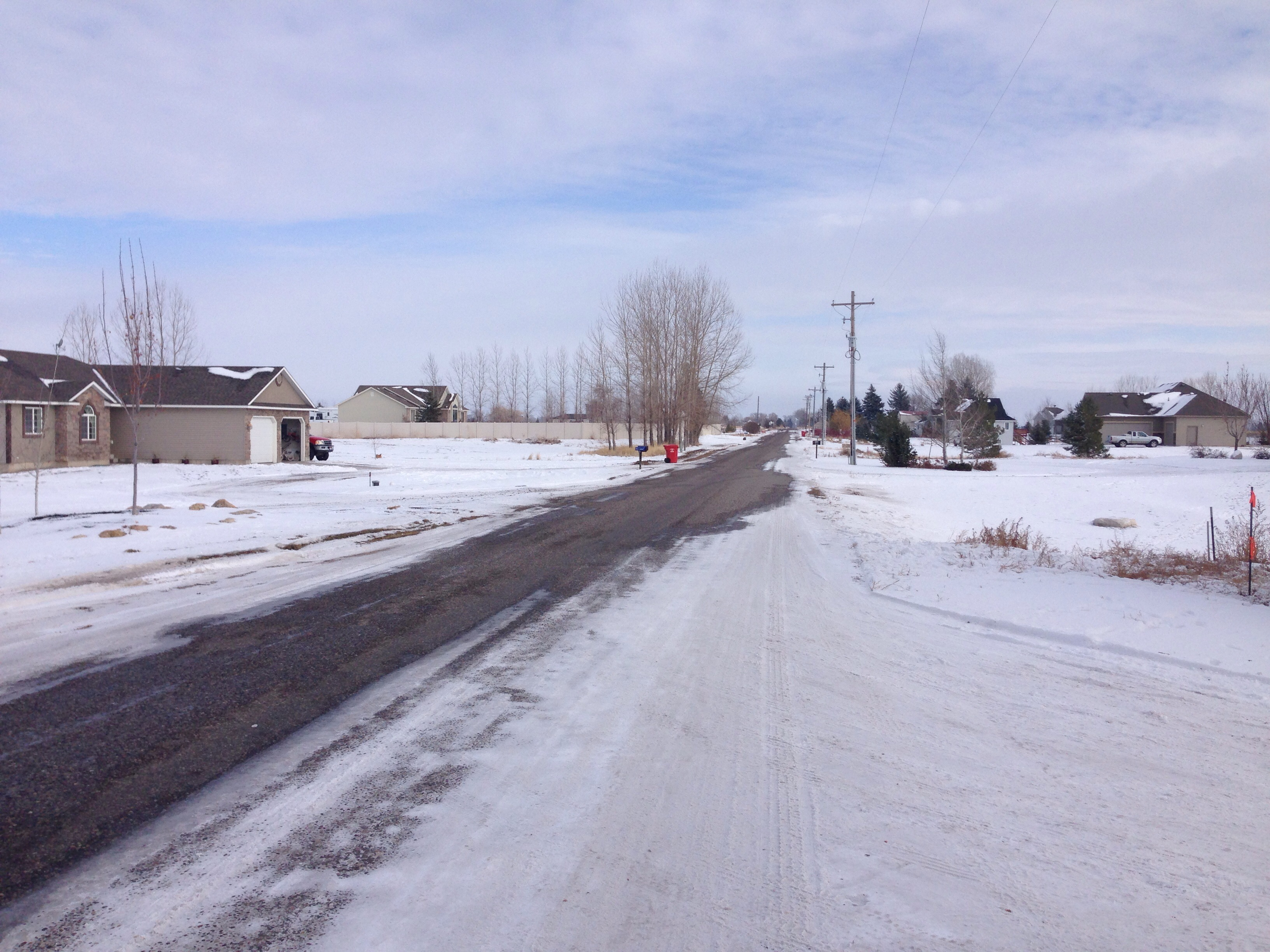
- E 100 N or "Farm to Market Road" in Grant, Idaho

- Location within Idaho Location within the United States
- Coordinates: 43°38′28″N 112°0′47″W
- Country: United States
- State: Idaho
- County: Jefferson
- Elevation: 4,790 ft (1,460 m)
- Time zone: UTC-7 (Mountain (MST))
  - Summer (DST): UTC-6 (MDT)
- ZIP code: 83442
- Area codes: 208, 986
- GNIS feature ID: 372901

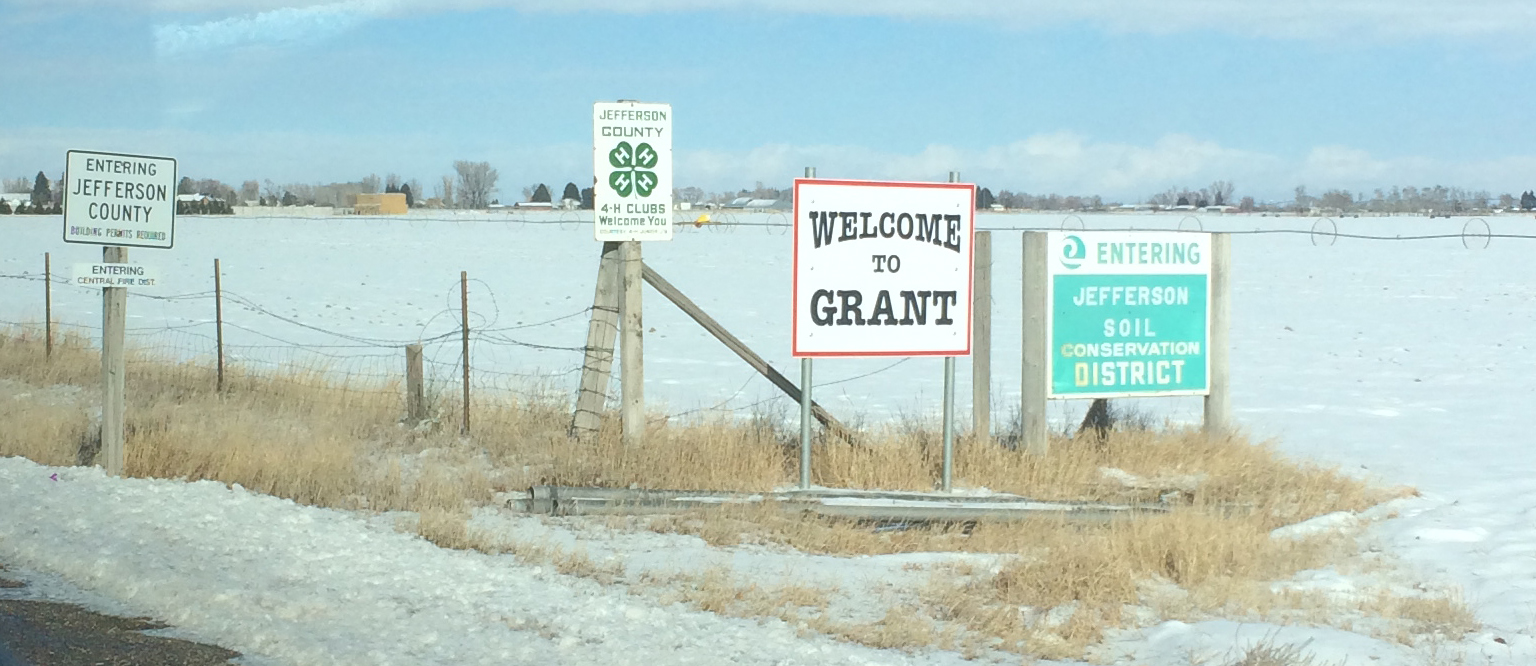
Entering Grant, Idaho on Lewisville Highway, northbound

Grant is an unincorporated community in Jefferson County, Idaho, United States.

== Location ==
Grant is a rural community close to the Snake River. It is 5.3 miles (8.5 km) west-southwest of Rigby. and 12.1 miles (19.5 km) north of Idaho Falls.

== History ==
Grant was known historically as Poverty Flat. The land was predominantly sagebrush, with wildlife trails bringing the first pioneers to the area in the late 1870s and early 1880s. The first settlers were members of the Church of Jesus Christ of Latter-day Saints (LDS Church), second generation to those who had arrived in the Salt Lake valley in the mid-1800s. Alfred Kossuth DaBell and James Ottowell Webster established the first homesteads in Poverty Flat in 1888. They spent that initial winter with family members in the nearby town of Lewisville, then began to build their farms in the spring of 1889. The first permanent settler in Poverty Flat was Jeppe Peter Hansen, originally from Denmark, who arrived just before the DaBells and the Websters returned from Lewisville.

Between 1891 and 1892, the community constructed a small building to be used as both church and school and the Grant School District was organized. The Grant Ward of the LDS Church was also established that year, named after Heber J. Grant, the 7th President of the LDS Church. The first postmaster, Frederick C. Hanson, was appointed on March 3, 1893. The post office was connected to the "Grant Store," which remained in continuous operation for over 100 years until the late 1990s. In 1900, the Grant Ward was composed of 77 families and 389 individuals.

Grant's population was estimated at 200 in 1909.

The community grew significantly through the early twentieth century, resulting in the construction of several new buildings and a baseball diamond. The "Grant Hall," built in 1900, became a social center for the area, with people coming from all over the Snake River valley to attend weekly dances. On July 4, 1920, a group of local cowboys and farmers held a rodeo on the baseball diamond. This became an annual event that eventually moved to Rigby, Idaho, where it is still held every year on Flag Day and is known as the Jefferson County Stampede.
