= Monteview, Idaho =

Unincorporated community in the state of Idaho, United States

- Unincorporated community
- Location within Idaho Location within the United States
- Coordinates: 43°58′19″N 112°32′11″W
- Country: United States
- State: Idaho
- County: Jefferson
- Elevation: 4,793 ft (1,461 m)
- Time zone: UTC-7 (Mountain (MST))
  - Summer (DST): UTC-6 (MDT)
- ZIP code: 83435
- Area codes: 208, 986
- GNIS feature ID: 376172

Monteview is an unincorporated community in Jefferson County, Idaho, United States. Monteview is 9.5 miles (15.3 km) north-northwest of Mud Lake, and has a post office with ZIP code 83435.

== History ==
The first wave of settlers in the community of Monteview arrived in the area in 1914. They came as dry farmers but after years of hauling drinking and household water were delighted to find sufficient water near the surface of the rich level soil for that purpose.

Martin Landgren arrived in 1915 and said that at the time the community had no school, post office, or roads. After setting up their own housing and doing the necessary farming, the settlers joined together to build a log structure which served as school and church as well as a community center.

A man named Younger built a small two-room house and applied for a post office in the community. The neighbors met to decide on a name and when they had settled on two names: Mountain View and Lincoln, they asked the school children to make the final decision. They chose Mountain View but when they got to the post office department, they learned there was already a Mountain View so they changed it to Monteview.

== Climate ==
Climate data for Monteview, Idaho, 1991–2020 normals: 4815ft (1468m)
| Month | Jan | Feb | Mar | Apr | May | Jun | Jul | Aug | Sep | Oct | Nov | Dec | Year |
|---|---|---|---|---|---|---|---|---|---|---|---|---|---|
| Record high °F (°C) | 53 (12) | 55 (13) | 70 (21) | 85 (29) | 84 (29) | 95 (35) | 94 (34) | 95 (35) | 90 (32) | 84 (29) | 66 (19) | 53 (12) | 95 (35) |
| Mean maximum °F (°C) | 39.9 (4.4) | 44.6 (7.0) | 60.0 (15.6) | 73.8 (23.2) | 80.1 (26.7) | 89.4 (31.9) | 92.4 (33.6) | 93.4 (34.1) | 84.0 (28.9) | 73.6 (23.1) | 58.1 (14.5) | 44.8 (7.1) | 85.8 (29.9) |
| Mean daily maximum °F (°C) | 27.1 (−2.7) | 32.2 (0.1) | 45.6 (7.6) | 57.8 (14.3) | 66.6 (19.2) | 74.9 (23.8) | 84.3 (29.1) | 84.5 (29.2) | 74.9 (23.8) | 58.2 (14.6) | 40.8 (4.9) | 28.1 (−2.2) | 56.3 (13.5) |
| Daily mean °F (°C) | 16.2 (−8.8) | 20.5 (−6.4) | 32.8 (0.4) | 42.9 (6.1) | 51.9 (11.1) | 58.7 (14.8) | 66.2 (19.0) | 65.4 (18.6) | 56.4 (13.6) | 42.7 (5.9) | 28.9 (−1.7) | 17.5 (−8.1) | 41.7 (5.4) |
| Mean daily minimum °F (°C) | 5.2 (−14.9) | 8.8 (−12.9) | 20.0 (−6.7) | 27.9 (−2.3) | 37.1 (2.8) | 42.4 (5.8) | 48.1 (8.9) | 46.2 (7.9) | 37.8 (3.2) | 27.2 (−2.7) | 16.9 (−8.4) | 6.9 (−13.9) | 27.0 (−2.8) |
| Mean minimum °F (°C) | −19.8 (−28.8) | −11.8 (−24.3) | 4.4 (−15.3) | 13.8 (−10.1) | 23.0 (−5.0) | 30.5 (−0.8) | 39.0 (3.9) | 38.4 (3.6) | 26.8 (−2.9) | 15.9 (−8.9) | 2.8 (−16.2) | −18.1 (−27.8) | −23.1 (−30.6) |
| Record low °F (°C) | −40 (−40) | −22 (−30) | −4 (−20) | 7 (−14) | 15 (−9) | 27 (−3) | 34 (1) | 36 (2) | 23 (−5) | 9 (−13) | −3 (−19) | −34 (−37) | −40 (−40) |
| Average precipitation inches (mm) | 0.92 (23) | 0.69 (18) | 0.73 (19) | 0.98 (25) | 1.20 (30) | 1.30 (33) | 0.60 (15) | 0.80 (20) | 0.62 (16) | 0.98 (25) | 0.57 (14) | 0.77 (20) | 10.16 (258) |
Source 1: NOAA
Source 2: XMACIS2 (records & monthly max/mins)
