= Tanoa =

Tanoa may refer to:

- Pelusios, a genus of African side-necked turtles
- Kava Bowl (tanoa), a Samoan ceremonial bowl

== Name ==
Given name

- Tanoa Togiai (born 2001), American football player
