= Kelly Canyon =

Alpine ski area in Idaho

- Location in Idaho Kelly Canyon (the United States)
- Location: Targhee National Forest; Jefferson County & Madison County, Idaho, United States
- Nearest city: Ririe; Idaho Falls
- Coordinates: 43°38′45″N 111°37′48″W
- Vertical: 1,000 feet (305 m)
- Top elevation: 6,600 feet (2,012 m)
- Base elevation: 5,600 feet (1,707 m)
- Skiable area: 640 acres (2.6 km^{2})
- Trails: 26: 35% easiest; 45% more difficult; 20% most difficult
- Longest run: 1.3 miles (2.1 km)
- Lift system: 1 triple, 3 double chairs 1 Sun Kid, conveyor belt
- Terrain parks: 1
- Snowfall: 200 inches (510 cm)
- Snowmaking: yes
- Night skiing: Mon-Sat, Day skiing on Sundays
- Website: kellycanyonresort.com

Kelly Canyon is an alpine ski area in eastern Idaho, in the Targhee National Forest. Northeast of Idaho Falls, it straddles the county line in the southeastern corner of Jefferson County and also in southern Madison County. The ski area opened in 1957, founded by E. Bud Johnson.

The summit is at an elevation of 6,600 feet (2,012 m) above sea level with a vertical drop of 1,000 feet (305 m), on 640 acres (2.6 km^{2}) of slopes. Lift service includes four double chairlifts and a rope tow on the north-facing slopes. The terrain is rated at 35% easiest, 45% more difficult, and 20% most difficult.

The annual snowfall is 200 inches (510 cm), supplemented with snowmaking. The ski area is open seven days a week.

Kelly Canyon also has Nordic skiing and snowshoeing trails, just beyond the alpine lifts. The snowshoe trails are designated with Atlas Snowshoe markers for easy navigation.
