= Idaho's 35th legislative district =

American legislative district

Idaho's 35th legislative district is one of 35 districts of the Idaho Legislature. It is currently represented by Senator Jeff Siddoway, Republican of Terreton, Representative Van Burtenshaw, Republican of Terreton, and Rod Furniss, Republican of St. Anthony.

== District profile ==
=== 1980–1982 ===
In 1980 District 35 consisted of all of Power County and a portion of Bannock and Bingham counties.

| Legislature | Session | Senate | House Seat A | House Seat B |
| 45th (1980 - 1982) | 1st | Chick Bilyeu (D) | Al Johnson (R) | Dwight Horsch (D) |

=== 1984–1992 ===
From 1984 to 1992, District 35 did not exist.

=== 1992–2002 ===
From 1992 to 2002, District 35 consisted of all of Power County and a portion of Bannock and Bingham counties.

| Legislature | Session | Senate | House Seat A | House Seat B |
| 51st (1992 - 1994) | 1st | Chick Bilyeu (D) | Al Johnson (D) | Jim Christiansen (D) |
| 51st (1992 - 1994) | 2nd | Chick Bilyeu (D) | Al Johnson (D) | Jim Christiansen (D) |
| 52nd (1994 - 1996) | 1st | Moon Wheeler (R) | Al Johnson (D) | Jim Christiansen (D) |
| 52nd (1994 - 1996) | 2nd | Moon Wheeler (R) | Al Johnson (D) | Jim Christiansen (D) |
| 53rd (1996 - 1998) | 1st | Moon Wheeler (R) | Steven Hadley (R) | Wayne Kendell (R) |
| 53rd (1996 - 1998) | 2nd | Moon Wheeler (R) | Steven Hadley (R) | Wayne Kendell (R) |
| 54th (1998 - 2000) | 1st | Moon Wheeler (R) | Steven Hadley (R) | Wayne Kendell (R) |
| 54th (1998 - 2000) | 2nd | Moon Wheeler (R) | Steven Hadley (R) | Wayne Kendell (R) |
| 55th (2000 - 2002) | 1st | Moon Wheeler (R) | Steven Hadley (R) | Wayne Kendell (R) |
| 55th (2000 - 2002) | 2nd | Moon Wheeler (R) | Steven Hadley (R) | Wayne Kendell (R) |

=== 2002–2012 ===
From 2002 to 2012, District 35 consisted of all of Butte, Clark, Custer, Jefferson, and Lemhi and a portion of Fremont County.

| Legislature | Session | Senate | House Seat A | House Seat B |
| 57th (2002 - 2004) | 1st | Don Burtenshaw (R) | JoAn Wood (R) | Lenore Hardy Barrett (R) |
| 57th (2002 - 2004) | 2nd | Don Burtenshaw (R) | JoAn Wood (R) | Lenore Hardy Barrett (R) |
| 58th (2004 - 2006) | 1st | Don Burtenshaw (R) | JoAn Wood (R) | Lenore Hardy Barrett (R) |
| 58th (2004 - 2006) | 2nd | Don Burtenshaw (R) | JoAn Wood (R) | Lenore Hardy Barrett (R) |
| 59th (2006 - 2008) | 1st | Jeff Siddoway (R) | JoAn Wood (R) | Lenore Hardy Barrett (R) |
| 59th (2006 - 2008) | 2nd | Jeff Siddoway (R) | JoAn Wood (R) | Lenore Hardy Barrett (R) |
| 60th (2008 - 2010) | 1st | Jeff Siddoway (R) | JoAn Wood (R) | Lenore Hardy Barrett (R) |
| 60th (2008 - 2010) | 2nd | Jeff Siddoway (R) | JoAn Wood (R) | Lenore Hardy Barrett (R) |
| 61st (2010 - 2012) | 1st | Jeff Siddoway (R) | JoAn Wood (R) | Lenore Hardy Barrett (R) |
| 61st (2010 - 2012) | 2nd | Jeff Siddoway (R) | JoAn Wood (R) | Lenore Hardy Barrett (R) |

=== 2012–present ===
District 35 currently consists of all of Butte, Clark, Fremont, and Jefferson counties.

| Legislature | Session | Senate | House Seat A | House Seat B |
| 62nd (2012 - 2014) | 1st | Jeff Siddoway (R) | JoAn Wood (R) | Paul Romrell (R) |
| 62nd (2012 - 2014) | 2nd | Jeff Siddoway (R) | JoAn Wood (R) | Paul Romrell (R) |
| 63rd (2014 - 2016) | 1st | Jeff Siddoway (R) | Van Burtenshaw (R) | Paul Romrell (R) |
| 63rd (2014 - 2016) | 2nd | Jeff Siddoway (R) | Van Burtenshaw (R) | Paul Romrell (R) |
| 64th (2016 - 2018) | 1st | Jeff Siddoway (R) | Van Burtenshaw (R) | Karey Hanks (R) |
| 64th (2016 - 2018) | 2nd | Jeff Siddoway (R) | Van Burtenshaw (R) | Karey Hanks (R) |
| 65th (2018 - 2020) | 1st | Van Burtenshaw (R) | Jerald Raymond (R) | Rod Furniss (R) |
| 65th (2018 - 2020) | 2nd | Van Burtenshaw (R) | Jerald Raymond (R) | Rod Furniss (R) |
| 65th (2018 - 2020) | 1st | Van Burtenshaw (R) | Karey Hanks (R) | Rod Furniss (R) |
| 65th (2018 - 2020) | 2nd | Van Burtenshaw (R) | Karey Hanks (R) | Rod Furniss (R) |

== See also ==
- List of Idaho senators
- List of Idaho representatives
