= Hotel Patrie =

- U.S. National Register of Historic Places
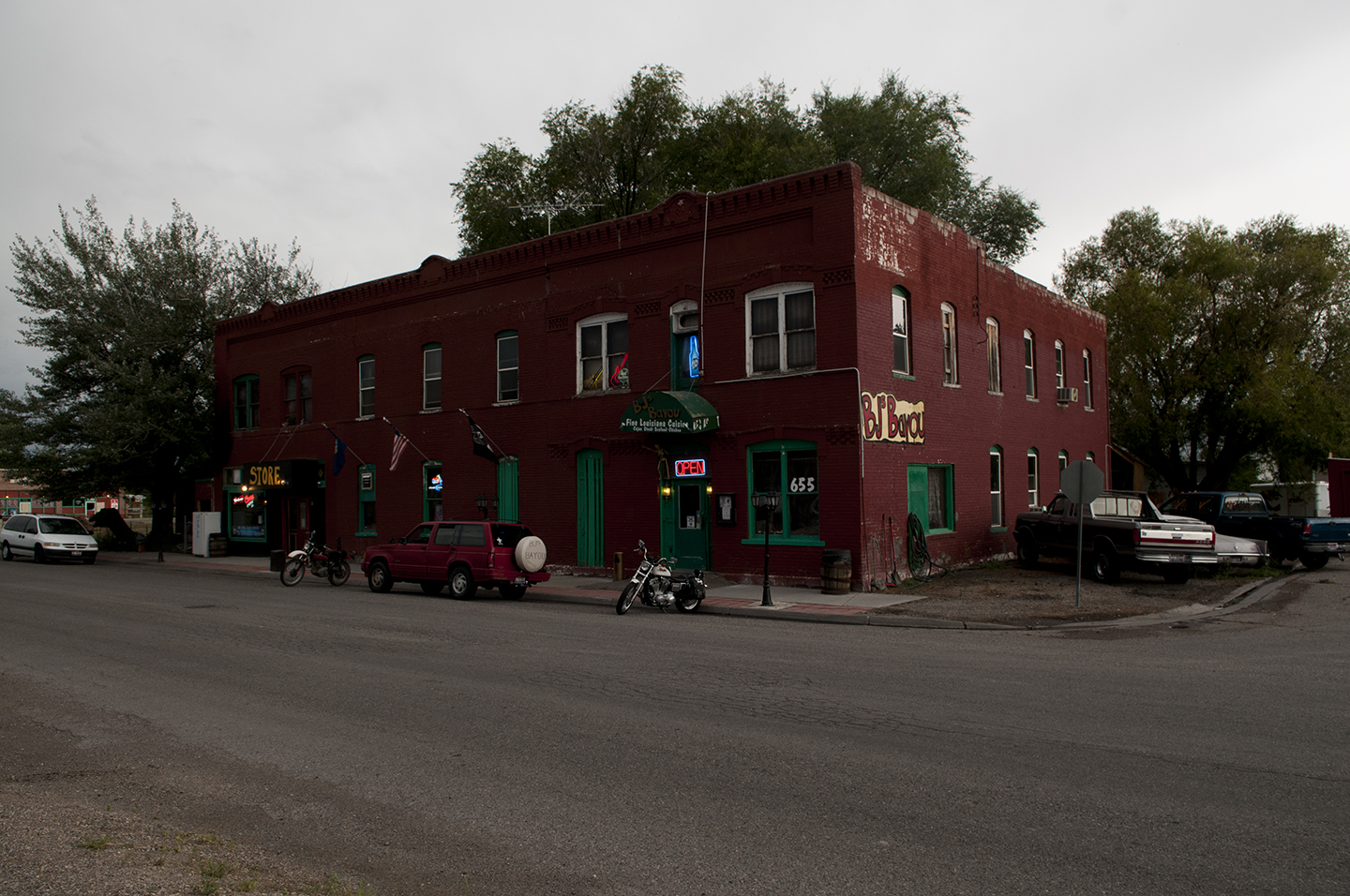
- The building's exterior in 2012

- Location within Idaho Location within the United States
- Location: U.S. 91, Roberts, Idaho
- Coordinates: 43°43′16″N 112°7′35″W
- Area: less than one acre
- Built: 1892, 1915, 1920s
- NRHP reference No.: 78001068
- Added to NRHP: November 7, 1978

The Hotel Patrie in Roberts, Idaho was built in 1892 and expanded in 1915 and in the 1920s. It has also been known as the Adams Hotel, as the Roberts Hotel, and as the American Hotel. It was listed on the National Register of Historic Places in 1978.

It is a two-story U-shaped brick building that, after expansions, is eight bays wide.

It was deemed significant as one of the oldest and largest buildings surviving in Roberts after the 1976 Teton dam flood.

== See also ==
- List of National Historic Landmarks in Idaho
- National Register of Historic Places listings in Jefferson County, Idaho
