= Mud Lake (Jefferson County, Idaho) =

- Location within Idaho Location within the United States
- Location: Jefferson County, Idaho; United States
- Coordinates: 43°52′24″N 112°24′27″W
- Type: Reservoir
- Primary inflows: Camas Creek
- Primary outflows: Evaporation, seepage, and irrigation
- Surface area: >3,000 acres (1,200 ha)
- Average depth: 5 feet (1.5 m)
- Surface elevation: 4,783 feet (1,458 m)

Mud Lake is a reservoir within the Mud Lake Wildlife Management Area on the Snake River Plain in north-central Jefferson County, Idaho, United States. It has an 4,783 feet (1,458 m) above sea level and is located northeast of the city of the same name. Its primary inflow is Camas Creek (including the creek's primary tributary, Beaver Creek). It has no outflow other than evaporation, seepage, and irrigation canals. Originally a sump, the lake gradually got smaller and deeper as dikes were built around it. Mud Lake covers an area of over 3,000 acres (1,200 ha) and has an average depth of about 5 feet (1.5 m).

== See also ==
- List of dams and reservoirs in Idaho
