= Ririe Community Hall =

- U.S. National Register of Historic Places
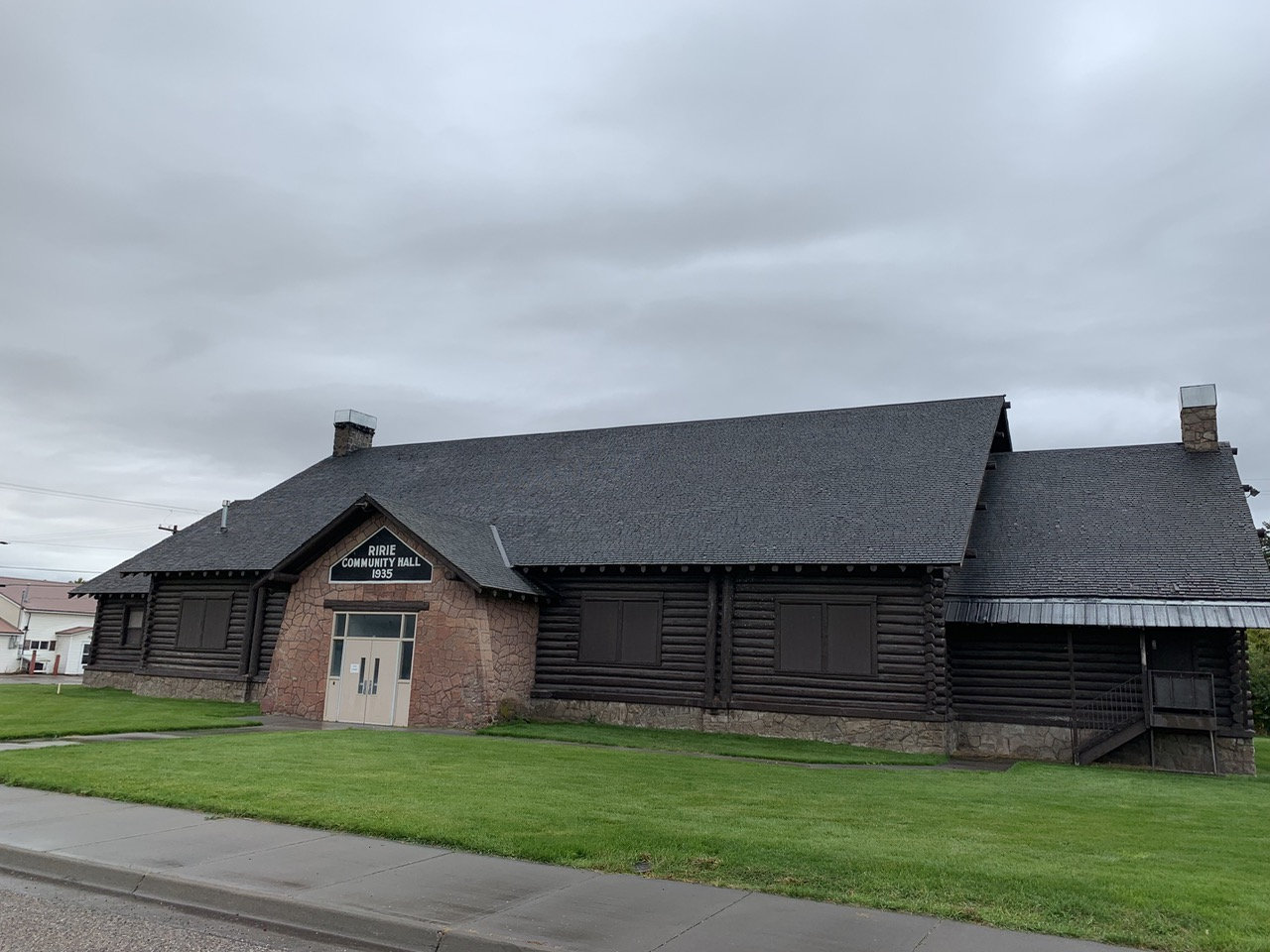

- Location within Idaho Location within the United States
- Location: Ririe, Idaho
- Coordinates: 43°37′52″N 111°46′25″W
- Area: 1.15 acres (0.47 ha)
- Built: 1933-35
- NRHP reference No.: 100003924
- Added to NRHP: May 8, 2019

The Ririe Community Hall, at 455 Main St. in Ririe, Idaho, was listed on the National Register of Historic Places in 2019.

It is a one-story log building built in 1933–35, funded by the Federal Emergency Relief Administration.

It was the only recreational facility in Ririe until 1967. It was used by physical education classes, by bands and choirs, and by dance classes of the high school and elementary school, and it was used for community events as well.

== See also ==
- List of National Historic Landmarks in Idaho
- National Register of Historic Places listings in Jefferson County, Idaho
