= Mud Lake Wildlife Management Area =

Protected area in Idaho, United States

- IUCN category IV (habitat/species management area)
- Location within Idaho
- Location: Jefferson County, Idaho, United States
- Nearest city: Mud Lake, ID
- Coordinates: 43°53′29″N 112°25′00″W
- Area: 8,853 acres (35.8 km^{2})
- Established: 1940
- Governing body: Idaho Department of Fish and Game
- Website: fishandgame.idaho.gov/ifwis/ibt/site.aspx?id=SE40

Mud Lake Wildlife Management Area at 8,853 acres (35.83 km^{2}) is an Idaho wildlife management area in Jefferson County north of the town of Mud Lake. Land acquisition for the WMA began in 1940, and the most recent acquisition was in 1969.

The WMA surrounds Mud Lake, which is only about 5 feet (1.5 m) deep. In March and early April up to 50,000 snow geese settle on the lake, along with other waterfowl, including trumpeter swans.
