= Annis, Idaho =

Unincorporated community in the state of Idaho, United States

- Unincorporated community
- Location within Idaho Location within the United States
- Coordinates: 43°43′42″N 111°56′10″W
- Country: United States
- State: Idaho
- County: Jefferson
- Elevation: 4,829 ft (1,472 m)
- Time zone: UTC-7 (Mountain (MST))
  - Summer (DST): UTC-6 (MDT)
- Area codes: 208, 986
- GNIS feature ID: 397382

Annis is an unincorporated community in Jefferson County, Idaho, United States. Annis is 4 miles (6.4 km) north-northeast of Rigby.

The first settlement at Annis was made in 1879. The community is named for Ann Kearney, first post mistress, plus the first letters of the word "island".

The name history of Ann Island becoming Annis is disputed. A plaque located at the old "Annis Little Butte Cemetery," currently known as "Little Butte Cemetery," reads in part:

"Annie's Place" Annis
March 1879, the first of many hardy, courageous pioneers" ... "First public building was a combined log post office and home of James and Anna Kearney. They forded "Dry Bed Channel" of Snake River to bring mail to their central place which became known as "Annie's Place." Kearneys applied for postal service in 1886 which was granted in 1896 but with the name of Annis."
Plaque No. 419 erected by the Daughters of the Utah Pioneers in 1982.

The Josiah Scott House, which is listed on the National Register of Historic Places, is located near Annis.

== Notable person from Annis ==
- Vardis Fisher
