= Ririe Days =

Annual celebration in Ririe, Ohio, United States

Ririe Days is an annual celebration of the people, customs and culture of Ririe, Idaho. It is held in downtown Ririe on the third weekend of July, with its first year being on July 16, 2009. Events take place all day including a golf scramble, craft fair, archery shoot, community breakfast, half marathon, 10k and 5k runs, car show, food vendors and carnival games.

Ririe Days is organized by volunteers through the Ririe Coalition for Community Development (RCCD) committee and most of the prizes are donated by local businesses who have agreed to be sponsors.

Main Street is closed off during the Ririe Days celebration and a large American flag is raised during the opening ceremonies, while the Idaho Falls Pipes and Drums performs the National Anthem.
