= Madison High School (Idaho) =

Coordinates: 43.829°N 111.770°W

- 2300 University Boulevard; Rexburg, Idaho 83440; United States

Information
- Type: Public
- School district: Madison School District (#321)
- Principal: Bradee R. Klassen
- Faculty: 70.75 (FTE)
- Grades: 10–12
- Enrollment: 1,320 (2023-2024)
- Student to teacher ratio: 18.66
- Colors: Red, white, & gray
- Athletics: IHSAA Class 5A
- Athletics conference: High Country
- Team name: Bobcats
- Rival: Rigby
- Website: www.msd321.com/o/mhs/

Madison High School is a three-year public secondary school in Rexburg, Idaho, the county seat of Madison County. It is the only traditional high school in the Madison School District #321, which includes Rexburg and the majority of the county. The school colors are red, white, and gray, and the mascot is a bobcat.

== Athletics ==
Madison competes in athletics in IHSAA Class 6A with the largest schools in the state. It is a member of the High Country Conference (6A) with Rigby, Thunder Ridge, and Highland of Pocatello and Canyon ridge.

With one of the smaller enrollments in 6A, Madison has moved up or down in classification several times over the decades. The Bobcats have won a number of state championships in both boys and girls sports.

The 2012 football team went undefeated (12–0) to win its seventh state football title, its first in Class 5A, defeating Coeur d'Alene High School 37–30 at Holt Arena in Pocatello, Idaho.

=== Rivals ===
Madison's traditional rival is Rigby, although Rigby has spent many years in a different conference than Madison. However, in 2016 Rigby joined Madison in the 5A conference. Another rival is the Highland Rams from Pocatello, Idaho.

=== State championships ===
- Debate (2): 2014, 2015
- Speech (2): 1990, 2018
- INL Scholastic Team (Science Bowl) (1): 2011

==== Boys ====
- Football (7): 1980, 1982, 1983, 1984, 1994, 1995, 2012
- Cross Country (1): 1983
- Basketball (8): 1930, 1954, 1981, 1997, 2001, 2002, 2007, 2011
- Track (1): 2004
- Golf (3): 1982, 1983, 2006
- Baseball (1): 1981

==== Girls ====
- Cross Country (1): 1990
- Volleyball (3): 1988, 1989, 1992, 2018, 2022, 2023, 2024
- Basketball (6): 1980, 1984, 1985, 1988, 1989, 1990
- Softball (1): 2004

== Notable alumni ==
- Matt Lindstrom, professional baseball player in Major League Baseball
- Clayton Mortensen, professional baseball player in Major League Baseball
- James Clarke, businessman and philanthropist
- Chari Hawkins, American heptathlete
