= Rigby High School =

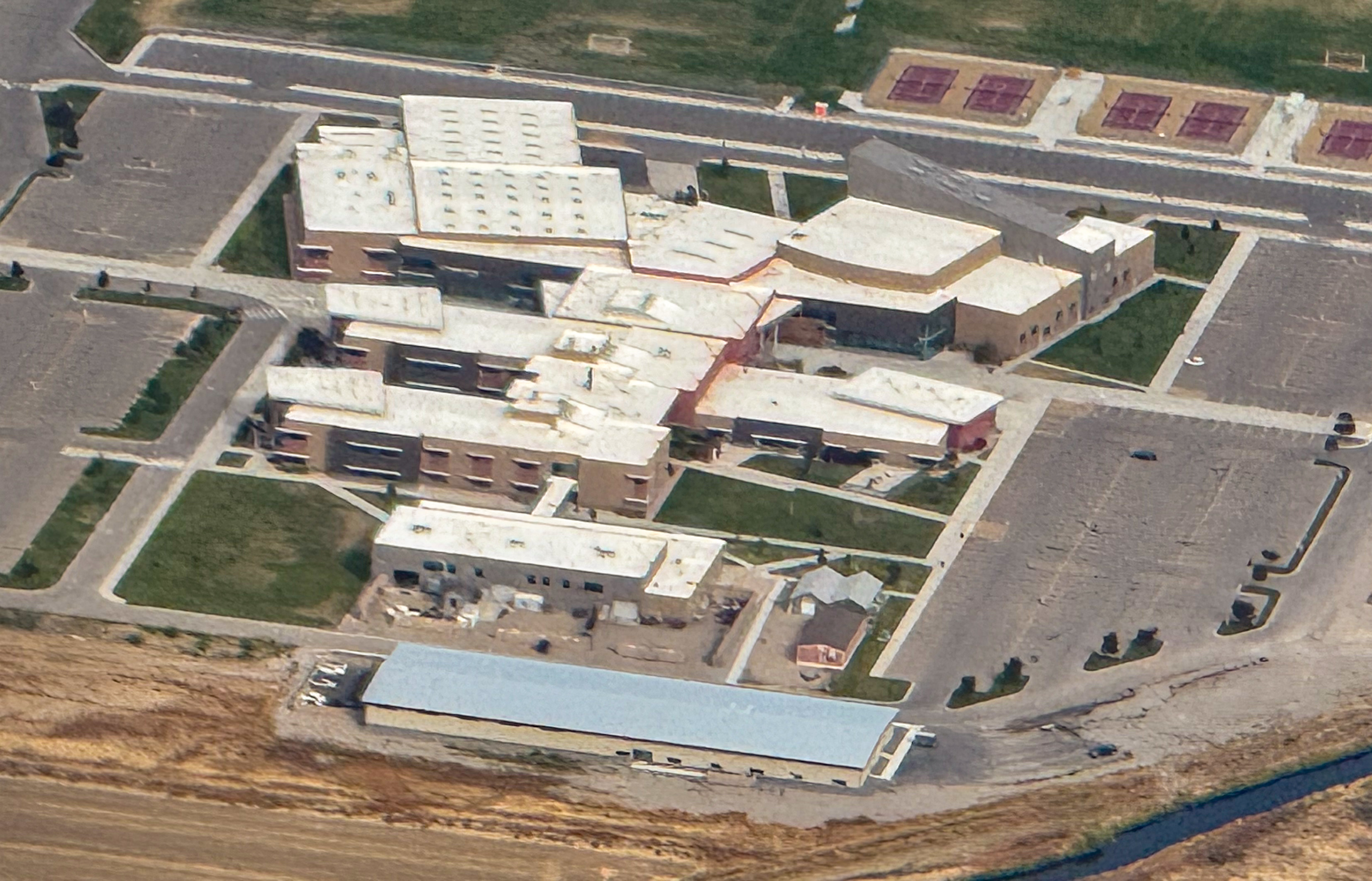
- Aerial view of high school

Location
- 3833 East Rigby High Lane; Rigby, Idaho; United States; 43.667°N 111.937°W

Information
- Type: Public
- Established: 1912, 114 years ago
- School district: Jefferson County; J.S.D. #251
- Principal: Bryan Lords
- Faculty: 88.93 (on FTE basis)
- Grades: 9–12
- Enrollment: 2,088 (2023-2024)
- Student to teacher ratio: 23.48
- Colors: Maroon & White
- Athletics: IHSAA Class 6A
- Athletics conference: High Country
- Team name: Trojan
- Rival: Madison Bobcats
- Yearbook: Iliad
- Feeder schools: Rigby Middle School, Farnsworth Middle School
- Elevation: 4,830 ft (1,470 m) AMSL
- Website: rigbytrojans.org

Location in the United States
Location in Idaho

Rigby High School is a four-year public high school in the western United States, located in Rigby, Idaho. Part of the Jefferson County School District 251, the approximate enrollment is 2,000 students in grades 9 to 12, from Rigby and surrounding communities. The school colors of RHS are maroon and gold, and the mascot is a Trojan. During state playoffs, the football team will wear a “Red Devils” pitchfork on their helmets - a throwback to the early mascot some decades ago.

== History ==
Rigby High School was established 114 years ago in 1912, with the first graduation in 1916. The school was originally located near Rigby City Park. The mascot was originally a Red Devil, and the school colors were maroon and gold. It wasn't until the early 1950s, when a high school located in the smaller, neighboring town of Menan burnt down and its students came to Rigby, that the school was given the mascot of the Trojans.

In the sixties and seventies the high school was replaced with a new building located west of down town Rigby, which became Rigby Junior High, but is now an empty lot. Also in the 1960s, Rigby High School gained more students from the smaller high school of Roberts. Since 1988, Rigby High resided just west of the city limits, but now has a new high school which was finished in 2013. The new building now houses grades 9 through 12 is located immediately to the east of the old high school building, which is now the Middle School and houses grades 6 through 8. As of 2016, the school principal is Bryan Lords.

== Athletics ==
Rigby competes in athletics in Idaho High School Activities Association (IHSAA) Class 6A, the highest classification in the state. It is a member of the High Country Conference. It also has an extended history of successful basketball teams. Rigby started in the second highest classification before moving to the highest classification between the 1987 and the early 2000’s. Rigby returned to Class 5A in 2016 before the classification was re-designated as 6A in a state-wide reclassification in 2024.

=== State titles ===
==== Boys ====
- Basketball (9): (A-2, now 4A) 1977, 1978, 1982, 1983, 1984, 1986; (A-1, now 6A) 1987; (4A) 2012, 2013, 2015
- High School Football (4) ((5A, now 6A) 2019, 2021, 2022, (6A) 2024
- Track (4): (A-1, now 6A) 1999; (4A, now 5A) 2010, 2011, 2012

==== Girls ====
- Track (3): (4A) 2007, 2008, 2009

== Notable alumni ==
- Philo Farnsworth, inventor and television pioneer
- Vardis Fisher, author
- Rod Furniss, businessman and politician
- Jessika Jenson, snowboarder
- Tanoa Togiai, NFL guard for the Washington Commanders
- Larry Wilson, NFL player
