= Karey Hanks =

American politician from Idaho

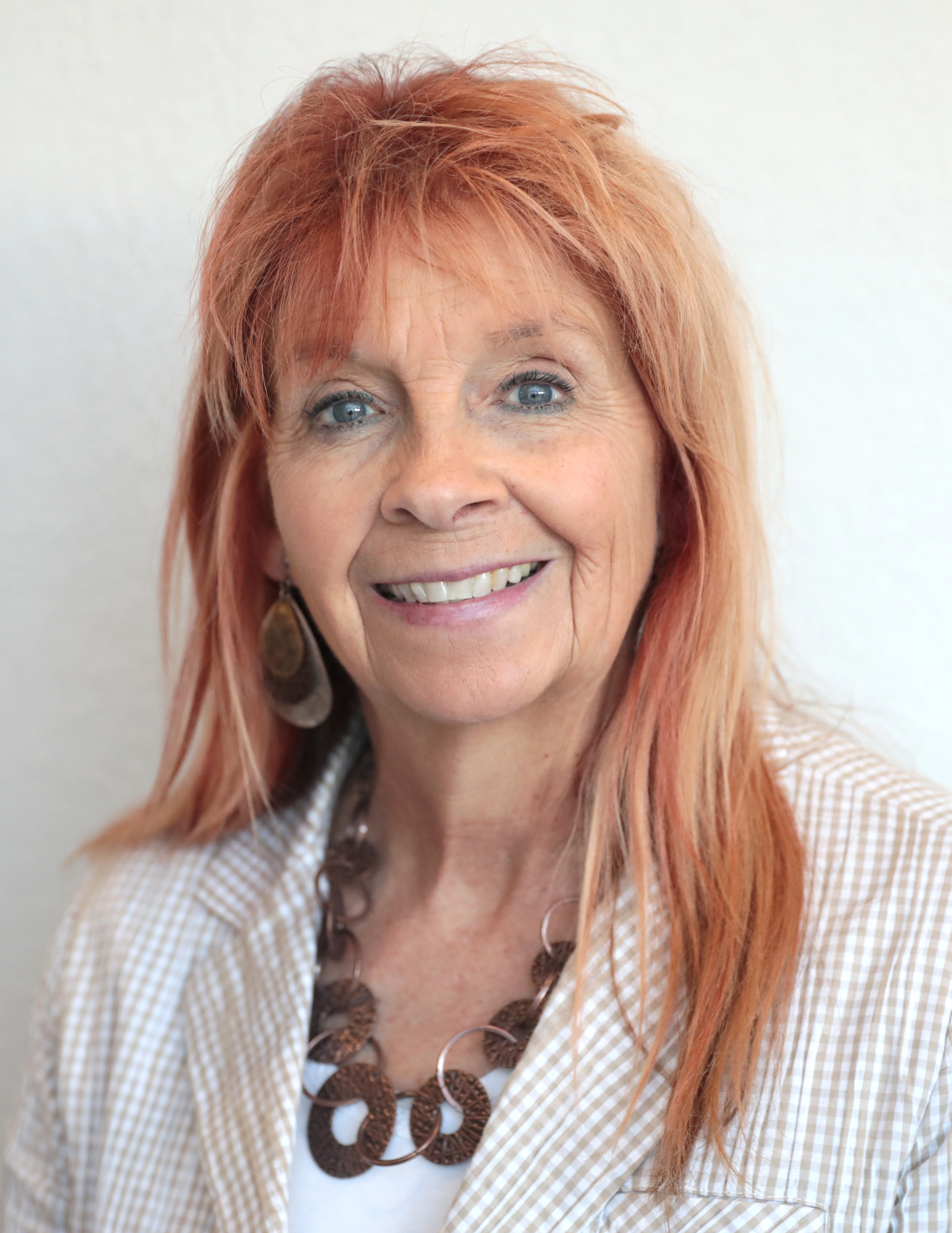
- Hanks at the 2022 Hazlitt Summit hosted by Young Americans for Liberty Foundation

Member of the Idaho House of Representatives
- In office December 1, 2020 – November 30, 2022
- Preceded by: Jerald Raymond
- Succeeded by: Kevin Andrus (redistricting)
- Constituency: 35th district Seat A
- In office December 1, 2016 – November 30, 2018
- Preceded by: Paul Romrell
- Succeeded by: Rod Furniss
- Constituency: 35th district Seat B

Personal details
- Born: Idaho Falls, Idaho, U.S.
- Political party: Republican
- Spouse: Burke
- Children: 7
- Education: Brigham Young University–Idaho (BA)
- Occupation: Politician

Karey Hanks is an American politician from Idaho. Hanks was a Republican member of Idaho House of Representatives for District 35, seat B.

== Early life and education ==
Hanks was born in Idaho Falls, Idaho and graduated from Idaho Falls High School. In 2011, Hanks earned a degree in psychology from Brigham Young University–Idaho.

== Career ==
Hanks was a bus driver for the Fremont County School District. On November 8, 2016, Hanks won the election unopposed and became a Republican member of Idaho House of Representatives for District 35, seat B.

Hanks the Republican nominee for her old seat in the Idaho House of Representatives in the 2020 election. Hanks is running unopposed in the November general election.

In October 2020, Hanks appeared in a video produced by the Idaho Freedom Foundation. Alongside Lieutenant Governor Janice McGeachin and other state legislators, Hanks criticized Governor Brad Little and stated, "The fact that a pandemic may or may not be occurring changes nothing about the meaning or intent of the state constitution and the preservation of our inalienable rights."

== Personal life ==
Hanks' husband is Burke. They have seven children. Hanks and her family lives in St. Anthony, Idaho.
