= Josiah Scott House =

Historic house in Idaho, United States

- U.S. National Register of Historic Places
- Location within Idaho Location within the United States
- Nearest city: Annis, Idaho
- Coordinates: 43°43′13″N 111°57′2″W
- Area: less than one acre
- Built: 1908-1910
- Built by: Alexander Whitehead
- Architectural style: Colonial Revival
- NRHP reference No.: 82000387
- Added to NRHP: November 8, 1982

The Josiah Scott House in Annis, Idaho was listed on the National Register of Historic Places in 1982.

It is a one-and-one-half-story Colonial Revival stone house. It was during 1908-1910 by stonemason Alexander Whitehead using gray tuff stone from Menan Butte, with lighter tone stone used in quoins, sills, lintels, and the foundation. It has two brick chimneys.

It was home of Josiah Scott, a homesteader whose patent on the land was completed in 1893.

== See also ==
- List of National Historic Landmarks in Idaho
- National Register of Historic Places listings in Jefferson County, Idaho
