= JoAn Wood =

American politician from Idaho

Member of the Idaho House of Representatives from the 35th, Seat A district
- In office December 1981 – November 30, 2014
- Preceded by: Steven Hadley
- Succeeded by: Van Burtenshaw

Personal details
- Born: June 3, 1934 (age 92) Milo, Idaho
- Party: Republican
- Spouse: Thomas Wood
- Children: 5
- Occupation: Farmer, rancher, politician

JoAn Wood (born June 3, 1934) is a former American politician from Idaho. She was a Republican member of the Idaho House of Representatives who served consecutive terms for a total of 32 years.

== Early life ==
On June 3, 1934, Wood was born in Milo, Idaho.

She graduated from Ririe High School.

== Career ==
Wood is a farmer and rancher.

She was first elected to the Idaho House of Representatives in 1981, and served until 2014.

== Awards ==
- 2014 Water Statesman Award. Presented by Idaho Water Users Association (January 23, 2014).

== Personal life ==
Wood's husband was Thomas Wood. They have five children. Wood and her family live in Rigby, Idaho.

She is a Mormon.
