= Merrill Beyeler =

American politician, farmer, and educator from Idaho

Member of the Idaho House of Representatives from the District 8, seat B district
- In office December 1, 2014 – November 30, 2016
- Preceded by: Lenore Hardy Barrett
- Succeeded by: Dorothy Moon

Personal details
- Party: Republican
- Spouse: Sharal Beyeler
- Education: Boise State University
- Occupation: Politician, cattle farmer, educator

Merrill Beyeler is an American cattle farmer, former politician and former educator from Idaho. Beyeler was a Republican member of Idaho House of Representatives.

== Education ==
Beyeler earned a Bachelor of Arts degree in Education from Boise State University.

== Career ==
Beyeler is a former teacher.

Beyeler is a cattle farmer in Idaho.

On November 4. 2014, Beyeler won the election and became a Republican member of Idaho House of Representatives for District 8, seat B. Beyeler defeated Jocelyn Francis Plass and Mike Barrett with 66.3% of the votes.

== Awards ==
- 2013 Rangeland Stewardship Award. Bureau of Land Management.
- 2013 Pacific States Marine Fisheries Commission Annual Award.
- Lemhi Cattlemen and Horse Growers Association Rancher of the Year.

== Personal life ==
Beyeler's wife is Sharal Beyeler. They have five children. Beyeler and his family live in Leadore, Idaho.
