= Madison School District 321 =

School district in Idaho, United States

Address
- 60 West Main Street Rexburg, Idaho, 83440; United States

District information
- Type: Public
- Grades: PreK–12
- NCES District ID: 1601920

Students and staff
- Students: 5,370
- Teachers: 267.8
- Staff: 198.78
- Student–teacher ratio: 20.05

Other information
- Website: www.msd321.com

Madison School District #321 (MSD 321) is a school district headquartered in Rexburg, Idaho.

It includes the majority of the county, and almost all of Rexburg.

The district has five board members.

== Schools ==
Secondary

- Madison High School
- Central Alternative High School
- Madison Junior High School

Primary

- Madison Middle School
- Elementary:
  - Adams Elementary School
  - Burton Elementary School
  - Hibbard Elementary School
  - Kennedy Elementary School
  - Lincoln Elementary School
  - South Fork Elementary School

Former:

- Burton-Hibbard Elementary School
- Lyman Elementary School
