= Tanoa Togiai =

American football player (born 2001)

No. 62 – Washington Commanders
- Position: Guard
- Roster status: Active

Personal information
- Born: August 25, 2001 (age 25); Rigby, Idaho, U.S.
- Listed height: 6 ft 6 in (1.98 m)
- Listed weight: 321 lb (146 kg)

Career information
- High school: Rigby (Rigby, Idaho)
- College: Utah (2020–2025)
- NFL draft: 2026: undrafted

Career history
- Washington Commanders (2026–present)
- Stats at Pro Football Reference

Tanoa Togiai (born August 25, 2001) is an American professional football guard for the Washington Commanders of the National Football League (NFL). Togiai played college football for the Utah Utes and signed with the Commanders as an undrafted free agent in 2026.

== Professional career ==
Pre-draft measurables
| Height | Weight | Arm length | Hand span | Wingspan | 40-yard dash | 10-yard split | 20-yard split | 20-yard shuttle | Three-cone drill | Vertical jump | Broad jump | Bench press |
|---|---|---|---|---|---|---|---|---|---|---|---|---|
| 6 ft 5 3/4 in (1.97 m) | 317 lb (144 kg) | 33 1/2 in (0.85 m) | 9 1/2 in (0.24 m) | 6 ft 8 1/4 in (2.04 m) | 5.26 s | 1.75 s | 3.00 s | 4.76 s | 7.72 s | 29.0 in (0.74 m) | 9 ft 2 in (2.79 m) | 29 reps |
All values from Pro Day

Togiai signed with the Washington Commanders as an undrafted free agent on May 7, 2026.

== Personal life ==
Togiai is the cousin of NFL defensive tackle Tommy Togiai.
