= Camas National Wildlife Refuge =

National Wildlife Refuge in Idaho, US

- IUCN category IV (habitat/species management area)
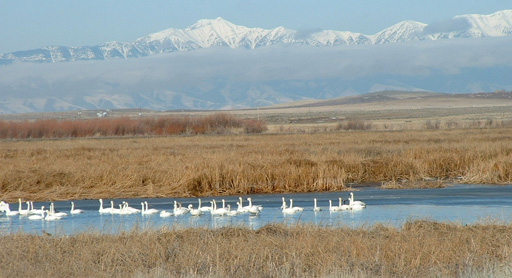

- Location within the United States
- Location: Jefferson County, Idaho, United States
- Nearest city: Hamer, Idaho
- Coordinates: 43.95129°N 112.24914°W
- Area: 10,578 acres (42.81 km^{2})
- Established: 1937
- Governing body: U.S. Fish and Wildlife Service
- Website: Camas National Wildlife Refuge

About half of the Camas National Wildlife Refuge in southeastern Idaho consists of lakes, ponds, and marshlands; the remainder is grass sagebrush uplands, meadows, and farm fields. Camas Creek flows through the length of the refuge.

Mammal species that inhabit this refuge are coyote, pronghorn, moose, elk, porcupine, white-tailed deer, cottontail rabbit, muskrat, and weasel.

Water management is a critical component of Camas Refuge operations. An extensive system of canals, dikes, wells, ponds, and water-control structures is used to manipulate water for the benefit of wildlife, with an emphasis on nesting waterfowl. Haying and prescribed fire are used to manipulate vegetation in some fields, and small grain crops are grown to provide supplemental feed for geese and cranes and to keep them from damaging private croplands.

== Geography ==
The refuge has a surface area of 10,578 acres (42.81 km^{2}).

== Climate ==
According to the Köppen Climate Classification system, Camas National Wildlife Refuge has a cold semi-arid climate, abbreviated "BSk" on climate maps. The hottest temperature recorded at the weather station in Hamer was 105 °F (40.6 °C) on July 20, 1960 and August 12, 1990, while the coldest temperature recorded was −48 °F (−44.4 °C) on January 1, 1979.

Climate data for Hamer, Idaho, 1991–2020 normals, extremes 1948–present
Month	Jan	Feb	Mar	Apr	May	Jun	Jul	Aug	Sep	Oct	Nov	Dec	Year
Record high °F (°C)	55 (13)	58 (14)	74 (23)	86 (30)	93 (34)	102 (39)	105 (41)	105 (41)	99 (37)	88 (31)	70 (21)	60 (16)	105 (41)
Mean maximum °F (°C)	40.9 (4.9)	46.3 (7.9)	63.3 (17.4)	76.0 (24.4)	84.3 (29.1)	90.7 (32.6)	96.3 (35.7)	95.5 (35.3)	89.5 (31.9)	77.5 (25.3)	59.5 (15.3)	44.4 (6.9)	97.2 (36.2)
Mean daily maximum °F (°C)	29.2 (−1.6)	35.5 (1.9)	48.9 (9.4)	60.4 (15.8)	70.0 (21.1)	78.9 (26.1)	88.7 (31.5)	87.4 (30.8)	77.5 (25.3)	61.6 (16.4)	43.8 (6.6)	30.1 (−1.1)	59.3 (15.2)
Daily mean °F (°C)	18.1 (−7.7)	23.4 (−4.8)	35.3 (1.8)	44.7 (7.1)	53.6 (12.0)	61.4 (16.3)	68.9 (20.5)	67.3 (19.6)	58.2 (14.6)	45.0 (7.2)	30.5 (−0.8)	19.6 (−6.9)	43.8 (6.6)
Mean daily minimum °F (°C)	6.9 (−13.9)	11.3 (−11.5)	21.7 (−5.7)	28.9 (−1.7)	37.2 (2.9)	43.9 (6.6)	49.2 (9.6)	47.1 (8.4)	38.9 (3.8)	28.4 (−2.0)	17.3 (−8.2)	9.2 (−12.7)	28.3 (−2.0)
Mean minimum °F (°C)	−17.9 (−27.7)	−11.6 (−24.2)	3.3 (−15.9)	13.6 (−10.2)	22.8 (−5.1)	31.0 (−0.6)	38.5 (3.6)	35.8 (2.1)	25.2 (−3.8)	11.6 (−11.3)	−2.5 (−19.2)	−15.1 (−26.2)	−23.0 (−30.6)
Record low °F (°C)	−48 (−44)	−46 (−43)	−27 (−33)	1 (−17)	14 (−10)	25 (−4)	28 (−2)	20 (−7)	8 (−13)	−8 (−22)	−38 (−39)	−40 (−40)	−48 (−44)
Average precipitation inches (mm)	0.72 (18)	0.44 (11)	0.50 (13)	0.94 (24)	1.47 (37)	1.11 (28)	0.52 (13)	0.51 (13)	0.63 (16)	0.73 (19)	0.56 (14)	0.80 (20)	8.93 (226)
Average snowfall inches (cm)	5.8 (15)	3.5 (8.9)	1.7 (4.3)	0.8 (2.0)	0.0 (0.0)	0.0 (0.0)	0.0 (0.0)	0.0 (0.0)	0.0 (0.0)	0.1 (0.25)	1.7 (4.3)	6.8 (17)	20.4 (51.75)
Average precipitation days (≥ 0.01 in)	6.3	4.9	4.0	6.3	7.3	5.9	3.5	3.7	3.9	4.3	4.5	6.4	61.0
Average snowy days (≥ 0.1 in)	5.0	3.3	0.8	0.4	0.0	0.0	0.0	0.0	0.0	0.2	1.7	4.7	16.1
Source 1: NOAA
Source 2: National Weather Service

== Bird habitat ==
During migration, which peaks in March–April and October, up to 50,000 ducks and 3,000 geese may be present on the refuge. Tundra and trumpeter swans visit in the hundreds during migration. Short-eared owls and long-billed curlews are commonly seen in this refuge. It has become a popular swan watching destination with hundreds of tundra and trumpeter swans stopping over during migration. Several state record songbird observations have been made in refuge cottonwood groves on the refuge.
