= Lenore Hardy Barrett =

American politician

Member of the Idaho House of Representatives
- In office December 1, 1992 – November 30, 2014
- Preceded by: Mike Simpson (redistricting)
- Succeeded by: Merrill Beyeler
- Constituency: 26th district Seat B (1992–2002); 35th district Seat B (2002–2012); 8th district Seat B (2012–2014)

Personal details
- Born: June 16, 1934 (age 92) Newkirk, Oklahoma
- Died: 2024
- Party: Republican
- Spouse: Robert Barrett (died 2010)
- Education: Oklahoma Baptist University
- Profession: former Director, Salmon River Electric

Lenore Hardy Barrett (born June 16, 1934) was a Republican member of the Idaho Legislature. Barrett served in the Idaho House of Representatives from 1992 to 2014.

== Education and career ==
Barrett graduated from Ponca City High School, Oklahoma, and earned her bachelor's degree from Oklahoma Baptist University in 1956. Barrett was a director of the Salmon River Electric co-operative. Barrett was a Police Commissioner and Challis City Council member from 1984-1989.

== Political career ==
Barrett held seat B in District 26 Seat B until 2002, when she was elected to seat B in Idaho House District 35. District 35. Following the 2010 census, she was redistricted into District 8 Seat B where she served until 2014.

== Committee assignments ==
Barrett was a member of these committees:

- Local Government (Chair)
- Resources and Conservation
- Revenue and Taxation

== Elections ==
=== Idaho House of Representatives District 26 Seat B ===
1992

1994

Re-elected with 8,913 votes (81.0%) against Donovan Bramwell (L).

1996

Re-elected with 10,088 votes (79.6%) against Donovan Bramwell (L).

1998

Re-elected with 7,772 votes (69.9%) against DelRay Holm (D).

2000

Re-elected with 9,992 votes (76.8%) against Kathy Richmond (D).

=== Idaho House of Representatives District 35 Seat B ===
2002

Redistricted to 35B; re-elected with 11,687 votes.

2004

Re-elected with 14,114 votes (98.8%) against write-in Jon Winegarner (I).

2006

Re-elected with 10,041 votes (72.09%) against Jon Winegarner (D).

2008

Barrett defeated Isaiah Womack in the Republican Primary with 71.3% of the vote.

Barrett was unopposed in the general election.

2010

Barrett defeated Robert E. Cope and Joel M. Lloyd in the Republican primary with 52.5%.

Barrett was unopposed in the general election.

=== Idaho House of Representatives District 8 Seat B ===
2012

Barrett defeated Merrill Beyeler, K. LaVon Dresen and Kenny Keene in the Republican primary with 37.1% of the vote.

Barrett defeated Cindy Phelps (D) in the general election with 63.8% of the vote.

Barrett endorsed Ron Paul in the Republican Party presidential primaries, 2012.

2014

Barrett was defeated for re-election in the Republican primary by Merrill Beyeler, only getting 34.2% of the vote.

== Personal life ==
Barrett has six children and resides in Challis, Idaho. Her husband Robert died in 2010.
