= Jefferson County School District 251 =

School district in Idaho, United States

Jefferson County Joint School District 251

Address
- 3850 East 300 North Rigby, Idaho, 83442; United States

Other information
- Website: www.jeffersonsd251.org

Jefferson County School District 251 is a school district headquartered in Rigby, Idaho.

It is mostly in Jefferson County. In addition to Rigby, the district includes Lewisville, Menan, and Roberts. It is also partially in Madison County.

== History ==
In 2015, the district had 5,106 students. In 2019, that number was up to 5,901. Luke O'Roark of the Post Register wrote in 2019 that the district is "one of the fastest growing school districts in the area."

Lisa Sherick served as superintendent until 2019. In 2019, Chad Martin became the superintendent.

=== 2021 shooting ===
On May 6, 2021, Rigby Middle School was the site of a school shooting that left two students and an adult injured. A female sixth-grader was taken into custody. In response, Governor of Idaho Brad Little tweeted, "I am praying for the lives and safety of those involved in today's tragic events. Thank you to our law enforcement agencies and school leaders for their efforts in responding to the incident."

== Education ==
7-12 schools

- Jefferson High School - Menan

High schools

- Rigby High School - Rigby

Middle schools

- Farnsworth Middle School - Rigby
- Rigby Middle School - Rigby

Elementary schools

- Cottonwood Elementary School - Rigby
- Harwood Elementary School - Rigby
- Jefferson Elementary School - Rigby
- Midway Elementary School - Menan
- Roberts Elementary School - Roberts
- South Fork Elementary School - Rigby
