= Van Burtenshaw =

American politician from Idaho

Member of the Idaho Senate from the 35th district
- Incumbent
- Assumed office December 1, 2018

Member of the Idaho House of Representatives from the 35th district
- In office December 1, 2014 – November 30, 2018
- Preceded by: JoAn Wood
- Succeeded by: Jerald Raymond

Personal details
- Born: 1957 or 1958 (age 68–69)
- Party: Republican
- Spouse: Joni Burtenshaw
- Children: 5
- Education: Ricks College (AA)

Van Burtenshaw is an American politician serving as a member of the Idaho Senate from the 35th district. He previously represented the same district in the Idaho House of Representatives.

== Education ==
He has an associate degree from Ricks College.

== Career ==
On November 4, 2014, Burtenshaw won the election unopposed and became a Republican member of the Idaho House of Representatives for District 35, seat A. On November 8, 2016, as an incumbent, Burtenshaw won the election unopposed and continued serving District 35, seat A.

On May 15, 2018, Burtenshaw won the Republican primary against Jud Miller 53.1% to 46.9%. On November 6, 2018, he won the general election for Idaho Senate for District 35, he was unopposed.

Burtenshaw is anti-abortion and a gun rights supporter.

== Personal life ==
Burtenshaw is married to his wife Joni and they have five children and 12 grandchildren. He is a farmer, rancher, and livestock dealer.
