= Lewisville, Idaho =

- City
- Location of Lewisville in Jefferson County, Idaho
- Coordinates: 43°41′45″N 112°0′50″W
- Country: United States
- State: Idaho
- County: Jefferson

Area
  - Total: 0.60 sq mi (1.56 km^{2})
  - Land: 0.60 sq mi (1.56 km^{2})
  - Water: 0 sq mi (0.00 km^{2})
- Elevation: 4,797 ft (1,462 m)

Population (2020)
  - Total: 421
  - Density: 861/sq mi (332.5/km^{2})
- Time zone: UTC-7 (Mountain (MST))
  - Summer (DST): UTC-7 (MDT)
- ZIP code: 83431
- Area code: 208
- FIPS code: 16-46720
- GNIS feature ID: 2410828
- Website: www.cityoflewisville.org

Lewisville is a city in Jefferson County, Idaho, United States. As of the 2020 census, Lewisville had a population of 421.

Lewisville is part of the Idaho Falls Metropolitan Statistical Area.

== History ==
Lewisville was established in 1882.

In 1960, Lewisville became the corporate headquarters of Idahoan Foods, a producer of dehydrated potato products such as instant mashed potatoes, potato casserole, and hash browns. In 2011, the headquarters was moved to Idaho Falls, 14 mi (23 km) south, though it still maintains its main plant in Lewisville.

For the city's important role in Idaho's potato industry, Governor Butch Otter proclaimed August 11, 2007 "Lewisville Day" statewide.

== Geography ==
According to the United States Census Bureau, the city has a total area of 0.63 square miles (1.63 km^{2}), all of it land.

== Demographics ==
Historical population
Census	Pop.	Note	%±
1910	346		—
1920	383		10.7%
1930	285		−25.6%
1940	371		30.2%
1950	402		8.4%
1960	385		−4.2%
1970	468		21.6%
1980	502		7.3%
1990	471		−6.2%
2000	467		−0.8%
2010	458		−1.9%
2020	421		−8.1%
2019 (est.)	520		13.5%
U.S. Decennial Census

As of 2000 the median income for a household in the city was $55,481, and the median income for a family was $56,442 . Males had a median income of $30,476 versus $12,115 for females. The per capita income for the city was $16,306. About 1.60% of families and 7.11% of the population were below the poverty line.

=== 2010 census ===
As of the census of 2010, there were 458 people, 159 households, and 129 families residing in the city. The population density was 732.52 inhabitants per square mile (282.83/km^{2}). There were 167 housing units at an average density of 265.8 units per square mile (102.6 units/km^{2}). The racial makeup of the city was 89.74% White, 11.35% Hispanic, 0.87% Native American, 0.44% Asian, 7.21% from other races, and 1.75% from two or more races.

There were 129 households, of which 34.6% had children under the age of 18 living with them, 66.7% were married couples living together, 9.4% had a female householder with no husband present, 5% had a male householder with no wife present. 16.4% had someone living alone who was 65 years of age or older. The average household size was 2.88 and the average family size was 3.19.

In the city, the population was spread out, with 28.6% under the age of 18, 7.3% from 18 to 24, 23.1% from 25 to 44, 25.8% from 45 to 64, and 15.2% who were 65 years of age or older. The median age was 34 years. For every 100 females, there were 105.7 males. For every 100 females age 18 and over, there were 102.5 males.

== Education ==
Lewisville is in Jefferson County School District 251. It is zoned to Midway Elementary School in Menan.
