= Ririe, Idaho =

- City
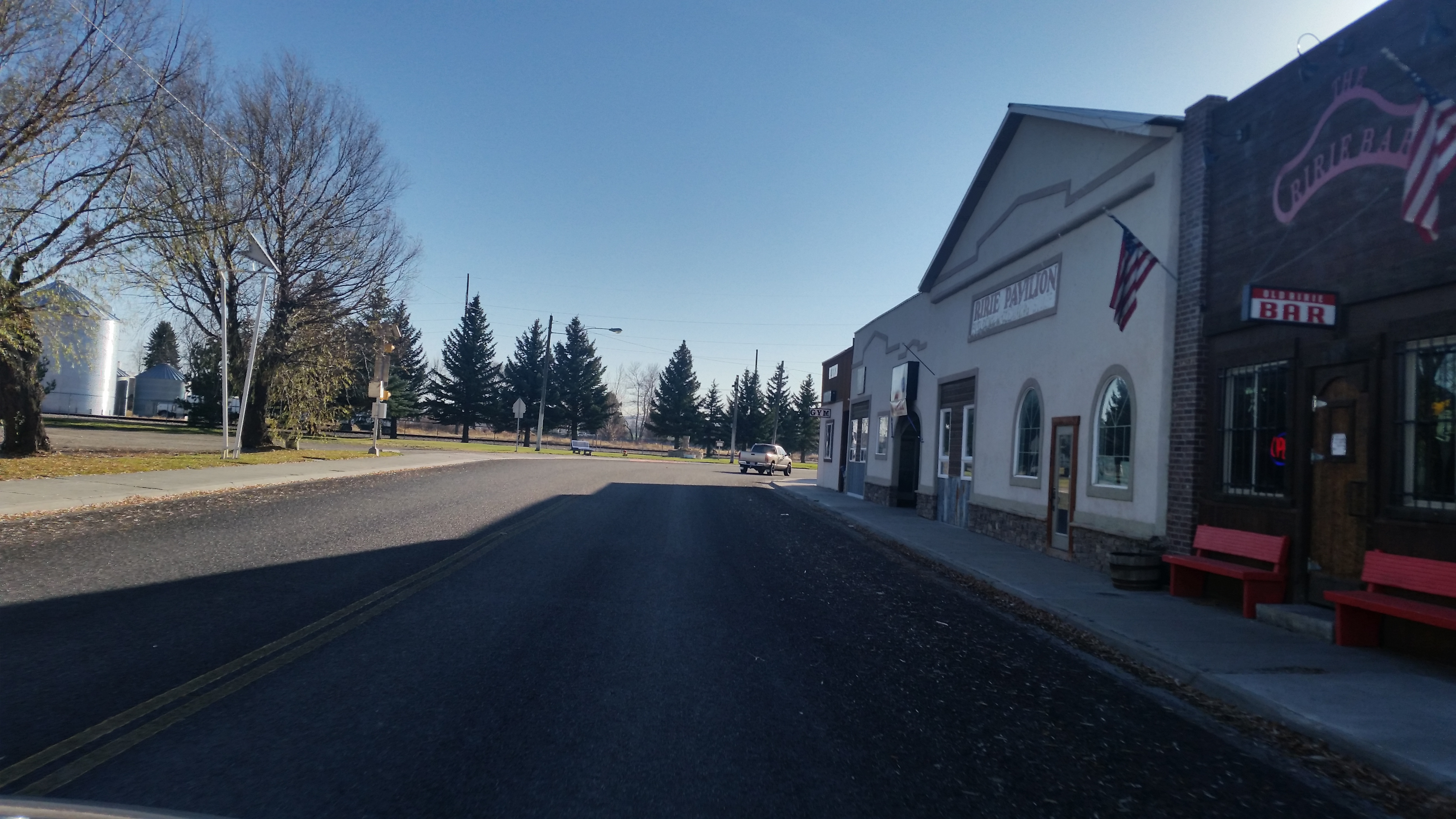
- Smith st. and Main st., town park on the left

- Location of Ririe in Bonneville County and Jefferson County, Idaho.
- Coordinates: 43°37′45″N 111°46′35″W
- Country: United States
- State: Idaho
- Counties: Jefferson, Bonneville

Area
  - Total: 0.53 sq mi (1.38 km^{2})
  - Land: 0.52 sq mi (1.34 km^{2})
  - Water: 0.015 sq mi (0.04 km^{2})
- Elevation: 4,967 ft (1,514 m)

Population (2020)
  - Total: 667
  - Density: 1,290/sq mi (498/km^{2})
- Time zone: UTC-7 (Mountain (MST))
  - Summer (DST): UTC-6 (MDT)
- ZIP code: 83443
- Area codes: 208, 986
- FIPS code: 16-67960
- GNIS feature ID: 2410958
- Website: cityofririe.com

Ririe is a city in Bonneville and Jefferson counties in the eastern part of the U.S. state of Idaho. It is part of the Idaho Falls metropolitan area. The population was 667 at the time of the 2020 census.

== History ==
The city of Ririe was named for one of its first homesteaders, David Ririe. A Utah resident, Ririe settled in the area in 1888 and began cultivating a small claim of land. In 1891, Joseph Hyrum Lovell and his family settled on an adjoining area and began farming. That winter, however, Joseph died of illness, leaving his family alone and isolated. David Ririe helped the widowed family to establish their farm, and eventually married one of the Lovell daughters, Leah Ann. The families flourished in the area, and David eventually built a large stone house, which stands today, to house his large family. As more residents settled in the area, the common need for schools and churches help foster a community. However, the city of Ririe was formally established in 1914. That year, the railroad was routed through the city and Ririe was given its name by railroad officials. The small community of Shelton was absorbed by Ririe, but several buildings and sites continue to bear the Shelton name, such as the Ririe-Shelton Cemetery.

A large fire in the summer of 1919 destroyed much of the southern half of the town, but since then, the elementary school/high school complex, an athletic field, and an LDS Stake Center have been built in the area. Since 2007, nearly a thousand acres (4 km^{2}) have been annexed into the town, ostensibly in anticipation of future development.

== Geography ==
According to the United States Census Bureau, the city has a total area of 0.50 square miles (1.29 km^{2}), of which, 0.49 square miles (1.27 km^{2}) is land and 0.01 square miles (0.03 km^{2}) is water.

== Culture ==
Ririe and its surrounding area are largely dependent on a farming economy. The major crops grown in the area are wheat, barley, alfalfa, and potatoes. Many community residents either farm their own land or work in some aspect of farm support, including supplying farm equipment, coordinating crop buyers, etc. In addition to those who farm, many residents work at the Idaho National Laboratory (a.k.a. "the Site"), a regional division of the Department of Energy that focuses on nuclear energy and security technology. Others work in various occupations in the surrounding communities.

Ririe is one of only three cities in Idaho situated astride county lines. Ririe is nearby to three larger cities--Idaho Falls, Rexburg, and Rigby, Idaho Falls and Rexburg both being about a half-hour away, and Rigby about 15 minutes away. These communities provide Ririe residents with easy access to shopping, restaurants, entertainment, and other city amenities.

Because of its unique location and small size, Ririe has become, in effect, a "bedroom" community with little retail commerce of its own. There have been several startup business attempts in the city, most failing within the first year or two. In addition to the several local grain elevators, the few small-town businesses that have succeeded are loyally supported. These include three gas stations, three restaurants, two convenience stores, a bank, an auto parts store, an auto repair shop, a metal design and fabrication shop, and one bar. The city also includes a post office, a senior citizen community center, a community library, a city park, and a community cemetery.

The community has a small independent public school system, consisting of the Ririe Elementary School complex located in the heart of the city, and the Ririe High School complex located just to the south of the city. Ririe also has its own community fire station, which provides volunteer EMS and fire-fighting to the area.

The predominant religion, The Church of Jesus Christ of Latter-day Saints, is widespread in city culture. The majority of city residents identify themselves as members, and two large church buildings serve as centers for many community activities. There is also a small non-denominational church in the community supported by a handful of loyal members.

Based in the heart of the Rocky Mountains and near the south fork of the Snake River, a large number of outdoor activities are available, including snowmobiling, hiking, skiing, snowboarding, hunting, boating, camping, and fishing. Heise Hot Springs, a local recreation area, provides facilities for golfing, camping and year-round swimming. The Kelly Canyon Ski Area, a small ski resort with 4 chairlifts, offers day and night skiing in the winter.

== Demographics ==
Historical population
Census	Pop.	Note	%±
1920	396		—
1930	422		6.6%
1940	493		16.8%
1950	527		6.9%
1960	560		6.3%
1970	575		2.7%
1980	555		−3.5%
1990	596		7.4%
2000	545		−8.6%
2010	656		20.4%
2020	667		1.7%
U.S. Decennial Census

=== 2010 census ===
As of the census of 2010, there were 656 people, 239 households, and 166 families residing in the city. The population density was 1,338.8 inhabitants per square mile (516.9/km^{2}). There were 267 housing units at an average density of 544.9 per square mile (210.4/km^{2}). The racial makeup of the city was 86.3% White, 1.1% Native American, 6.4% from other races, and 6.3% from two or more races. Hispanic or Latino of any race were 13.7% of the population.

There were 239 households, of which 43.5% had children under the age of 18 living with them, 50.6% were married couples living together, 12.1% had a female householder with no husband present, 6.7% had a male householder with no wife present, and 30.5% were non-families. 25.9% of all households were made up of individuals, and 11.3% had someone living alone who was 65 years of age or older. The average household size was 2.74 and the average family size was 3.34.

The median age in the city was 30.5 years. 33.4% of residents were under the age of 18; 9.4% were between the ages of 18 and 24; 23.8% were from 25 to 44; 22.4% were from 45 to 64; and 11% were 65 years of age or older. The gender makeup of the city was 48.6% male and 51.4% female.
