= Menan, Idaho =

- City
- Location of Menan in Jefferson County, Idaho.
- Coordinates: 43°43′18″N 111°59′52″W
- Country: United States
- State: Idaho
- County: Jefferson

Area
  - Total: 1.03 sq mi (2.67 km^{2})
  - Land: 1.03 sq mi (2.67 km^{2})
  - Water: 0 sq mi (0.00 km^{2})
- Elevation: 4,807 ft (1,465 m)

Population (2020)
  - Total: 715
  - Density: 779.0/sq mi (300.79/km^{2})
- Time zone: UTC-7 (Mountain (MST))
  - Summer (DST): UTC-6 (MDT)
- ZIP code: 83434
- Area code: 208
- FIPS code: 16-52030
- GNIS feature ID: 2411075
- Website: www.cityofmenan.org

Menan is a city in Jefferson County, Idaho, United States. It is part of the Idaho Falls, Idaho Metropolitan Statistical Area. As of the 2020 census, Menan had a population of 715.

== History ==
Menan was the first settlement of Latter-day Saints in the Snake River Valley. Founded in 1879, it was originally called "Pooles Island". This was later changed to Cedar Butte, and finally to Menan. According to local history, Menan is an Indian word meaning "Island".

== Geography ==
According to the United States Census Bureau, the city has a total area of 1.04 square miles (2.69 km^{2}), all of it land.

== Demographics ==
Historical population
Census	Pop.	Note	%±
1910	294		—
1920	393		33.7%
1930	384		−2.3%
1940	432		12.5%
1950	430		−0.5%
1960	496		15.3%
1970	545		9.9%
1980	605		11.0%
1990	601		−0.7%
2000	707		17.6%
2010	741		4.8%
2020	715		−3.5%
2019 (est.)	804		8.5%
U.S. Decennial Census

Menan is home to a large Fourth of July celebration every year. (Held on the 5th when the 4th is a Sunday). This celebration includes games, food, a duck race, and fun for all ages. The fireworks at dark rival, in height, Idaho Falls famous Melaleuca fireworks. As Menan is away from any airport, the size restrictions are negated. there are typically thousands of people who turn out from surrounding areas for this yearly celebration.

=== 2010 census ===
As of the census of 2010, there were 741 people, 259 households, and 200 families residing in the city. The population density was 712.5 inhabitants per square mile (275.1/km^{2}). There were 278 housing units at an average density of 267.3 per square mile (103.2/km^{2}). The racial makeup of the city was 92.3% White, 0.4% African American, 1.2% Native American, 4.0% from other races, and 2.0% from two or more races. Hispanic or Latino of any race were 10.4% of the population.

There were 259 households, of which 41.7% had children under the age of 18 living with them, 66.0% were married couples living together, 7.7% had a female householder with no husband present, 3.5% had a male householder with no wife present, and 22.8% were non-families. 18.1% of all households were made up of individuals, and 8.9% had someone living alone who was 65 years of age or older. The average household size was 2.86 and the average family size was 3.31.

The median age in the city was 33.5 years. 30.5% of residents were under the age of 18; 8.3% were between the ages of 18 and 24; 22.6% were from 25 to 44; 25.7% were from 45 to 64; and 12.8% were 65 years of age or older. The gender makeup of the city was 50.6% male and 49.4% female.

=== 2000 census ===
As of the census of 2000, there were 707 people, 220 households, and 187 families residing in the city. The population density was 745.0 inhabitants per square mile (287.6/km^{2}). There were 233 housing units at an average density of 245.5 per square mile (94.8/km^{2}). The racial makeup of the city was 87.13% White, 0.14% Native American, 0.14% Pacific Islander, 11.32% from other races, and 1.27% from two or more races. Hispanic or Latino of any race were 14.43% of the population.

There were 220 households, out of which 44.5% had children under the age of 18 living with them, 72.7% were married couples living together, 7.3% had a female householder with no husband present, and 15.0% were non-families. 11.4% of all households were made up of individuals, and 7.7% had someone living alone who was 65 years of age or older. The average household size was 3.21 and the average family size was 3.51.

In the city, the population was spread out, with 34.1% under the age of 18, 9.5% from 18 to 24, 24.2% from 25 to 44, 20.4% from 45 to 64, and 11.9% who were 65 years of age or older. The median age was 30 years. For every 100 females, there were 94.2 males. For every 100 females age 18 and over, there were 95.8 males.

The median income for a household in the city was $36,406, and the median income for a family was $40,357. Males had a median income of $29,531 versus $21,750 for females. The per capita income for the city was $13,464. About 7.3% of families and 11.9% of the population were below the poverty line, including 17.0% of those under age 18 and 6.1% of those age 65 or over.

== Education ==
It is within Jefferson County School District 251

- Jefferson High School (grades 7–12)
- Midway Elementary School

The Menan, Annis, Grant Public Library is in Menan.
