= Mud Lake, Idaho =

- City
- Location of Mud Lake in Jefferson County, Idaho.
- Coordinates: 43°50′34″N 112°28′46″W
- Country: United States
- State: Idaho
- County: Jefferson

Area
  - Total: 0.14 sq mi (0.37 km^{2})
  - Land: 0.14 sq mi (0.37 km^{2})
  - Water: 0 sq mi (0.00 km^{2})
- Elevation: 4,790 ft (1,460 m)

Population (2020)
  - Total: 321
  - Density: 2,942.4/sq mi (1,136.06/km^{2})
- Time zone: UTC-7 (Mountain (MST))
  - Summer (DST): UTC-6 (MDT)
- ZIP code: 83450
- Area code: 208
- FIPS code: 16-55450
- GNIS feature ID: 2411190

Mud Lake is a city in Jefferson County, Idaho, United States. It is part of the Idaho Falls, Idaho Metropolitan Statistical Area. The population was 358 at the 2010 census. Since then the population has grown to 419 as seen in the 2020 census.

Mud Lake is also home to a large lake (3094.9 acres).

== History ==
In 1919 the Latter-day Saint settlers in Mud Lake were organized into a branch.

Mud Lake made national news in 1981 when it had an infestation of jackrabbits.

On August 21, 2017, Mud Lake became part of the 'path of totality' during the total solar eclipse.

== Geography ==
According to the United States Census Bureau, the city has a total area of 0.16 square miles (0.41 km^{2}), all of it land.

== Demographics ==
Historical population
| Census | Pop. | Note | %± |
|---|---|---|---|
| 1960 | 187 | | — |
| 1970 | 194 | | 3.7% |
| 1980 | 243 | | 25.3% |
| 1990 | 179 | | −26.3% |
| 2000 | 270 | | 50.8% |
| 2010 | 358 | | 32.6% |
| 2020 | 321 | | −10.3% |
| 2019 (est.) | 419 | | 17.0% |
U.S. Decennial Census

=== 2010 census ===
As of the census of 2010, there were 358 people, 96 households, and 84 families residing in the city. The population density was 2,237.5 inhabitants per square mile (863.9/km^{2}). There were 107 housing units at an average density of 668.8 per square mile (258.2/km^{2}). The racial makeup of the city was 63.4% White, 1.1% Native American, 32.4% from other races, and 3.1% from two or more races. Hispanic or Latino of any race were 44.4% of the population.

There were 96 households, of which 63.5% had children under the age of 18 living with them, 66.7% were married couples living together, 15.6% had a female householder with no husband present, 5.2% had a male householder with no wife present, and 12.5% were non-families. 8.3% of all households were made up of individuals, and 2.1% had someone living alone who was 65 years of age or older. The average household size was 3.73 and the average family size was 4.01.

The median age in the city was 22.2 years. 45% of residents were under the age of 18; 7.8% were between the ages of 18 and 24; 24.8% were from 25 to 44; 18.4% were from 45 to 64; and 3.9% were 65 years of age or older. The gender makeup of the city was 48.3% male and 51.7% female.

=== 2000 census ===
As of the census of 2000, there were 270 people, 85 households, and 65 families residing in the city. The population density was 1,623.1 inhabitants per square mile (626.7/km^{2}). There were 91 housing units at an average density of 547.0 per square mile (211.2/km^{2}). The racial makeup of the city was 77.41% White, 0.37% Native American, 21.48% from other races, and 0.74% from two or more races. Hispanic or Latino of any race were 27.41% of the population.

There were 85 households, out of which 47.1% had children under the age of 18 living with them, 68.2% were married couples living together, 7.1% had a female householder with no husband present, and 23.5% were non-families. 18.8% of all households were made up of individuals, and 5.9% had someone living alone who was 65 years of age or older. The average household size was 3.18 and the average family size was 3.74.

In the city, the population was spread out, with 35.6% under the age of 18, 15.6% from 18 to 24, 24.1% from 25 to 44, 16.7% from 45 to 64, and 8.1% who were 65 years of age or older. The median age was 24 years. For every 100 females, there were 123.1 males. For every 100 females age 18 and over, there were 107.1 males.

The median income for a household in the city was $28,194, and the median income for a family was $29,583. Males had a median income of $30,938 versus $16,250 for females. The per capita income for the city was $11,159. About 21.7% of families and 24.8% of the population were below the poverty line, including 22.4% of those under the age of eighteen and 15.8% of those 65 or over.

== See also ==
- List of cities in Idaho
