= Roberts, Idaho =

- City
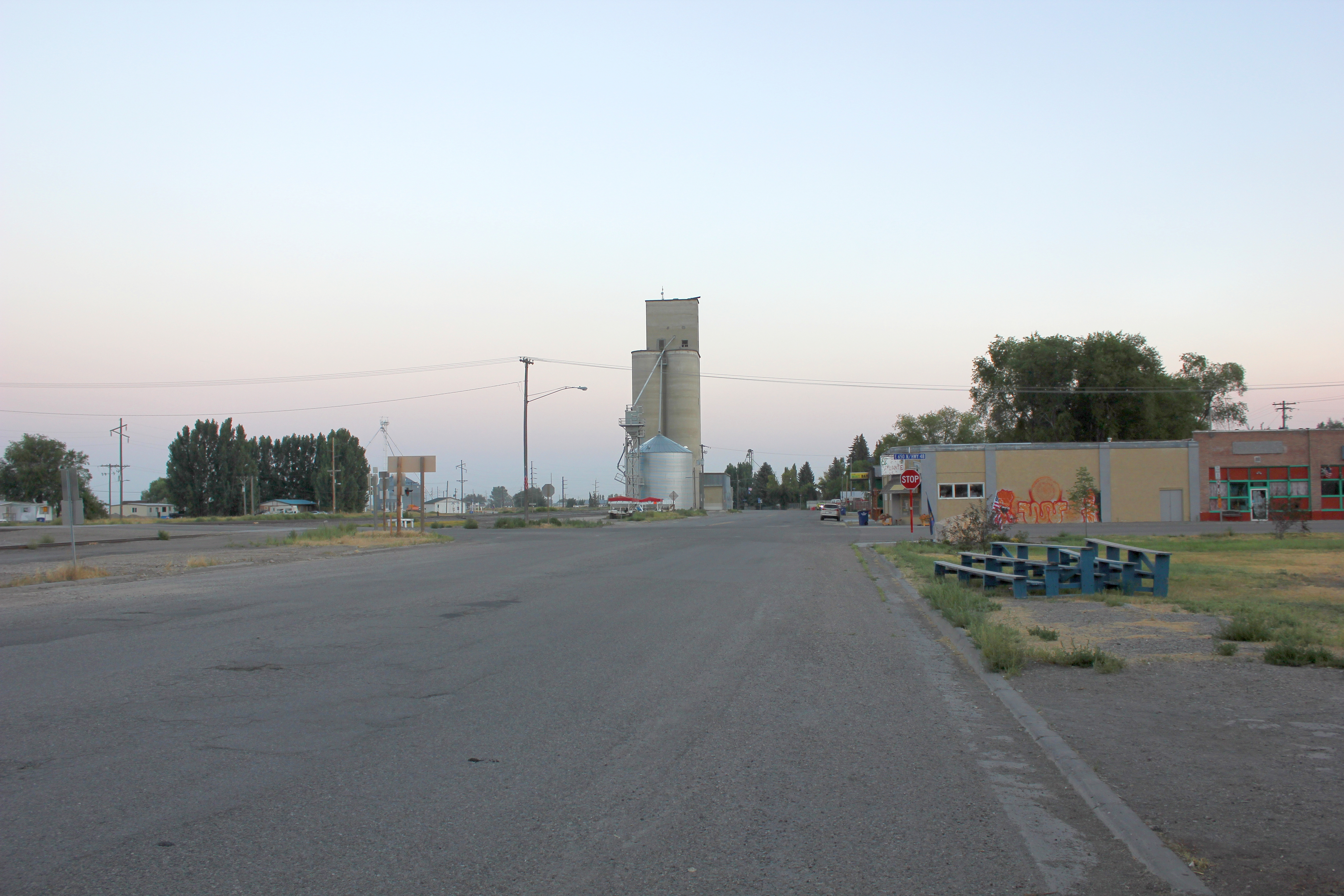
- North Bassett Road in Roberts

- Location of Roberts in Jefferson County, Idaho.
- Coordinates: 43°43′07″N 112°07′34″W
- Country: United States
- State: Idaho
- County: Jefferson

Area
  - Total: 0.32 sq mi (0.84 km^{2})
  - Land: 0.31 sq mi (0.81 km^{2})
  - Water: 0.0077 sq mi (0.02 km^{2})
- Elevation: 4,777 ft (1,456 m)

Population (2020)
  - Total: 500
  - Density: 2,031.3/sq mi (784.28/km^{2})
- Time zone: UTC-7 (Mountain (MST))
  - Summer (DST): UTC-6 (MDT)
- ZIP code: 83444
- Area code: 208
- FIPS code: 16-68500
- GNIS feature ID: 2410971
- Website: cityofrobertsidaho.gov

Roberts is a city in Jefferson County, Idaho, United States. It is part of the Idaho Falls, Idaho Metropolitan Statistical Area. As of the 2020 census, Roberts had a population of 500.

== Geography ==
According to the United States Census Bureau, the city has a total area of 0.31 square miles (0.80 km^{2}), of which, 0.30 square miles (0.78 km^{2}) is land and 0.01 square miles (0.03 km^{2}) is water.

== Demographics ==
Historical population
Census	Pop.	Note	%±
1910	192		—
1920	313		63.0%
1930	297		−5.1%
1940	319		7.4%
1950	341		6.9%
1960	422		23.8%
1970	393		−6.9%
1980	466		18.6%
1990	557		19.5%
2000	647		16.2%
2010	580		−10.4%
2020	500		−13.8%
2019 (est.)	637		9.8%
U.S. Decennial Census

As of 2000 the median income for a household in the city was $31,071, and the median income for a family was $33,125. Males had a median income of $28,750 versus $17,000 for females. The per capita income for the city was $11,100. About 12.6% of families and 18.9% of the population were below the poverty line, including 22.8% of those under age 18 and 7.9% of those age 65 or over.

=== 2010 census ===
As of the census of 2010, there were 580 people, 179 households, and 141 families residing in the city. The population density was 1,933.3 inhabitants per square mile (746.5/km^{2}). There were 192 housing units at an average density of 640.0 per square mile (247.1/km^{2}). The racial makeup of the city was 62.6% White, 0.5% African American, 1.0% Native American, 1.2% Asian, 31.6% from other races, and 3.1% from two or more races. Hispanic or Latino of any race were 52.4% of the population.

There were 179 households, of which 49.7% had children under the age of 18 living with them, 57.5% were married couples living together, 16.2% had a female householder with no husband present, 5.0% had a male householder with no wife present, and 21.2% were non-families. 19.0% of all households were made up of individuals, and 10.6% had someone living alone who was 65 years of age or older. The average household size was 3.24 and the average family size was 3.76.

The median age in the city was 28.1 years. 34.5% of residents were under the age of 18; 10.5% were between the ages of 18 and 24; 25.2% were from 25 to 44; 21.1% were from 45 to 64; and 8.8% were 65 years of age or older. The gender makeup of the city was 52.4% male and 47.6% female.

== Economy ==
Roberts has a general store, a café, a restaurant, and a gas station.

== Education ==
It is within Jefferson County School District 251. Roberts Elementary School is in the town.

It also has a library.
