= Rigby, Idaho =

City in Jefferson County, Idaho

- City
- Nickname: The Birthplace of Television
- Mottoes: Honoring our Heritage, Looking to the Future
- Location of Rigby in Jefferson County, Idaho

- Location in the United States
- Coordinates: 43°40′24″N 111°54′48″W
- Country: United States
- State: Idaho
- County: Jefferson
- Named for: William F. Rigby

Area
  - Total: 2.37 sq mi (6.13 km^{2})
  - Land: 2.36 sq mi (6.10 km^{2})
  - Water: 0.012 sq mi (0.03 km^{2})
- Elevation: 4,856 ft (1,480 m)

Population (2020)
  - Total: 5,038
  - Estimate (2022): 5,452
  - Density: 1,822.1/sq mi (703.52/km^{2})
- Time zone: UTC-7 (Mountain (MST))
  - Summer (DST): UTC-6 (MDT)
- ZIP code: 83442
- Area code: 208
- FIPS code: 16-67780
- GNIS feature ID: 2410948
- Website: cityofrigby.gov

Rigby is a city in and the county seat of Jefferson County, Idaho, United States. The population was 5,038 at the 2020 census, up from 3,945 in 2010.

== History ==
Native Americans from the Shoshone, Bannock Blackfeet, and Nez Perce tribes were the first inhabitants of the region.

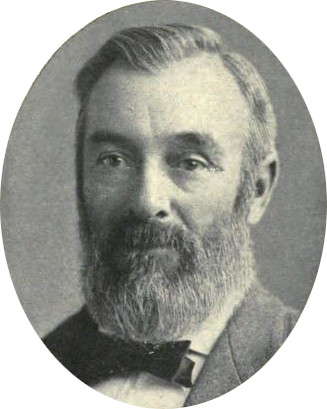
William F. Rigby, namesake of Rigby, Idaho

Rigby was founded by George Albert Cordon, Omer Samuel Call, Josiah Call, and Cyril Josiah Call, members of the Church of Jesus Christ of Latter-day Saints, in 1884 and incorporated in 1903. The community was named after William F. Rigby, a prominent early settler and member of the church.

== Demographics ==
Historical population
Census	Pop.	Note	%±
1910	666		—
1920	1,629		144.6%
1930	1,531		−6.0%
1940	1,978		29.2%
1950	1,826		−7.7%
1960	2,281		24.9%
1970	2,324		1.9%
1980	2,624		12.9%
1990	2,681		2.2%
2000	2,998		11.8%
2010	3,945		31.6%
2020	5,038		27.7%
2022 (est.)	5,452		8.2%
U.S. Decennial Census

=== 2020 census ===
As of the 2020 census, Rigby had a population of 5,038. The median age was 28.5 years. 31.7% of residents were under the age of 18 and 11.4% of residents were 65 years of age or older. For every 100 females there were 97.4 males, and for every 100 females age 18 and over there were 94.1 males age 18 and over.

98.9% of residents lived in urban areas, while 1.1% lived in rural areas.

There were 1,738 households in Rigby, of which 42.1% had children under the age of 18 living in them. Of all households, 53.3% were married-couple households, 15.1% were households with a male householder and no spouse or partner present, and 26.4% were households with a female householder and no spouse or partner present. About 24.0% of all households were made up of individuals and 10.1% had someone living alone who was 65 years of age or older.

There were 1,825 housing units, of which 4.8% were vacant. The homeowner vacancy rate was 0.4% and the rental vacancy rate was 5.0%.

Racial composition as of the 2020 census
Race	Number	Percentage
White	4,197	83.3%
Black or African American	16	0.3%
American Indian and Alaska Native	47	0.9%
Asian	17	0.3%
Native Hawaiian and Other Pacific Islander	10	0.2%
Some other race	324	6.4%
Two or more races	427	8.5%
Hispanic or Latino (of any race)	700	13.9%

=== 2010 census ===
As of the census of 2010, there were 3,945 people, 1,328 households, and 994 families living in the city. The population density was 1,678.7 inhabitants per square mile (648.1/km^{2}). There were 1,428 housing units at an average density of 607.7 per square mile (234.6/km^{2}). The racial makeup of the city was 89.5% White, 0.2% African American, 0.9% Native American, 0.5% Asian, 0.2% Pacific Islander, 6.7% from other races, and 2.1% from two or more races. Hispanic or Latino of any race were 11.8% of the population.

There were 1,328 households, of which 45.3% had children under the age of 18 living with them, 57.0% were married couples living together, 13.3% had a female householder with no husband present, 4.5% had a male householder with no wife present, and 25.2% were non-families. 21.8% of all households were made up of individuals, and 9% had someone living alone who was 65 years of age or older. The average household size was 2.91 and the average family size was 3.43.

The median age in the city was 27.6 years. 34.3% of residents were under the age of 18; 10.3% were between the ages of 18 and 24; 28.5% were from 25 to 44; 16.5% were from 45 to 64; and 10.3% were 65 years of age or older. The gender makeup of the city was 47.4% male and 52.6% female.

=== 2000 census ===
As of the census of 2000, there were 2,998 people, 1,051 households, and 789 families living in the city. The population density was 2,935.3 inhabitants per square mile (1,133.3/km^{2}). There were 1,107 housing units at an average density of 1,083.9 per square mile (418.5/km^{2}). The racial makeup of the city was 91.16% White, 0.43% African American, 0.87% Native American, 0.40% Asian, 0.07% Pacific Islander, 5.64% from other races, and 1.43% from two or more races. Hispanic or Latino of any race were 11.67% of the population.

There were 1,051 households, out of which 42.8% had children under the age of 18 living with them, 60.2% were married couples living together, 11.7% had a female householder with no husband present, and 24.9% were non-families. 22.7% of all households were made up of individuals, and 12.5% had someone living alone who was 65 years of age or older. The average household size was 2.83 and the average family size was 3.36.

In the city, the population was spread out, with 33.7% under the age of 18, 11.4% from 18 to 24, 24.2% from 25 to 44, 17.4% from 45 to 64, and 13.4% who were 65 years of age or older. The median age was 28 years. For every 100 females, there were 91.8 males. For every 100 females age 18 and over, there were 88.2 males.

The median income for a household in the city was $30,192, and the median income for a family was $36,417. Males had a median income of $32,316 versus $18,269 for females. The per capita income for the city was $12,795. About 10.5% of families and 12.1% of the population were below the poverty line, including 13.2% of those under age 18 and 10.0% of those age 65 or over.

== Geography ==
Rigby is at an elevation of 4,856 feet (1,480 m) above sea level.

According to the United States Census Bureau, the city has a total area of 2.36 square miles (6.11 km^{2}), of which, 2.35 square miles (6.09 km^{2}) is land and 0.01 square miles (0.03 km^{2}) is water.

Many tributaries of the Snake River run through the Rigby area including the Henry’s Fork, South Fork, and others. With the large amount of water, Jefferson County surrounding Rigby is home to the largest cottonwood forest west of the Mississippi River.

=== Climate ===
According to the Köppen climate classification, Rigby has a warm-summer or dry hot-summer humid continental climate.

Climate data for Rigby, Idaho, 1991–2020 normals, extremes 2008–present
Month	Jan	Feb	Mar	Apr	May	Jun	Jul	Aug	Sep	Oct	Nov	Dec	Year
Record high °F (°C)	49 (9)	60 (16)	71 (22)	85 (29)	87 (31)	96 (36)	97 (36)	95 (35)	96 (36)	85 (29)	70 (21)	57 (14)	97 (36)
Mean daily maximum °F (°C)	30.7 (−0.7)	35.4 (1.9)	47.9 (8.8)	57.1 (13.9)	66.7 (19.3)	75.0 (23.9)	84.5 (29.2)	84.3 (29.1)	74.9 (23.8)	59.7 (15.4)	43.1 (6.2)	29.9 (−1.2)	57.4 (14.1)
Daily mean °F (°C)	22.8 (−5.1)	26.6 (−3.0)	37.7 (3.2)	45.0 (7.2)	54.1 (12.3)	61.6 (16.4)	69.5 (20.8)	68.9 (20.5)	60.5 (15.8)	47.2 (8.4)	34.2 (1.2)	22.8 (−5.1)	45.9 (7.7)
Mean daily minimum °F (°C)	14.9 (−9.5)	17.7 (−7.9)	27.5 (−2.5)	33.0 (0.6)	41.5 (5.3)	48.2 (9.0)	54.6 (12.6)	53.5 (11.9)	46.0 (7.8)	34.8 (1.6)	25.2 (−3.8)	15.7 (−9.1)	34.4 (1.3)
Record low °F (°C)	−23 (−31)	−14 (−26)	−3 (−19)	14 (−10)	22 (−6)	32 (0)	39 (4)	38 (3)	28 (−2)	−1 (−18)	−7 (−22)	−16 (−27)	−23 (−31)
Average precipitation inches (mm)	1.32 (34)	0.78 (20)	1.12 (28)	1.44 (37)	1.80 (46)	1.30 (33)	0.56 (14)	0.78 (20)	1.09 (28)	1.19 (30)	0.79 (20)	1.31 (33)	13.48 (343)
Source 1: NOAA
Source 2: National Weather Service

== Economy ==
Many Rigby citizens commute to jobs in Rexburg or Idaho Falls, and a number of residents work for the federal government or federal contractors through the Idaho National Laboratory (INL), locally called "The Site".

== Arts and culture ==
The Farnsworth TV & Pioneer Museum has Philo Farnsworth's television-related work, including an original TV tube he developed, on display.

77.1% of Rigby's residents, as well as those of the outlying communities, are members of the Church of Jesus Christ of Latter-Day Saints. A 1% of the population is of the Baptist, Presbyterian, or Lutheran faith. And while 0.5% of Rigby residents are Catholic there is no Catholic Church within the city. Residents that are not religiously affiliated, Atheist, or Pentecostal make up 21% of the population of Rigby. Judaism, Islam, and other Eastern religions have no presence in the population of Rigby.

== Education ==
Jefferson County School District 251 is the local school district. Rigby High School is the primary high school within the city, serving grades 9–12. Jefferson High School exists as an alternative high school for high-need students. Rigby Middle School and Philo T. Farnsworth Middle School serve grades 6–8. "Trojans" is the mascot for both of the middle schools and Rigby High School; the team colors are maroon and gold. The community supports six elementary schools: Cottonwood Elementary, Midway Elementary, South Fork Elementary, Jefferson Elementary, Roberts Elementary, and Harwood Elementary. There is also the Rigby Virtual Academy serving K–8 and the Early Childhood Center serving special needs aged 3–5. These schools also serve residents from neighboring areas such as Menan, Lewisville, and Roberts. Rigby has a long-standing rivalry with Madison.

Rigby High School currently has 10 state titles in Boys Basketball, and in 2019 won their first state title in football, defeating Coeur d'Alene 57-56 in double overtime. The two schools had previously played in week one of the same season, with Coeur d'Alene winning. In the 2024-25 football season state championships, they won against Eagle, the result was a win 41-21. In the 2025-26 football season state championship, the Rigby Trojans won against the Timberline Wolves 41-0. The Trojans were back-to-back 6A football state champions.

== Notable people ==
- Philo Farnsworth, inventor and early television pioneer
- Vardis Fisher, author
- Gail Halvorsen, retired Air Force pilot
- Brent Hill, politician
- Miranda Hope, The Secret Lives of Mormon Wives cast member
- H. Rex Lee, 44th and 50th governor of American Samoa
- Wayne Quinton, inventor of the treadmill and biomedical devices
- Larry Wilson, Pro Football Hall of Fame NFL player

== See also ==
- List of cities in Idaho
