= Jefferson County, Idaho =

County in Idaho, United States

- County
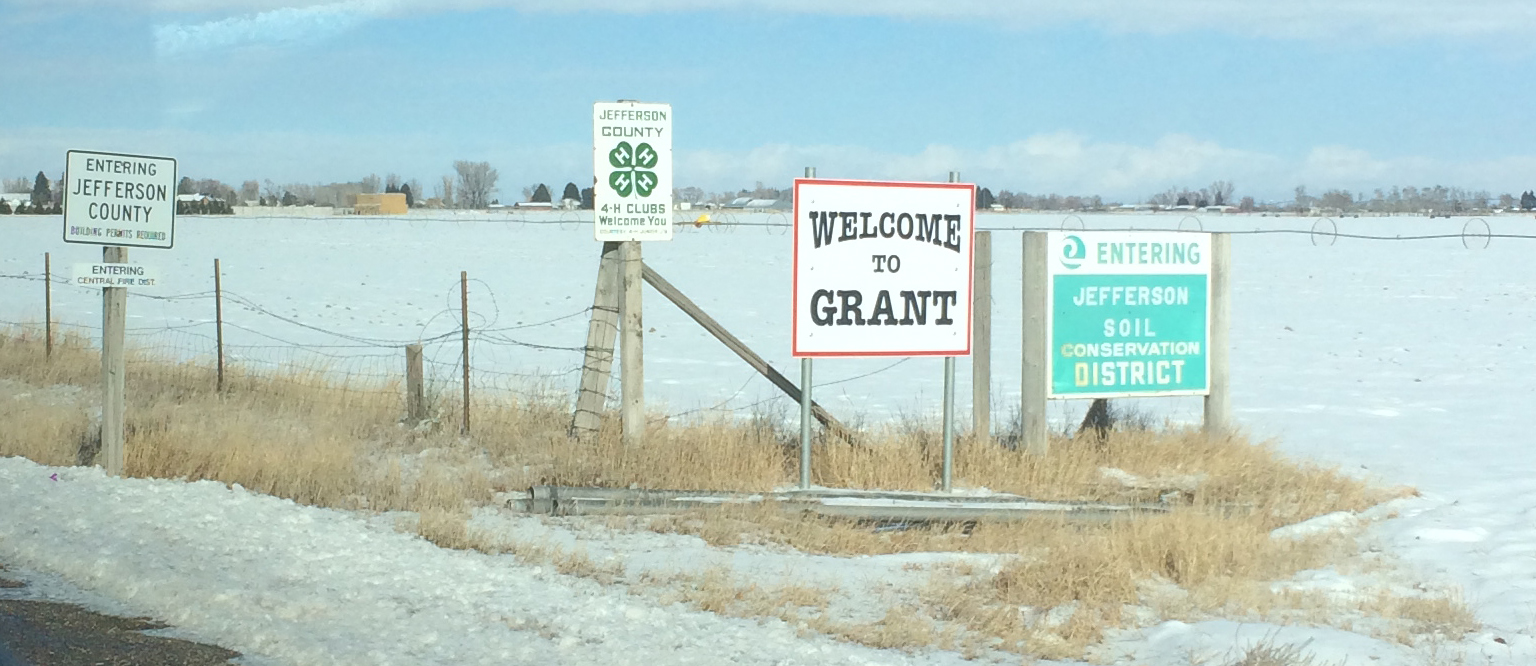
- Entering Jefferson County in Grant, Idaho

- Seal

- Location within the U.S. state of Idaho
- Coordinates: 43°49′N 112°19′W
- Country: United States
- State: Idaho
- Founded: February 18, 1913
- Named for: Thomas Jefferson
- Seat: Rigby
- Largest city: Rigby

Area
  - Total: 1,106 sq mi (2,860 km^{2})
  - Land: 1,094 sq mi (2,830 km^{2})
  - Water: 12 sq mi (31 km^{2}) 1.1%

Population (2020)
  - Total: 30,891
  - Estimate (2025): 35,297 ▲
  - Density: 28.24/sq mi (10.90/km^{2})
- Time zone: UTC−7 (Mountain)
  - Summer (DST): UTC−6 (MDT)
- Congressional district: 2nd
- Website: www.jcgov.us

Jefferson County is a county located in the U.S. state of Idaho. As of the 2020 Census, the county's population was 30,891. The county seat and largest city is Rigby. The county was established in 1913 and named after Thomas Jefferson, the third U.S. President. Jefferson County is part of the Idaho Falls metropolitan area.

== Geography ==
According to the U.S. Census Bureau, the county has a total area of 1,106 square miles (2,860 km^{2}), of which 1,094 square miles (2,830 km^{2}) is land and 12 square miles (31 km^{2}) (1.1%) is water.

== History ==
The Salt Lake City to Virginia City Stagecoach was established through the area in 1864. Stops were established at Market Lake (Roberts), Sand Hole (Hamer), and Camas. Small settlements grew up around the stagecoach stops with the most significant development occurring at Market Lake. The county's first post office was established at Market Lake on July 29, 1868, when the post office at Eagle Rock was relocated there. Initial settlement at Mud Lake also originated in 1868.

The Utah and Northern Railway reached Camas on July 3, 1879, bringing with it a new wave of settlement, particularly at Camas and Market Lake. Mormon settlement of the county began when John R Poole settled the Menan area in April 1879 with the settlement initially named Poole's Island. Settlement followed at Lewisville in 1882, Rigby in 1883 and Ririe in 1888. The Camas and Market Lake precincts are the first to emerge in census data under Bingham County in 1890. At that point, 379 residents were enumerated in the Camas precinct and Market Lake counted 218. By the 1900 census, precincts were added for Lewisville, Menan, Rigby, and Rudy (located between Ririe and Rigby). Together with Camas and Market Lake precincts, they contained a population of 3,046. By 1910 there were 10 precincts that would become part of Jefferson County three years later with additional precincts added for Grant, Hamer, Labelle, and Lorenzo. The 1910 census population for those precincts was 5,535.

A common characteristic of Jefferson County's early settlements was their reliance upon a series of canals to deliver water from the Snake River. The first of these systems commenced at Menan in 1880 with construction of the Long Island Canal. The Butte-Market Lake Canal originated in 1884 with construction starting on the big Feeder Canal in 1895. The Owlsey Canal in western Jefferson County had its origins April 13, 1909.

At the time of the first settlement in 1864, the territory east of the Snake River was part of Oneida County with the remainder being part of Alturas County. Mud Lake became the defining point for Oneida County's boundary with Alturas County in 1877 with a portion of the western boundary changed to a line drawn north from a point on the Snake River due south of the "sink of Camas Creek". The change transferred settlements at Camas and Market Lake to Oneida County. Bingham County was created in 1885 from Oneida County with no change in the boundary of Alturas until 1889 when the rest of the Mud Lake area was transferred to Bingham County. All of present Jefferson County became part of Fremont at its creation in 1893. After its creation in 1913, Jefferson County quickly took its present shape in 1917 at the formation of Butte County.

Census data indicates Lewisville became the county's first incorporated village in 1904. It was followed by Rigby in 1906, Menan in 1907 and Roberts in 1910. Ririe was incorporated by 1920 with Hamer and Mud Lake incorporated after 1950.

=== Adjacent counties ===
- Clark County - north
- Fremont County - northeast
- Madison County - east
- Bonneville County - south
- Bingham County - southwest
- Butte County - west

=== Major highways ===
- Interstate 15
- US 20
- SH-22
- SH-28
- SH-33
- SH-48

=== National protected area ===
- Camas National Wildlife Refuge
- Targhee National Forest (part)

== Demographics ==
Historical population
Census	Pop.	Note	%±
1920	9,441		—
1930	9,171		−2.9%
1940	10,762		17.3%
1950	10,495		−2.5%
1960	11,672		11.2%
1970	11,619		−0.5%
1980	15,304		31.7%
1990	16,543		8.1%
2000	19,155		15.8%
2010	26,140		36.5%
2020	30,891		18.2%
2025 (est.)	35,297	▲	14.3%
1790–1960, 1900–1990, 1990–2000, 2010, 2020

=== Racial and ethnic composition ===
Jefferson County, Idaho – Racial and ethnic composition Note: the US Census treats Hispanic/Latino as an ethnic category. This table excludes Latinos from the racial categories and assigns them to a separate category. Hispanics/Latinos may be of any race.
Race / Ethnicity (NH = Non-Hispanic)	Pop 1980	Pop 1990	Pop 2000	Pop 2010	Pop 2020	% 1980	% 1990	% 2000	% 2010	% 2020
White alone (NH)	14,446	15,219	16,955	22,925	26,430	94.39%	92.00%	88.51%	87.70%	85.56%
Black or African American alone (NH)	1	3	21	40	73	0.01%	0.02%	0.11%	0.15%	0.24%
Native American or Alaska Native alone (NH)	125	109	80	132	127	0.82%	0.66%	0.42%	0.50%	0.41%
Asian alone (NH)	26	40	43	103	118	0.17%	0.24%	0.22%	0.39%	0.38%
Native Hawaiian or Pacific Islander alone (NH)	x	x	13	22	30	x	x	0.07%	0.08%	0.10%
Other race alone (NH)	18	17	7	19	106	0.12%	0.10%	0.04%	0.07%	0.34%
Mixed race or Multiracial (NH)	x	x	129	258	751	x	x	0.67%	0.99%	2.43%
Hispanic or Latino (any race)	688	1,155	1,907	2,641	3,256	4.50%	6.98%	9.96%	10.10%	10.54%
Total	15,304	16,543	19,155	26,140	30,891	100.00%	100.00%	100.00%	100.00%	100.00%

=== 2020 census ===
As of the 2020 census, the county had a population of 30,891. The median age was 32.1 years. 34.1% of residents were under the age of 18 and 12.1% of residents were 65 years of age or older. For every 100 females there were 101.8 males, and for every 100 females age 18 and over there were 101.3 males age 18 and over.

The racial makeup of the county was 87.7% White, 0.3% Black or African American, 0.7% American Indian and Alaska Native, 0.4% Asian, 0.1% Native Hawaiian and Pacific Islander, 5.6% from some other race, and 5.2% from two or more races. Hispanic or Latino residents of any race comprised 10.5% of the population.

33.3% of residents lived in urban areas, while 66.7% lived in rural areas.

There were 9,581 households in the county, of which 43.9% had children under the age of 18 living with them and 15.3% had a female householder with no spouse or partner present. About 16.2% of all households were made up of individuals and 7.4% had someone living alone who was 65 years of age or older.

There were 10,134 housing units, of which 5.5% were vacant. Among occupied housing units, 82.7% were owner-occupied and 17.3% were renter-occupied. The homeowner vacancy rate was 0.7% and the rental vacancy rate was 6.9%.

=== 2010 census ===
As of the 2010 United States census, there were 26,140 people, 8,146 households, and 6,698 families living in the county. The population density was 23.9 inhabitants per square mile (9.2/km^{2}). There were 8,722 housing units at an average density of 8.0 units per square mile (3.1 units/km^{2}). The racial makeup of the county was 91.2% white, 0.8% American Indian, 0.4% Asian, 0.2% black or African American, 0.1% Pacific islander, 5.8% from other races, and 1.5% from two or more races. Those of Hispanic or Latino origin made up 10.1% of the population. In terms of ancestry, 31.4% were English, 13.9% were German, 8.2% were American, 5.9% were Danish, and 5.3% were Irish.

Of the 8,146 households, 47.7% had children under the age of 18 living with them, 70.6% were married couples living together, 7.4% had a female householder with no husband present, 17.8% were non-families, and 15.0% of all households were made up of individuals. The average household size was 3.20 and the average family size was 3.57. The median age was 30.0 years.

The median income for a household in the county was $51,579 and the median income for a family was $55,705. Males had a median income of $42,177 versus $27,314 for females. The per capita income for the county was $19,019. About 7.7% of families and 10.2% of the population were below the poverty line, including 11.7% of those under age 18 and 9.0% of those age 65 or over.

=== 2000 census ===
As of the census of 2000, there were 19,155 people, 5,901 households, and 4,880 families living in the county. The population density was 18 people per square mile (6.9 people/km^{2}). There were 6,287 housing units at an average density of 6 units per square mile (2.3 units/km^{2}). The racial makeup of the county was 90.87% White, 0.28% Black or African American, 0.46% Native American, 0.23% Asian, 0.08% Pacific Islander, 6.76% from other races, and 1.33% from two or more races. 9.96% of the population were Hispanic or Latino of any race. 32.7 were of English, 10.9% German and 9.2% American ancestry.

There were 5,901 households, out of which 47.60% had children under the age of 18 living with them, 72.60% were married couples living together, 6.80% had a female householder with no husband present, and 17.30% were non-families. 15.20% of all households were made up of individuals, and 7.40% had someone living alone who was 65 years of age or older. The average household size was 3.23 and the average family size was 3.62.

In the county, the population was spread out, with 36.30% under the age of 18, 9.60% from 18 to 24, 25.50% from 25 to 44, 19.30% from 45 to 64, and 9.30% who were 65 years of age or older. The median age was 29 years. For every 100 females there were 102.20 males. For every 100 females age 18 and over, there were 101.00 males.

The median income for a household in the county was $37,737, and the median income for a family was $41,530. Males had a median income of $31,298 versus $19,755 for females. The per capita income for the county was $13,838. About 8.00% of families and 10.40% of the population were below the poverty line, including 13.00% of those under age 18 and 8.70% of those age 65 or over.

== Politics ==
Jefferson County is an overwhelmingly Republican and conservative county. The last Democrat who carried the county in a presidential election was Harry S. Truman in 1948. In 2012 President Obama received just 11.4 percent of the vote. In the 1972 presidential election, Richard Nixon won the county, with then John Birch Society member John G. Schmitz receiving 27.51 percent of the county's vote. The last Democratic candidate to receive more than twenty percent of the county's vote was Jimmy Carter in 1976.

United States presidential election results for Jefferson County, Idaho
Year	Republican		Democratic		Third party(ies)	
Year	No.	%	No.	%	No.	%
1916	993	36.44%	1,606	58.94%	126	4.62%
1920	1,794	70.77%	741	29.23%	0	0.00%
1924	1,393	50.07%	305	10.96%	1,084	38.96%
1928	1,671	55.18%	1,350	44.58%	7	0.23%
1932	1,177	31.54%	2,501	67.02%	54	1.45%
1936	1,037	26.84%	2,776	71.84%	51	1.32%
1940	1,717	39.34%	2,631	60.29%	16	0.37%
1944	1,458	39.78%	2,198	59.97%	9	0.25%
1948	1,490	41.76%	2,017	56.53%	61	1.71%
1952	2,970	66.80%	1,474	33.15%	2	0.04%
1956	2,748	60.12%	1,823	39.88%	0	0.00%
1960	2,625	52.51%	2,374	47.49%	0	0.00%
1964	2,740	57.07%	2,061	42.93%	0	0.00%
1968	2,927	61.48%	955	20.06%	879	18.46%
1972	2,983	58.38%	715	13.99%	1,412	27.63%
1976	3,599	65.14%	1,745	31.58%	181	3.28%
1980	5,860	84.52%	833	12.02%	240	3.46%
1984	5,770	87.92%	743	11.32%	50	0.76%
1988	5,295	79.64%	1,198	18.02%	156	2.35%
1992	3,471	48.78%	978	13.74%	2,667	37.48%
1996	4,925	66.53%	1,427	19.28%	1,051	14.20%
2000	6,480	82.70%	1,100	14.04%	256	3.27%
2004	7,703	86.49%	1,084	12.17%	119	1.34%
2008	8,540	81.79%	1,641	15.72%	260	2.49%
2012	9,895	86.94%	1,303	11.45%	183	1.61%
2016	8,436	73.52%	976	8.51%	2,063	17.98%
2020	12,099	85.32%	1,661	11.71%	420	2.96%
2024	13,481	84.69%	1,891	11.88%	546	3.43%

== Communities ==
=== Cities ===
- Lewisville
- Menan
- Mud Lake
- Rigby
- Ririe
- Roberts

=== Unincorporated communities ===
- Grant
- Hamer
- Heise
- Monteview
- Terreton
- LaBelle

== Education ==
School districts include:

- Jefferson County Joint School District 251
- Ririe Joint School District 252
- West Jefferson School District 253

The College of Eastern Idaho includes this county in its catchment zone; however, this county is not in its taxation zone.

== Notable people ==
- Earl W. Bascom, rodeo pioneer, inventor, actor, cowboy artist, inductee of the Idaho Rodeo Hall of Fame
- Philo Farnsworth, inventor and television pioneer
- Pat Friday, singer

== See also ==
- National Register of Historic Places listings in Jefferson County, Idaho
