= Interstate 84 in Idaho =

Highway in Idaho

Interstate 84
- Vietnam Veterans Memorial Highway
- I-84 highlighted in red

Route information
- Maintained by ITD
- Length: 275.650 mi (443.616 km)
- NHS: Entire route

Major junctions
- West end: I-84 at Oregon state line
- US 95 near Fruitland; US 20 / US 26 in Caldwell; I-184 in Boise; US 20 / US 26 in Boise; US 20 in Mountain Home; US 26 in Bliss; US 93 near Twin Falls; I-86 / US 30 near Declo
- East end: I-84 at Utah state line

Location
- Country: United States
- State: Idaho
- Counties: Payette, Canyon, Ada, Elmore, Gooding, Jerome, Minidoka, Cassia, Oneida

Highway system
- Interstate Highway System; Main; Auxiliary; Suffixed; Business; Future; Idaho State Highway System; Interstate; US; State
← SH-81	→ I-86

Interstate 84 (I-84) in the U.S. state of Idaho is a major Interstate Highway that traverses the state from the Oregon state line in the northwest to Utah state line in the southeast. It primarily follows the Snake River across a plain that includes the cities of Caldwell, Nampa, Boise, Mountain Home, and Twin Falls. The highway is one of the busiest in Idaho and is designated as the Vietnam Veterans Memorial Highway.

I-84 runs for 276 miles (444 km) within Idaho, beginning near Ontario, Oregon, and traveling concurrent with several U.S. routes through the Boise metropolitan area and Mountain Home towards Twin Falls. I-84 splits away from US 30 and the Snake River at a junction with I-86 near Declo, where it turns southeast to cross the Sublett Range into northern Utah. The highway has an auxiliary route, I-184, which serves downtown Boise.

== Route description ==
I-84 is the longest Interstate highway in Idaho, running for 276 miles (444 km) and connecting several of the state's largest metropolitan areas. It has a single auxiliary route, I-184 in Boise, and several business routes. The highway was officially designated as the Vietnam Veterans Memorial Highway in 2014, mirroring the name for Oregon's section of I-84. The Idaho section of I-84 is maintained by the Idaho Transportation Department (ITD), which conducts an annual survey of traffic on certain highway segments that is expressed in terms of annual average daily traffic (AADT), a measure of traffic volume for any average day of the year. Average daily traffic volumes on I-84 in 2018 ranged from a minimum of 9,552 vehicles near Sweetzer Summit and 139,113 vehicles at I-184 in western Boise.

=== Boise and Treasure Valley ===
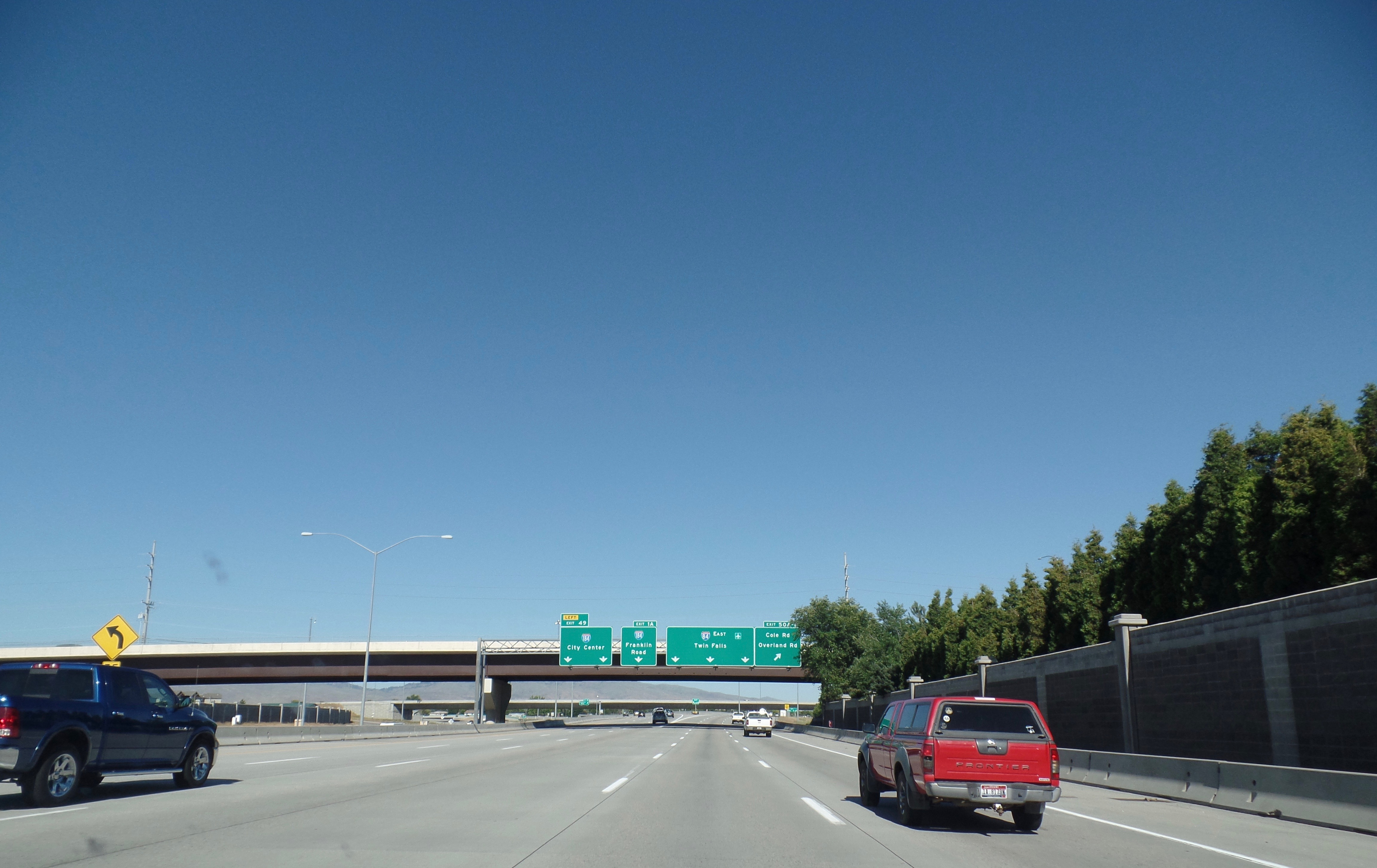
Looking eastbound on I-84 in Boise, approaching the terminus of I-184

I-84 enters the state of Idaho after crossing the Snake River from Ontario, Oregon, west of Fruitland, Idaho. The four-lane freeway travels southeast along the Snake River and passes an eastbound-only rest area and visitors center, which mirrors a westbound facility on the Oregon side of the river. Its first interchange is with US 95, the primary north–south highway in Idaho, at Palisades Corner south of Fruitland. I-84 continues southeast across farmland in the Snake River Plain and straddles the edge of a hill. South of New Plymouth the freeway intersects and becomes concurrent with US 30. The paired highways continue south along the side of a hill and cross into Canyon County northeast of Notus.

The freeway enters the Treasure Valley, which also constitutes much of the Boise metropolitan area, near the outskirts of Caldwell and intersects State Highway 44 (SH-44), which continues east to Middleton and Eagle. Shortly before crossing the Boise River into Downtown Caldwell, I-84 and US 30 begin a brief concurrency with US 20 and US 26, with both continue west towards Parma and the Oregon state border. The freeway skirts the north side of Downtown Caldwell, which is served by a designated business route, and passes through residential neighborhoods before US 20 and US 26 split off and travel east onto Franklin Road. I-84 and US 30 continue southeast through an industrial area and pass the Caldwell Industrial Airport and Karcher Mall before reaching the city of Nampa. The six-lane freeway travels through an industrial area on the northwestern side of Nampa, parallel to a set of railroad tracks, but turns east to bypass the city center. SH-55 joins the concurrency at an interchange with Karcher Road and I-84 Business returns to the freeway at an interchange located near Nampa Gateway Center, the Nampa campus of the College of Western Idaho, and the Ford Idaho Center.

I-84 expands to eight lanes as it leaves Nampa and enters Ada County, passing through suburban neighborhoods in Meridian. The freeway crosses under two single-point urban interchanges at Ten Mile Road and SH-69, along with a partial cloverleaf interchange where SH-55 splits from the concurrency to head north. I-84 enters the city of Boise and expands to ten lanes before an interchange with I-184, an auxiliary route that travels into Downtown Boise. I-84 turns southeast and travels around the city's outer residential neighborhoods, passing the main terminal at Boise Airport and a nearby industrial area. The freeway is rejoined by US 20 and US 26 before leaving Boise, climbing out of Treasure Valley by following Fivemile Creek over a barren plateau.

=== Mountain Home and Magic Valley ===
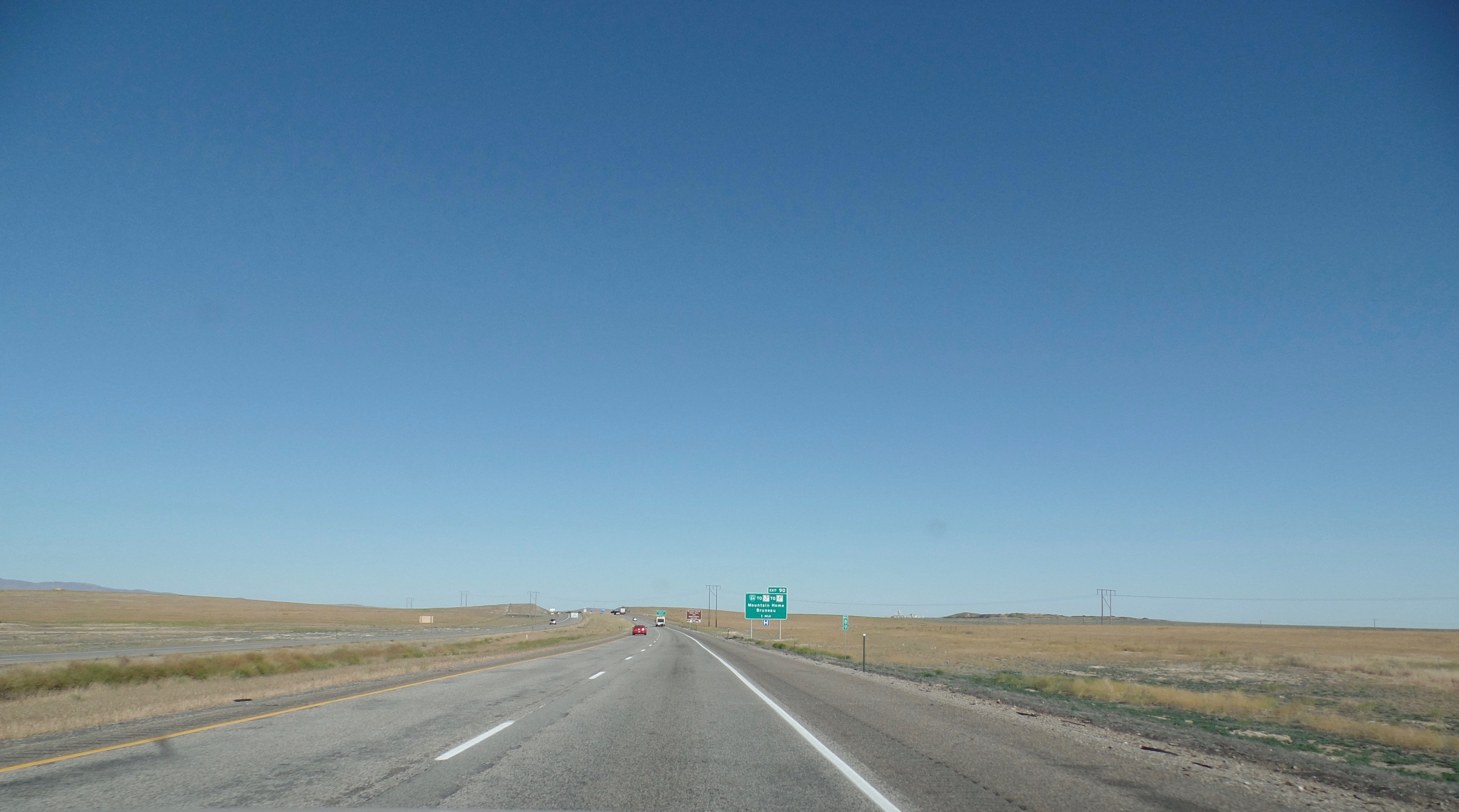
I-84 eastbound, approaching Mountain Home

The highway crosses into Elmore County and rejoins the Union Pacific Railroad's Nampa Subdivision as it passes the Morley Nelson Snake River Birds of Prey National Conservation Area. I-84 then travels around the city of Mountain Home, while a signed business route serves the city center and leads to the nearby Mountain Home Air Force Base. On the east side of the city, I-84 intersects SH-51 and ends its concurrency with US 20, which continues east towards Sun Valley, Idaho Falls, and Yellowstone National Park. I-84, US 26, and US 30 continue southeast through the conservation area and descends from the plateau into the Snake River Plain. The freeway travels around the north side of Hammett, which is served by a business route that connects to SH-78, and reaches the Snake River.

I-84 travels upstream along the north bank of the Snake River to Glenns Ferry, where it bypasses the town and Three Island Crossing State Park. The freeway crosses over the river twice east of Glenns Ferry to avoid a bend in the river, which is followed by the railroad. After entering Gooding County, I-84 reaches the town of Bliss, where US 30 and US 26 both split from the freeway and end their concurrency. US 30 travels south along the Snake River towards Hagerman, while US 26 runs east across the plains to Gooding and Craters of the Moon National Monument and Preserve. The freeway continues southeast and crosses 250 feet (76 m) over the Mallad Gorge (part of Thousand Springs State Park) on a pair of level bridges. I-84 then passes through farmland on the edge of a lava plain while following an abandoned railroad right of way to Wendell, where it intersects SH-46.

The freeway travels around the south side of Wendell and turns east to follow an active railroad through a rural area that marks the boundary of Jerome County. I-84 reaches the county seat, also named Jerome, and turns southeast after intersecting SH-25 to bypass the city. The interstate intersects SH-79 on the south side of Jerome and reaches a partial cloverleaf interchange with US 93 across the Snake River Canyon from the city of Twin Falls. I-84 then proceeds eastward through the rural Magic Valley, staying on the north side of the Snake River. It intersects SH-50 at Tipperary Corner and bends south around Skeleton Butte and a municipal airport in Hazelton. Between Hazelton and the Minidoka County line, I-84 is concurrent with SH-25, which continues along the north side of the valley.

=== Southeastern Idaho ===
I-84 passes north of Burley, intersecting SH-27 near Paul. At a partial cloverleaf interchange in northeastern Heyburn, the freeway intersects SH-24 and is rejoined by US 30, beginning a new concurrency as the highway leaves the Magic Valley. I-84 crosses over the Snake River into Cassia County and intersects SH-25 and SH-25 at an interchange on the east bank of the river near Declo. Near the Minidoka National Wildlife Refuge, I-84 reaches the western terminus of I-86, which carries US 30 and follows the Snake River upstream to American Falls and Pocatello. I-84 turns southeast from the interchange and continues into the Raft River Valley, running parallel to SH-81 near Horse Butte in view of the Cotterel Mountains.

After crossing the rural valley, I-84 begins following Meadow Creek and climbs into Mortenson Canyon, which marks the northeastern extent of the Black Pine Mountains. The highway crests at Sweetzer Summit, located 5,522 feet (1,683 m) above sea level, and descends into the Juniper Valley on the south side of the Sublett Range in Sawtooth National Forest. I-84 continues southeast across the valley, passing a set of rest areas in Oneida County, and reaches the Utah state border northwest of Snowville. The freeway continues into Utah and passes through Ogden before terminating at a junction with I-80 in the Wasatch Range.

== History ==
Prior to the construction of I-84, the corridor was served by Idaho State Highway 2 and Route A of the Sampson Trails system. U.S. Route 30 was created in 1926 under the national numbered highway system, traveling through southern Idaho along the historic Oregon Trail. Near Declo, US 30 split into two routes: U.S. Route 30N, following the Snake River to Pocatello, and U.S. Route 30S, providing a shorter connection to the Salt Lake City area.

The Interstate highway was initially designated in 1957 as Interstate 82, but was renumbered as Interstate 80N in 1958 to correspond with US 30.

The route of I-80N between Nampa and Boise was selected in 1958 as one of eight proposals and completed in stages between 1965 and 1968. Rural sections in southwestern Idaho had already been completed by the mid-1960s, connecting Ontario, Oregon, to Caldwell, and Boise to Mountain Home. The 6.6-mile (10.6 km) Nampa–Meridian section opened to traffic on September 29, 1965. Another 4.5 miles (7.2 km) from SH-69 in Meridian to western Boise opened on December 12, 1968, at a cost of $9.5 million. The freeway was extended west from Nampa to Caldwell on December 21, 1966, filling a gap in Interstate 80N and connecting to an already-completed rural section. The 11.1-mile (17.9 km) bypass around southeastern Boise was opened on December 1, 1969. It cost $7.13 million to construct and included five interchanges. Another section was opened around the same time in Sublett in eastern Cassia County, which caused the killing of eighteen mule deer from a local herd from collisions with drivers within the first six weeks.

=== Renumbering and reconstruction ===
On May 1, 1980, I-80N was renumbered to I-84 to eliminate confusion with the western section of the non-suffixed I-80, which split from I-80N in Salt Lake City and continued west to San Francisco. The change was approved by AASHTO in July 1977 and resulted in the replacement of 1,000 signs along the freeway in Idaho.

Several rest areas on I-84 were closed in 1992 due to budget cuts and maintenance issues and their restoration was dependent on several federal highway bills that were never passed.

To address increasing traffic congestion in the Boise metropolitan area, fueled by population growth and suburban development, the Idaho Transportation Department (ITD) has widened 24 miles (39 km) of I-84 with funds from a bond sale approved by the state legislature in 2005. A six-mile (10 km) section between eastern Nampa and Meridian was widened to six lanes in October 2009 and eight lanes in August 2011 as part of a $113 million expansion project. The agency has also built several single-point urban interchanges (SPUIs) in Meridian and Boise to improve efficiency.

Construction of a widened eight-lane section of I-84 through Nampa began in July 2019 and was completed two years later at a cost of $150 million. The project included several new overpasses and rebuilt interchanges—including one SPUI—from Franklin Boulevard to Karcher Road (SH-55). A second phase to expand the freeway to six lanes for four miles (6.4 km) through Caldwell began construction in 2021 and was completed in August 2023 at a cost of $300 million. The third phase, extending north to Centennial Way, is planned to begin construction in 2023; the final phase to the SH-44 interchange near Middleton is under design and study as of 2021.

In 2017, the ITD also began work to resurface and restore fifteen bridges on I-84 that had deteriorated over their lifespan. The project also included pavement repair and improvements on 21 miles (34 km) of the highway in the Magic Valley region.

In 2014 and 2019, because of increased speeds and the installation of new interchanges at Declo and Twin Falls, the ITD closed the Jerome rest area and extended the Cotterell rest area to make way for a new weigh station. To remedy this Idaho joined the Interstate Oasis Program and opened three truck stops in Twin Falls and Jerome.

== Exit list ==
County	Location	mi	km	Exit	Destinations	Notes
Payette		0.000	0.000		I-84 west – Portland	Continuation into Oregon
Payette		2.876	4.628	3	US 95 – Parma, Fruitland, Payette	
Payette		9.498	15.286	9	US 30 west – Emmett, New Plymouth	West end of US-30 overlap
Payette		12.906	20.770	13	Black Canyon Junction	
Canyon		17.335	27.898	17	Sand Hollow	
Canyon		24.839	39.974	25	SH-44 – Middleton	
Canyon		25.994	41.833	26	US 20 west / US 26 west – Parma, Notus	West end of US-20/US-26 overlap
Canyon	Caldwell	26.723	43.006	27	I-84 BL east to SH-19 – Caldwell, Wilder, Homedale	
Canyon	Caldwell	27.620	44.450	28	10th Avenue – Caldwell City Center	
Canyon	Caldwell	28.650	46.108	29	US 20 east / US 26 east (Franklin Road)	East end of US-20/US-26 overlap
Canyon	Nampa	33.539	53.976	33	SH-55 south / Midland Boulevard – Nampa, Marsing	West end of SH-55 overlap
Canyon	Nampa	34.965	56.271	35	Northside Boulevard	
Canyon	Nampa	35.985	57.912	36	Franklin Boulevard	
Canyon	Nampa	37.945	61.067	38	I-84 BL west (Garrity Boulevard) – Nampa, Murphy	
Canyon	Nampa	39.645	63.802	40	SH-16 north – Emmett / Franklin Road	New interchange under construction
Ada		42.000	67.592	42	Ten Mile Road	
Ada	Meridian	44.007	70.822	44	SH-69 – Meridian, Kuna	
Ada	Meridian	45.998	74.027	46	SH-55 north – McCall, Eagle	East end of SH-55 overlap
Ada	Boise	49.307	79.352	49	I-184 east / Franklin Road – City Center	Left exit eastbound; I-184 exit 0
Ada	Boise	50.140	80.693	50	Cole Road / Overland Road	Signed as exits 50A (Overland Rd. west) and 50B (Cole/Overland) eastbound, and 50A (Cole/Overland) and 50B (Overland Rd. east) westbound
Ada	Boise	51.997	83.681	52	Orchard Street	
Ada	Boise	53.483	86.073	53	Vista Avenue – Boise Airport	
Ada	Boise	54.485	87.685	54	US 20 / US 26 west (Broadway Avenue)	West end of US-20/US-26 overlap
Ada	Boise	56.932	91.623	57	SH-21 (Gowen Road) – Idaho City	
Ada		59.510	95.772	59	S. Eisenman Road / Memory Road	Signed as exits 59A (S. Eisenman Rd.) and 59B (Memory Rd.) eastbound
Ada		63.517	102.221	64	Blacks Creek Road – Kuna	
Ada		70.772	113.896	71	Mayfield, Orchard	
Elmore		74.333	119.627	74	Simco Road	
Elmore		90.280	145.292	90	I-84 BL east to SH-51 / SH-67 – Mountain Home, Bruneau	Eastbound signage
Elmore		90.280	145.292	90	West Mountain Home	Westbound signage
Elmore		95.193	153.198	95	US 20 east (Sun Valley Highway) / I-84 BL west / SH-51 south (American Legion Boulevard) to SH-67 – Mountain Home, Fairfield	East end of US-20 overlap
Elmore		99.570	160.242	99	Old Oregon Trail Road – Mountain Home	
Elmore		111.800	179.925	112	I-84 BL east to SH-78 – Hammett	
Elmore		113.856	183.233	114	I-84 BL west to SH-78 / Cold Springs Road – Hammett	Westbound exit and eastbound entrance
Elmore		120.149	193.361	120	I-84 BL east – Glenns Ferry	Eastbound exit and westbound entrance
Elmore		121.094	194.882	121	I-84 BL west – King Hill, Glenns Ferry	
Elmore		125.159	201.424	125	Paradise Valley	
Elmore		128.993	207.594	129	King Hill	
Gooding		137.060	220.577	137	I-84 BL east / US 30 east / Pioneer Road – Buhl, Bliss	East end of US-30 overlap
Gooding		140.405	225.960	141	I-84 BL west / US 26 east to US 30 – Gooding, Hagerman, Bliss	East end of US-26 overlap
Gooding		146.870	236.364	147	Tuttle	
Gooding		155.260	249.867	155	To SH-46 – Wendell, Hagerman	
Gooding		156.581	251.993	157	SH-46 – Gooding, Wendell	
Jerome		165.160	265.799	165	SH-25 – Jerome	
Jerome	Jerome	168.010	270.386	168	SH-79	
Jerome		173.013	278.437	173	US 93 – Twin Falls, Sun Valley	Main exit into Twin Falls via the Perrine Bridge
Jerome		181.930	292.788	182	SH-50 – Kimberly, Eden, Twin Falls	
Jerome		188.301	303.041	188	Valley Road – Hazelton, Eden	
Jerome		193.525	311.448	194	SH-25 west (Ridgeway Road) – Hazelton	West end of SH-25 overlap
Jerome–Minidoka county line		200.536	322.731	201	SH-25 east / Kasota Road – Paul	East end of SH-25 overlap
Minidoka		208.015	334.768	208	I-84 BL east / SH-27 – Paul, Burley	
Minidoka	Heyburn	210.591	338.913	211	I-84 BL west / US 30 west / SH-24 – Burley, Rupert	West end of US-30 overlap
Cassia		216.395	348.254	216	SH-25 / SH-77 – Albion, Rupert, Declo	
Cassia		221.880	357.081	222	I-86 east / US 30 east to I-15 – Pocatello	Left exit eastbound; East end of US-30 overlap
Cassia		227.950	366.850	228	To SH-81 / Yale Road – Malta, Declo	
Cassia		236.655	380.859	237	Idahome Road	
Cassia		244.810	393.984	245	Sublett Road – Malta	
Cassia		253.705	408.299	254	Sweetzer Road	
Oneida		262.512	422.472	263	Juniper Road	
Oneida		275.650	443.616		I-84 east – Ogden, Salt Lake City	Continuation into Utah
1.000 mi = 1.609 km; 1.000 km = 0.621 mi: Concurrency terminus; Incomplete access

Interstate 84
Previous state: Oregon	Idaho	Next state: Utah
