= U.S. Route 30 in Idaho =

US Highway section within the state of Idaho

U.S. Highway 30
- US 30 highlighted in red

Route information
- Maintained by ITD
- Length: 455.481 mi (733.026 km)
- Existed: 1926–present
- Tourist routes: Thousand Springs Scenic Byway

Major junctions
- West end: US 30 in Fruitland
- US 95 in Fruitland; I-84 near New Plymouth; US 20 / US 26 near Caldwell; I-184 in Boise; US 93 near Filer; I-84 / SH-24 in Heyburn; I-86 near Declo; I-15 BL / US 91 in Pocatello; I-15 in Pocatello; US 89 in Montpelier
- East end: US 30 near Dingle

Location
- Country: United States
- State: Idaho
- Counties: Payette, Canyon, Ada, Elmore, Gooding, Twin Falls, Cassia, Minidoka, Power, Bannock, Caribou, Bear Lake

Highway system
- United States Numbered Highway System; List; Special; Divided; Idaho State Highway System; Interstate; US; State
← SH-29	→ SH-31

U.S. Highway 30 (US 30) runs northwest–southeast across the southern half of lower Idaho for 455.481 miles (733.026 km). US 30 enters the state from Oregon across the Snake River in Fruitland and exits into Wyoming east of Dingle. US 30 runs through the large population centers of Boise, Twin Falls, and Pocatello, as well as a plethora of smaller communities from Fruitland to Montpelier. The Thousand Springs Scenic Byway is a picturesque section of US 30 in southern Idaho between the towns of Bliss and Buhl, dipping down into the Hagerman Valley and a canyon of the Snake River.

The highway has four extensive concurrencies with Interstate Highways: Interstate 84 (I-84) twice, I-86, and I-15. Outside of its Interstate concurrencies, the route is largely two lanes and rural outside of portions through major towns and cities.

== Route description ==
=== Oregon state line to Boise ===
After crossing the Snake River, US 30 enters Fruitland as Northwest 16th Street before intersecting US 95. The route then turns south along US 95 (Whitley Drive in Fruitland). Just north of the I-84 interchange, US 30 turns east toward New Plymouth. In New Plymouth, US 30 bends south, then southeast, and then south again. Just northeast of the Langley Gulch Power Plant, US 30 begins to travel southeast at a diamond interchange, running concurrently with I-84. Along the way, they serve Sand Hollow with one diamond interchange. Just north of Caldwell, US 20 and US 26 enter the freeway southeastward, joining with the concurrency. Entering Caldwell, they then serve I-84 Business/State Highway 19 (I-84 Bus./SH-19) and 10th Avenue before both US 20 and US 26 leave the freeway together on Franklin Road. In Nampa, I-84 and US 30 then serve SH-55, which then travels eastward concurrently with the two routes. The three routes then serve Northside Boulevard, Franklin Boulevard, and Garrity Boulevard (I-84 Bus.). In Meridian, the freeway concurrency serves SH-69. At the next exit, SH-55 leaves the concurrency. Then, in Boise, the freeway comes across I-184 which serves Downtown Boise. Between exits 52 and 54, the freeway is situated north adjacent to Boise Airport, with exit 53 serving the main terminal. Also, at exit 54, US 20 and US 26 rejoin the freeway.

=== Boise to Downtown Pocatello ===
After leaving Boise, the freeway then serves multiple roads (including SH-21) before reaching Mountain Home. In Mountain Home, the freeway serves I-84 Bus. At the next exit, US 20 leaves the freeway alone. The three remaining routes go on to serve several more roads (such as I-84 Bus. and SH-78). Then, in Bliss, US 30 leaves the freeway and enters the Thousand Springs Scenic Byway. As US 30 approaches I-84, the route turns south and east, serving Hagerman, Buhl, Filer, and Twin Falls. North of Kimberly, the route then leaves the byway. In Burley, the route then intersects SH-27 and SH-81. In Heyburn, the route rejoins I-84 while also intersecting SH-24. They then serve SH-25/SH-77 at the same interchange. Then, US 30 transitions from I-84 to I-86 on a modified interchange. Both I-86 and US 30 serve more roads and places (including Register Rock, I-86 Bus., SH-39, and Pocatello Regional Airport). At exit 58, US 30 leaves the freeway as it approaches Pocatello. At this point, US 30 travels along a road parallel to the railroad. Along the way near downtown, it then begins to run concurrently with I-15 Bus. and US 91. Shortly after that, the concurrently splits into a one-way pair.

==== Thousand Springs Scenic Byway ====
The Thousand Springs Scenic Byway is a picturesque section of US 30 in southern Idaho between the towns of Bliss and Buhl, dipping down into the Hagerman Valley and a canyon of the Snake River. The byway takes its name from the numerous streams and rivulets springing forth out of the east wall of that canyon, many of them plainly visible from the road, with the panoramic river in the foreground. These springs are outlets from the Snake River Aquifer, which flows through thousands of square miles of porous volcanic rock and is one of the largest groundwater systems in the world. The aquifer is believed to be fed by the Big Lost River which disappears into lava flows near Arco, about 90 miles (140 km) northeast of Hagerman.

=== Downtown Pocatello to Wyoming state line ===
The concurrency returns to a two-way street. It then comes across I-15 at a diamond interchange. At this point, both U.S. Highways continue southeast along I-15 while I-15 Bus. ends there. The three routes (I-15, US 30, and US 91) then serve even more places such as another I-15 Bus. in Inkom. At exit 47, US 30 leaves the freeway to serve McCammon. At this point, US 30 begins to meander across several mountains. Between Alexander and Soda Springs, SH-34 runs concurrently with US 30. US 30 then serves more towns through the rest of the state, especially Montpelier. In Montpelier, US 89 briefly runs concurrently with US 30.

== History ==
US 30 was established in 1926 during the creation of the United States Numbered Highway System, largely along the transcontinental Lincoln Highway, an existing auto trail. The corridor was also preceded by the Old Oregon Trail Highway between Oregon and Utah. The highway crossed southern Idaho by following Route 2 between the Oregon state line and Burley, where it split into two suffixed routes: US 30N through Pocatello and to Montpelier; and US 30S toward Ogden, Utah.

Construction of I-80N (now I-84), a freeway that would parallel US 30 between Portland, Oregon, and northern Utah, began in the 1960s under the Federal-Aid Highway Act of 1956. Various sections of US 30 were relocated onto the new freeway as sections opened over the following two decades. The two suffixed routes were eliminated in 1972 in favor of US 30 remaining on the northern route while generally following I-80N and I-15W (now I-86). A section through Meridian and Downtown Boise was removed in 1980, replaced by a longer overlap with I-84. Five years later, the section from Caldwell to Nampa was replaced with I-84 Bus.

== Major intersections ==
County	Location	mi	km	Exit	Destinations	Notes
Payette	Fruitland	0.000	0.000		US 30 west – Ontario	Continuation west into Oregon
Payette	Fruitland	0.610	0.982		US 95 north (North Whitley Drive) / NW 16th Street – Payette, Weiser	Western end of US 95 concurrency
Payette		21.530	34.649		US 95 south to I-84 – Parma, Winnemucca	Eastern end of US 95 concurrency; destinations signed eastbound only
Payette		27.940	44.965		SH-72 east – Emmett	Western end of SH-72
Payette		31.073– 31.175	50.007– 50.171	9	I-84 west – Ontario	Western end of I-84 concurrency
Payette		12.906	20.770	13	Black Canyon Junction	
Canyon		17.335	27.898	17	Sand Hollow	
Canyon		24.839	39.974	25	SH-44 – Middleton	
Canyon		25.994	41.833	26	US 20 west / US 26 west – Parma, Notus	Western end of US 20/US 26 concurrency
Canyon	Caldwell	26.723	43.006	27	I-84 BL east to SH-19 – Caldwell, Wilder, Homedale	
Canyon	Caldwell	27.620	44.450	28	10th Avenue – Caldwell City Center	
Canyon	Caldwell	28.650	46.108	29	US 20 east / US 26 east (Franklin Road)	Eastern end of US 20/US 26 concurrency
Canyon	Nampa	33.539	53.976	33	SH-55 south / Midland Boulevard – Nampa, Marsing	Western end of SH-55 concurrency; signed as exits 33A (SH-55) and 33B (Midland Blvd.) westbound
Canyon	Nampa	34.965	56.271	35	Northside Boulevard	
Canyon	Nampa	35.985	57.912	36	Franklin Boulevard	
Canyon	Nampa	37.945	61.067	38	I-84 BL west (Garrity Boulevard) – Nampa, Murphy	
Ada	Meridian	42.000	67.592	42	Ten Mile Road	
Ada	Meridian	44.007	70.822	44	SH-69 – Meridian, Kuna	
Ada	Meridian	45.998	74.027	46	SH-55 north – McCall, Eagle	Eastern end of SH-55 concurrency
Ada	Boise	49.307	79.352	49	I-184 east / Franklin Road – City Center	I-184 exit 0
Ada	Boise	50.140	80.693	50	Cole Road / Overland Road	Signed as exits 50A (Overland Rd. west) and 50B (Cole/Overland) eastbound, and 50A (Cole/Overland) and 50B (Overland Rd. east) westbound
Ada	Boise	51.997	83.681	52	Orchard Street	
Ada	Boise	53.483	86.073	53	Vista Avenue – Boise Airport	
Ada	Boise	54.485	87.685	54	US 20 / US 26 west (Broadway Avenue)	Western end of US 20/US 26 concurrency
Ada	Boise	56.932	91.623	57	SH-21 (Gowen Road) – Idaho City	
Ada		59.510	95.772	59	S. Eisenman Road / Memory Road	Signed as exits 59A (S. Eisenman Rd.) and 59B (Memory Rd.) eastbound
Ada		63.517	102.221	64	Blacks Creek Road – Kuna	
Ada	Regina	70.772	113.896	71	Mayfield, Orchard	
Elmore		74.333	119.627	74	Simco Road	
Elmore		90.280	145.292	90	I-84 BL east to SH-51 / SH-67 – Mountain Home, Bruneau	Eastbound signage
Elmore		90.280	145.292	90	West Mountain Home	Westbound signage
Elmore	Mountain Home	95.193	153.198	95	US 20 east (Sun Valley Highway) / I-84 BL west / SH-51 south (American Legion Boulevard) to SH-67 – Mountain Home, Fairfield	Eastern end of US 20 concurrency
Elmore		99.570	160.242	99	Old Oregon Trail Road – Mountain Home	
Elmore		111.800	179.925	112	I-84 BL east to SH-78 – Hammett	
Elmore		113.856	183.233	114	I-84 BL west to SH-78 / Cold Springs Road – Hammett	Westbound exit and eastbound entrance
Elmore		120.149	193.361	120	I-84 BL east – Glenns Ferry	Eastbound exit and westbound entrance
Elmore		121.094	194.882	121	I-84 BL west – King Hill, Glenns Ferry	
Elmore		125.159	201.424	125	Paradise Valley	
Elmore		128.993	207.594	129	King Hill	
Gooding	Bliss	172.595	277.765	137	I-84 east / US 26 east / Old U.S. 30 – Twin Falls	Eastern end of I-84/US 26 concurrency;western end of US 95 concurrency western end of I-84 Bus. overlap; western terminus of I-84 Bus.
Gooding	Bliss	172.663	277.874		To I-84 / US 26 (I-84 Bus. east) / South 750 East – Twin Falls, Gooding	Eastern end of I-84 Bus. concurrency; Twin Falls signed eastbound, Gooding westbound
Twin Falls	Buhl				North 1500 East Road (SH-46 north)	Southern end of SH-46
Twin Falls		211.645– 212.612	340.610– 342.166		US 93 – Sun Valley, Jackpot, Wells	Western end of US 93 Bus. concurrency; western end of US 93 Bus.; interchange; Sun Valley and Jackpot signed eastbound, Wells westbound
Twin Falls	Twin Falls	217.199– 217.282	349.548– 349.681		US 93 Bus. north (Addison Avenue) to I-84 – Jerome, Sun Valley	Eastern end of US 93 Bus. concurrency; to I-84, destinations signed westbound only
Twin Falls	Twin Falls	217.915	350.700		SH-74 south (Shoshone Street South) / Shoshone Street East – Wells	Northern end of SH-74
Twin Falls		223.505	359.696		SH-50 east to I-84 / North 3500 East – Burley, Pocatello	Western end of SH-50
Cassia	Burley	257.481	414.376		I-84 BL west / SH-27 (Overland Avenue) – Oakley, Paul	Western end of I-84 Bus. concurrency
Cassia	Burley	258.628– 258.723	416.221– 416.374		SH-81 east / Airport Way – Declo	Western end of SH-81
Minidoka	Heyburn	261.123– 261.754	420.237– 421.252	211	I-84 west / SH-24 west – Twin Falls, Rupert	Eastern end of I-84 Bus. concurrency; western end of I-84 concurrency;Rupert signed eastbound only; eastern end of I-84 Bus.; western end of SH-84
Cassia		216.395	348.254	216	SH-25 / SH-77 – Albion, Rupert, Declo	
Minidoka		272.947– 0.000	439.266– 0.000	222 1	I-84 east / I-86 begins – Ogden, Salt Lake	Eastern end of I-84 concurrency; Western end of I-86 concurrency
Cassia		14.807	23.830	15	Raft River Area	
Power		20.590	33.136	21	Coldwater Area	
Power		28.100	45.223	28	Massacre Rocks State Park	
Power		32.620	52.497	33	Neeley Area	
Power	American Falls	36.123	58.134	36	SH-37 south / I-86 BL east – Rockland, American Falls	
Power	American Falls	40.110	64.551	40	SH-39 north / I-86 BL west – Aberdeen, American Falls	
Power		44.327	71.337	44	Seagull Bay	
Power		49.152	79.102	49	Rainbow Road	
Power		52.491	84.476	52	Arbon Valley	
Power		55.551	89.401	56	Pocatello Regional Airport	
Power		330.820– 330.930	532.403– 532.580	58	I-86 east / Tank Farm Road – Idaho Falls	Eastern end of I-86 concurrency; I-86 exit 58
Bannock	Pocatello	335.778	540.382		I-15 BL north / US 91 north (Yellowstone Avenue) to I-15 / East Oak Street – Blackfoot, Idaho Falls	Western end of I-15 Bus./US 91 concurrency; to I-15 signed westbound only
Bannock	Pocatello	339.220	545.922	67	I-15 north / South Fifth Avenue – Idaho Falls	Eastern end of I-15 Bus. concurrency; western end of I-15 concurrency; southern end of I-15 Bus.; I-15 exit 67
Bannock	Portneuf	63.037	101.448	63	Portneuf Road – Portneuf Area	
Bannock	Inkom	57.694	92.849	58	I-15 BL south – Inkom	Southbound exit, northbound entrance
Bannock	Inkom	56.646	91.163	57	I-15 BL north – Inkom	Northbound exit, southbound entrance
Bannock		359.493	578.548	47	I-15 south / US 91 south / East Merrill Road – Arimo, Salt Lake	Eastern end of I-15/US 91 concurrency
Caribou		386.450	621.931		SH-34 south / Old US 30 – Grace, Bancroft	Western end of SH-34 concurrency; Bancroft signed westbound only
Caribou	Soda Springs	405.543	652.658		SH-34 north (South Third Street) / South Third Street – Wayan, Jackson	Eastern end of SH-34 concurrency
Bear Lake	Montpelier	434.712	699.601		US 89 north (Clay Street) / Clay Street	Western end of US 89 concurrency; destinations signed westbound only
Bear Lake	Montpelier	435.015	700.089		US 89 south (Washington Street) / Washington Street – Paris, Bear Lake, Logan, Salt Lake	Eastern end of US 89 concurrency; only Paris signed westbound
Bear Lake		455.481	733.026		US 30 east – Kemmerer	Continuation into Wyoming
1.000 mi = 1.609 km; 1.000 km = 0.621 mi: Concurrency terminus

U.S. Route 30
Previous state: Oregon	Idaho	Next state: Wyoming
