= U.S. Route 26 in Idaho =

U.S. Highway section within the state of Idaho

U.S. Highway 26
- US-26 highlighted in red

Route information
- Maintained by ITD
- Length: 402.5 mi (647.8 km)
- Existed: 1951–present

Major junctions
- West end: US 20 / US 26 near Nyssa, OR
- US 95 near Nyssa, OR; I-84 / US 30 near Caldwell; I-184 in Boise; I-84 / US 30 in Boise; US 93 in Shoshone; US 20 in Carey; I-15 / I-15 BL in Blackfoot; US 91 in Idaho Falls
- East end: US 26 near Alpine, WY

Location
- Country: United States
- State: Idaho
- Counties: Canyon, Ada, Elmore, Gooding, Lincoln, Blaine, Butte, Bingham, Bonneville

Highway system
- United States Numbered Highway System; List; Special; Divided; Idaho State Highway System; Interstate; US; State
← SH-25	→ SH-27

U.S. Highway 26 (US-26) runs east–west across south central Idaho for 402.5 miles (647.8 km). US-26 enters the state from Oregon across the Snake River east of Nyssa, Oregon, concurrent with US-20 and exits into Wyoming northwest of Alpine. US-26 runs through the large population centers of Boise and Idaho Falls, as well as the smaller communities of Parma, Notus, Garden City, Shoshone, Richfield, Carey, Arco, Blackfoot, Swan Valley, and Irwin.

For a vast majority of its route, US-26 is two lanes and rural, with the exception of portions in and around major towns and cities. It does have significant four-lane segments within the Boise metropolitan area and east of Idaho Falls. Despite its extensive length, US-26 has many hundreds of miles that run concurrently with other highways. In fact, its first 138.97 miles (223.65 km) in the state consists of concurrencies with any one of five different highways, principally US-20 and Interstate 84 (I-84). It has additional lengthy concurrencies with US-93, US-20 again, and I-15.

US-26 does have one business route in the state of Idaho, which runs through the small community of Ririe northeast of Idaho Falls.

== Route description ==
=== Oregon state line to Downtown Boise ===
After crossing the Snake River at the Oregon state line, US-26 and US-20 make a curve toward US-95. At that point, both routes travel south along US-95. The three routes then travel south and then curve southeast in Parma. Then, US-95 branches southward while the rest continues southeast. Both US-26 and US-20 pass through Notus before meeting I-84/US-30. At this point, the four routes meet I-84 Business (I-84 Bus.) and then 10th Avenue before US-20 and US-26 travel east on Franklin Road; all of the exits are in Caldwell.

As the two routes approach Boise, they intersect three state highways: State Highway 16 (SH-16), SH-55 on the Eagle–Boise city line, and SH-44 in Garden City. In Boise, as US-26 and US-20 merge eastward onto I-184, the Interstate designation ends there, but the freeway ends in about 0.75 miles (1.21 km). Just after the freeway crosses the Boise River, both routes traveling eastbound serve River Street and Bogus Basin. After this, the freeway approaches a 45 mph (72 km/h) curve and then becomes an at-grade one-way pair.

=== Downtown Boise to Blackfoot ===
As both routes exit downtown, they turn south and become a two-way street. Also, the two routes cross the Boise River for the second time. After that, they run along the eastern edge of Boise State University. As they approach Boise Airport, they then turn east onto I-84/US-30 again. This time, US-26 runs concurrently with I-84 for about 87 miles (140 km). Along the way, the freeway serves several state highways, I-84 business loops, and local roads in different locations. At one point east of Mountain Home, US-20 leaves the freeway and travels northeastward. As the freeway reaches Bliss, US-30, along with I-84 Bus., leaves the freeway as Thousand Springs Scenic Byway. At the next exit, US-26 leaves the freeway.

US-26 went on to serve a handful of state highways in Gooding and Shoshone. Also in Shoshone, the route begins to run concurrently with US-93. Both routes then serve Richfield. In Carey, they begin to run concurrently with US-20. For US-26, this is the second time in Idaho. The three routes serve Craters of the Moon National Monument and Preserve and Blizzard Mountain Ski Area. In Arco, US-93 branches northwestward. The rest continues eastward through Butte City and serves SH-33. Just southeast of the base of Idaho National Laboratory, US-26 branches southeast toward Blackfoot while US-20 continues east. As US-26 approaches Blackfoot, the route intersects SH-39 and then crosses over the same Snake River. Shortly after that, it turns northeast onto I-15 while the road continues as I-15 Bus.

=== Blackfoot to Wyoming state line ===
At this point, US-26 begins to run concurrently with I-15 for the next 23 miles (37 km). All the interchanges within this concurrency lead to local roads. As the freeway enters Idaho Falls, US-26 leaves the freeway and turns east along I-15 Bus. Both routes then cross the Snake River (the third time for US-26) and then intersect the northern terminus of US-91. At this point, both travel north toward downtown Idaho Falls. In downtown, I-15 Bus. branches westward toward I-15/US-20. Continuing northeast, US-26 intersects several more routes: SH-43 in Beachs Corner, US-26 Bus. (twice) near Ririe, and SH-31 in Swan Valley. Continuing eastward, US-26 travels along the bank of Snake River and then enters Wyoming.

== History ==
When US-26 was initially designated in the state in 1951, it ran only as far west as Idaho Falls. The next year, it was extended into Oregon.

In the Idaho Falls area, US-26 runs along local streets and county roads. In 2022, the Idaho Transportation Board approved a study into relocating parts of the highway onto US-20 following the reconstruction of the I-15/US-20 interchange at the west end of the Rigby Freeway.

== Major intersections ==
County	Location	mi	km	Exit	Destinations	Notes
Snake River		0.000	0.000		US 20 west (East Main Street) / US 26 west – Nyssa	Continuation into Oregon
Snake River		0.000	0.000		Snake River Bridge; Oregon–Idaho state line	
Payette–Canyon county line		1.578	2.540		US 95 north / Anderson Corner Road – Fruitland, Payette	Western end of US 95 overlap
Canyon		9.647	15.525		US 95 south – Wilder, Winnemucca	Eastern end of US 95 overlap
Canyon		21.995– 22.129	35.398– 35.613	26	I-84 west / US 30 west / Old Highway 30 – Ontario	Western end of I-84/US 30 overlap; I-84 exit 26
Canyon	Caldwell	22.858	36.786	27	I-84 BL east to SH-19 – Caldwell, Wilder, Homedale	
Canyon	Caldwell	23.755	38.230	28	10th Avenue – Caldwell City Center	
Canyon	Caldwell	24.840– 24.994	39.976– 40.224	29	I-84 east / US 30 east / Franklin Road – Caldwell, Boise	Eastern end of I-84/US 30 overlap; I-84 exit 29
Ada		34.267	55.147		SH-16 north (Central Valley Expressway) / North McDermott Road – Emmett	Southern terminus of SH-16
Ada	Boise–Eagle line	40.229	64.742		SH-55 (North Eagle Road) – Meridian, Eagle, McCall	
Ada	Garden City	44.166	71.078		SH-44 west (North Glenwood Street) to SH-55 / North Glenwood Street – Eagle, McCall	Eastern terminus of SH-44; to SH-55 signed westbound only
Ada	Boise	47.290– 47.31	76.106– 76.14		I-184 west to I-84	Westbound exit and eastbound entrance; interchange; eastern terminus of I-184
Ada	Boise	48.050	77.329		River Street — Bogus Basin	Eastbound exit only; interchange
Ada	Boise	52.135– 52.412	83.903– 84.349		Federal Way	Interchange
Ada	Boise	52.670– 52.824	84.764– 85.012	54	I-84 west / US 30 west / Commerce Avenue – Nampa	Western end of I-84/ US30 overlap; I-84 exit 54
See I-84 (see mile 54.485–140.405)
Gooding		138.970	223.651	141	I-84 east to US 30 – Twin Falls, Bliss, Hagerman	Eastern end of I-84 overlap; Hagerman signed eastbound, Bliss westbound
Gooding	Gooding	150.110	241.579		SH-46 (Main Street) – Wendell, Fairfield	Hospital signed eastbound only
Lincoln	Shoshone	165.928	267.035		US 93 south (South Greenwood Street) / South Rail Street East – Twin Falls	Western end of US 93 overlap
Lincoln	Shoshone	165.968	267.100		SH-75 north (North Greenwood Street) / North Rail Street West – Sun Valley	Southern terminus of SH-75
Blaine	Carey	204.281	328.758		US 20 west (Queen Crown Road) / Cenarrusa Lane – Picabo, Sun Valley, Boise	Western end of US 20 overlap; Picabo signed northbound, Sun Valley and Boise southbound
Butte	Arco	248.573	400.039		US 93 north (North Front Street) / East Grand Avenue – Mackay, Salmon	Eastern end of US 93 overlap; Salmon signed westbound only
Butte		256.073	412.110		SH-33 east – Howe	Western terminus of SH-33
Butte		272.0	437.7		US 20 east / East Portland Avenue – Idaho Falls, Idaho National Laboratory	Eastern end of US 20 overlap; laboratory signed westbound only
Bingham		305.743	492.046		SH-39 south – Aberdeen	Northern terminus of SH-39
Bingham	Blackfoot	305.804– 305.893	492.144– 492.287	Snake River		
Bingham	Blackfoot	305.930– 306.104	492.347– 492.627	93	I-15 south / I-15 BL south – Pocatello, Blackfoot	Western end of I-15 overlap; northern terminus of I-15 Bus.; I-15 exit 93
See I-15 (mile 92.734–115.610)
Bonneville	Idaho Falls	328.980	529.442	116	I-15 north / West 33rd South – Idaho Falls, Butte	Eastern end of I-15 overlap; western end of I-15 Bus. overlap; southern terminus of I-15 Bus.; I-15 exit 116
Bonneville	Idaho Falls	331.102	532.857		US 91 south (South Yellowstone Avenue) / West Sunnyside Road – Ammon	Northern terminus of US 91; destination signed eastbound only
Bonneville	Idaho Falls	333.044	535.982		I-15 BL north / US 20 Bus. west (West Broadway Street) to I-15 / Elm Street – Butte, Arco	Eastern end of I-15 Bus. overlap; western end of US 20 Bus. overlap; To I-15, Butte signed eastbound only
Bonneville	Idaho Falls	334.374	538.123		US 20 Bus. north (North Holmes Avenue) / North Holmes Avenue – West Yellowstone	Eastern end of US 20 Bus. overlap
Bonneville	Beachs Corner	338.123– 338.240	544.156– 544.345		SH-43 north (North Yellowstone Highway) / Ammon Road – Rigby	Southern terminus of SH-43
Bonneville		347.787	559.709		US 26 Bus. east (East Ririe Highway) / North 115th East Road – Rigby, Roberts, Ririe	Western terminus of US 26 Bus.; destinations signed eastbound only
Bonneville		349.294	562.134		US 26 Bus. west (130th Road East) to SH-48 – Ririe	Eastern terminus of US 26 Bus.
Bonneville	Swan Valley	376.950	606.642		SH-31 north – Victor, Driggs	Southern terminus of SH-31
Bonneville		402.500	647.761		US 26 east – Jackson	Continuation into Wyoming
1.000 mi = 1.609 km; 1.000 km = 0.621 mi: Concurrency terminus

== Special routes ==
- U.S. Route 26 Business (Ririe, Idaho)

U.S. Route 26
Previous state: Terminus	Oregon	Next state: Wyoming
