= Idaho State Highway 46 =

State highway in southern Idaho that runs north–south across the Magic Valley region

State Highway 46
- SH-46 highlighted in red

Route information
- Maintained by ITD
- Length: 57.222 mi (92.090 km)

Major junctions
- South end: US 30 in Buhl
- I-84 in Wendell; US 26 in Gooding
- North end: US 20 near Fairfield

Location
- Country: United States
- State: Idaho
- Counties: Twin Falls, Gooding, Camas

Highway system
- Idaho State Highway System; Interstate; US; State
← SH-45	→ SH-47

State Highway 46 (SH-46) is a 57.222-mile-long (92.090 km) state highway in southern Idaho that runs north–south across the Magic Valley region. It connects U.S. Route 30 (US-30) in Buhl to Interstate 84 (I-84) in Wendell, US-26 in Gooding, and US-20 east of Fairfield.

== Route description ==
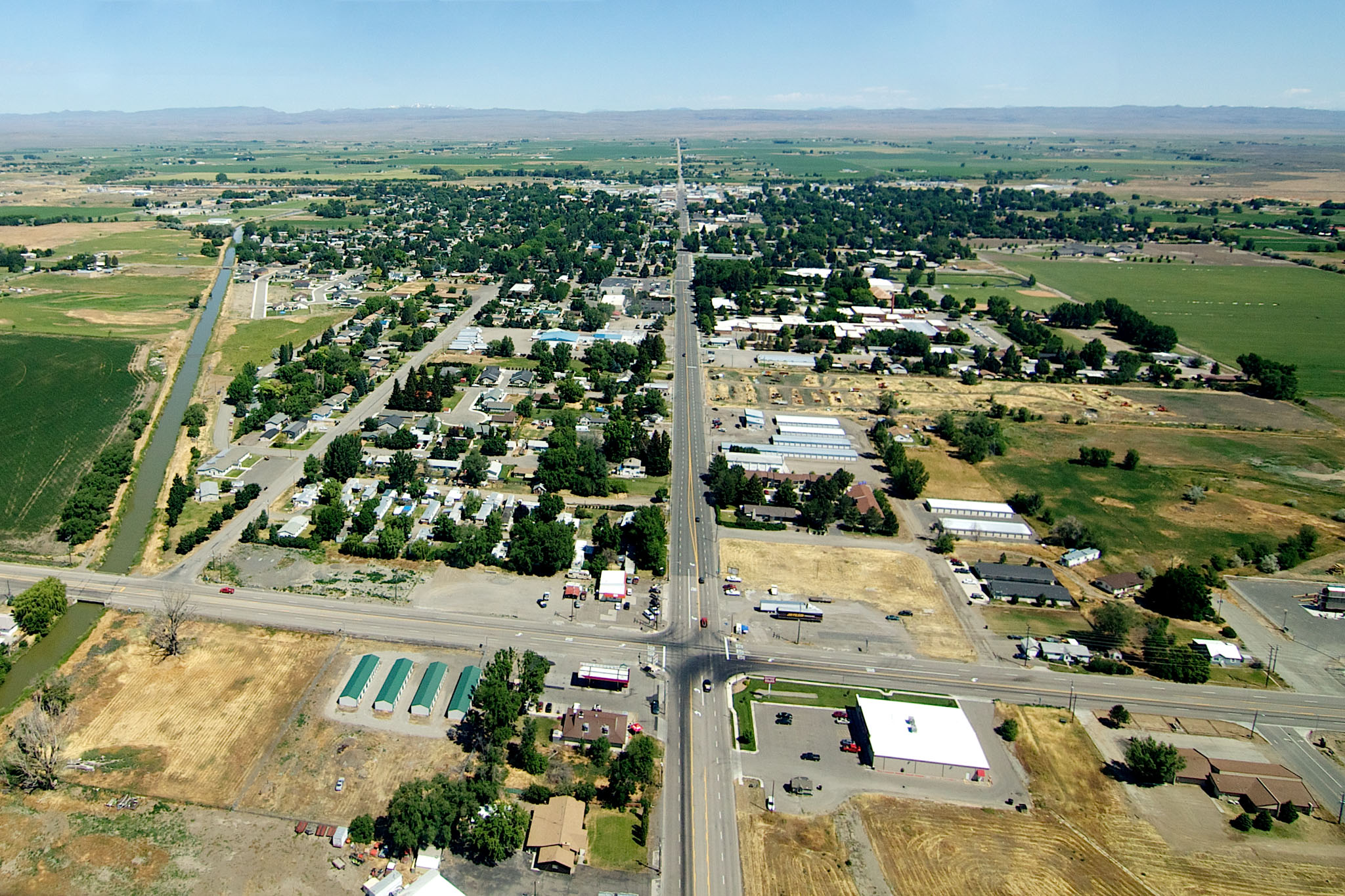
SH-46 crossing US 26 and heading north through Gooding, July 2011

SH-46 begins at a junction with US 30 in eastern Buhl, located in Twin Falls County. The highway travels north along North 1500 East (Clear Lakes Road), skirting the east side of the city and crossing the tracks of the Eastern Idaho Railroad, and travels through a rural area while descending a 6 percent grade near Clear Springs. SH-46 crosses over the Snake River on Ken Curtis Bridge near Clear Lake Park and enters Gooding County, ascending from the river canyon and turning east onto 3500 South (Bob Barton Road). The highway continues north on the Rex Leland Highway to an interchange with Interstate 84 in southern Wendell.

SH-46 travels north through Wendell on Idaho Street and intersects Main Street, which carries a short spur route that connects it to another interchange with I-84. The highway continues north to Gooding, where it intersects US 26 and passes the Idaho School for the Deaf and Blind. After leaving the city and crossing the Big Wood River, SH-46 veers northeasterly to avoid several buttes and hills in the Mount Bennett Hills, crossing into Camas County. Near the McHan Reservoir, the highway reaches the summit of Johnson Hill, located at an elevation of 5,635 feet (1,718 m), and begins its descent into the Camas Prairie. After descending over 500 feet (150 m), it turns northwest and reaches its northern terminus with US 20, four miles (6.4 km) east of Fairfield.

== History ==
SH-46 originally terminated at the I-84 interchange in Wendell, while the remaining 15 miles (24.1 km) of the Rex Leland Highway to Buhl was under local ownership. The Ken Curtis Bridge, connecting the highway to Buhl, was constructed over the Snake River in 1968. In 1997, the Idaho Transportation Department (ITD) agreed to take over maintenance and ownership of the highway once right of way for a wider roadway was acquired and prepared. Planning for the new highway, including several alternative routings between Buhl and the Wendell interchange, began in 1999. Major reconstruction of the highway was completed in 2009 and the ITD agreed in September 2010 to sign the highway as part of SH-46.

== Major intersections ==
County	Location	mi	km	Destinations	Notes
Twin Falls	Buhl	0.000	0.000	US 30 (Broadway Avenue)	
Gooding	Wendell	14.811	23.836	I-84 – Boise, Twin Falls	
Gooding	Wendell	15.460	24.880	SH-46 Spur west (Main Street) to I-84 – Hagerman	
Gooding	Gooding	25.732	41.412	US 26 – Bliss, Shoshone	
Camas		57.222	92.090	US 20 to SH-75 – Fairfield	
1.000 mi = 1.609 km; 1.000 km = 0.621 mi

== Spur route ==
State Highway 46 Spur
- Location: Wendell
- Length: 1.181 mi (1.901 km)

State Highway 46 Spur is a short route connecting I-84 and SH-46 in Wendell.
