= Idaho State Highway 79 =

State highway in Jerome, Idaho, United States

State Highway 79
- SH-79 highlighted in red

Route information
- Maintained by ITD
- Length: 0.257 mi (414 m)
- History: 2007: northern end truncated to I-84 interchange

Major junctions
- South end: I-84 in Jerome
- North end: I-84 in Jerome

Location
- Country: United States
- State: Idaho
- Counties: Jerome

Highway system
- Idaho State Highway System; Interstate; US; State
← SH-78	→ SH-81

State Highway 79 (SH-79) is a 0.25-mile-long (400 m) state highway in southern Jerome, Idaho, United States. It comprises the overpass for South Lincoln Avenue at its interchange with Interstate 84 (I-84) near the southern edge of the city. Until 2007, the highway extended 2.5 miles (4.0 km) farther north to downtown Jerome, where it terminated at SH-25.

== Route description ==
SH-79 is wholly located within the diamond interchange for Lincoln Avenue on I-84 (exit 168) in southern Jerome. The highway comprises the four-lane South Lincoln Avenue overpass and portions of the roadway between the interchange's eastbound and westbound ramps.

In 2016, the highway had an average daily traffic volume of 13,490 vehicles.

== History ==
SH-79 was originally 2.564 miles (4.126 km) long, stretching from I-84 north to SH-25 (Main Street) in central Jerome. The highway was truncated at the request of the Jerome city government, who accepted maintenance responsibilities and were paid by the state government for future maintenance and rehabilitation work. The Idaho Transportation Board approved the relinquishment of the northern 2.30 miles (3.70 km) of SH-79 on May 17, 2007.

== Major junctions ==
The entire route is in Jerome, Jerome County.

mi	km	Destinations	Notes
0.000	0.000	Golf Course Road south	Continuation south from southern terminus
0.000	0.000	I-84 west – Wendell, Boise	Southern terminus; eastbound off and on ramps; I-84 exit 168
0.257	0.414	I-84 east – Twin Falls, Pocatello	Northern terminus; westbound on and off ramps; I-84 exit 168
0.257	0.414	S. Lincoln Avenue north	Continuation north from northern terminus; former routing of SH-79
1.000 mi = 1.609 km; 1.000 km = 0.621 mi
