= Idaho State Highway 69 =

State highway in Ada County, Idaho, United States

State Highway 69
- SH-69 highlighted in red

Route information
- Maintained by ITD
- Length: 8.012 mi (12.894 km)

Major junctions
- South end: East Avalon Street & North Orchard Avenue in Kuna
- North end: I-84 / US 30 / SH-55 in Meridian

Location
- Country: United States
- State: Idaho
- Counties: Ada

Highway system
- Idaho State Highway System; Interstate; US; State
← SH-67	→ SH-71

State Highway 69 (SH-69) is a 8.012-mile (12.894 km) state highway in Ada County, Idaho, United States, that connects East Avalon Street and North Orchard Avenue in Kuna with Interstate 84/U.S. Route 30/Idaho State Highway 55 (I-84/US 30/SH-55) in Meridian. SH-69 is the northern part of the Western Heritage Historic Byway, in the National Scenic Byways Program. SH-69 is a five-lane road for its entire length.

== Route description ==
SH-69 begins at the intersection of East Avalon and Orchard streets in Kuna, about a block north of Indian Creek. (From the intersection North Orchard Street heads north into a residential area of the city, while South Orchard Road heads south to end at Indian Creek. East Avalon Street continues westerly toward downtown Kuna. The Western Heritage Historic Byway initially continues west along East Avalon Street, but quickly turns south along South Swan Falls Road to cross the Indian River and continue on toward Swan Falls.)

From its southern terminus SH-69 heads east along East Avalon Street for about three blocks before temporarily leaving the Kuna city limits and entering unincorporated Ada County. SH-69 then promptly curves to head north along North Meridian Road, connecting with the west end of East Kuna Road at a T intersection within the curve. SH-69 quickly begins running along the city line for just under one mile (1.6 km) before crossing East Deer Flat Road. Continuing north in unincorporated Ada County, SH-69 crosses Hubbard, Columbia, Lake Hazel, Amity, and Victory roads (each of which are one mile [1.6 km] apart). Along the way SH-69 also crosses over multiple minor canals.

Upon crossing Victory Road, SH-69 enters the city limits of Meridian as it continues north along South Meridian Road. Another mile (1.6 km) north, SH-69 crosses Overland Road, then crosses over Tenmile Creek, and finally and promptly reaches its northern terminus at a single-point urban interchange with I-84/US 30/SH-55, I-84 exit 44. (From the interchange, I-84/US 30/SH-55 heads east toward Boise, Interstate 184, and Mountain Home. I-84/US 30/SH-55 heads west through Nampa and Caldwell and on toward Ontario, Oregon. South Meridian Road continues north from the interchange to pass through the downtown area of Meridian before ending just north of the city, fairly near the Boise River.)

== History ==
SH-69 originally continued north through Meridian to a junction with Idaho State Highway 44 north of Eagle. This alignment through downtown Meridian included a concurrency with US 30, which followed modern-day Franklin Road and Fairview Avenue. The concurrency was short-lived, lasting from 1973 to 1980. After SH-69 was truncated in the late 1970s, SH-55 was later realigned in 1990 to serve north–south traffic between Meridian and Eagle.

The partial cloverleaf interchange with Interstate 80N (now I-84) originally opened on September 29, 1965, as part of the Nampa–Meridian section of the freeway. It was expanded with an additional ramp in 1983. The interchange was replaced in 2015 with a single-point urban interchange that took 19 months to construct and cost $50.1 million (equivalent to US$66 in 2024)

== Future ==
Plans are being considered that could extend SH-69 southward to a conceptual bypass route that is being considered south of Kuna as listed in conceptual documents in the communities in motion program by COMPASS.

The Idaho Transportation Board began investigating a two-mile (3.2 km) extension to Kuna Mora Road in 2022.

== Major junctions ==
The entire route is in Ada County.

Location	mi	km	Destinations	Notes
Kuna	0.000	0.000	East Avalon Street west (Western Heritage Historic Byway) – Downtown Kuna	Continuation west beyond southern terminus
Kuna	0.000	0.000	North Orchard Avenue north South Orchard Avenue south – Indian Creek	Southern terminus
Meridian	7.846– 8.012	12.627– 12.894	I-84 east (Vietnam Veterans Memorial Highway) / US 30 east / SH-55 north – Boise, I-184, Mountain Home I-84 west (Vietnam Veterans Memorial Highway) / US 30 west / SH-55 south – Nampa, Caldwell, Ontario (Oregon)	Northern terminus; single-point urban interchange; I-84 exit 44; Northern end of the Western Heritage Historic Byway
Meridian	7.846– 8.012	12.627– 12.894	South Meridian Road – Downtown Meridian	Continuation north beyond northern terminus
1.000 mi = 1.609 km; 1.000 km = 0.621 mi

== See also ==
- List of state highways in Idaho
