= Interstate 184 =

Interstate Highway spur in Boise, Idaho, United States

Interstate 184
- Boise Connector
- I-184 highlighted in red

Route information
- Auxiliary route of I-84
- Maintained by ITD
- Length: 3.62 mi (5.83 km)
- Existed: 1968–present
- History: Completed in 1992
- NHS: Entire route

Major junctions
- West end: I-84 / US 30 in Boise
- East end: US 20 / US 26 in Boise

Location
- Country: United States
- State: Idaho
- Counties: Ada

Highway system
- Interstate Highway System; Main; Auxiliary; Suffixed; Business; Future; Idaho State Highway System; Interstate; US; State
← SH-167	→ SH-200

Interstate 184 (I-184) is a short auxiliary Interstate Highway in Boise, Idaho, United States. The only auxiliary Interstate in Idaho, it is a spur route of I-84 that connects the freeway to Downtown Boise, terminating at US Highway 20 (US 20) and US 26 on the west side of the Boise River.

The western section of the freeway, named the Boise Connector, opened to traffic in December 1968. It was designated as I-180N until a renumbering of I-84 that was approved in 1979. I-184 was extended to a new interchange with US 20 and US 26 in 1992 as part of a new Downtown Boise connector and bridge.

== Route description ==
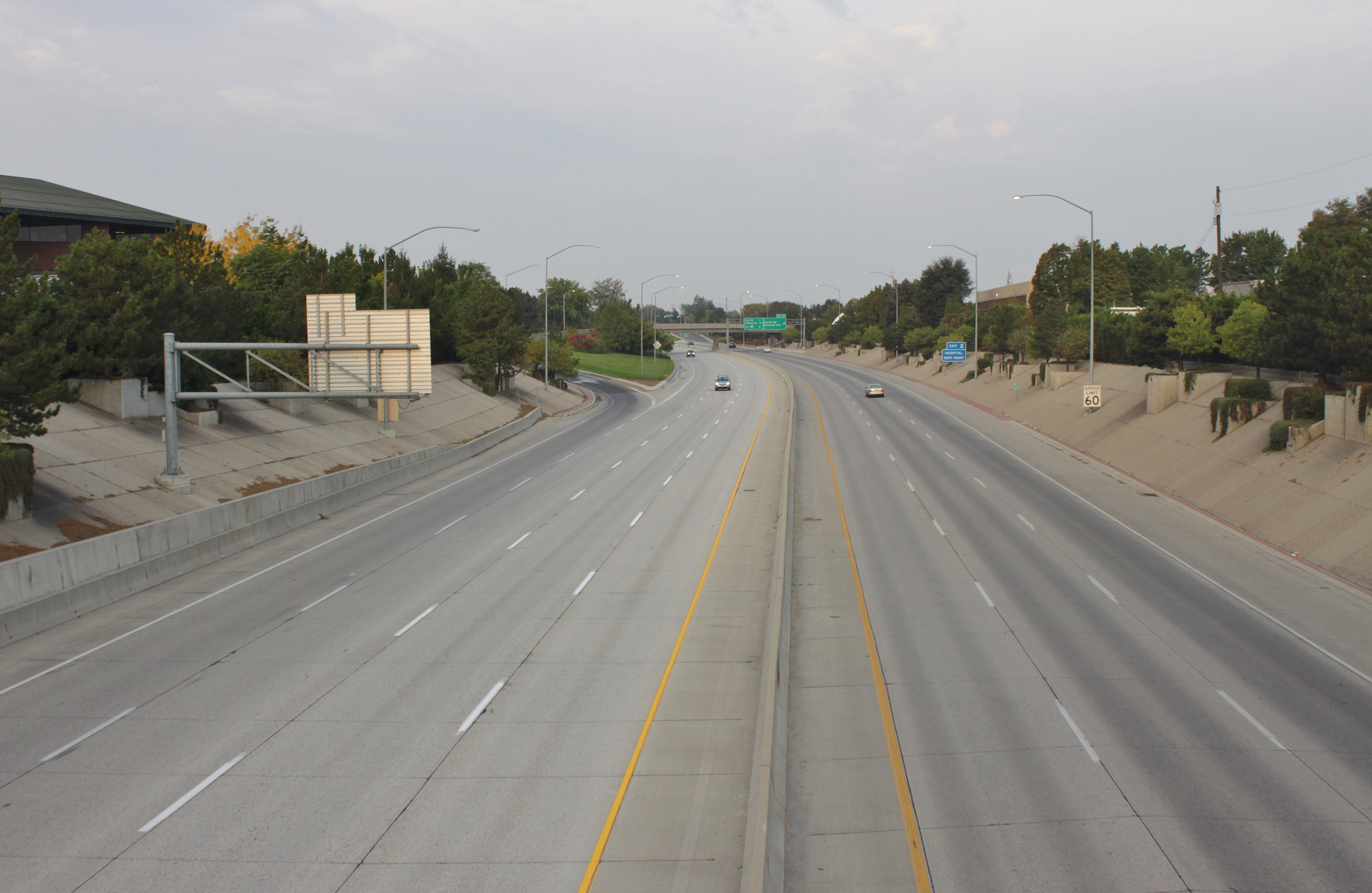
Westbound on I-184 from Orchard Street near Downtown Boise

I-184, also known as the Boise Connector or just the "Connector", is a short, six-lane urban freeway that travels between a junction with I-84 and the west side of Downtown Boise. Its western terminus is the "Flying Wye" interchange with I-84 and US 30 in southwestern Boise, which includes a braided ramp for adjacent exits on both freeways. I-184 travels northeast and crosses over a spur railroad near an interchange with Franklin Street on the south side of the Boise Towne Square shopping mall. The freeway then intersects Curtis Road near the Saint Alphonsus Regional Medical Center and turns due east along Fairview Avenue, which acts as a frontage road. On the west side of the Boise River in Rotary Park, I-184 terminates after an interchange with US 20 and US 26, which serve northwestern Boise and Garden City on Chinden Boulevard. US 20 and US 26 supersede I-184 and cross into Downtown Boise, where they split into the paired one-way Front and Myrtle streets.

I-184 is the only auxiliary Interstate Highway in Idaho and the state's shortest, at 3.62 miles (5.83 km). The highway is maintained by the Idaho Transportation Department (ITD), which conducts an annual survey of traffic on certain highway segments that is expressed in terms of annual average daily traffic (AADT), a measure of traffic volume for any average day of the year. The sole traffic recording device on I-184, tracking eastbound traffic near Cole Road, reported a daily average of 78,034 vehicles on the highway in 2022. From 2015 to 2022, traffic volumes increased by 3 percent—slower than other area roads—and congestion is typically worse near the Flying Wye interchange during the evening rush hour. According to the ITD, the average speed of traffic on the freeway in 2022 was 66 miles per hour (106 km/h), above the posted speed limit of 60 miles per hour (97 km/h).

== History ==
The Boise Connector was planned in the early 1960s to connect the Boise freeway bypass to Downtown Boise and its inner neighborhoods. One version of the plan proposed a full loop bisecting Downtown Boise to carry I-80N, but it was rejected in favor of a less costly spur route. The westernmost section of the connector, including a sprawling wye interchange with I-80N, began construction in July 1965 and cost $9.5 million to build. It was opened to traffic on December 12, 1968, a year before the rest of the bypass, and initially terminated at Garden Street.

Interstate 180N
- Location: Boise
- Existed: 1968–1980

The freeway was numbered Interstate 180N (I-180N) until October 13, 1979, when I-184 was adopted to match I-84, which was planned to succeed I-80N effective May 1, 1980. It was the only signed suffixed auxiliary Interstate Highway in the nation. Parts of the connector were signed as part of State Highway 55 (SH-55) until it was realigned onto Eagle Road in September 1990. Eastbound traffic on US 30 was also used a section of I-180N before merging onto Main Street and Fairview Avenue. This concurrency was eliminated in 1980, when US 30 was relocated onto I-84.

Construction of the Broadway–Chinden Connector, which would connect I-184 with downtown Boise, began in January 1988 and cost $60 million to complete. The new bridge across the Boise River was opened on August 7, 1992, replacing a pair of smaller bridges to the north. The westernmost segment of I-184, including the Flying Wye interchange, was rebuilt from 1999 to 2004 to accommodate an additional set of lanes. The project cost $86 million (equivalent to $133 million in 2023) and was delayed approximately six months due to financial constraints and delays in bridge construction in the initial phase of the project.

== Exit list ==
The entire route is in Boise, Ada County.

mi	km	Exit	Destinations	Notes
0.00	0.00		I-84 west (US 30 west) – Nampa	Western terminus; I-84 exit 49
0.67	1.08	0	I-84 east (US 30 east) – Mountain Home	Westbound exit and eastbound entrance; serves Boise Airport
1.08	1.74	1A	Franklin Road	Westbound exit also signed as "Milwaukee Street"
1.33	2.14	1B	Cole Road	Westbound exit and eastbound entrance
2.54	4.09	2	Curtis Road	Westbound exit also signed as "Fairview Avenue"
2.81– 3.09	4.52– 4.97	3	Fairview Avenue	Westbound access is part of exit 2
3.62	5.83		US 20 / US 26 east	No access to US-20/US-26 west; continuation as freeway beyond eastern terminus
1.000 mi = 1.609 km; 1.000 km = 0.621 mi: Incomplete access
