= Idaho State Highway 74 =

State highway in Idaho, United States

State Highway 74
- A map of the Twin Falls area with SH-74 highlighted in red

Route information
- Maintained by ITD
- Length: 7.835 mi (12.609 km)

Major junctions
- South end: US 93 near Knull
- North end: US 30 in Twin Falls

Location
- Country: United States
- State: Idaho

Highway system
- Idaho State Highway System; Interstate; US; State
| ← SH-72 | → SH-75 |

State Highway 74 (SH-74) is a short state highway that travels between U.S. Route 93 and U.S. Route 30 in downtown Twin Falls. The road is located entirely in Twin Falls County.

== Route description ==
State Highway 74 begins at a junction with U.S. Route 93 southwest of Twin Falls. The highway heads east through some farmland as E 3600 N, turning north to N 2900 E near the Magic Valley Regional Airport. It enters Twin Falls as Washington Street (later Shoshone Street) and crosses Rock Creek to reach downtown. The highway terminates at an intersection with 2nd Avenue, which carries U.S. Route 30 through downtown Twin Falls.

== Major intersections ==
The entire route is in Twin Falls County.

| Location | mi | km | Destinations | Notes |
|---|---|---|---|---|
| | 0.010 | 0.016 | US 93 – Jackpot, NV, Wells | |
| Twin Falls | 7.835 | 12.609 | US 30 (2nd Avenue) – Burley, Buhl | |
1.000 mi = 1.609 km; 1.000 km = 0.621 mi
