= Idaho State Highway 27 =

State highway in Idaho, United States

State Highway 27
- SH-27 highlighted in red

Route information
- Maintained by ITD
- Length: 26.561 mi (42.746 km)

Major junctions
- South end: Oakley
- US 30 in Burley; I-84 near Burley
- North end: SH-25 in Paul

Location
- Country: United States
- State: Idaho
- Counties: Cassia, Minidoka

Highway system
- Idaho State Highway System; Interstate; US; State
← US 26	→ SH-28

State Highway 27 (SH-27) is a state highway in Idaho, United States, that runs from Oakley to SH-25 in Paul.

== Route description ==
SH-27 begins in the town of Oakley and leaves the center of town on Center Street, heading due north. The highway makes a slight bend to the northeast before continuing north and entering the town of Burley as Overland Avenue. SH-27 intersects U.S. Route 30 (US 30) and runs concurrently with Interstate 84 Business (I-84 Bus.) as it leaves the town, heading north before turning northeast and intersecting I-84, where I-84 Business ends. The road continues north as 600 West Road, where it ends in the town of Paul at SH-25.

== Junction list ==
County	Location	mi	km	Destinations	Notes
Cassia	Oakley	0.000	0.000	Center Avenue / Main Street	
Cassia	Burley	21.807	35.095	US 30 / I-84 BL	Southern end of I-84 BL concurrency
Minidoka		24.106	38.795	I-84	Northern end of I-84 BL concurrency
Minidoka	Paul	26.561	42.746	SH-25	
1.000 mi = 1.609 km; 1.000 km = 0.621 mi: Concurrency terminus

== See also ==
- List of state highways in Idaho
- List of highways numbered 27
