= Idaho State Highway 81 =

State highway in Idaho, United States

State Highway 81

Route information
- Maintained by ITD
- Length: 33.978 mi (54.682 km)
- Existed: 1972–present

Major junctions
- South end: SH-77 in Malta
- SH-77 in Declo
- North end: US 30 in Burley

Location
- Country: United States
- State: Idaho
- Counties: Cassia

Highway system
- Idaho State Highway System; Interstate; US; State
← SH-79	→ I-84

State Highway 81 (SH-81) is a state highway in Cassia County, Idaho. The highway runs for 33.978 miles (54.682 km) from SH-77 in Malta to U.S. Route 30 (US-30) in Burley. It also has a short spur route connecting the highway to Interstate 84 (I-84) at the Yale Interchange.

Prior to its designation as SH-81 in 1972, the highway was part of U.S. Route 30S (US-30S), a multi-state national highway that traveled from Burley to Granger, Wyoming.

== Route description ==
State Highway 81 begins at an intersection with SH-77 in Malta, located north of the Utah state line. The highway travels north, following the eastern foothills of the Cotterell Mountains and the Raft River valley, through Idahome to Interstate 84, which it parallels for several miles heading northwest. SH-81 completes its turn west and heads towards Declo, intersecting SH-77. The highway continues west along the southern side of the Snake River, parallel to the Eastern Idaho Railroad. It terminates at an intersection with US-30 (co-signed with Interstate 84 Business) south of Burley Municipal Airport on the banks of the Snake River, just east of downtown Burley.

== History ==
U.S. Route 30S, which traveled from Burley to Granger, Wyoming via Logan, Utah, was established in 1926 as an alternative route to U.S. Route 30N. It was moved to the completed Interstate 80N (later I-84) in 1970, and decommissioned entirely in 1972. SH-81 was established by the Idaho State Board of Highway Directors on September 12, 1972, to preserve state maintenance of the highway between Burley and the Utah state line.

In 1983, the Idaho Transportation Board studied an extension of SH-81 from Burley to Twin Falls to replace an existing section of US 30. It was later truncated in the early 1990s to its current terminus at SH-77 in Malta.

== Major intersections ==
The entire route is in Cassia County.

Location	mi	km	Destinations	Notes
Malta	0.000	0.000	SH-77 north (Center Street) – Albion	
	15.166	24.407	SH-81 Spur (Yale Road) to I-84	
Declo	26.216	42.191	SH-77 (Clark Street) to I-84 – Albion, Rupert	
Burley	33.978	54.682	US 30 / I-84 BL – Burley, Heyburn	
1.000 mi = 1.609 km; 1.000 km = 0.621 mi

== Spur route ==
State Highway 81 Spur
- Location: near Idahome, Idaho
- Length: 0.337 mi (542 m)
- Existed: 1972–present

ID-81 has a spur route connecting the main highway to Interstate 84, traveling 0.337 miles (0.542 km) east along Yale Road to the Yale Interchange.

== See also ==
- List of state highways in Idaho
