= Idahome, Idaho =

Unincorporated community in Idaho, United States

- Unincorporated community
- Location within Idaho Location within the United States
- Coordinates: 42°24′56″N 113°23′59″W
- Country: United States
- State: Idaho
- County: Cassia
- Elevation: 4,426 ft (1,349 m)
- Time zone: UTC-7 (Mountain (MST))
  - Summer (DST): UTC-6 (MDT)
- Area codes: 208, 986
- GNIS feature ID: 399928

Idahome is an unincorporated community in Cassia County, Idaho, United States. Idahome is located along Idaho State Highway 81 7.5 miles (12.1 km) north-northwest of Malta. The community was named by a railroad surveying party that found a bag labeled "Idahome Flour Co." at the site; the railroad made the place a stop with the flour company's name.
