= Wendell School District =

School district in Idaho, United States

Location
- Wendell Idaho United States

District information
- Type: Public
- Grades: Pre K-12
- Established: 1909
- Superintendent: Ryan Bowman
- Schools: 3
- Budget: $10.5 million in the general fund

Students and staff
- Students: 1100

Other information
- Website: www.sd232.k12.id.us

Wendell School District 232 is a school district headquartered in Wendell, Idaho. It includes a section of Gooding County. It covers approximately 115 square miles of agricultural land in southern Idaho. The district operates three schools serving around 1,100 students in pre-k through twelfth grade.

== History ==
The first school in Wendell was named the Rhodes School and built on land donated by Ambrose Rhodes in the 1880s, the same site as Wendell's current magnet school on Wendell Boulevard. As the school grew, it changed its name to Wendell Academy in 1891. Several schools in the area consolidated to form the Wendell School District in 1909.

=== Leadership ===
Lawrence LaRue had been both superintendent and the high school principal. In 1980 he resigned both as superintendent and as principal. Glen Gilbertson became superintendent in 1980, at the same time as two principals of the elementary and high schools. Greg Lowe served as superintendent for fourteen years before announcing his retirement in October 2017. As of May 2026, the current superintendent is Ryan Bowman.

In 2005, Rob Sauer, principal of Wendell Middle School, received the Milken Family Foundation National Educator Award, presented by Idaho State Superintendent Marilyn Howard.

== Academics ==
In 2013, Wendell School District implemented a four-day school week. Superintendent Greg Lowe cited state budget cuts and the potential to reduce transportation and utility costs as the primary motivations, while also noting benefits for student attendance. Fridays are used for teacher development programs and enrichment activities.

Student performance on Idaho's standardized assessments falls below state averages. As of spring 2024, approximately 38% of students in kindergarten through third grade were reading at grade level, compared to a statewide average of roughly 84% in similarly-sized neighboring districts. District-wide, approximately 40% of students test at or above proficiency in reading and 28% in math, compared to statewide averages of 55% and 42% respectively.

== Demographics ==
Enrollment grew from 1,056 in 2021 to 1,104 in 2024.

As of 2020, nearly 70% of students in Wendell School District are of Latino or Hispanic heritage. The district serves approximately 1,100 students. 74% of whom are from low-income families, and 37% of whom are learning English. About 11% have disabilities and 11% are from migrant families.

== Schools ==
- Wendell High School
- Wendell Middle School
- Wendell Elementary School
