= Wendell High School =

Coordinates: 42°46′34″N 114°41′28″W

Location
- 850 East Main Street; Wendell, Idaho 83355; United States

Information
- Type: Public
- School district: Wendell School District
- Principal: Justin Alsterlund
- Grades: 9-12
- Enrollment: 329 (2023-2024)
- Colors: Navy and gold
- Athletics conference: IHSAA 2A
- Mascot: Trojan
- Website: http://www.wendellschools.org

Wendell High School is a four-year public secondary school in Wendell, Idaho. It is the main high school operated by the Wendell School District.

== Athletics ==
Wendell High School is classified as a 2A school (enrollment between 160 and 319) by the IHSAA. It competes in the Sawtooth Central Conference.

School colors are navy and gold, and the mascot is the Trojan.

== See also ==
- List of high schools in Idaho
