= List of state highways in Idaho =

- Highway markers for State Highways 3, 75 and 200

Highway names
- Interstates: Interstate X (I-X)
- US Highways: U.S. Route X (US-X)

System links
- Idaho State Highway System; Interstate; US; State

The Idaho Transportation Department (ITD) is responsible for the establishment and classification of a state highway network, including 5,000 miles (8,000 km) of roads that are classified as Interstate Highways, U.S. Highways, and state highways within the state of Idaho in the United States. The current state highway marker consists of a white background, black numbering, and a solid black geographic outline of the state of Idaho.

== History ==
Marker design prior to 2020

Scenic state highway marker formerly used on Idaho State Highway 21

During the 1920s, in lieu of numbering its highways, Idaho had a system of lettered Sampson Trails. They were marked by businessman Charles B. Sampson of Boise at no expense to the state, using orange-colored shields. By 1929, the trails system had included 6,500 miles (10,500 km) of marked highways that covered most of the state. By the mid-1930s, the state had adopted a more standard system of numbered state highways.

In 1978, the ITD began using brown state highway markers to denote scenic Idaho highways, in addition to the main highway markers that featured a black background and white lettering and the name "IDAHO" in black lettering inside a white geographic outline of the state. The brown markers were discontinued around 2012, and in April 2020, ITD changed the coloring of the main state highway marker to its current color scheme, also adding a wide version of the marker for three-digit highways and removing the word "IDAHO" from all markers in the process.

== Sampson Trails ==
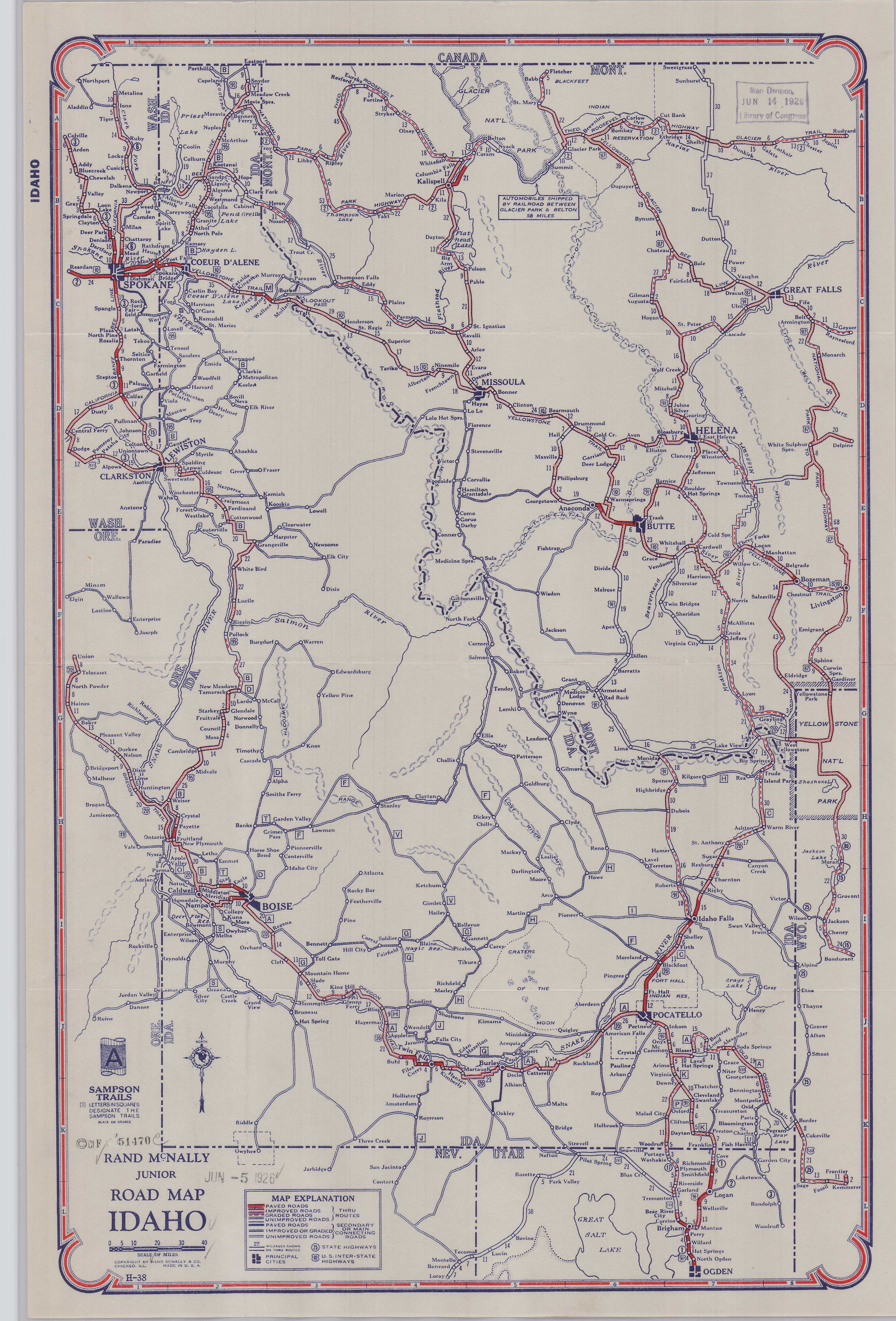
Rand McNally Atlas from 1926 showing the Sampson Trails as well as US Highways

The following Sampson Trails were marked:

- A, Boise to Wyoming via Twin Falls and Pocatello; became US-30 and US-30N
- B, Boise to Canada via Lewiston and Coeur d'Alene; became US-30, US-30N, US-95, and SH-1
- C, Pocatello to Montana via Idaho Falls; became US-91 and US-191
- D, Boise to New Meadows via Banks; became SH-15 (today's SH-55)
- E, not on the 1926 map
- F, Boise to Blackfoot via Stanley; became SH-21, SH-17, US-93 (today's SH-75), and SH-27
- G, Mountain Home to Picabo via Fairfield; became SH-22 (today's US-20)
- H, Bliss to Trude via Arco; became SH-24, SH-23, SH-22, SH-29, and an unnumbered road (today's US-20 and US-26)
- I, Pioneer to Idaho Falls; became an unnumbered road
- J, Nevada to Shoshone via Twin Falls; became US-93
- K, Utah to McCammon via Preston; became US-91
- L, not on the 1926 map
- M, Washington to Montana via Coeur d'Alene; became US-10
- N, Bonners Ferry to Montana; became US-2
- O, Oregon to Caldwell; became SH-49 and SH-18
- P, Utah to Downey; became SH-36
- Q, Declo to Fairfield; became SH-25 and SH-46
- R, not on the 1926 map
- S, Oregon to Nampa; became unnumbered road and SH-45
- T, Star to Grimes Pass; became SH-16, unnumbered road, and SH-17
- U, Utah to Montpelier; became SH-35
- V, Hailey to Stanley; became US-93 (today's SH-75)
- W, not on the 1926 map
- X, not on the 1926 map
- Y, Bonners Ferry to Canada; became US-95

== State highways ==
Number	Length (mi)	Length (km)	Southern or western terminus	Northern or eastern terminus	Formed	Removed	Notes
SH-1	12.279	19.761	US-95 near Copeland	Hwy 21 at Porthill	1932	current	
SH-3	—	—	US-95 / US-195 (now US 2) in Ponderay	MT 3 near Clark Fork	1929	1940	Replaced by US-10 Alternate
SH-3	117.680	189.388	US-12 near Spalding	I-90 near Rose Lake	1953	current	
SH-4	7.380	11.877	I-90 in Wallace	National Forest Road No. 7623 at Burke	1929	current	
SH-5	19.140	30.803	US-95 in Plummer	SH-3 in Saint Maries	1929	current	
SH-6	40.645	65.412	SR 272 near Potlatch	SH-3 near Santa	1929	current	
SH-7	16.563	26.656	Russell Ridge Road near Orofino	Old Highway 7 in Ahsahka	1929	current	Formerly continued north to Harvard and south to Grangeville
SH-8	53.589	86.243	SR 270 in Moscow	1st Street in Elk River	1929	current	
SH-9	—	—	US-95 in Spalding	S-412 at the Montana state line	1929	1962	Replaced by US-12
SH-9	13.522	21.762	SH-8 near Deary	SH-6 near Harvard	1965	current	
SH-10	—	—	SH-7 in Greencreek	SH-9 (now US 12) in Kamiah	1952	1953	Duplicated US 10; renumbered SH-62
SH-11	42.481	68.367	US-12 in Greer	Forest Service Road No. 247 near Headquarters	1929	current	
SH-12	—	—	US-95 Business in Craigmont	SH-62 in Kamiah	1929	1962	Renumbered SH-64 because US-12 extended into Idaho
SH-13	26.390	42.471	US-95 in Grangeville	US-12 near Kooskia	1929	current	
SH-14	49.515	79.687	SH-13 near Harpster	Airport Road in Elk City	1929	current	
SH-15	—	—	US-95 near Marsing	US-30 in Boise	1929	1967	Renumbered as SH-55 (which continued west from Boise) because of I-15
SH-16	16.005	25.758	US-26 near Star	SH-52 in Emmett	1929	current	
SH-17	—	—	SH-15 (now SH-55) in Banks	Crouch	1929	1960	Now Banks-Lowman road; formerly continued east to Lowman; until 1938 continued east to Stanley;
SH-18	—	—	US-30 in Fruitland	US-30 in Caldwell	1929	1940	Replaced by US-95 and US-20 (US-26 was added to this section of US-20 as a concurrency in 1952)
SH-18	—	—	Oregon state line	US-95 in Parma	1953	1975	Now Wanstad Road and Roswell Road
SH-19	19.915	32.050	OR 201 near Homedale	I-84 Business in Caldwell	1929	current	
SH-20	—	—	US-95 near Marsing	US-30 near Nampa	1929	1953	Renumbered SH-72 because US-20 extended into Idaho; now part of SH-55; until 1939, continued southwest to Oregon state line
SH-21	130.869	210.613	I-84 in Boise	SH-75 in Stanley	1929	current	
SH-22	43.936	70.708	SH-33 near Howe	I-15 in Dubois	1929	current	Originally continued west to Mountain Home
SH-23	—	—	US-93 in Shoshone	SH-22 in Carey	1929	1941	Replaced by US-93 Alternate (now US-93) and US-20 Temp (now US-26)
SH-23	—	—	US-93 (now SH-75) in Bellevue	SH-68 (now US-20) in Picabo	1953	1971	Now Gannett Road; originally continued east to Carey
SH-24	67.533	108.684	I-84 / US-30 in Heyburn	US-93 in Shoshone	1929	current	Originally continued west to Bliss
SH-25	58.048	93.419	I-84 near Jerome	I-84 / SH-77 near Declo	1929	current	
SH-26	7.835	12.609	US-93 near Knull	US-30 in Twin Falls	1929	1953	Renumbered SH-74 because US-26 extended into Idaho
SH-27	7.835	12.609	US-93 in Challis	US-91 in Blackfoot	1929	1941	Replaced by US-93 Alternate (now US-93) and US-20 (now US-26)
SH-27	26.561	42.746	Main Street in Oakley	SH-25 in Paul	1950	current	
SH-28	135.645	218.299	SH-33 near Mud Lake	US-93 in Salmon	1929	current	
SH-29	—	—	SH-27 (now US-26) in Arco	US-91 in Dubois	1929	1938	Replaced by SH-22
SH-29	—	—	US-91 in Idaho Falls	Wyoming border	1938	1952	Former portion of SH-22; replaced by US-26
SH-29	13.614	21.910	SH-28 in Leadore	Montana Secondary Highway 324 at Bannock Pass	1953	current	
SH-31	—	—	US-191 (now US 20) in Island Park	Montana state line at Raynolds Pass	1929	1934	Later restored as SH-96, later SH-287, now later SH-87
SH-31	21.025	33.836	US-26 in Swan Valley	SH-33 in Victor	1934	current	
SH-32	28.386	45.683	SH-33 near Tetonia	SH-47 near Ashton	1929	current	
SH-33	155.084	249.584	US-20 / US-26 near Arco	WYO 22 near Victor	1929	current	
SH-34	105.980	170.558	US-91 / SH-36 in Preston	WYO 239 near Freedom	1929	current	Formerly continued south to the Utah border
SH-35	—	—	SH-40 (now US-89) in Geneva	Utah state line	1929	1939	Replaced by US-89
SH-35	—	—	US-91 in Red Rock Junction	Utah state line	1953	1962	Now Old Oxford Highway and Oxford Highway
SH-36	—	—	US-91 in Downey	Utah state line	1929	1938	replaced by US-191 (now I-15)
SH-36	73.313	117.986	I-15 near Malad City	US-89 in Ovid	1962	current	
SH-37	31.231	50.261	Onedia–Power county line near Holbrook	I-86 near American Falls	1929	current	Formerly continued to Malad City
SH-38	—	—	Power/Bannock County Line south of Pocatello	SH-37 east of Holbrook	1929	1960	Now Arbon Valley Road, Arbon Valley Highway, and Bannock Highway; continued north to Pocatello until 1955
SH-38	23.438	37.720	North Holbrook Road near Holbrook	I-15 in Malad City	1985	current	Formerly part of SH-37
SH-39	52.924	85.173	I-86 in American Falls	US-26 in Blackfoot	1929	current	
SH-40	—	—	Wyoming state line	SH-35 (now US-89) in Geneva	1929	1939	Replaced by US-89
SH-40	2.737	4.405	I-15 near Downey	US-91 in Downey	1972	current	
SH-41	39.058	62.858	I-90 in Post Falls	US-2 in Oldtown	1931	current	
SH-42	—	—	SH-7 in Kendrick	US-12 near Spalding	1934	1965	Replaced by SH-3; originally continued north to Harvard
SH-43	—	—	SH-7 in Ahsahka	SH-42 in Kendrick	1934	1946	Restored as part of rerouted SH-7 in 1953; now Old Highway 7
SH-43	—	—	US-95 Alternate near Santa	Elk River	1953	1965	Replaced by SH-3 and SH-8
SH-43	3.868	6.225	US-26 at Beachs Corner	US-20 in Ucon	1978	current	
SH-44	23.089	37.158	I-84 near Caldwell	US-20 / US-26 in Garden City	1934	current	
SH-45	17.985	28.944	SH-78 at Walters Ferry	I-84 Business in Nampa	1934	current	
SH-46	43.052	69.285	I-84 near Wendell	US-20 near Fairfield	1935	current	
SH-47	12.420	19.988	US-20 near Warm River	Wyoming state line	1935	1957	
SH-47	12.420	19.988	US-20 in Ashton	Caribou-Targhee National Forest near Warm River	1958	current	
SH-48	24.409	39.282	I-15 near Roberts	US-26 Business in Ririe	1935	current	
SH-49	—	—	Washington state line	US-95 near Parma	1937	1940	Replaced by US-20 (US-26 was added to this section of US-20 as a concurrency in 1952)
SH-49	—	—	SH-48 near Menan	97th north near Idaho Falls	1953	1962	Until 1957, continued south to US 20/US 191 (now Business US 20); now 5th East/3400 East, 100 North, and 3500 East
SH-50	8.092	13.023	US-30 near Kimberly	SH-25 near Eden	1938	current	
SH-51	93.598	150.631	Nevada State Route 225 near Owyhee, Nevada	I-84 Business in Mountain Home	1938	current	
SH-52	54.126	87.107	OR 52 in Payette	SH-55 in Horseshoe Bend	1938	current	
SH-52A	54.126	87.107	Payette River	SH-52 near Emmett	1953	1973	now Black Canyon Highway
SH-53	14.255	22.941	SR 290 near State Line	US-95 near Hayden	1938	current	
SH-54	15.440	24.848	SH-41 in Spirit Lake	Main Avenue in Bayview	1953	current	
SH-55	—	—	US-2 in Colburn	US-10 Alternate near Kootenai	1953	1955	now Colburn-Culver Road
SH-55	156.047	251.133	US-95 near Marsing	US-95 in New Meadows	1967	current	
SH-56	—	—	US-95 in Sagle	Garfield	1953	1955	now Sagle Road, Glengary Road, and Garfield Cutoff Road
SH-57	37.230	59.916	US-2 in Priest River	Reeder Creek Road in Nordman	1953	current	
SH-58	2.943	4.736	SR 278 near Rockford, Washington	US-95 near Worley	1953	current	
SH-60	5.510	8.867	SR 274 near Tekoa, Washington	US-95 near Tensed	1959	current	
SH-61	0.740	1.191	WYO 89 near Geneva	US-89 in Geneva	1953	current	
SH-62	15.410	24.800	US-95 Business in Craigmont	SH-64 / SH-162 in Nezperce	1953	current	
SH-64	15.409	24.798	SH-62 / SH-162 in Nezperce	SH-162 in Kamiah	1962	current	Originally continued west to Craigmont
SH-66	0.992	1.596	Palouse Cove Road near Palouse, Washington	US-95 near Viola	1953	current	
SH-67	8.948	14.400	Mountain Home Air Force Base	SH-51 in Mountain Home	1953	current	
SH-68	—	—	US-30 in Mountain Home	US-20 Temp / US-26 in Carey	1953	1978	Replaced by rerouted US-20
SH-69	8.012	12.894	Orchard Avenue in Kuna	I-84 / US-30 / SH-55 in Meridian	1953	current	
SH-70	—	—	Eaton Road near Eaton	US-95 Business in Weiser	1953	1977	Now County Road 70
SH-71	28.730	46.236	US-95 in Cambridge	OR 86 near Brownlee Dam	1956	current	
SH-72	—	—	US-95 near Marsing	US-30 near Nampa	1953	1967	Renumbered as part of SH-55
SH-72	1.989	3.201	US-30 near New Plymouth	SH-52 at Hamilton Corner	1972	current	Former alignment of US-30
SH-73	—	—	US-30 in Buhl	Castleford	1953	1953	Now 1400 East, 3700 North, 1200 East, and 3600 North
SH-73	—	—	US-30 in New Plymouth	I-84	1965	1972	Replaced by rerouted US-30
SH-74	7.835	12.609	US-93 near Knull	US-30 in Twin Falls	1953	current	
SH-75	—	—	US-93 in Ketchum	Sun Valley	1953	1977	For a time continued northeast to Chilly; redesignated as a spur of the current route
SH-75	170.666	274.660	US-26 / US-93 in Shoshone	US-93 near Challis	1977	current	Former alignment of US-93
SH-76	—	—	1420 North north of Richfield	US-26 in Richfield	1953	1954	Now 3rd Street and Center Road
SH-77	30.676	49.368	SH-81 in Malta	I-84 / SH-25 near Declo	1953	current	
SH-78	99.720	160.484	SH-55 in Marsing	I-84 Business in Hammett	1972	current	
SH-79	0.257	0.414	I-84 in Jerome	I-84 in Jerome	1953	current	Unsigned highway
SH-80	—	—	SH-48 in Menan	US-20 in Lorenzo	1953	1962	Now Menan-Lorenzo Highway
SH-81	33.978	54.682	SH-77 in Malta	US-30 in Burley	1970	current	
SH-84	—	—	US-20 in Macks Inn	Big Springs	1953	1977	Now Big Springs Loop Road
SH-86	—	—	West Side Highway (formerly SH-35) in Dayton	US-91 in Preston	1953	1964	Removed from the state highway system; restored in 1985 as part of SH-36
SH-87	9.133	14.698	US-20 in Island Park	MT 87 at Raynolds Pass	1967	current	
SH-88	—	—	US-20 / US-26 near Arco	US-20 in Rexburg	1953	1977	Replaced by SH-33
SH-96	9.133	14.698	US-20 in Island Park	MT 287 at Raynolds Pass	1959	1960	renumbered SH-287 to match Montana; later renumbered SH-87 on both sides of the border
SH-97	35.745	57.526	SH-3 near Harrison	I-90 near Coeur d'Alene	1977	current	
SH-99	11.686	18.807	SH-3 in Kendrick	SH-8 in Troy	1961	current	
SH-128	2.198	3.537	SR 128 near Lewiston	US-12 in Lewiston	1989	current	
SH-162	31.077	50.014	SH-62 / SH-64 in Nezperce	US-12 in Kamiah	1993	current	Former portion of SH-62
SH-167	16.319	26.263	SH-78 in Grand View	SH-67 near Mountain Home Air Force Base	2010	current	Former portion of SH-67
SH-200	33.169	53.380	US-2 / US-95 in Ponderay	MT 200 near Clark Fork	1967	current	Formerly U.S. Route 10 Alternate
SH-287	9.133	14.698	US-20 in Island Park	MT 287 at Raynolds Pass	1960	1967	renumbered SH-87 when Montana renumbered Highway 287 to Highway 87

== See also ==
- List of Interstate Highways in Idaho
- List of U.S. Highways in Idaho
