= Sand Hollow, Idaho =

Unincorporated community in Payette and Canyon counties in Idaho, United States

- Unincorporated community
- Location within Idaho Location within the United States
- Coordinates: 43°48′28″N 116°44′57″W
- Country: United States
- State: Idaho
- County: Payette, Canyon County
- Elevation: 2,435 ft (742 m)
- Time zone: UTC-7 (Mountain (MST))
  - Summer (DST): UTC-6 (MDT)
- ZIP Code: 83607
- Area codes: 208, 986
- GNIS feature ID: 398090

Sand Hollow is an unincorporated community in Payette and Canyon counties in Idaho, United States, roughly 10 miles (16 km) north-northwest of Caldwell.

== Description ==
Sand Hollow is located along Sand Hollow Creek in Sand Hollow (valley) east of Interstate 84/U.S. Route 30 (I‑84/US 30) Sand Hollow interchange (I‑84 exit 17) along the former routing for US 30.
