= Clinton Ballou =

American academic and biochemist (1923–2021)

Clinton Edward Ballou
- Born: June 18, 1923; King Hill, Idaho
- Died: March 8, 2021 (aged 97); Alameda, California
- Education: Boise Junior College, Oregon State College, University of Wisconsin, University of Edinburgh
- Spouse: Dorothy Lun Wu
- Scientific career
- Fields: Metabolism of carbohydrates, structures of microbial cell walls
- Workplaces: University of California, Berkeley

Clinton Edward Ballou (June 18, 1923 – March 8, 2021) was an American academic who was a professor of biochemistry at the University of California, Berkeley. His research focused on the metabolism of carbohydrates and the structures of microbial cell walls. He joined the United States National Academy of Sciences in 1975.

Ballou was born in King Hill, Idaho in June 1923, to William Clinton Ballou and "Mollie" Ballou. He attended Boise Junior College, and graduated from Oregon State College, and the University of Wisconsin. He served in the U. S. Navy from 1944 to 1946.

He held a postdoctoral fellowship with E. L. Hirst in Chemistry at the University of Edinburgh. Ballou became a professor of biochemistry at the University of California, Berkeley in 1955, and became a professor emeritus in 1991.

Ballou served on the editorial board of the Journal of Biological Chemistry. He died in March 2021 at the age of 97.

== Awards ==
- 1975 National Academy of Sciences
- 1981 American Chemical Society's Claude Hudson Award in Carbohydrate Chemistry
- 1972 Welch Foundation Lectureship
- 1976 University of Notre Dame Reilly Lectureship
- 1977 Duke University Belfort Lectureship
- 1961 National Science Foundation Senior Fellowship
