= Gooding County, Idaho =

County in Idaho, United States

- County
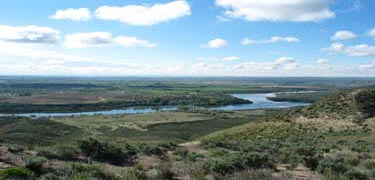
- Hagerman Fossil Beds National Monument

- Seal

- Location within the U.S. state of Idaho
- Coordinates: 42°58′N 114°48′W
- Country: United States
- State: Idaho
- Founded: January 28, 1913
- Named for: Frank R. Gooding
- Seat: Gooding
- Largest city: Gooding

Area
  - Total: 734 sq mi (1,900 km^{2})
  - Land: 729 sq mi (1,890 km^{2})
  - Water: 4.7 sq mi (12 km^{2}) 0.6%

Population (2020)
  - Total: 15,598
  - Estimate (2025): 16,446 ▲
  - Density: 21.4/sq mi (8.26/km^{2})
- Time zone: UTC−7 (Mountain)
  - Summer (DST): UTC−6 (MDT)
- Congressional district: 2nd
- Website: www.goodingcounty.org

Gooding County is a county located in the U.S. state of Idaho. As of the 2020 census, the population was 15,598. Its county seat is Gooding. The county was created by the Idaho Legislature on January 28, 1913, by a partition of Lincoln County. It is named for Frank R. Gooding, the 7th governor and a United States Senator from Idaho.

== History ==
Almost 15,000 years ago, the Hagerman Valley was formed by the Bonneville Flood which deposited thousands of smooth boulders which can be seen on the surface of the valley floor today. After the Bonneville flood, Natives settled the area starting at least 12,000 years ago. Natives came into contact with emigrants on the Oregon Trail by 1840. The Oregon Trail traversed Gooding County with many emigrants stopping at Salmon Falls on the Snake River to barter fish with the native population. While Gooding County presently contains significant farming operations, it was the discovery of gold in 1862 that brought non-native settlement to the area. Mining settlement in the area was quite small in comparison to the rush to the Boise Valley occurring at the same time. The 1863 Census of Idaho Territory indicates there were 600 miners working Snake River mining operations, possibly covering the span of the river from the Hagerman Valley to Idaho Falls. Seven years later few people remained. A camp was sustained at Salmon Falls during 1870. The U.S. Census of 1870 enumerated 28 residents for "Overland Road and Snake River"

At the time of Snake River mining operations, the mining settlements were under the jurisdiction of Idaho County, Washington Territory. They were transferred to Boise County in 1863, becoming part of Alturas County at its creation in 1864. The railroad came through the area in the early 1880s with the Toponis railroad station being established by 1883. A post office was established there by 1887. The Toponis and Hagerman Valley settlements became part of Logan County at its creation in 1889. Logan county established the Bliss, Malad, and Toponis precincts containing 340 residents at the 1890 census. These precincts were transferred to Lincoln County at the first attempt to organize it in 1891. That act was found unconstitutional. In 1895 the precincts were transferred to Blaine County for a few days before ending up in Lincoln County. The arrival of the 20th Century brought a significant increase in settlement at Wendell and Toponis. Wendell incorporated in 1902. A town was platted on land owned by Frank R. Gooding at the Toponis rail station in 1907 and incorporated under the name of Gooding in 1908. The boom in settlement is clearly reflected when comparing 1900 and 1910 U.S. Census data. From 1900 to 1910, the Gooding precinct posted a 931% increase over the population listed for Toponis in 1900. The Clear Creek, Hagerman, and Wendell precincts were derived from the Malad precinct and posted a 509% increase over its 1900 population. Population growth was substantially lower at Bliss which only increased 42% over the 1900 population for the Bliss and Boulder Hill precincts. The only exception to the boom was for the sparsely populated Clover Creek precinct which saw a population decline. Overall, the precincts grew from 852 residents to 4,677 over that time frame—an increase of 448%.

Compared to other Lincoln County settlements of the time, Gooding's growth was mirrored in new settlement at Jerome and Rupert. The Jerome and Gooding precincts overtook the county seat of Shoshone as the most populous precincts at the 1910 census with the Rupert precinct trailing Shoshone by less than 200 residents. Shoshone was familiar with losing its position as county seat after having been established as the county seat of Logan County in 1889, only to lose that status to Bellevue at an election in 1890. The political considerations of Lincoln County's growth led to the creation of Gooding and Minidoka counties in 1913. Gooding County took on its present shape in 1919 after the formation of Jerome County.

== Notable people ==
- Colston Loveland (born 2004), professional American football player. He grew up in Bliss, Idaho, a small community in Gooding County, and attended Gooding High School. Loveland played college football at the University of Michigan, where he was part of the 2023 national championship team. Known for carrying his small-town Idaho roots with pride, he became the highest-drafted tight end of the 2025 NFL draft when he was selected 10th overall by the Chicago Bears.

== Geography ==
According to the U.S. Census Bureau, the county has a total area of 734 square miles (1,900 km^{2}), of which 729 square miles (1,890 km^{2}) is land and 4.7 square miles (12 km^{2}) (0.6%) is water.

=== Adjacent counties ===
- Elmore County - west
- Twin Falls County - south
- Jerome County - east
- Lincoln County - east
- Camas County - north

=== Highways ===
- Interstate 84
- US 26
- US 30
- SH-46

== Demographics ==
Historical population
Census	Pop.	Note	%±
1920	6,427		—
1930	7,419		15.4%
1940	9,544		28.6%
1950	8,730		−8.5%
1960	9,544		9.3%
1970	8,645		−9.4%
1980	11,874		37.4%
1990	11,633		−2.0%
2000	14,155		21.7%
2010	15,464		9.2%
2020	15,598		0.9%
2025 (est.)	16,446	▲	5.4%
U.S. Decennial Census; 1790–1960, 1900–1990, 1990–2000, 2010, 2020

=== Racial and ethnic composition ===
Gooding County, Idaho – Racial and ethnic composition Note: the US Census treats Hispanic/Latino as an ethnic category. This table excludes Latinos from the racial categories and assigns them to a separate category. Hispanics/Latinos may be of any race.
Race / Ethnicity (NH = Non-Hispanic)	Pop 1980	Pop 1990	Pop 2000	Pop 2010	Pop 2020	% 1980	% 1990	% 2000	% 2010	% 2020
White alone (NH)	10,937	10,535	11,373	10,758	10,044	92.11%	90.56%	80.35%	69.57%	64.39%
Black or African American alone (NH)	5	7	8	13	20	0.04%	0.06%	0.06%	0.08%	0.13%
Native American or Alaska Native alone (NH)	76	40	83	86	70	0.64%	0.34%	0.59%	0.56%	0.45%
Asian alone (NH)	22	29	33	60	40	0.19%	0.25%	0.23%	0.39%	0.26%
Native Hawaiian or Pacific Islander alone (NH)	x	x	7	10	4	x	x	0.05%	0.06%	0.03%
Other race alone (NH)	59	1	7	11	52	0.50%	0.01%	0.05%	0.07%	0.33%
Mixed race or Multiracial (NH)	x	x	230	182	521	x	x	1.62%	1.18%	3.34%
Hispanic or Latino (any race)	775	1,021	2,414	4,344	4,847	6.53%	8.78%	17.05%	28.09%	31.07%
Total	11,874	11,633	14,155	15,464	15,598	100.00%	100.00%	100.00%	100.00%	100.00%

=== 2020 census ===
As of the 2020 census, the county had a population of 15,598. The median age was 37.1 years. 27.7% of residents were under the age of 18 and 18.0% of residents were 65 years of age or older. For every 100 females there were 104.8 males, and for every 100 females age 18 and over there were 104.4 males age 18 and over.

The racial makeup of the county was 72.0% White, 0.2% Black or African American, 1.1% American Indian and Alaska Native, 0.3% Asian, 0.0% Native Hawaiian and Pacific Islander, 14.7% from some other race, and 11.7% from two or more races. Hispanic or Latino residents of any race comprised 31.1% of the population.

0.0% of residents lived in urban areas, while 100.0% lived in rural areas.

There were 5,647 households in the county, of which 34.5% had children under the age of 18 living with them and 20.5% had a female householder with no spouse or partner present. About 24.3% of all households were made up of individuals and 12.1% had someone living alone who was 65 years of age or older.

There were 6,030 housing units, of which 6.4% were vacant. Among occupied housing units, 67.0% were owner-occupied and 33.0% were renter-occupied. The homeowner vacancy rate was 0.7% and the rental vacancy rate was 2.8%.

=== 2010 census ===
As of the 2010 United States census, there were 15,464 people, 5,531 households, and 3,927 families living in the county. The population density was 21.2 inhabitants per square mile (8.2/km^{2}). There were 6,093 housing units at an average density of 8.4 units per square mile (3.2 units/km^{2}). The racial makeup of the county was 80.7% white, 0.8% American Indian, 0.5% Asian, 0.2% black or African American, 0.1% Pacific islander, 15.3% from other races, and 2.4% from two or more races. Those of Hispanic or Latino origin made up 28.1% of the population. In terms of ancestry, 14.2% were German, 11.3% were Irish, 11.0% were English, and 5.6% were American.

Of the 5,531 households, 37.4% had children under the age of 18 living with them, 56.4% were married couples living together, 8.8% had a female householder with no husband present, 29.0% were non-families, and 24.2% of all households were made up of individuals. The average household size was 2.79 and the average family size was 3.32. The median age was 34.3 years.

The median income for a household in the county was $37,228 and the median income for a family was $45,369. Males had a median income of $31,752 versus $24,450 for females. The per capita income for the county was $17,694. About 11.1% of families and 16.5% of the population were below the poverty line, including 20.0% of those under age 18 and 19.2% of those age 65 or over.

=== 2000 census ===
As of the census of 2000, there were 14,155 people, 5,046 households, and 3,718 families living in the county. The population density was 19 people per square mile (7.3 people/km^{2}). There were 5,505 housing units at an average density of 8 units per square mile (3.1 units/km^{2}). The racial makeup of the county was 87.59% White, 0.23% Black or African American, 0.84% Native American, 0.23% Asian, 0.06% Pacific Islander, 8.24% from other races, and 2.80% from two or more races. 17.05% of the population were Hispanic or Latino of any race. 15.9% were of English, 13.7% German, 10.9% American and 6.6% Irish ancestry.

There were 5,046 households, out of which 36.10% had children under the age of 18 living with them, 61.90% were married couples living together, 7.60% had a female householder with no husband present, and 26.30% were non-families. 22.00% of all households were made up of individuals, and 11.50% had someone living alone who was 65 years of age or older. The average household size was 2.76 and the average family size was 3.22.

In the county, the population was spread out, with 29.60% under the age of 18, 8.70% from 18 to 24, 25.10% from 25 to 44, 21.20% from 45 to 64, and 15.40% who were 65 years of age or older. The median age was 35 years. For every 100 females there were 104.20 males. For every 100 females age 18 and over, there were 102.00 males.

The median income for a household in the county was $31,888, and the median income for a family was $36,290. Males had a median income of $25,321 versus $17,903 for females. The per capita income for the county was $14,612. About 11.20% of families and 13.80% of the population were below the poverty line, including 18.90% of those under age 18 and 11.30% of those age 65 or over.

=== 2017 ===
As of 2017 the largest self-reported ancestry groups in Gooding County, Idaho were:

- 11.1% were English
- 8.0% were German
- 6.9% were Irish
- 6.6% were American
- 3.0% were Dutch
- 1.5% were Norwegian
- 1.4% were Swedish
- 1.3% were Italian
- 1.3% were Danish
- 0.9% were Greek

== Communities ==
=== Cities ===
- Bliss
- Gooding
- Hagerman
- Wendell

== Politics ==
United States presidential election results for Gooding County, Idaho
Year	Republican		Democratic		Third party(ies)	
Year	No.	%	No.	%	No.	%
1916	1,093	47.58%	1,089	47.41%	115	5.01%
1920	1,878	70.42%	789	29.58%	0	0.00%
1924	1,097	45.42%	422	17.47%	896	37.10%
1928	1,852	68.87%	821	30.53%	16	0.60%
1932	1,451	40.99%	1,911	53.98%	178	5.03%
1936	1,505	40.62%	2,100	56.68%	100	2.70%
1940	2,352	55.02%	1,919	44.89%	4	0.09%
1944	2,049	55.14%	1,659	44.64%	8	0.22%
1948	2,111	52.58%	1,844	45.93%	60	1.49%
1952	3,452	71.03%	1,404	28.89%	4	0.08%
1956	2,835	61.39%	1,783	38.61%	0	0.00%
1960	2,523	55.72%	2,005	44.28%	0	0.00%
1964	2,527	57.76%	1,848	42.24%	0	0.00%
1968	2,349	55.56%	1,018	24.08%	861	20.36%
1972	3,124	70.73%	1,030	23.32%	263	5.95%
1976	2,909	58.54%	1,923	38.70%	137	2.76%
1980	3,897	68.43%	1,481	26.01%	317	5.57%
1984	3,819	74.60%	1,247	24.36%	53	1.04%
1988	2,908	59.64%	1,872	38.39%	96	1.97%
1992	2,178	39.14%	1,530	27.50%	1,856	33.36%
1996	2,637	51.05%	1,503	29.09%	1,026	19.86%
2000	3,502	69.68%	1,282	25.51%	242	4.81%
2004	3,973	74.61%	1,278	24.00%	74	1.39%
2008	3,765	69.84%	1,489	27.62%	137	2.54%
2012	3,696	72.22%	1,287	25.15%	135	2.64%
2016	3,743	72.11%	930	17.92%	518	9.98%
2020	4,659	76.98%	1,256	20.75%	137	2.26%
2024	4,676	78.77%	1,100	18.53%	160	2.70%

== Education ==
School districts include:

- Bliss Joint School District 234
- Buhl Joint School District 412
- Gooding Joint School District 231
- Hagerman Joint School District 233
- Jerome Joint School District 261
- Wendell School District 232

There is also a state government-operated school in Gooding, Idaho School for the Deaf and the Blind.

It is in the catchment area, but not the taxation zone, for College of Southern Idaho.

== See also ==
- National Register of Historic Places listings in Gooding County, Idaho
- County Parcel Map
