= King Hill, Idaho =

Unincorporated community in the state of Idaho, United States

- Unincorporated community
- Location within Idaho Location within the United States
- Coordinates: 43°00′15″N 115°12′14″W
- Country: United States
- State: Idaho
- County: Elmore
- Elevation: 2,536 ft (773 m)
- Time zone: UTC-7 (Mountain (MST))
  - Summer (DST): UTC-6 (MDT)
- ZIP code: 83633
- Area codes: 208, 986
- GNIS feature ID: 396744

King Hill is an unincorporated community in Elmore County, Idaho, United States. King Hill is located on the Snake River 6 miles (9.7 km) northeast of Glenns Ferry. King Hill has a post office with ZIP code 83633.

The biochemist Clinton Ballou was born in King Hill in 1923.

== History ==
King Hill's population was estimated at 200 in 1960.
