= Mayfield, Idaho =

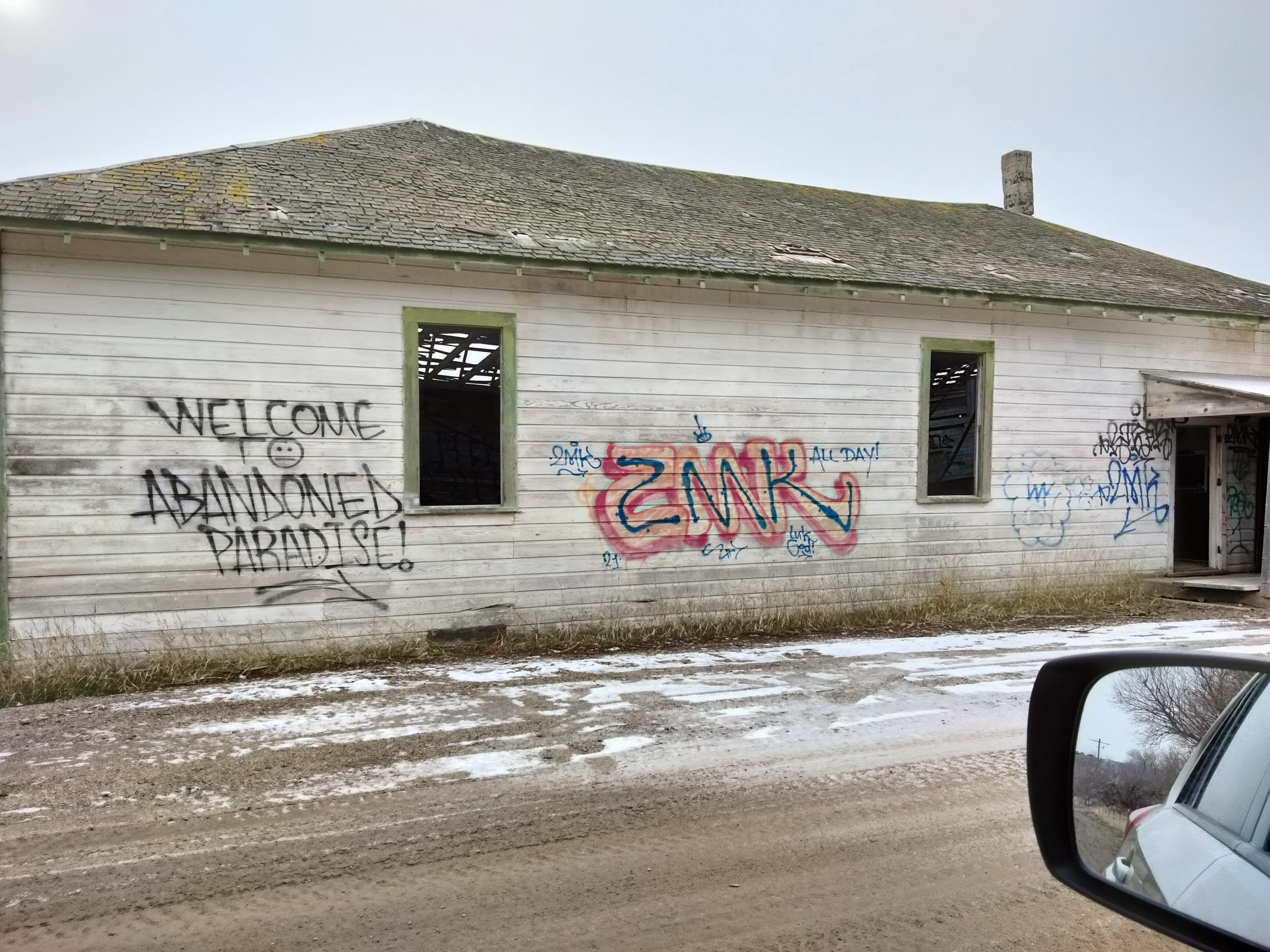
"Welcome to Abandoned Paradise!" graffitio on the main razed building

Mayfield, Idaho is a former ghost town 20.8 miles (33.5 km) southeast of Boise, Idaho and 6.1 miles (9.8 km) northeast of I-84's Exit 71. One of the numerous ephemeral settlements along the old Oregon Trail, it is now a slated planned community of some 5000 homes. Initial ambitious plans for an unincorporated townsite of 15,000 homesites were controversial due to concerns over the resources required, particularly water, the environment impact on the rangeland, and the sociological changes such a large settlement in an area of low population density would bring.
