= Notus, Idaho =

- City
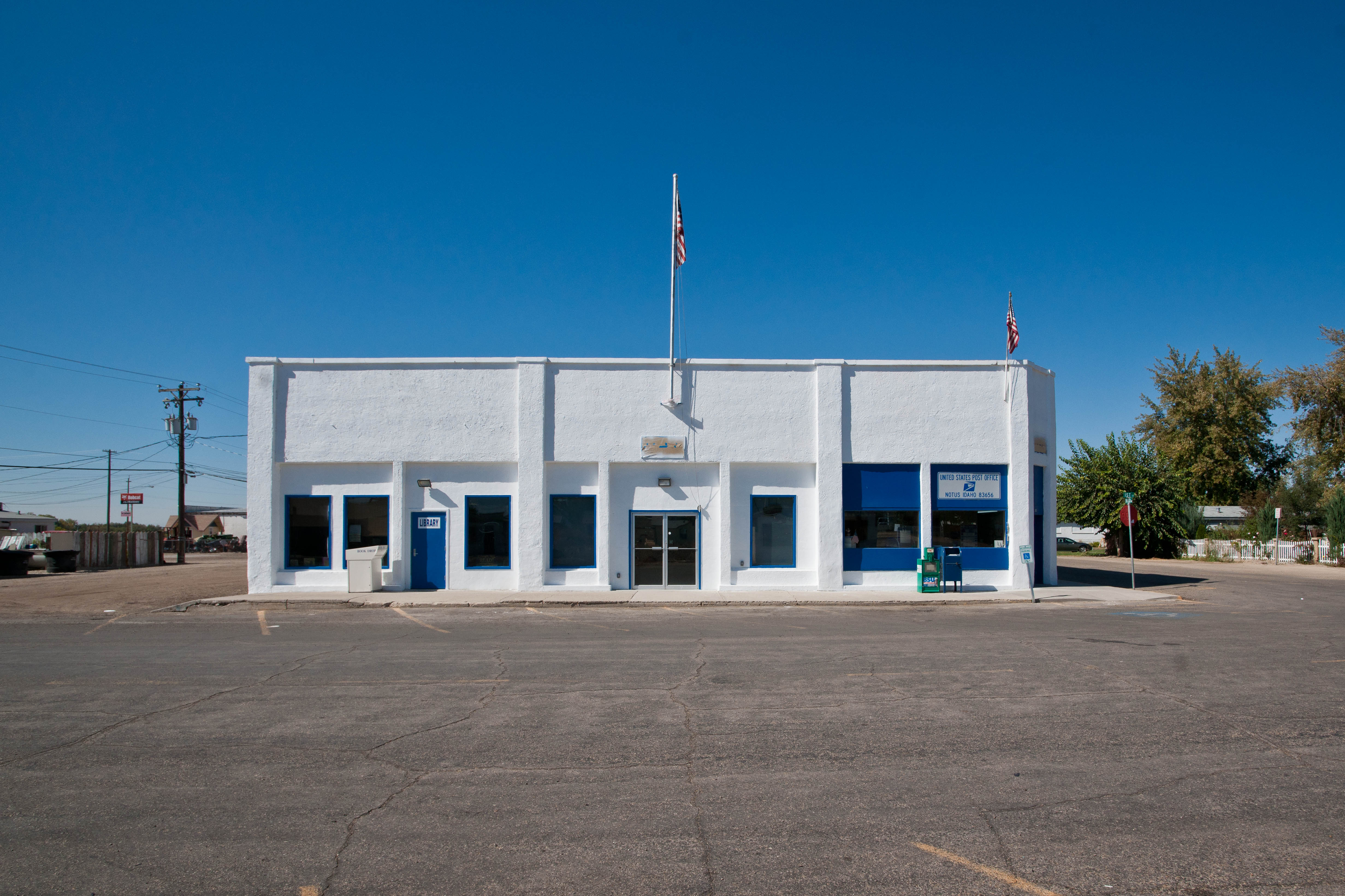
- U.S. Post office in Notus, Idaho

- Location of Notus in Canyon County, Idaho.
- Coordinates: 43°43′36″N 116°48′00″W
- Country: United States
- State: Idaho
- County: Canyon

Area
  - Total: 0.38 sq mi (0.99 km^{2})
  - Land: 0.37 sq mi (0.95 km^{2})
  - Water: 0.012 sq mi (0.03 km^{2})
- Elevation: 2,323 ft (708 m)

Population (2020)
  - Total: 609
  - Density: 1,700/sq mi (640/km^{2})
- Time zone: UTC-7 (Mountain (MST))
  - Summer (DST): UTC-6 (MDT)
- ZIP code: 83656
- Area code: 208
- FIPS code: 16-58060
- GNIS feature ID: 2411282
- Website: notusidaho.org/index.html

Historical population
Census	Pop.	Note	%±
1930	144		—
1940	277		92.4%
1950	313		13.0%
1960	324		3.5%
1970	304		−6.2%
1980	437		43.8%
1990	380		−13.0%
2000	458		20.5%
2010	531		15.9%
2020	609		14.7%
U.S. Decennial Census

Notus is a small rural city in Canyon County, Idaho. The population was 609 at the time of the 2020 census. It is part of the Boise metropolitan area.

== History ==
The present day location of the City of Notus is located along Highway 20/26.

In 1874, the Lower Boise Post Office was established on the homestead of C.L.F Peterson. The inclusion of the Lower Boise Post Office is considered to be the primary reason for the present location of Notus. According to an Idaho Press Tribune article from 1986, Notus got its name from the daughter of a local railroad official. The daughter reportedly thought "notus" was of Native American origin and meant "it's all right." The town of Notus was almost known as 'Lemp'.

In 1926, the Notus secondary school was founded. In 2017, the old building was demolished.

== Geography ==
According to the United States Census Bureau, the city has a total area of 0.39 square miles (1.01 km^{2}), of which, 0.38 square miles (0.98 km^{2}) is land and 0.01 square miles (0.03 km^{2}) is water.

== Features ==
Notus has one secondary school and one elementary school. Notus also has a city park, a museum located along highway 20/26, a public library, and one restaurant.

== Demographics ==
=== 2010 census ===
As of the census of 2010, there were 531 people, 182 households, and 139 families residing in the city. The population density was 1,397.4 inhabitants per square mile (539.5/km^{2}). There were 198 housing units at an average density of 521.1 per square mile (201.2/km^{2}). The racial makeup of the city was 73.3% White, 0.2% African American, 2.4% Native American, 0.4% Asian, 18.5% from other races, and 5.3% from two or more races. Hispanic or Latino of any race were 29.8% of the population.

There were 182 households, of which 41.2% had children under the age of 18 living with them, 61.5% were married couples living together, 9.3% had a female householder with no husband present, 5.5% had a male householder with no wife present, and 23.6% were non-families. 18.1% of all households were made up of individuals, and 9.3% had someone living alone who was 65 years of age or older. The average household size was 2.92 and the average family size was 3.34.

The median age in the city was 35.5 years. 31.1% of residents were under the age of 18; 6.9% were between the ages of 18 and 24; 25% were from 25 to 44; 25.4% were from 45 to 64; and 11.7% were 65 years of age or older. The gender makeup of the city was 47.1% male and 52.9% female.

=== 2000 census ===
As of the census of 2000, there were 458 people, 147 households, and 113 families residing in the city. The population density was 1,160.7 inhabitants per square mile (448.1/km^{2}). There were 156 housing units at an average density of 395.4 per square mile (152.7/km^{2}). The racial makeup of the city was 86.90% White, 1.31% Native American, 0.66% Asian, 8.73% from other races, and 2.40% from two or more races. Hispanic or Latino of any race were 22.05% of the population.

There were 147 households, out of which 44.9% had children under the age of 18 living with them, 64.6% were married couples living together, 6.8% had a female householder with no husband present, and 23.1% were non-families. 18.4% of all households were made up of individuals, and 5.4% had someone living alone who was 65 years of age or older. The average household size was 3.12 and the average family size was 3.58.

In the city, the population was spread out, with 33.4% under the age of 18, 7.6% from 18 to 24, 27.7% from 25 to 44, 20.1% from 45 to 64, and 11.1% who were 65 years of age or older. The median age was 31 years. For every 100 females, there were 100.0 males. For every 100 females age 18 and over, there were 93.0 males.

The median income for a household in the city was $32,813, and the median income for a family was $43,750. Males had a median income of $25,000 versus $21,250 for females. The per capita income for the city was $11,801. About 10.4% of families and 13.3% of the population were below the poverty line, including 11.2% of those under age 18 and 28.3% of those age 65 or over.

== Education ==
It is in the Notus School District 135.

Residents of Canyon County are in the area (and the taxation zone) for College of Western Idaho.

== Notable person ==
- Chris Horn, former NFL wide receiver
