= Wendell, Idaho =

- City
- Location of Wendell in Gooding County, Idaho.
- Coordinates: 42°46′28″N 114°42′09″W
- Country: United States
- State: Idaho
- County: Gooding

Area
  - Total: 1.41 sq mi (3.65 km^{2})
  - Land: 1.41 sq mi (3.64 km^{2})
- Elevation: 3,435 ft (1,047 m)

Population (2020)
  - Total: 2,917
  - Density: 2,080/sq mi (801/km^{2})
- Time zone: UTC-7 (Mountain (MST))
  - Summer (DST): UTC-6 (MDT)
- ZIP code: 83355
- Area code: 208
- FIPS code: 16-86320
- GNIS feature ID: 2412213
- Website: wendell.id.gov

Wendell is a city in southern Gooding County, Idaho, United States. The population was 2,917 at the 2020 census.

== Geography ==
According to the United States Census Bureau, the city has a total area of 1.36 square miles (3.52 km^{2}), all of it land.

== Demographics ==
Historical population
Census	Pop.	Note	%±
1910	482		—
1920	664		37.8%
1930	725		9.2%
1940	1,001		38.1%
1950	1,483		48.2%
1960	1,232		−16.9%
1970	1,122		−8.9%
1980	1,974		75.9%
1990	1,963		−0.6%
2000	2,338		19.1%
2010	2,782		19.0%
2020	2,917		4.9%
U.S. Decennial Census

=== 2020 census ===
As of the 2020 census, Wendell had a population of 2,917. The median age was 33.0 years. 30.0% of residents were under the age of 18 and 15.3% of residents were 65 years of age or older. For every 100 females, there were 103.4 males, and for every 100 females age 18 and over, there were 96.7 males.

0.0% of residents lived in urban areas, while 100.0% lived in rural areas.

There were 1,009 households, of which 41.0% had children under the age of 18 living in them. Of all households, 50.1% were married-couple households, 17.0% were households with a male householder and no spouse or partner present, and 27.0% were households with a female householder and no spouse or partner present. About 23.5% of all households were made up of individuals, and 11.5% had someone living alone who was 65 years of age or older.

There were 1,052 housing units, of which 4.1% were vacant. The homeowner vacancy rate was 1.1%, and the rental vacancy rate was 5.4%.

Racial composition as of the 2020 census
Race	Number	Percent
White	1,839	63.0%
Black or African American	6	0.2%
American Indian and Alaska Native	38	1.3%
Asian	5	0.2%
Native Hawaiian and Other Pacific Islander	1	0.0%
Some other race	626	21.5%
Two or more races	402	13.8%
Hispanic or Latino (of any race)	1,303	44.7%

=== 2010 census ===
As of the census of 2010, there were 2,782 people, 978 households, and 695 families residing in the city. The population density was 2,045.6 inhabitants per square mile (789.8/km^{2}). There were 1,054 housing units at an average density of 775.0 per square mile (299.2/km^{2}). The racial makeup of the city was 74.2% White, 0.2% African American, 1.4% Native American, 0.3% Asian, 0.2% Pacific Islander, 21.9% from other races, and 2.0% from two or more races. Hispanic or Latino of any race were 35.7% of the population.

There were 978 households, of which 40.7% had children under the age of 18 living with them, 53.6% were married couples living together, 10.8% had a female householder with no husband present, 6.6% had a male householder with no wife present, and 28.9% were non-families. 24.7% of all households were made up of individuals, and 14.4% had someone living alone who was 65 years of age or older. The average household size was 2.83 and the average family size was 3.37.

The median age in the city was 31.9 years. 30.6% of residents were under the age of 18; 10.2% were between the ages of 18 and 24; 25.5% were from 25 to 44; 19.7% were from 45 to 64; and 14.2% were 65 years of age or older. The gender makeup of the city was 51.1% male and 48.9% female.

=== 2000 census ===
As of the census of 2000, there were 2,338 people, 835 households, and 613 families residing in the city. The population density was 2,072.8 inhabitants per square mile (800.3/km^{2}). There were 887 housing units at an average density of 786.4 per square mile (303.6/km^{2}). The racial makeup of the city was 88.92% White, 0.04% African American, 0.47% Native American, 0.21% Asian, 0.13% Pacific Islander, 7.78% from other races, and 2.44% from two or more races. Hispanic or Latino of any race were 17.54% of the population.

There were 835 households, out of which 36.8% had children under the age of 18 living with them, 58.1% were married couples living together, 12.1% had a female householder with no husband present, and 26.5% were non-families. 22.2% of all households were made up of individuals, and 10.3% had someone living alone who was 65 years of age or older. The average household size was 2.76 and the average family size was 3.23.

In the city, the population was spread out, with 30.7% under the age of 18, 9.6% from 18 to 24, 23.7% from 25 to 44, 19.5% from 45 to 64, and 16.5% who were 65 years of age or older. The median age was 33 years. For every 100 females, there were 92.1 males. For every 100 females age 18 and over, there were 91.2 males.

The median income for a household in the city was $29,390, and the median income for a family was $32,377. Males had a median income of $23,750 versus $14,375 for females. The per capita income for the city was $14,169. About 11.7% of families and 13.1% of the population were below the poverty line, including 19.9% of those under age 18 and 9.7% of those age 65 or over.

== Education ==
It is in Wendell School District 232. The Wendell School System includes an elementary school, a middle school, and Wendell High School. Its sports teams are nicknamed the Trojans. In 2005, Wendell Middle School was awarded the Idaho Education Award by the State of Idaho.

Gooding County is in the catchment area, but not the taxation zone, for College of Southern Idaho.

== Notable people ==
- James F. Amos, 35th Commandant of the Marine Corps
- Sherry Jackson, actress

== See also ==
- List of cities in Idaho
