= Idaho Transportation Department =

State transportation department in Idaho, United States

Idaho Transportation Department (ITD)

Agency overview
- Formed: 1974; 52 years ago
- Preceding agencies: Idaho Highway Commission; Idaho Department of Highways
- Jurisdiction: State of Idaho
- Headquarters: 3311 West State Street; Boise, Idaho
- Agency executives: Scott Stokes, Director; Dan McElhinney, Chief Deputy Director / Chief Operations Officer; Mollie McCarty, Chief External Affairs Officer; Brenda Williams, Chief Human Resources Officer; Dave Tolman, Chief Administrative Officer
- Parent agency: State of Idaho
- Website: itd.idaho.gov

The Idaho Transportation Department (ITD) is the state of Idaho governmental organization responsible for state transportation infrastructure. This includes ongoing operations and maintenance as well as planning for future needs of the state and its citizens. The agency is responsible for overseeing the disbursement of federal, state, and grant funding for transportation programs in the state.

== Overview ==
Idaho's state transportation system consists of more than 12,200 miles (19,600 km) (lane miles) of roads, more than 1,800 bridges, approximately 1,630 miles (2,620 km) of rail lines, 126 public-use airports, and the Port of Lewiston.

The agency is also responsible for 29 rest areas and 12 ports of entry.

== History ==
The Idaho Legislature created the State Highway Commission 113 years ago in 1913. The group consisted of the Secretary of State, the State Engineer and three other members to be appointed by the governor. The Commission was empowered to:

- plan, build and maintain new state highways
- alter, improve or discontinue any state highway
- purchase, condemn, or otherwise obtain necessary easements
- have general supervision of all highways within the state
- expend the fund created for the construction, maintenance and improvement of state highways
- maintain and improve state highways
- make and enforce rules
- employ a Chief Engineer and assistants
- supervise registration of vehicles
- keep a complete record of all activities and expenses

In 1919, the Commission was abolished and its functions were transferred to a Bureau of Highways in the Department of Public Works. A property tax was enacted by the Legislature to fund roads for the state and bonds were issued to build a highway system.

In 1950, the Idaho Department of Highways was reorganized and placed under the direction of a governing Board. In 1974, the Idaho Department of Highways became the Idaho Transportation Department. The Department of Motor Vehicles originally reported to the Idaho Department of Law Enforcement, but was transferred to ITD in 1982.

== Organization ==
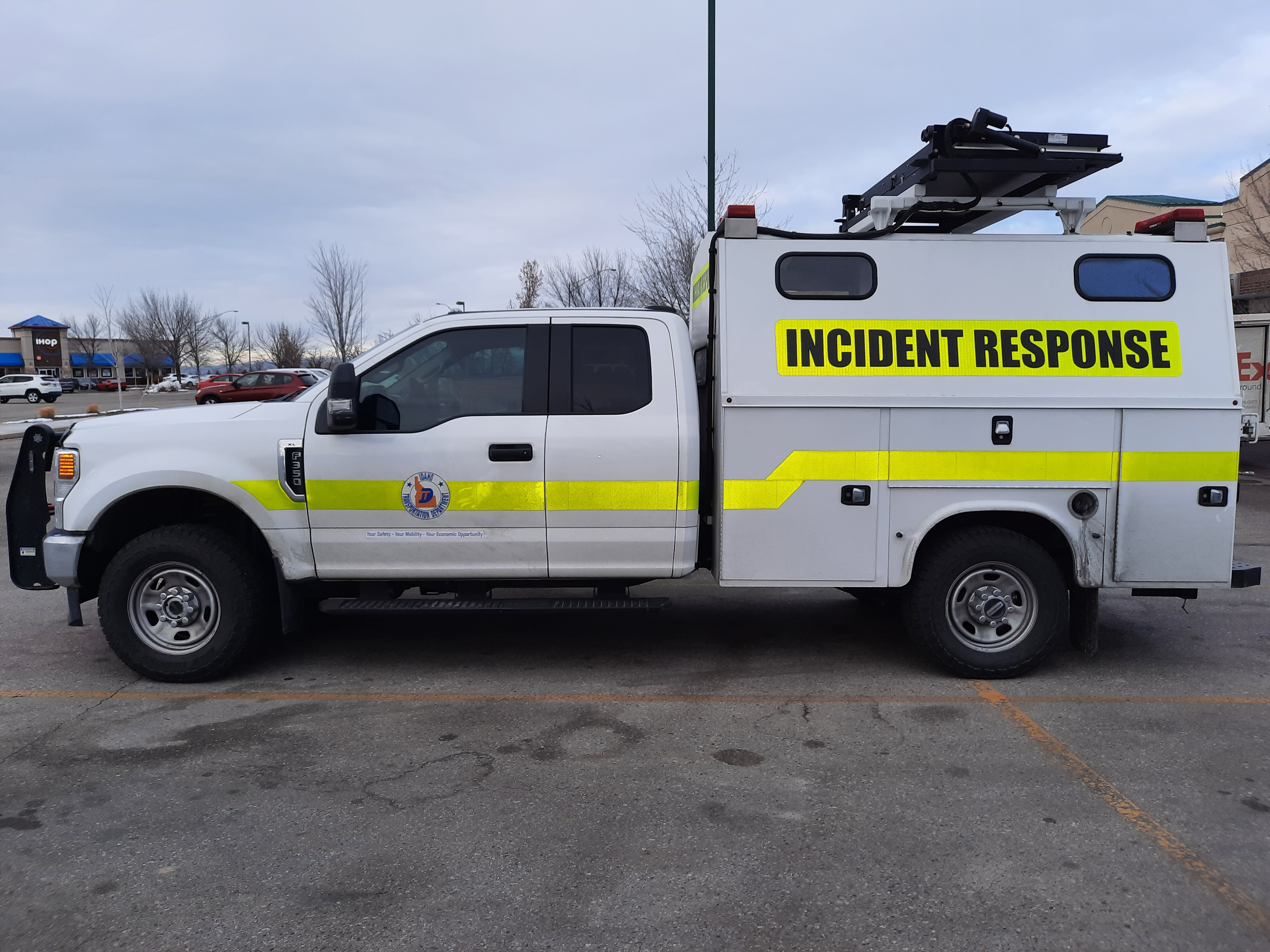
Incident Response vehicle

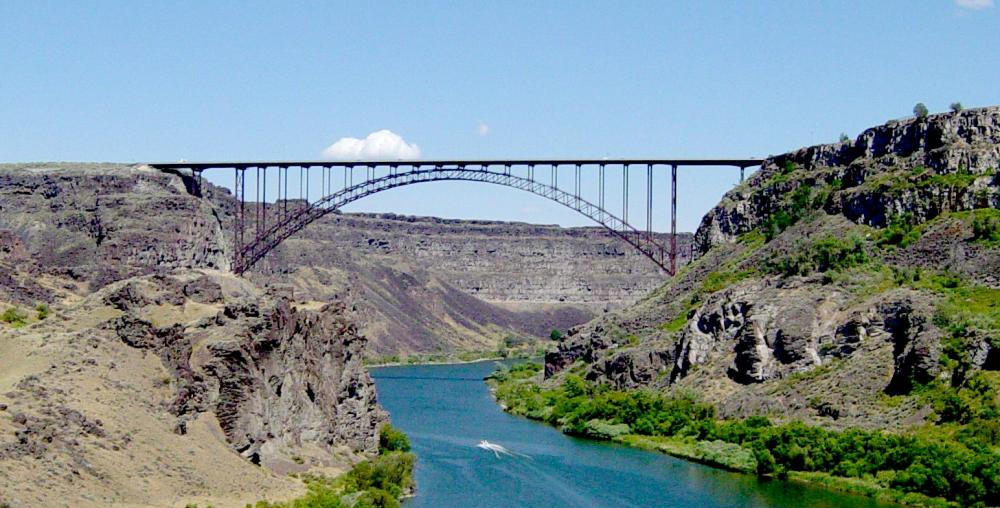
Perrine Bridge on Hwy 93 over the Snake River

ITD is organized into five divisions and six district offices. The agency serves under an appointed seven member Idaho Transportation Board. The board establishes state transportation policy and guides the planning, development and management of the Idaho transportation network. The board is appointed by the governor. One board member represents each of the six regional districts. A seventh member is appointed as chairman of the board.

The department has the following six divisions:

- Administration
- Aeronautics
- Highways
- Human Resources
- Motor Vehicles

== District offices ==
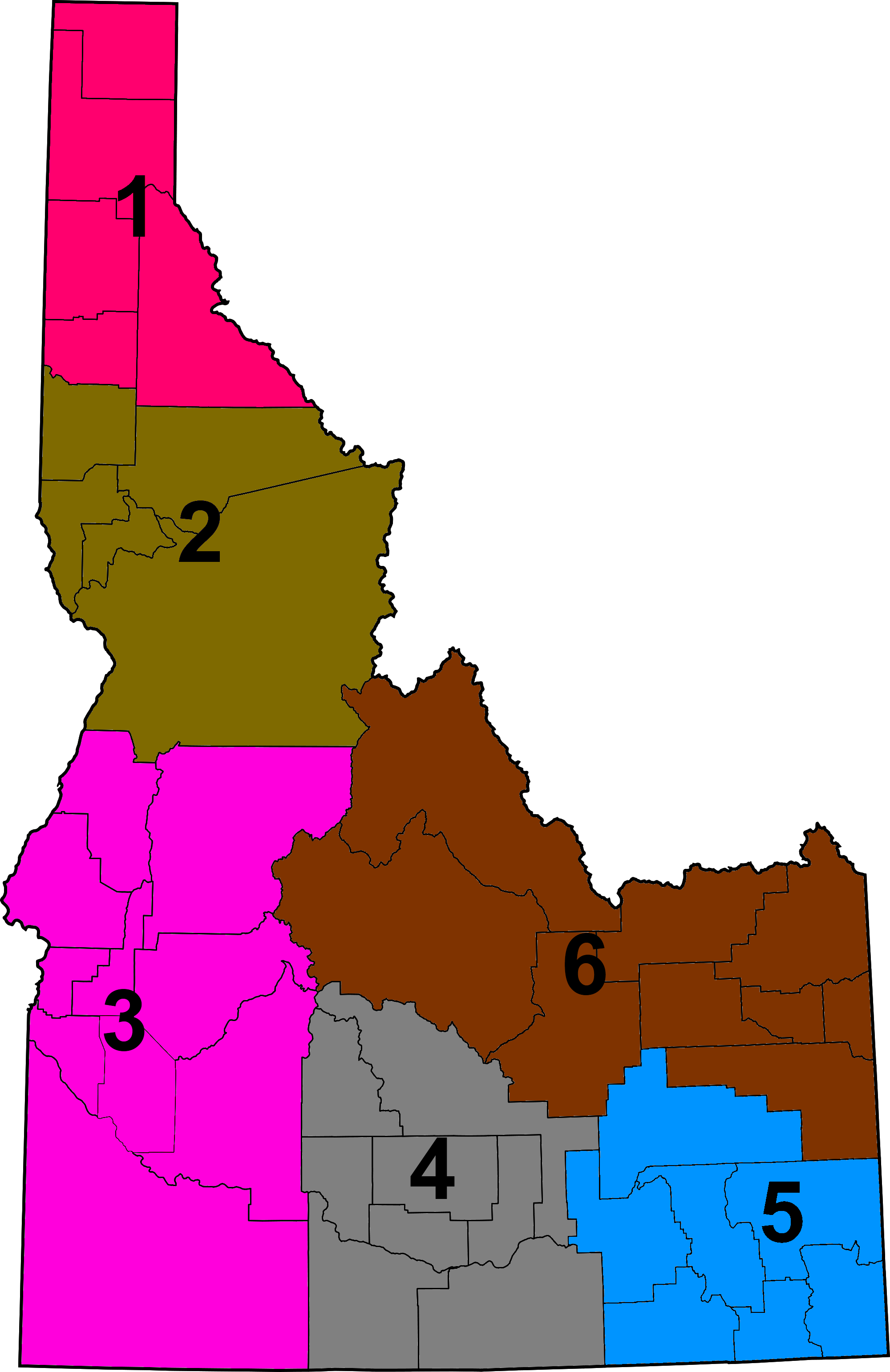
District map

- District 1: Benewah, Bonner, Boundary, Kootenai, and Shoshone counties. Headquartered in Coeur d'Alene.
- District 2: Clearwater, Idaho, Latah, Lewis, and Nez Perce counties. Headquartered in Lewiston.
- District 3: Ada, Adams, Boise, Canyon, Elmore, Gem, Owyhee, Payette, Valley, and Washington counties. Headquartered in Boise.
- District 4: Blaine, Camas, Cassia, Gooding, Jerome, Lincoln, Minidoka, and Twin Falls counties. Headquartered in Shoshone.
- District 5: Bannock, Bear Lake, Bingham, Caribou, Franklin, Oneida, and Power counties. Headquartered in Pocatello.
- District 6: Bonneville, Butte, Clark, Custer, Fremont, Jefferson, Lemhi, Madison, and Teton counties. Headquartered in Rigby.

== See also ==
- List of state highways in Idaho
- Outline of Idaho
- U.S. Department of Transportation
- Vehicle registration plates of Idaho
