= Minidoka =

Minidoka is a name of Dakota Sioux origin meaning "a fountain or spring of water". It is a name shared by several geographic locations in the Magic Valley region of southern Idaho in the United States:

- Minidoka, Idaho, a town in Minidoka County
- Minidoka County, Idaho
- Minidoka Dam, located north of Acequia, Idaho
- Minico High School (also known as Minidoka County High School), near Rupert, Idaho
- Minidoka National Forest, a former U.S. national forest
- Minidoka National Historic Site, an American concentration camp where Japanese Americans were imprisoned during World War II
- Minidoka Project, an irrigation project
- Minidoka Ranger District, a district of Sawtooth National Forest
- Minidoka: 937th Earl of One Mile Series M, an Edgar Rice Burroughs novella first published in 1998
