= Project Mutual Telephone =

Telephone company serving Idaho, USA

Logo of Project Mutual Telephone

Project Mutual Telephone Company (PMT) is an American telecommunications and broadband company based in South Central Idaho. Founded in 1916 as a rural co-op, it was formerly known as the Project Mutual Telephone Cooperative Association.

== History ==
Project Mutual has provided continuous telephone service in the Minidoka and Cassia area of Idaho since 1916, when it started with 34 customers. In 1956, PMT introduced a local direct dial telephone system to its 1,700 customers, adding direct dial long distance services six years later.

In the 1970s and 1980s, PMT continued to introduce new technologies, including the first digital central office in Idaho; fiber optic cable; and a completely digital network.

In 1994, the Project Mutual started offering direct broadcast satellite (DBS) services. When it started offering Internet service, it was able to target a broader subscriber base, expanding into Burley, Oakley, and Heyburn. Because the technology was still new to consumers, PMT gave numerous presentations about the Internet to chambers of commerce and community groups across the region, helping to build awareness for its services. In 2004, PMT extended its network to Twin Falls.

== Current services ==
More than a century since it was first founded, PMT has expanded into offer services including local and long-distance telephone service; high-speed DSL and wireless Internet; and cable television and IPTV.
