= Minico High School =

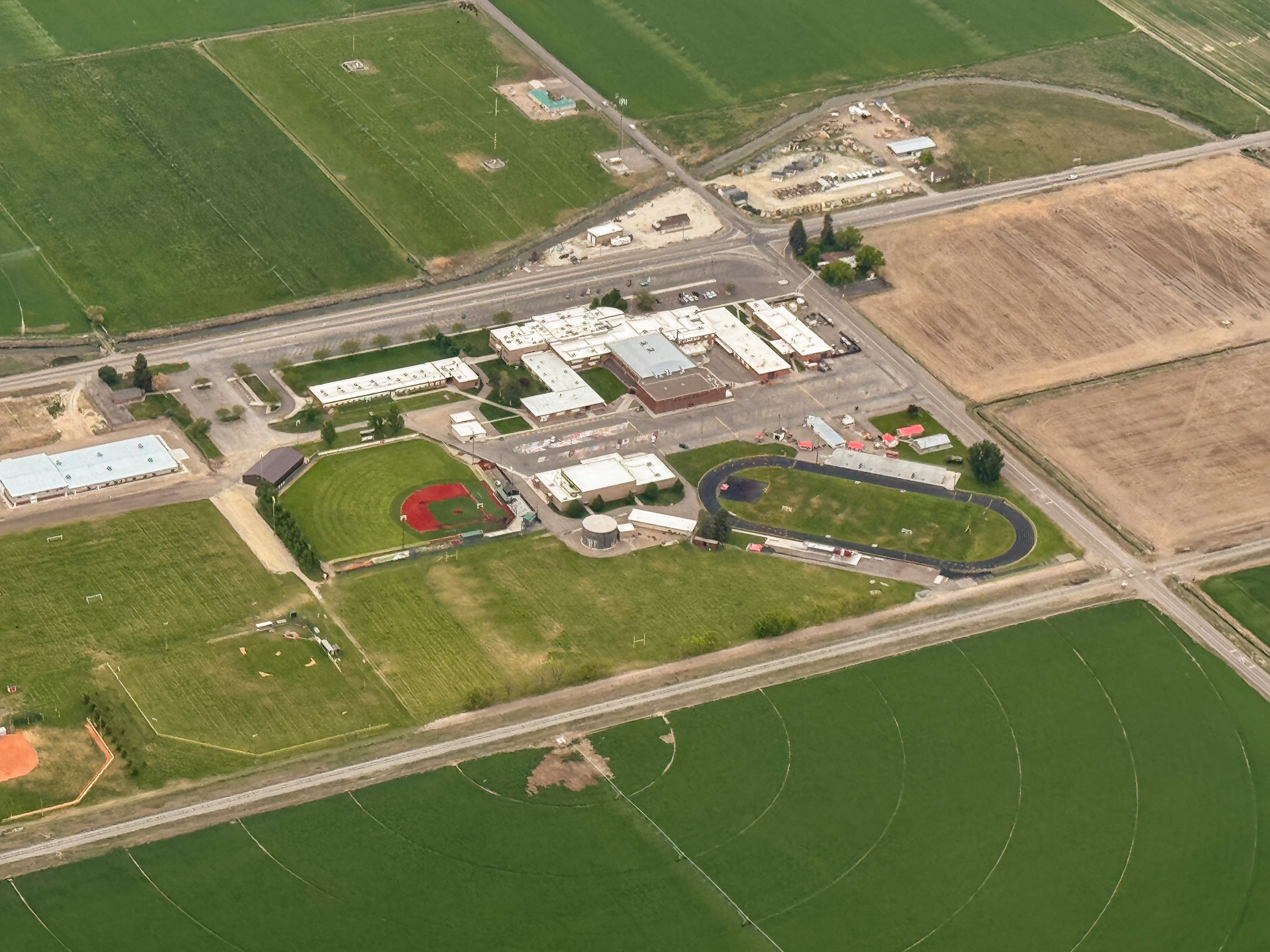

Location
- 292 West 100 South; Rupert address, Idaho; United States; 42°36′18″N 113°43′23″W

Information
- Type: Public
- Established: 1955, 71 years ago
- School district: Minidoka County; J.S.D. #331
- Principal: Kimberly Kidd
- Teaching staff: 66.64 (FTE)
- Grades: 9–12
- Enrollment: 1,206 (2023–2024)
- Student to teacher ratio: 18.10
- Colors: Red & Gold
- Athletics: IHSAA Class 4A
- Athletics conference: Great Basin (West)
- Mascot: Spartan
- Newspaper: Spartan Chronicle
- Yearbook: Sparta
- Feeder schools: East Minico Middle; West Minico Middle
- Elevation: 4,150 ft (1,265 m) AMSL
- Website: Minico High School

Location in the United States
Location in Idaho

Minico High School, also known as Minidoka County High School, is a four-year public secondary school in unincorporated Minidoka County, Idaho, with a Rupert postal address, operated by the Minidoka County Joint School District #331. The school colors are red and gold and the mascot is a Spartan.

== History ==
Minico High School opened in 1955, consolidating four high schools: Rupert, Paul, Heyburn, and Acequia. Towns in the MHS jurisdiction include: Acequia, Burley (Minidoka Co. portion), Heyburn, Jackson (Minidoka Co. portion just east of Rupert), Minidoka, Paul, and Rupert. The campus is located on State Highway 25 (West 100 South) between the cities of Rupert and Paul, just west of the Rupert Country Club.

The name Minico is a contraction of "Minidoka County." The only traditional high school in the county, its jurisdiction includes the entire county, as well as portions of three other counties: the very northeastern part of Lincoln County, near Kimama; a portion of Jerome County; and a portion of Cassia County. Additionally, it includes the rural Yale area in the panhandle of southeastern Blaine County. The Blaine district pays money to the Minidoka district to send the Yale students to Minidoka schools.

MHS is fed by two middle schools: East Minico in Rupert and West Minico in Paul.

The elevation of the campus is 4,150 feet (1,265 m) above sea level.

== Activities ==
Minico offers a variety of clubs and student oriented programs including: Key Club, Leo Club, Student Body/Council Government, Business Club, Young Republicans, Young Democrats, French Club, Spanish Club, FCCLA, Speech Arts Club, Ski Club, Mountain Bike Club, and FFA. Minico also features a cheerleading squad and the Spartan Dance Force. The school's student newspaper is The Spartan Chronicle. Minico also offers three music organizations: band, choir and orchestra.

== Athletics ==
Minico competes in athletics in IHSAA Class 4A and is a member of the Great Basin (West) Conference with Burley, Jerome, and Wood River, all located in the Magic Valley region of Idaho. In August 2009, the conference added Twin Falls and just-opened Canyon Ridge, both located in Twin Falls.

Minico has many varsity sports including boys and girls basketball, boys and girls soccer, tennis, golf, cross country, bowling, wrestling, track and field, volleyball, football, baseball, and softball.

Minico teams have had recent success in several sports. Spartan wrestlers won 4A state championships in several weight classes in 2006 and took the team title. MHS had previously won the state title in 1962 (one class) and 1969 (large school).

The Spartan baseball team has recently been a power at the state level, with 4A state titles in 2005 and 2009 and was runner-up in 2007, losing the final 10–9 to Columbia of Nampa. It was the third time the Spartans were one run short in the state championship game. The 1982 team rallied to win the A-1 (now 5A) state title 7–4 over Lewiston, returning to the final after an 11–10 loss to Borah of Boise the previous year. The 2000 team made the A-1 final, but fell 4–3 to Timberline of Boise in 11 innings. Baseball coach Ben Frank's teaching position (biology) at MHS was one of 19 eliminated in budget cuts by the school district in 2012. In ten seasons as head coach (2003–12), he had a 221–76 (.744) record, with seven 4A state tournament trophies, including two state titles (2005, 2009).

The 2007 football team went undefeated (8–0) in the regular season and won the Great Basin (West) conference. The Spartans defeated Rigby 49–19 in a playoff to qualify for the 4A state tournament, but lost by three points in the quarter-finals to Blackfoot, the eventual champions.

Minico's main predecessor, Rupert High School, won three state titles: one in basketball (1925) and two in track (1924, 1947).

=== State titles ===
Boys

- Basketball (1): 1925 (as Rupert H.S.)
- Wrestling (4): 1962, 1969 (co-), 1970; (4A) 2006
- Baseball (3): (A-1, now 5A) 1982; (4A) 2005, 2009 (records not kept by IHSAA, A-1 state tourney introduced in 1971, A-2 in 1980)
- Track (2): 1924, 1947 (as Rupert H.S.)

Girls

- Cross Country (1): fall (A, now 5A) 1992 (introduced in 1974)

== Notable alumni ==
- Lou Dobbs - journalist, television & radio host - class of 1963
- Jim Boatwright - American-Israeli basketball player; won two Euroleague championships with Israel's Maccabi Tel Aviv - class of 1970
- Bill Fagerbakke - actor, voice actor - class of 1975
- Dan Barrera - mixed martial artist - class of 1999
- Shane Reti - New Zealand physician, member of Parliament and former minister of health under the Sixth National Government of New Zealand from 2023 to January 2025.
