= Empire School =

Empire School may refer to:

- Empire School (Rupert, Idaho), listed on the National Register of Historic Places in Minidoka County, Idaho
- Empire School (Empire, Michigan), listed on the National Register of Historic Places in Leelanau County, Michigan
