= Idaho State Highway 24 =

State highway in Idaho, United States

State Highway 24
- SH-24 highlighted in red

Route information
- Maintained by ITD
- Length: 67.533 mi (108.684 km)

Major junctions
- East end: I-84 near Rupert, ID
- SH-25 in Rupert
- West end: US 93 at Shoshone, ID

Location
- Country: United States
- State: Idaho
- Counties: Minidoka, Lincoln

Highway system
- Idaho State Highway System; Interstate; US; State
← SH-22	→ SH-25

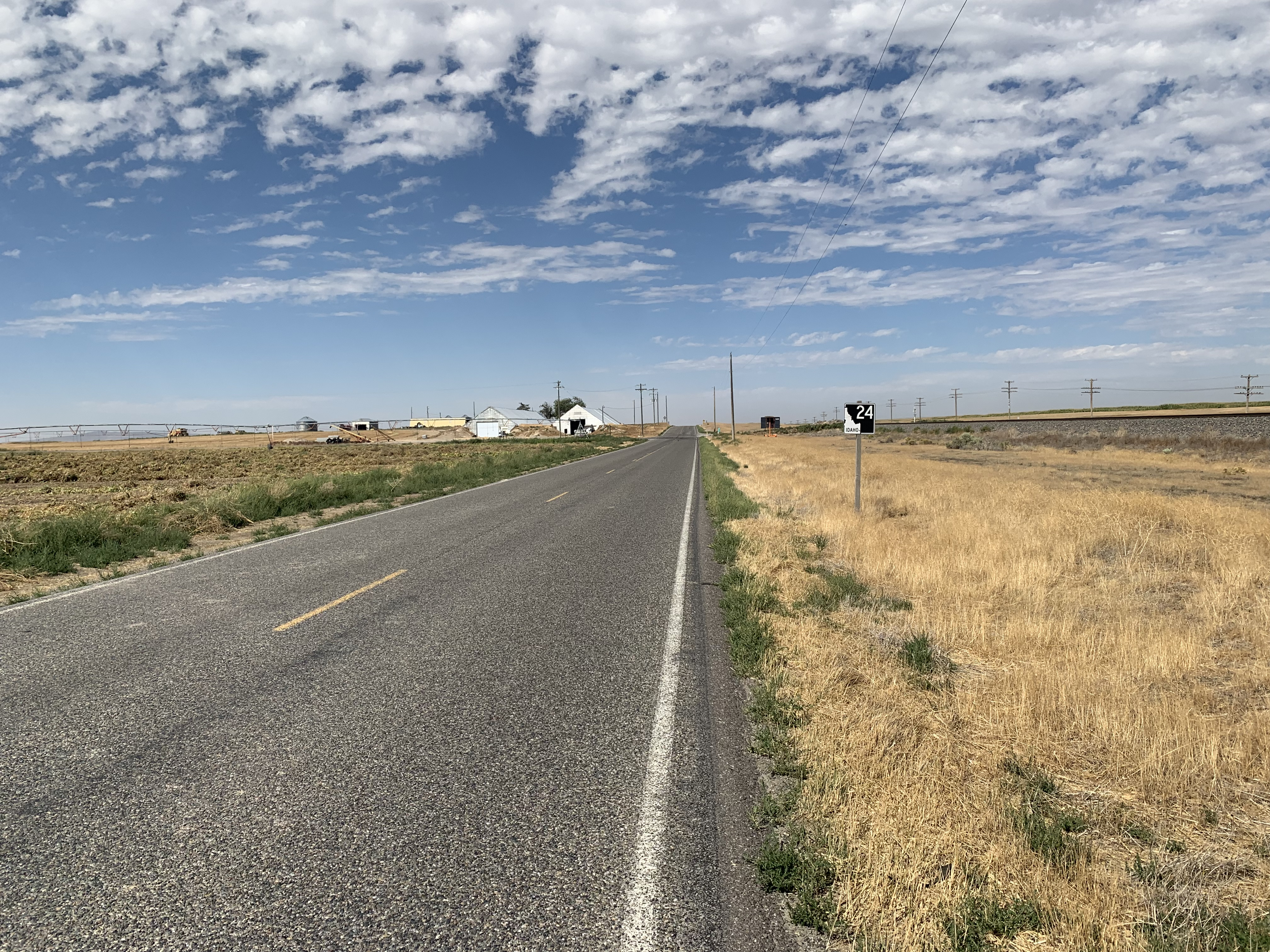
Idaho State Highway 24 heading northwest in Minidoka County, Idaho

State Highway 24 (SH-24) is a 67.5 mi (108.6 km) long state highway in Idaho that runs east west from Shoshone, Idaho on the far west to Minidoka and Acequia on the far east.

== Route description ==
SH-24 begins at I-84 near Rupert. It passes Dietrich, Owinza, and Kimama and runs approximately 20 miles (32 km) north of Paul and Burley and 15 miles north of Rupert. The highway ends at U.S. Highway 93 in Shoshone. It also runs parallel to U.S. Highway 30 and Interstate 84 20 miles (32 km) south, and is parallel to a major Union Pacific railroad line as well.

== Junction list ==
County	Location	mi	km	Destinations	Notes
Minidoka		0.000	0.000	I-84	
Minidoka	Rupert	3.549	5.712	SH-25	
Minidoka	Rupert	3.735 51.068	6.011 82.186	Old SH-25	
Minidoka	Rupert	52.455 5.120	84.418 8.240	SH-25	
Lincoln		67.533	108.684	US 93	
1.000 mi = 1.609 km; 1.000 km = 0.621 mi: Concurrency terminus

== See also ==
- List of state highways in Idaho
- List of highways numbered 24
