= Rupert High School =

Defunct high school in Idaho, United States

Rupert High School was a public high school in Rupert, Idaho, United States. It was the first all electric public building in the United States, allowing it to be the first high school to offer technical programs like home economics (domestic science) and wood shop (the manual training department).

It served students from 1913 until the consolidation of Minidoka County high schools into Minico High School in 1956.

== Notable alumni ==
- Rep. Bert Stevenson, Idaho Legislature member
