= Bert Stevenson =

American politician (born 1936)

Member of the Idaho House of Representatives
- In office 1996 – November 30, 2012
- Preceded by: Steve Antone
- Succeeded by: Steve Miller (redistricting)
- Constituency: 24th district Seat A (1996–2002); 26th district Seat A (2002–2012)

Personal details
- Born: February 9, 1936 (age 90) Acequia, Idaho
- Party: Republican
- Education: Ricks College
- Profession: Farmer

Military service
- Branch/service: United States Army
- Years of service: 1959–1961
- Rank: Specialist

John Albert 'Bert' Stevenson (born February 9, 1936, in Acequia, Idaho) was a Republican Idaho State Representative from 1996 to 2012 representing District 26 in the A seat from 2002 to 2012 and District 24 Seat A from 1996 to 2002.

== Education ==
Stevenson graduated Rupert High School (before its consolidation into Minico High School), and attended Ricks College.

== Elections ==
- 1996 When Republican Representative Steve Antone left the District 24 A seat open, Stevenson won the May 28, 1996, Republican primary with 2,529 votes (66%) against Harold Mohlman, and was unopposed for the November 5, 1996, general election, winning with 8,463 votes.
- 1998 Unopposed for the May 26, 1998, Republican primary, Stevenson won with 3,487 votes, and was unopposed for the November 3, 1998, general election, winning with 6,886 votes.
- 2000 Unopposed for the May 23, 2000, Republican primary, Stevenson won with 3,172 votes, and won the November 7, 2000, general election with 7,309 votes (76.4%) against Peter Snyder (D).
- 2002 Redistricted to District 26, and with Representative JoAn Wood re-districted to District 35, Stevenson was unopposed for the May 28, 2002, Republican primary, winning with 2,956 votes, and was unopposed for the November 5, 2002, general election, winning with 8,498 votes.
- 2004 Unopposed for the May 25, 2004, Republican primary, Stevenson won with 4,086 votes, and won the November 2, 2004, general election with 9,662 votes (77.9%) against Lee Halper (D).
- 2006 With Halper's change of parties and challenge of Stevenson for the May 23, 2006, Republican primary, Stevenson won with 2,617 votes (76.2%), and won the November 7, 2006, general election with 6,631 votes (67.05%) against former United States Senate candidate Scott McClure (D).
- 2008 Unopposed for the May 27, 2008, Republican primary, Stevenson won with 3,628 votes, and was unopposed for the November 4, 2008, general election, winning with 11,767 votes.
- 2010 Unopposed for the May 25, 2010, Republican primary, Stevenson won with 4,257 votes; McClure was unopposed for the Democratic primary, setting up a rematch. Stevenson won the November 2, 2010, general election with 7,079 votes (75.7%) against McClure.
