= Sharon Block (politician) =

American politician

Member of the Idaho House of Representatives
- In office April 13, 2001 – November 30, 2012
- Preceded by: George Swan
- Succeeded by: Stephen Hartgen
- Constituency: 23rd district Seat B (2001–2002); 24th district Seat B (2002–2012)

Personal details
- Born: American Falls, Idaho
- Party: Republican
- Education: University of Idaho
- Occupation: Teacher, business person, politician

Sharon L. Block is an American politician, former school teacher, and business person from Idaho. Block was a Republican member of the Idaho House of Representatives for District 23 and 24 seat B.

== Early life ==
On April 15, 1941, Block was born in American Falls, Idaho.

== Education ==
Blocks earned a Bachelors of Science degree in Education from University of Idaho.

== Career ==
Block is a former elementary teacher for 15 years in the Magic Valley region of Idaho. In 1984, Block started a Property Management Company.

After the death of Representative George Swan on March 22, 2001, Block was appointed by Governor Dirk Kempthorne to finish Swan's term for Idaho House of Representatives for District 23.

On November 5, 2002, Block won the election and became a Republican member of Idaho House of Representatives for District 24 seat B. Block defeated Will Buhler with 67.5% of the votes. On November 2, 2004, as an incumbent, Block won the election and continued serving District 24 seat B. Block defeated Maggi Fortner. On November 7, 2006, as an incumbent, Block won the election with no opponent and continued serving District 24 seat B. On November 4, 2008, as an incumbent, Block won the election and continued serving District 24 seat B. Block defeated Carolyn Elexpury. On November 2, 2010, as an incumbent, Block won the election with no opponentopponent and continued serving District 24 seat B.

In 2012, after serving several terms as a member of Idaho House of Representatives, Block will not seek for another term.

== Awards ==
- 2011 Patricia Kempthorne Award (February 16, 2011). Presented by Regional Advisory Committees (RAC) on Substance Abuse Prevention and Treatment.

== Personal life ==
Block's husband is D. W. "Bill". They have two children. Block and her family live in Twin Falls, Idaho.

== See also ==
- Idaho Legislative District 23
- Idaho Legislative District 24
