= Camp Rupert =

WWII prisoner of war camp in Idaho, US

Coordinates: 42.605°N 113.884°W

Location in the United States
Location in Idaho

Camp Rupert was a World War II prisoner of war camp in the western United States, located in Minidoka County, Idaho, west of Paul. It was built for $1.5 million, which was everything needed for a city of 3,000: barracks, water, sewer, and a hospital. The first POWs were Italian and were received in May 1944, and 500 German POWs arrived that September.

The camp was in the Magic Valley, an irrigated agricultural area of the Snake River Plain, at an approximate elevation of 4,200 feet (1,280 m) above sea level. POWs set up an army-style branch camp to plant and harvest a crop, or to simply harvest the crop. They were transported from camp to the field in a truck. Approximately 15 prisoners were in a truck with one guard. The POWs, requested by a farmer, were transported by the farmer to his field. The farmer and the War Labor Board assigned a quota to the POWs.

German language information was provided to instruct the prisoners how to accomplish the task. These ranged from leaflets to a German language film produced by the Utah-Idaho Sugar Company.

Farmers were expected to guard the POWs, which led to complaints, such as from U-I Sugar, that the farmer couldn't get his other work done.

It was administered by Fort Douglas, Utah, and was a disciplinary camp German and Italian forces with disciplinary issues, such as prisoners who had attempted sit-down strikes and recaptured escapees. By December 1945, it contained hundreds of the Waffen SS. An estimated 15,000 POWs were attached to Camp Rupert.

After the end of World War II in Europe in May 1945, work assignments became heavier, and logistical challenges meant that food rations were meager. As images and reports from the Nazi concentration camps made it to the public, camp staff were less tolerant towards their POWs. Threats were made towards prisoners who failed to complete their assigned quotas, and non-labor activities were sharply limited.

At some time, a branch camp in Wyoming went on strike due to poor transportation to fields and leaky barracks roofs. And in the summer of 1945, 297 POWs went on strike for harsh work conditions. Three prisoners hit an American guard, and prisoners reported that an American sergeant was striking and kicking prisoners.

In the peak of October 1945, Camp Rupert was responsible for 15,047 prisoners. In part due to labor shortages in the United States, many POWs did not return to Europe until after the fall 1946 harvest.

Concurrently, Farragut Naval Training Station in northern Idaho also had several hundred prisoners of war.

The Minidoka War Relocation Center, an internment camp for Japanese Americans, was about twenty miles (30 km) west-northwest of Camp Rupert, in adjacent Jerome County.
