= Chance Requa =

American politician

Member-elect of the Idaho House of Representatives from the 24B district
- Assuming office December 2026
- Succeeding: Steve Miller

Personal details
- Party: Republican

Chance Requa is an American politician. A member of the Republican Party, he is the member-elect for the 24B district of the Idaho House of Representatives.
