= Empire School (Rupert, Idaho) =

- U.S. National Register of Historic Places
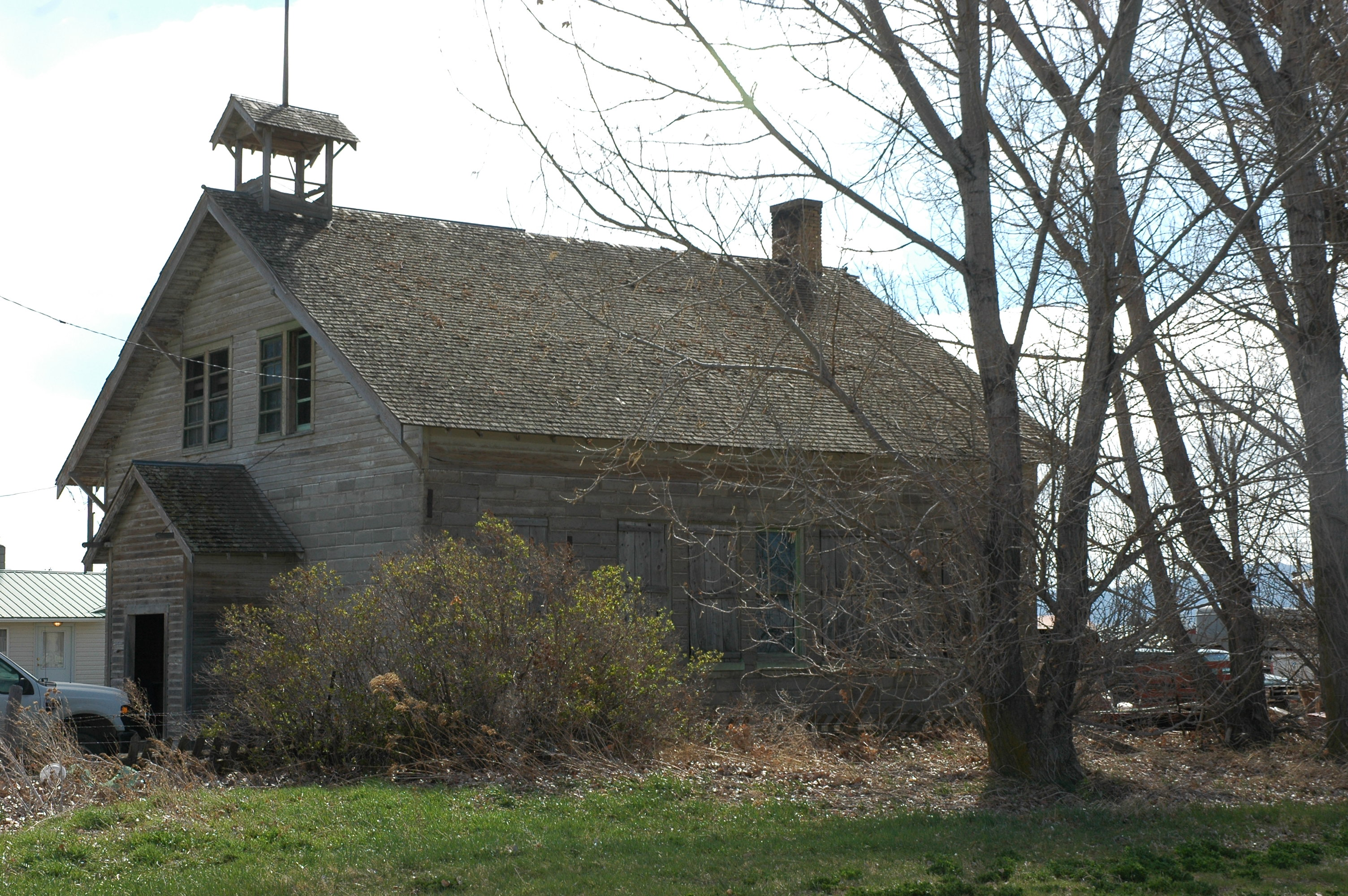
- The building's exterior in 2015

- Location within Idaho Location within the United States
- Location: 300 South 50 East, about 3 miles from Rupert, Idaho
- Coordinates: 42°34′33″N 113°39′29″W
- Area: less than one acre
- Built: 1917
- Built by: Meuleman, Gus
- MPS: Public School Buildings in Idaho MPS
- NRHP reference No.: 01000568
- Added to NRHP: May 30, 2001

The Empire School, located in rural Minidoka County, Idaho about 3 miles (4.8 km) south of Rupert, was listed on the National Register of Historic Places in 2001.

It was built in 1917 to replace an earlier school at the same location. It is about 40 by 44 feet (12 m × 13 m) in plan. The building has two rooms on the first floor and a single open room on the second floor which was used for assemblies, dances, holiday parties, and community events.

== See also ==
- List of National Historic Landmarks in Idaho
- National Register of Historic Places listings in Minidoka County, Idaho
