= David Leavitt (politician) =

American politician

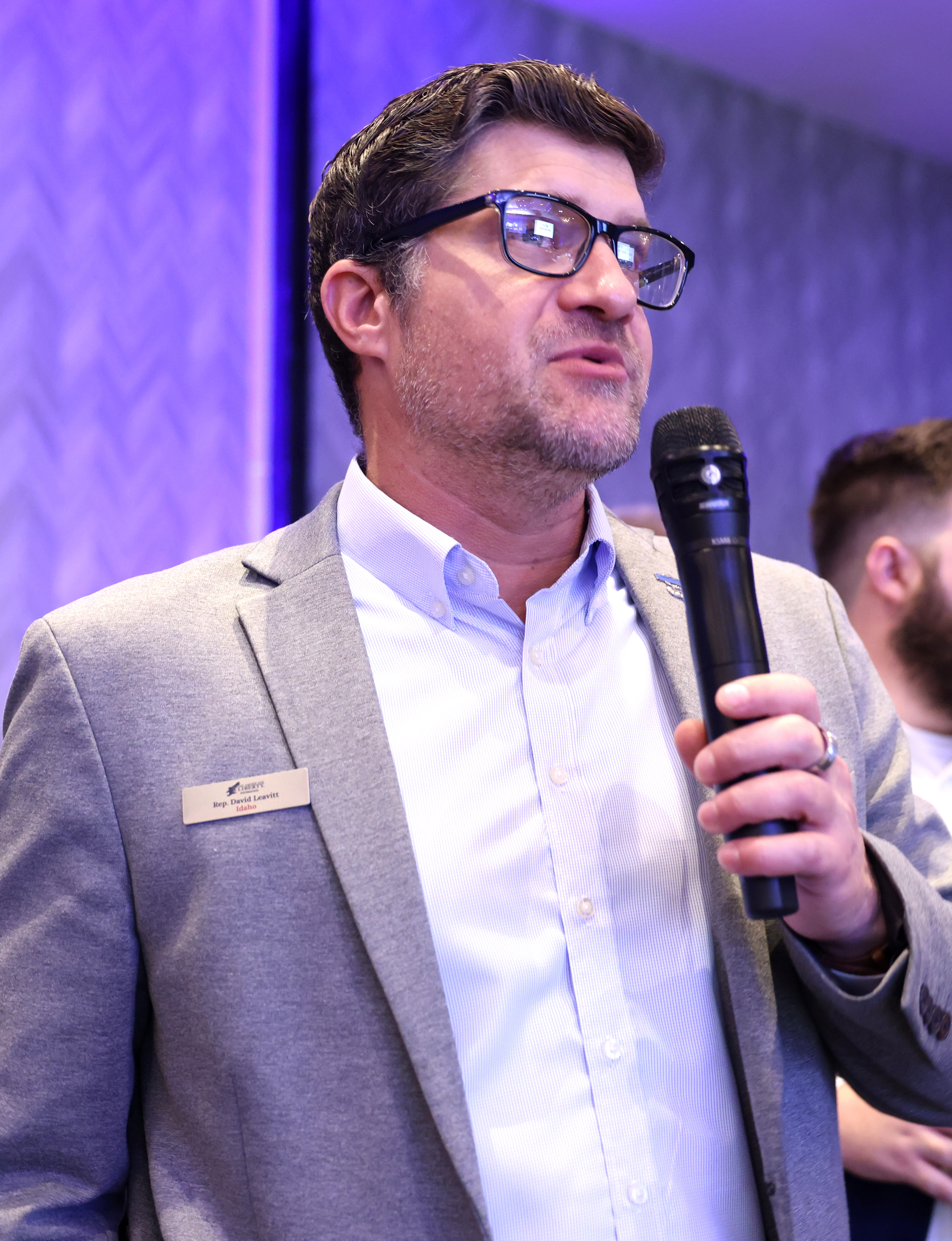
- Leavitt at the 2024 Hazlitt Summit hosted by Young Americans for Liberty Foundation

Member of the Idaho House of Representatives from the 25B district
- Incumbent
- Assumed office December 1, 2024
- Preceded by: Gregory Lanting

Personal details
- Born: Magic Valley, Idaho, U.S.
- Party: Republican

David J. Leavitt is an American politician. He serves as a Republican member for the 25B district of the Idaho House of Representatives.

== Life and career ==
Leavitt was born in Magic Valley, Idaho. He graduated from Capital High School.

In May 2024, Leavitt defeated Gregory Lanting in the Republican primary election for the 25B district of the Idaho House of Representatives. No Democratic candidate or incumbent was nominated to challenge him in the general election. He succeeded Lanting. He assumed office on December 1, 2024.

Leavitt was defeated by Cherie Vollmer in the Idaho primary election on May 19, 2026.
