= John Norby =

American football player (1910–1998)

Profile
- Position: Halfback

Personal information
- Born: August 30, 1910; Rupert, Idaho, U.S.
- Died: September 19, 1998 (aged 88); Spokane, Washington, U.S.
- Listed height: 6 ft 0 in (1.83 m)
- Listed weight: 195 lb (88 kg)

Career information
- High school: Rupert (ID)
- College: Idaho

Career history
- St. Louis Gunners (1934); Philadelphia Eagles (1934); New York Giants (1934); Brooklyn Dodgers (1935)

Awards and highlights
- NFL champion (1934)
- Stats at Pro Football Reference

John Heyerdahl Norby (August 30, 1910 – September 19, 1998) was an American professional football halfback in the National Football League (NFL) for the St. Louis Gunners, Philadelphia Eagles, New York Giants, and Brooklyn Dodgers.

He was from Rupert, Idaho and played college football for the Idaho Vandals.
