= National Register of Historic Places listings in Minidoka County, Idaho =

Location of Minidoka County in Idaho

This is a list of the National Register of Historic Places listings in Minidoka County, Idaho.

This is intended to be a complete list of the properties and districts on the National Register of Historic Places in Minidoka County, Idaho, United States. Latitude and longitude coordinates are provided for many National Register properties and districts; these locations may be seen together in a map.

There are 3 properties and districts listed on the National Register in the county. More may be added; properties and districts nationwide are added to the Register weekly.

This National Park Service list is complete through NPS recent listings posted September 25, 2026.

== Current listings ==
	Name on the Register	Image	Date listed	Location	City or town	Description
1	Empire School	Empire School	May 30, 2001 (#01000568)	50 E. 300 South; 42°34′33″N 113°39′29″W	Rupert vicinity	
2	Minidoka Dam and Power Plant	Minidoka Dam and Power Plant	October 29, 1974 (#74000746)	South of Minidoka; 42°40′11″N 113°28′52″W	Minidoka vicinity	
3	Rupert Town Square Historic District	Rupert Town Square Historic District	January 17, 2001 (#00001626)	Roughly bounded by 7th St., E St., 5th St., and F St.; also 702 E St. and 405 6th St. 42°37′03″N 113°40′24″W	Rupert	Specific addresses represent a boundary increase of March 17, 2010

== See also ==
- List of National Historic Landmarks in Idaho
- National Register of Historic Places listings in Idaho
