= Steve Miller (Idaho politician) =

American politician

Member of the Idaho House of Representatives
- Incumbent
- Assumed office December 1, 2022
- Preceded by: Linda Wright Hartgen (redistricting)
- Succeeded by: Chance Requa (elect)
- Constituency: 24th district Seat B
- In office December 1, 2012 – November 30, 2020
- Preceded by: Bert Stevenson (redistricting)
- Succeeded by: Marianna Davis
- Constituency: 26th district Seat A

Personal details
- Born: Wendell, Idaho
- Party: Republican
- Spouse(s): Linda Coates (m. 1969; died 2012) Cheryl Sandy (m. 2015)
- Education: University of Idaho (BS)

Steven Miller (born in Wendell, Idaho) is an American politician serving as a Republican member of the Idaho State Representative from District 24 in the B seat. He previously represented District 26 in the A seat from 2012 until 2018. Miller is a rancher and farmer by profession.

== Education ==
Miller earned his BS degree in agricultural engineering from the University of Idaho.

== Idaho House of Representatives ==
=== Committee assignments ===
- Agricultural Affairs Committee
- Appropriations Committee
- Joint Finance-Appropriations Committee
- Resources and Conservation Committee

== Elections ==
District 26 House Seat A - Blaine, Camas, Gooding, and Lincoln Counties
Year	Candidate	Votes	Pct	Candidate	Votes	Pct
2012 Primary	Steve Miller	2,273	100%			
2012 General	Steve Miller	8,535	50.9%	John Remington	8,229	49.1%
2014 Primary	Steve Miller (incumbent)	3,047	100%			
2014 General	Steve Miller (incumbent)	6,411	50.5%	Dick Fosbury	6,285	49.5%
2016 Primary	Steve Miller (incumbent)	2,679	100%			
2016 General	Steve Miller (incumbent)	9,222	50.7%	Kathleen Eder	8,958	49.3%
