= Charles Coiner =

American politician from Idaho

Member of the Idaho Senate from District 24
- In office December 1, 2004 – November 30, 2010
- Preceded by: Laird Noh
- Succeeded by: Lee Heider

Personal details
- Party: Republican

Charles H. Coiner (born April 25, 1943) is a Republican former Idaho State Senator, who represented the 24th Legislative District from 2004 to 2010.

Born in Twin Falls, Idaho, Coiner grew up just 15 miles (24 km) from the Minidoka Relocation Center, where 9,000 Japanese Americans were placed in internment camps by order of Democratic President Franklin D. Roosevelt's Executive Order 9066. After earning his high school diploma from Hansen High School in 1961, Coiner earned his Bachelor of Arts degree in Architecture from Stanford University in 1965.

Coiner began operating his family farm in 1974. He later became Chairman of the Twin Falls Canal Company and President of Milner Dam. He also served as Chair of the Upper Snake River Basin Advisory Group, on the Twin Falls City Water Planning Committee, and as a member of the Southeast Twin Falls Transportation Corridor Study.

First elected to the Idaho Senate in 2004, Coiner served as Vice-Chair of the Senate Commerce and Human Resources Committee during his entire tenure in the Senate. He also served on the Senate Committees on Health and Welfare, on Resources and Environment, and on Agricultural Affairs. He was also a member of the Senate Natural Resources Interim Committee, Senate Mental Health and Substance Abuse Interim Committee, Council of State Governments River Governance Group, and Pacific Northwest Economic Region.

While a Senator, Coiner supported efforts by the Friends of Minidoka nonprofit organization to incorporate the Japanese-American internment during World War II into the history curriculum of Idaho public schools. Coiner was unopposed in his 2008 re-election.

Coiner and his wife, Carolyn, have two children: Dylan and Morgan.

Idaho Senate
Preceded by Laird Noh	Idaho State Senator; 24th District; 2004–2010	Succeeded by Lee Heider
