= Idaho State Highway 25 =

State highway in Idaho, United States

State Highway 25
- SH-25 highlighted in red

Route information
- Maintained by ITD
- Length: 58.048 mi (93.419 km)

Major junctions
- West end: I-84 / SH-77 near Jerome
- US 93
- East end: I-84 near Declo

Location
- Country: United States
- State: Idaho

Highway system
- Idaho State Highway System; Interstate; US; State
← SH-24	→ US 26

State Highway 25 (SH-25) is a 58.048-mile-long (93.419 km) state highway in Idaho, United States, that runs east-west from Jerome in the west to Interstate 84 (I-84) north of Declo in the east. Idaho State Highway 25 also passes through Eden, Hazleton, Paul, and Rupert.

== Route description ==
SH-25 begins at a diamond interchange with I-84, before traveling due east as Main Street into the town of Jerome, where it intersects SH-79. After leaving the town, SH-25 continues due east through farmland, passing by Jerome County Airport, and coming to a junction with US 93. SH-25 curves southeast before intersecting SH-50 and turning east again, passing through the towns of Eden and Hazelton. The road comes to a diamond interchange with I-84, where SH-25 continues east on I-84 until the next exit, where it splits to the northeast at another diamond interchange.

SH-25 continues east into the town of Paul, where it intersects SH-27. After passing the Rupert Country Club, it comes to a T intersection with SH-24 and turns northeast, running concurrently with SH-24 through the city of Rupert, where SH-25 continues east as Baseline Road. The highway makes a sharp turn south, crossing the Snake River before terminating at I-84.

== Major intersections ==
County	Location	mi	km	Destinations	Notes
Jerome		0.000	0.000	I-84	I-84 exit 165
Jerome	Jerome	1.498	2.411	SH-79 (Lincoln Avenue)	
Jerome		5.353	8.615	US 93	
Jerome		19.112	30.758	SH-50 Conn.	
Jerome		19.258	30.993	SH-50	
Jerome		30.396	48.918	I-84	I-84 exit 194, begin overlap
Jerome		37.675	60.632	I-84	I-84 exit 201, end overlap
Jerome	Paul	46.025	74.070	SH-27	
Minidoka	Rupert	50.978	82.041	SH-24	Begin overlap
Minidoka	Rupert	52.455	84.418	SH-24	End overlap
Cassia		58.048	93.419	I-84 / SH-77	I-84 exit 216
1.000 mi = 1.609 km; 1.000 km = 0.621 mi: Concurrency terminus

== See also ==
- List of state highways in Idaho
- List of highways numbered 25
