= Burley micropolitan area, Idaho =

Coordinates: 42°30′N 113°48′W

Burley Micropolitan Area
- Micropolitan Statistical Area
- Burley, ID Micropolitan Statistical Area
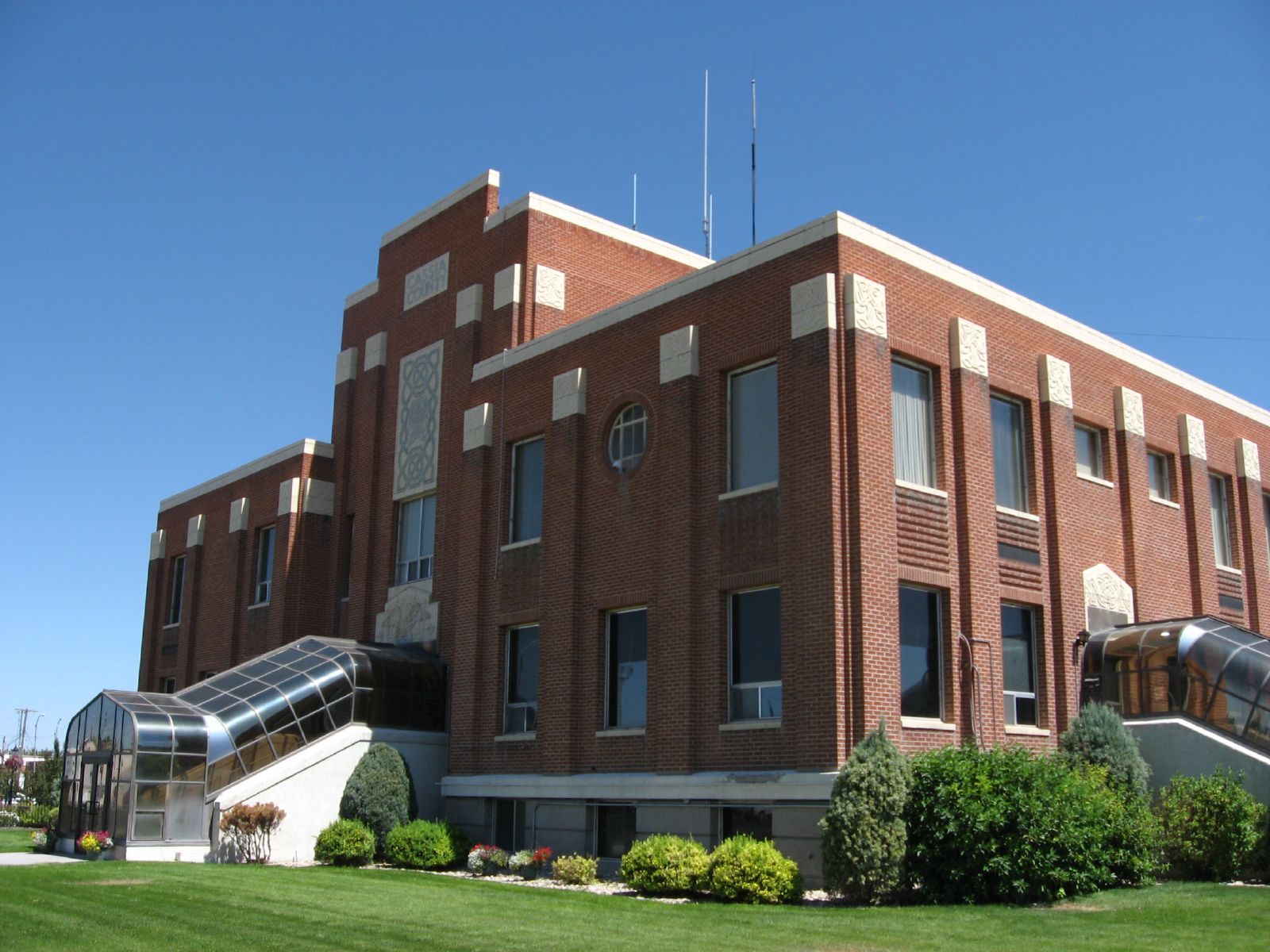
- Cassia County Courthouse
Interactive Map of Burley, ID μSA
City of Burley
Burley, ID μSA
- Country: United States
- State: Idaho
- Largest city: Burley
- Other cities: Rupert
- Time zone: UTC-7 (MST)
  - Summer (DST): UTC-6 (MDT)

The Burley Micropolitan Statistical Area, as defined by the United States Census Bureau, is an area consisting of two counties in the Magic Valley region of Idaho, anchored by the city of Burley. It is commonly referred to locally as the "Mini-Cassia" area, an amalgam of Minidoka and Cassia Counties.

As of the 2000 census, the micropolitan statistical area(μSA) had a population of 41,590 (though a July 1, 2009 estimate placed the population at 40,924).

== Counties ==
- Cassia
- Minidoka

== Communities ==
- Acequia
- Albion
- Almo (unincorporated)
- Burley (principal city)
- Declo
- Heyburn
- Malta
- Minidoka
- Oakley
- Paul
- Rupert

== Demographics ==
As of the census of 2000, there were 41,590 people, 14,033 households, and 10,847 families residing within the μSA. The racial makeup of the μSA was 81.48% White, 0.21% African American, 0.84% Native American, 0.39% Asian, 0.04% Pacific Islander, 14.86% from other races, and 2.19% from two or more races. Hispanic or Latino of any race were 22.00% of the population.

The median income for a household in the μSA was $32,672, and the median income for a family was $37,331. Males had a median income of $29,055 versus $19,686 for females. The per capita income for the μSA was $13,950.

== See also ==
- Idaho census statistical areas
