= 1948 United States presidential election in Idaho =

- November 2, 1948

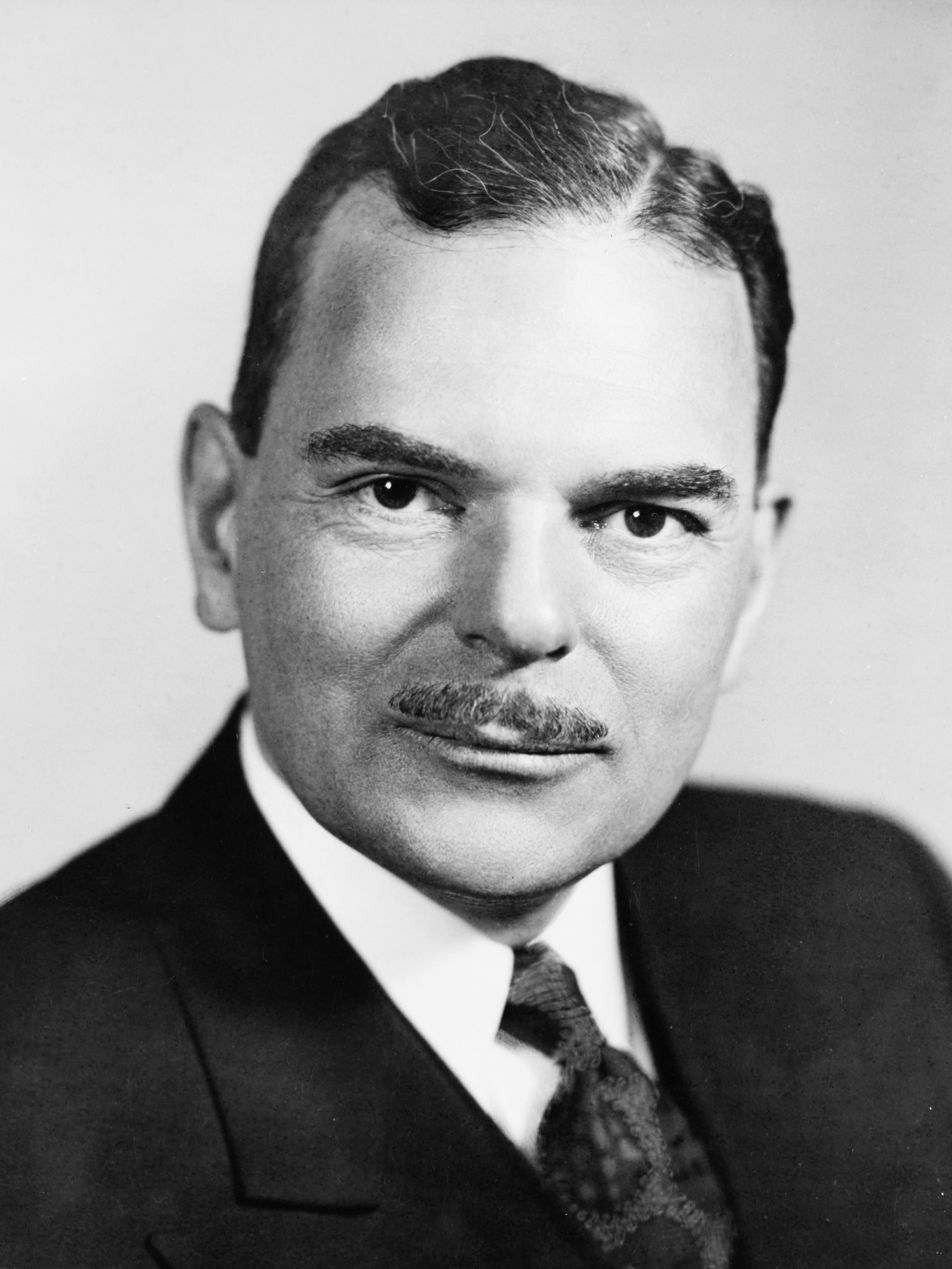
Nominee	Harry S. Truman	Thomas E. Dewey
Party	Democratic	Republican
Home state	Missouri	New York
Running mate	Alben W. Barkley	Earl Warren
Electoral vote	4	0
Popular vote	107,370	101,514
Percentage	49.98%	47.26%
County results
Truman
40–50%
50–60%
60–70%
Dewey
40–50%
50–60%
60–70%
President before election
Harry S. Truman
Democratic
Elected President
Harry S. Truman
Democratic

The 1948 United States presidential election in Idaho took place on November 2, 1948, as part of the 1948 United States presidential election. State voters chose four representatives, or electors, to the Electoral College, who voted for president and vice president.

Franklin D. Roosevelt had carried Idaho in all four of his presidential runs, carrying the state by more than 20 points in 1932 and 1936, but by a narrower 9 points in 1940 and only 3.5 points in 1944. However, Oregon Senator Wayne Morse said that Dewey would fail to maintain these gains in the West if Bureau of Reclamation programs were cut as demanded by the House Appropriations Committee. Truman campaigned heavily in the West, including Idaho, arguing that the region was an economic colony of Wall Street under the GOP and that only the Democratic Party could give the region direct access to its natural resources. While in Pocatello, Truman also defended himself against charges of corruption by machine politics from his days in Kansas City.

Idaho was won by incumbent President Harry S. Truman (D–Missouri), running with Senator Alben W. Barkley, with 49.98% of the popular vote, against Governor Thomas E. Dewey (R–New York), running with Governor Earl Warren, with 47.26% of the popular vote.

This election marked the conclusion of Idaho's status as a swing state, as it would quickly become one of the most Republican states in the nation. In 1950, Republicans would score landslide wins in the state elections, and Idaho has subsequently supported a Democratic presidential nominee only once, when Lyndon B. Johnson carried the state by 1.83 points in 1964, amidst a national Democratic landslide. Furthermore, other than Johnson, no Democrat except John F. Kennedy in 1960 has won even 40% of the state's vote. Idaho is one of only eight states (Note: The others are Arizona, Arkansas, Florida, Georgia, North Carolina, Oklahoma and Texas.) where Truman's margin has not been matched by any subsequent Democrat. In all remaining non-Confederate states, Lyndon Johnson outran Truman's narrow victory in his 1964 landslide. (Note: Although in Tennessee Truman outperformed Johnson by margin, both were outperformed by Jimmy Carter in 1976.)

This is the last election in which the southeastern Mormon counties of Bonneville, Bingham, Jefferson, Madison, Minidoka and Oneida have voted for a Democratic presidential candidate.

== Results ==
1948 United States presidential election in Idaho
Party	Candidate	Votes	%
Democratic	Harry S. Truman (inc.)	107,370	49.98%
Republican	Thomas E. Dewey	101,514	47.26%
Progressive	Henry A. Wallace	4,972	2.31%
Prohibition	Claude A. Watson	628	0.29%
Socialist	Norman Thomas	332	0.15%
Total votes		214,816	100.00%

=== Results by county ===
County	Harry S. Truman Democratic		Thomas E. Dewey Republican		Henry A. Wallace Progressive		Claude A. Watson Prohibition		Norman Thomas Socialist		Margin		Total votes cast
County	#	%	#	%	#	%	#	%	#	%	#	%	Total votes cast
Ada	11,253	42.14%	14,972	56.06%	389	1.46%	48	0.18%	43	0.16%	-3,719	-13.92%	26,705
Adams	647	50.78%	603	47.33%	19	1.49%	4	0.31%	1	0.08%	44	3.45%	1,274
Bannock	9,679	62.20%	5,580	35.86%	289	1.86%	4	0.03%	8	0.05%	4,099	26.34%	15,560
Bear Lake	1,664	50.73%	1,590	48.48%	25	0.76%	1	0.03%	0	0.00%	74	2.25%	3,280
Benewah	1,590	58.22%	1,038	38.01%	85	3.11%	11	0.40%	7	0.26%	552	20.21%	2,731
Bingham	3,197	49.58%	3,162	49.04%	84	1.30%	5	0.08%	0	0.00%	35	0.54%	6,448
Blaine	1,182	54.67%	945	43.71%	34	1.57%	1	0.05%	0	0.00%	237	10.96%	2,162
Boise	479	50.96%	437	46.49%	24	2.55%	0	0.00%	0	0.00%	42	4.47%	940
Bonner	2,916	49.70%	2,666	45.44%	268	4.57%	8	0.14%	9	0.15%	250	4.26%	5,867
Bonneville	5,382	53.81%	4,499	44.99%	100	1.00%	3	0.03%	17	0.17%	883	8.82%	10,001
Boundary	1,029	49.02%	910	43.35%	142	6.77%	2	0.10%	16	0.76%	119	5.67%	2,099
Butte	426	50.35%	412	48.70%	8	0.95%	0	0.00%	0	0.00%	14	1.65%	846
Camas	278	48.35%	289	50.26%	8	1.39%	0	0.00%	0	0.00%	-11	-1.91%	575
Canyon	7,903	43.04%	9,700	52.82%	389	2.12%	323	1.76%	43	0.23%	-1,797	-9.78%	18,363
Caribou	475	51.08%	447	48.06%	7	0.75%	1	0.11%	0	0.00%	28	3.02%	930
Cassia	2,178	46.63%	2,424	51.89%	63	1.35%	3	0.06%	3	0.06%	-246	-5.26%	4,671
Clark	165	38.19%	262	60.65%	4	0.93%	1	0.23%	0	0.00%	-97	-22.46%	432
Clearwater	1,571	61.63%	820	32.17%	132	5.18%	20	0.78%	6	0.24%	751	29.46%	2,549
Custer	625	49.72%	612	48.69%	16	1.27%	4	0.32%	0	0.00%	13	1.03%	1,257
Elmore	1,589	63.48%	854	34.12%	51	2.04%	5	0.20%	4	0.16%	735	29.36%	2,503
Franklin	1,763	46.24%	2,028	53.19%	21	0.55%	1	0.03%	0	0.00%	-265	-6.95%	3,813
Fremont	2,014	52.85%	1,777	46.63%	16	0.42%	4	0.10%	0	0.00%	237	6.22%	3,811
Gem	1,724	50.32%	1,585	46.26%	85	2.48%	29	0.85%	3	0.09%	139	4.06%	3,426
Gooding	1,844	45.93%	2,111	52.58%	51	1.27%	6	0.15%	3	0.07%	-267	-6.65%	4,015
Idaho	2,300	54.53%	1,790	42.44%	117	2.77%	7	0.17%	4	0.09%	510	12.09%	4,218
Jefferson	2,017	56.53%	1,490	41.76%	56	1.57%	5	0.14%	0	0.00%	527	14.77%	3,568
Jerome	2,124	49.34%	2,128	49.43%	48	1.11%	2	0.05%	3	0.07%	-4	-0.09%	4,305
Kootenai	5,284	51.49%	4,265	41.56%	668	6.51%	13	0.13%	32	0.31%	1,019	9.93%	10,262
Latah	3,810	48.30%	3,805	48.23%	225	2.85%	31	0.39%	18	0.23%	5	0.07%	7,889
Lemhi	864	44.58%	1,037	53.51%	36	1.86%	1	0.05%	0	0.00%	-173	-8.93%	1,938
Lewis	1,224	69.43%	487	27.62%	46	2.61%	3	0.17%	3	0.17%	737	41.81%	1,763
Lincoln	748	46.26%	851	52.63%	18	1.11%	0	0.00%	0	0.00%	-103	-6.37%	1,617
Madison	2,024	55.50%	1,602	43.93%	21	0.58%	0	0.00%	0	0.00%	422	11.57%	3,647
Minidoka	1,668	48.60%	1,654	48.19%	101	2.94%	4	0.12%	5	0.15%	14	0.41%	3,432
Nez Perce	5,747	61.65%	3,168	33.98%	357	3.83%	27	0.29%	23	0.25%	2,579	27.67%	9,322
Oneida	1,008	50.86%	962	48.54%	10	0.50%	2	0.10%	0	0.00%	46	2.32%	1,982
Owyhee	925	47.75%	969	50.03%	32	1.65%	9	0.46%	2	0.10%	-44	-2.28%	1,937
Payette	1,568	38.42%	2,430	59.54%	58	1.42%	16	0.39%	9	0.22%	-862	-21.12%	4,081
Power	795	47.29%	875	52.05%	7	0.42%	4	0.24%	0	0.00%	-80	-4.76%	1,681
Shoshone	4,472	54.13%	3,200	38.74%	569	6.89%	8	0.10%	12	0.15%	1,272	15.39%	8,261
Teton	672	52.83%	593	46.62%	4	0.31%	1	0.08%	2	0.16%	79	6.21%	1,272
Twin Falls	6,019	42.81%	7,833	55.71%	172	1.22%	21	0.15%	16	0.11%	-1,814	-12.90%	14,061
Valley	828	44.98%	939	51.00%	65	3.53%	3	0.16%	6	0.33%	-111	-6.02%	1,841
Washington	1,700	48.84%	1,713	49.21%	52	1.49%	10	0.29%	6	0.17%	-13	-0.37%	3,481
Totals	107,370	49.98%	101,514	47.26%	4,972	2.31%	628	0.29%	332	0.15%	5,856	2.72%	214,816

==== Counties that flipped from Democratic to Republican ====
- Camas
- Franklin

==== Counties that flipped from Republican to Democratic ====
- Boundary
- Butte
- Latah
- Minidoka

== See also ==
- United States presidential elections in Idaho
