= Idaho's 24th legislative district =

American legislative district

Idaho's 24th legislative district is one of 35 districts of the Idaho Legislature. It is currently represented by Senator Lee Heider, Republican of Twin Falls, Representative Lance Clow, Republican of Twin Falls, and Representative Stephen Hartgen, Republican of Twin Falls.

== District profile ==
=== 1984–1992 ===
From 1984 to 1992, District 24 consisted of all of Cassia, Jerome, and Minidoka Counties.

Legislature	Session	Senate Seat A	Senate Seat B	House Seat A	House Seat B	House Seat C	House Seat D
47th (1984 - 1986)	1st	Denton Darrington (R)	Lynn Tominaga (R)	Ernest Hale (R)	Vard Chatburn (R)	Steve Antone (R)	Waldo Martens (R)
47th (1984 - 1986)	2nd	Denton Darrington (R)	Lynn Tominaga (R)	Ernest Hale (R)	Vard Chatburn (R)	Steve Antone (R)	Waldo Martens (R)
48th (1986 - 1988)	1st	Denton Darrington (R)	Lynn Tominaga (R)	Ernest Hale (R)	Bruce Newcomb (R)	Steve Antone (R)	Waldo Martens (R)
48th (1986 - 1988)	2nd	Denton Darrington (R)	Lynn Tominaga (R)	Ernest Hale (R)	Bruce Newcomb (R)	Steve Antone (R)	Waldo Martens (R)
49th (1988 - 1990)	1st	Denton Darrington (R)	Lynn Tominaga (R)	Ernest Hale (R)	Bruce Newcomb (R)	Steve Antone (R)	Maxine Bell (R)
49th (1988 - 1990)	2nd	Denton Darrington (R)	Lynn Tominaga (R)	Ernest Hale (R)	Bruce Newcomb (R)	Steve Antone (R)	Maxine Bell (R)
50th (1990 - 1992)	1st	Denton Darrington (R)	Lynn Tominaga (R)	Jim Kempton (R)	Bruce Newcomb (R)	Steve Antone (R)	Maxine Bell (R)
50th (1990 - 1992)	2nd	Denton Darrington (R)	Dean Cameron (R)	Jim Kempton (R)	Bruce Newcomb (R)	Steve Antone (R)	Maxine Bell (R)

=== 1992–2002 ===
From 1992 to 2002, District 24 consisted Jerome County and a portion of Minidoka County.

Legislature	Session	Senate	House Seat A	House Seat B
51st (1992 - 1994)	1st	Dean Cameron (R)	Steve Antone (R)	Maxine Bell (R)
51st (1992 - 1994)	2nd	Dean Cameron (R)	Steve Antone (R)	Maxine Bell (R)
52nd (1994 - 1996)	1st	Dean Cameron (R)	Steve Antone (R)	Maxine Bell (R)
52nd (1994 - 1996)	2nd	Dean Cameron (R)	Steve Antone (R)	Maxine Bell (R)
53rd (1996 - 1998)	1st	Dean Cameron (R)	Bert Stevenson (R)	Maxine Bell (R)
53rd (1996 - 1998)	2nd	Dean Cameron (R)	Bert Stevenson (R)	Maxine Bell (R)
54th (1998 - 2000)	1st	Dean Cameron (R)	Bert Stevenson (R)	Maxine Bell (R)
54th (1998 - 2000)	2nd	Dean Cameron (R)	Bert Stevenson (R)	Maxine Bell (R)
55th (2000 - 2002)	1st	Dean Cameron (R)	Bert Stevenson (R)	Maxine Bell (R)
55th (2000 - 2002)	2nd	Dean Cameron (R)	Bert Stevenson (R)	Maxine Bell (R)

=== 2002–2012 ===
From 2002 to 2012, District 24 consisted of a portion of Twin Falls County.

Legislature	Session	Senate	House Seat A	House Seat B
57th (2002 - 2004)	1st	Laird Noh (R)	Leon Smith (R)	Sharon Block (R)
57th (2002 - 2004)	2nd	Laird Noh (R)	Leon Smith (R)	Sharon Block (R)
58th (2004 - 2006)	1st	Charles Coiner (R)	Leon Smith (R)	Sharon Block (R)
58th (2004 - 2006)	2nd	Charles Coiner (R)	Leon Smith (R)	Sharon Block (R)
59th (2006 - 2008)	1st	Charles Coiner (R)	Leon Smith (R)	Sharon Block (R)
59th (2006 - 2008)	2nd	Charles Coiner (R)	Leon Smith (R)	Sharon Block (R)
60th (2008 - 2010)	1st	Charles Coiner (R)	Leon Smith (R)	Sharon Block (R)
60th (2008 - 2010)	2nd	Charles Coiner (R)	Leon Smith (R)	Sharon Block (R)
61st (2010 - 2012)	1st	Lee Heider (R)	Leon Smith (R)	Sharon Block (R)
61st (2010 - 2012)	2nd	Lee Heider (R)	Leon Smith (R)	Sharon Block (R)

=== 2012–2022 ===
District 24 currently consists of a portion of Twin Falls County.

Legislature	Session	Senate	House Seat A	House Seat B
62nd (2012 - 2014)	1st	Lee Heider (R)	Lance Clow (R)	Stephen Hartgen (R)
62nd (2012 - 2014)	2nd	Lee Heider (R)	Lance Clow (R)	Stephen Hartgen (R)
63rd (2014 - 2016)	1st	Lee Heider (R)	Lance Clow (R)	Stephen Hartgen (R)
63rd (2014 - 2016)	2nd	Lee Heider (R)	Lance Clow (R)	Stephen Hartgen (R)
64th (2016 - 2018)	1st	Lee Heider (R)	Lance Clow (R)	Stephen Hartgen (R)
64th (2016 - 2018)	2nd	Lee Heider (R)	Lance Clow (R)	Stephen Hartgen (R)
65th (2018 - 2020)	1st	Lee Heider (R)	Lance Clow (R)	Linda Wright Hartgen (R)
65th (2018 - 2020)	2nd	Lee Heider (R)	Lance Clow (R)	Linda Wright Hartgen (R)
66th (2020 - 2022)	1st	Lee Heider (R)	Lance Clow (R)	Linda Wright Hartgen (R)
66th (2020 - 2022)	2nd	Lee Heider (R)	Lance Clow (R)	Linda Wright Hartgen (R)

=== 2022–present ===
Beginning in December 2022, District 24 will consist of Camas and Gooding Counties and a portion Twin Falls County.

== See also ==
- List of Idaho senators
- List of Idaho representatives
