= Gooding Milner canal =

Coordinates: 42°31′39″N 114°00′36″W

The Gooding Milner canal is an irrigation canal that runs through the Magic Valley (in Idaho, United States) providing water to nearby farms. It starts 8 miles west of Burley, at the Milner Dam and runs past Eden, Hazelton, Dietrich, Shoshone and Bliss before emptying into the Big Wood River in Gooding.

The Little Wood River is a tributary with several small ditches as well.
