= Steve Antone =

American politician

- Born: November 17, 1921; Burley, Idaho, U.S.
- Died: April 19, 2014 (aged 92)
- Occupation: Farmer Politician

Steve Antone (November 17, 1921 – April 19, 2014) was an American farmer and politician.

Born in Burley, Idaho, Antone served in the United States Army Air Forces during World War II. Antone lived in Rupert, Idaho and was a farmer in Minidoka County. He served in the Idaho House of Representatives, representing primary Minidoka County as a Republican, from 1969 until 1996. He died in Draper, Utah.
