= Heyburn, Idaho =

- City
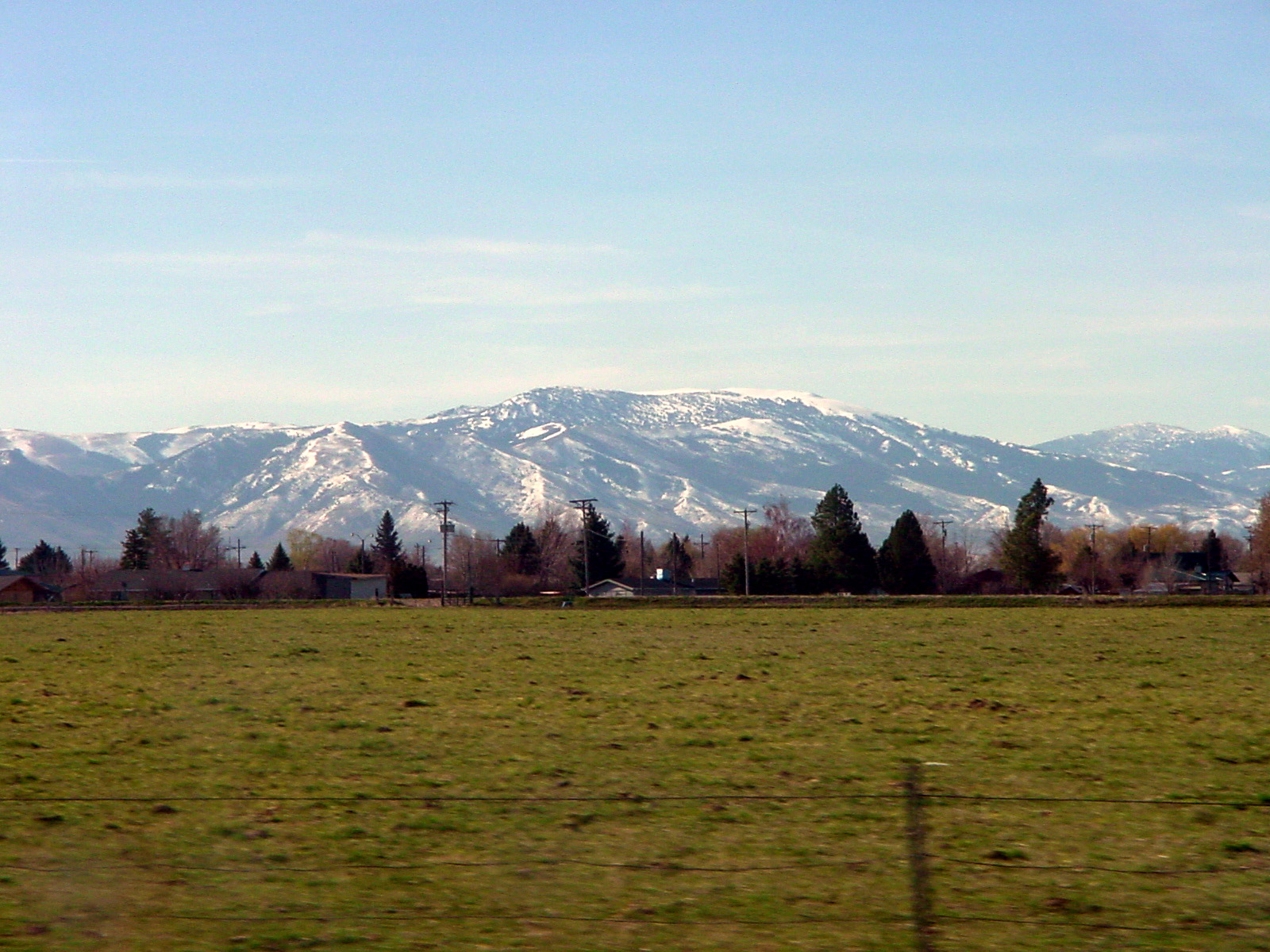
- Looking south from Heyburn toward the Albion Mountains
- Motto: "Where people are important"
- Location in Minidoka County, Idaho
- Coordinates: 42°33′41″N 113°45′06″W
- Country: United States
- State: Idaho
- County: Minidoka

Area
  - Total: 2.66 sq mi (6.88 km^{2})
  - Land: 2.61 sq mi (6.76 km^{2})
  - Water: 0.042 sq mi (0.11 km^{2})
- Elevation: 4,154 ft (1,266 m)

Population (2020)
  - Total: 3,700
  - Density: 1,416.5/sq mi (546.9/km^{2})
- Time zone: UTC-7 (Mountain (MST))
  - Summer (DST): UTC-6 (MDT)
- ZIP code: 83336
- Area codes: 208, 986
- FIPS code: 16-37360
- GNIS feature ID: 2410753
- Website: heyburn.id.gov

Heyburn is a city in Minidoka County, Idaho, United States. The population was 3,700 at the 2020 census, up from 3,089 in 2010. It is part of the Burley micropolitan area.

== History ==
The city was named after Weldon B. Heyburn, a U.S. senator for Idaho from 1903 to 1912.

A Simplot potato-processing plant in Heyburn employed about 650 residents in the area and was a mainstay of the local economy, from its opening in 1960, through its closure in 2003. After the plant's closure, the city of Burley took ownership of the property. It currently operates an industrial park there. In the aftermath of the plant closure, voters in Burley, Rupert, and Heyburn approved bond issues to expand and upgrade wastewater infrastructure. This allowed other food processing companies to come to the area, which in turn stabilized and diversified the local economy.

== Geography ==
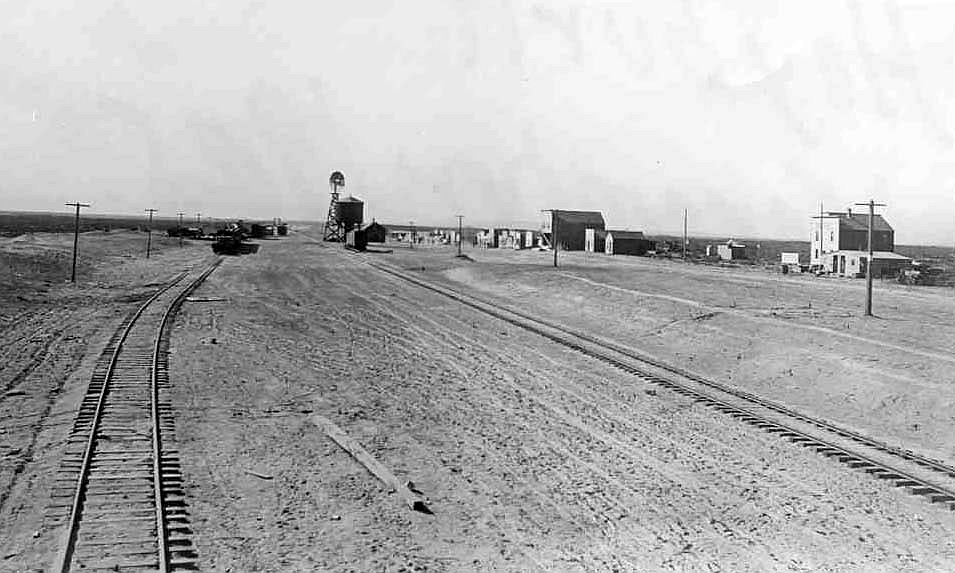
Heyburn, 1905

Heyburn sits on the southern edge of Minidoka County, bounded to the south by the Snake River, which forms the Cassia County line. The city of Burley borders Heyburn to the south and west. Interstate 84 passes through the north side of the city, with access from Exits 208 and 211. I-84 leads west 37 miles (60 km) to the Twin Falls area and southeast 145 miles (233 km) to Ogden, Utah. U.S. Route 30 passes through the southeast part of Heyburn running from Exit 211 of I-84 southwest across the Snake River into Burley. Idaho State Highway 27 passes through the west side of Heyburn, connecting Burley to the south with Paul 3 miles (5 km) to the north.

According to the United States Census Bureau, Heyburn has a total area of 2.7 square miles (7.0 km^{2}), of which 0.04 square miles (0.10 km^{2}), or 1.66%, are water.

== Demographics ==
Historical population
Census	Pop.	Note	%±
1920	292		—
1930	201		−31.2%
1940	413		105.5%
1950	539		30.5%
1960	829		53.8%
1970	1,637		97.5%
1980	2,889		76.5%
1990	2,714		−6.1%
2000	2,899		6.8%
2010	3,089		6.6%
2020	3,700		19.8%
U.S. Decennial Census

=== 2020 census ===
As of the 2020 census, Heyburn had a population of 3,700. The median age was 31.3 years. 30.9% of residents were under the age of 18 and 13.9% of residents were 65 years of age or older. For every 100 females there were 98.7 males, and for every 100 females age 18 and over there were 95.4 males age 18 and over.

99.7% of residents lived in urban areas, while 0.3% lived in rural areas.

There were 1,335 households in Heyburn, of which 38.9% had children under the age of 18 living in them. Of all households, 47.6% were married-couple households, 17.2% were households with a male householder and no spouse or partner present, and 27.4% were households with a female householder and no spouse or partner present. About 22.8% of all households were made up of individuals and 8.3% had someone living alone who was 65 years of age or older.

There were 1,413 housing units, of which 5.5% were vacant. The homeowner vacancy rate was 2.0% and the rental vacancy rate was 7.3%.

Racial composition as of the 2020 census
Race	Number	Percent
White	2,409	65.1%
Black or African American	15	0.4%
American Indian and Alaska Native	68	1.8%
Asian	12	0.3%
Native Hawaiian and Other Pacific Islander	6	0.2%
Some other race	700	18.9%
Two or more races	490	13.2%
Hispanic or Latino (of any race)	1,450	39.2%

=== 2010 census ===
As of the census of 2010, there were 3,089 people, 1,109 households, and 830 families residing in the city. The population density was 1,144.1 inhabitants per square mile (441.7/km^{2}). There were 1,165 housing units at an average density of 431.5 per square mile (166.6/km^{2}). The racial makeup of the city was 77.4% White, 0.6% African American, 2.3% Native American, 0.6% Asian, 16.6% from other races, and 2.6% from two or more races. Hispanic or Latino of any race were 32.5% of the population.

There were 1,109 households, of which 38.5% had children under the age of 18 living with them, 58.3% were married couples living together, 10.6% had a female householder with no husband present, 6.0% had a male householder with no wife present, and 25.2% were non-families. 21.9% of all households were made up of individuals, and 7.9% had someone living alone who was 65 years of age or older. The average household size was 2.79 and the average family size was 3.26.

The median age in the city was 32.8 years. 29.8% of residents were under the age of 18; 8.9% were between the ages of 18 and 24; 24.1% were from 25 to 44; 23.6% were from 45 to 64; and 13.6% were 65 years of age or older. The gender makeup of the city was 50.4% male and 49.6% female.

=== 2000 census ===
As of the census of 2000, there were 2,899 people, 1,002 households, and 787 families residing in the city. The population density was 1,510.7 inhabitants per square mile (583.3/km^{2}). There were 1,056 housing units at an average density of 550.3 per square mile (212.5/km^{2}). The racial makeup of the city was 74.92% White, 0.17% African American, 1.10% Native American, 0.52% Asian, 0.07% Pacific Islander, 20.08% from other races, and 3.14% from two or more races. Hispanic or Latino of any race were 28.39% of the population.

There were 1,002 households, out of which 41.5% had children under the age of 18 living with them, 62.6% were married couples living together, 11.7% had a female householder with no husband present, and 21.4% were non-families. 18.5% of all households were made up of individuals, and 6.7% had someone living alone who was 65 years of age or older. The average household size was 2.89 and the average family size was 3.28.

In the city, the population was spread out, with 32.5% under the age of 18, 10.0% from 18 to 24, 26.0% from 25 to 44, 22.2% from 45 to 64, and 9.2% who were 65 years of age or older. The median age was 31 years. For every 100 females, there were 97.2 males. For every 100 females age 18 and over, there were 95.4 males.

The median income for a household in the city was $31,685, and the median income for a family was $37,663. Males had a median income of $28,226 versus $20,951 for females. The per capita income for the city was $12,591. About 13.0% of families and 17.0% of the population were below the poverty line, including 20.1% of those under age 18 and 8.1% of those age 65 or over.

== Economy ==
Heyburn's economy is largely influenced by its proximity to the cities of Burley and Twin Falls. The region's agricultural and food distribution sector is prominent. Heyburn is home to a Gem State Processing potato plant and the Double L harvest equipment manufacturer. Additionally, companies such the Packaging Corporation of America have seen employment rise as new businesses seek out their services.

== Education ==
Heyburn is served by the Minidoka County Schools system, with children attending Heyburn Elementary School, West Minico Middle School, Minico High School, and/or Mt. Harrison High School. Riverton Classical Academy, a public (tuition-free) charter school, is scheduled to open at the start of the 2027 school year.

== See also ==
- List of cities in Idaho
