= Vincent Hartgen =

American artist

Vincent Andrew Hartgen
- Born: January 10, 1914; Reading, Pennsylvania
- Died: November 27, 2002 (aged 88); Orono, Maine
- Known for: Collector, Teacher
- Spouse: Frances
- Children: 2 (including Stephen Hartgen)
- Relatives: Linda Wright Hartgen (daughter-in-law)
- Awards: Black Bear Award; Distinguished Professor Award
- Website: Official site

Vincent Andrew Hartgen (January 10, 1914 – November 27, 2002) was an American artist.

== Biography ==
=== Early life ===
Hartgen was born in 1914 in Reading, Pennsylvania, the son of William and Jane (Hadfield) Hartgen. He earned a master's degree in fine arts from the University of Pennsylvania where he also used to study architecture. When World War II began he joined the U.S. Army Camouflage Corps. Later on, he married Frances Lubanda, a United States Weather Bureau worker.

=== Teaching career ===
After the war he worked as a teacher at the University of Maine. During his History of Art class, he made a point of showing his students the difficulties which Michelangelo had when he was painting the Sistine Chapel: Professor Hartgen would lie down on the table at the front of the classroom and hold a clipboard just inches away from his nose. He also showed his art in summer on the yard of his Orono home.

=== Collecting ===
As a collector he collected 5,000 art pieces which were painted by such famous artists as Berenice Abbott, Jasper Johns, John Marin, Diego Rivera, Giovanni Piranesi, Käthe Kollwitz, and Andrew Wyeth. He has collections in such museums as the Beaux-Arts Institute of Design, the Walker Art Center, the Brooklyn Museum, the Metropolitan Museum of Art, the De Cordova Museum, the Museum of Fine Arts, Boston, and Chase Gallery. He served as museum director for 36 years at the University of Maine Museum of Art. He died on November 27, 2002. During his life he was awarded with such awards as the Black Bear Award, the Distinguished Professor Award and an even became an honorary doctor of fine arts at the University of Maine. He was also a founder of the Vincent A. Hartgen Award which was established in 1999. He was the father of Stephen Hartgen.
