= Linda Wright Hartgen =

American politician from Idaho

Member of the Idaho Senate from the 25th district
- In office December 1, 2022 – November 30, 2024
- Preceded by: Jim Patrick (redistricting)
- Succeeded by: Josh Kohl

Member of the Idaho House of Representatives from the District 24 Seat B district
- In office December 1, 2018 – November 30, 2022
- Preceded by: Stephen Hartgen
- Succeeded by: Steve Miller (redistricting)

Personal details
- Born: March 21, 1949 (age 77)
- Party: Republican
- Spouse: Stephen Hartgen (m. 1992; died 2021)
- Relations: Vincent Hartgen (father-in-law)
- Children: 3
- Education: Lewis–Clark State College (BS)

Linda Wright Hartgen (née Gardner) (born March 21, 1949) is an American politician. A member of the Republican Party, she has served in the Idaho Senate since 2022. She was previously a member of the Idaho House of Representatives for District 24, seat B.

== Education ==
In 1991, Hartgen earned a Bachelor of Science in business management from Lewis–Clark State College.

== Career ==
In 1991, Hartgen became a court clerk, until 1992. From 1992 to 2015, she was a trial court administrator at the Idaho Supreme Court.

On November 6, 2018, Hartgen won the election and became a Republican member of Idaho House of Representatives for District 24, seat B. Hartgen defeated Deborah Silver and Anthony Tomkins with 57.7% of the votes.

Hartgen has announced that she will be running for the seat of retiring state senator Lee Heider, from District 24.

== Personal life ==
Hartgen's husband was Stephen Hartgen who died on 31 December 2021. She has three children. Hartgen and her family live in Twin Falls, Idaho.
