= Stephen Hartgen =

American politician (1944–2021)

Member of the Idaho House of Representatives
- In office July 2008 – November 30, 2018
- Preceded by: Bert Brackett
- Succeeded by: Linda Wright Hartgen
- Constituency: 23rd district Seat B (2008–2012); 24th district Seat B (2012–2018)

Personal details
- Born: Stephen Anthony Hartgen; September 30, 1944 Baltimore, Maryland, U.S.
- Died: December 31, 2021 (aged 77) Twin Falls, Idaho, U.S.
- Party: Republican
- Spouse: Linda Gardner (m. 1992)
- Relations: Vincent Hartgen (father)
- Education: Amherst College; Brandeis University; University of Minnesota
- Profession: Business consultant
- Website: stephenhartgen.com

Stephen Anthony Hartgen (September 30, 1944 – December 31, 2021) was an American politician who was a member of the Idaho House of Representatives, serving from 2008 to 2018. He was a member of the Republican Party.

== Personal life and death ==
Hartgen was born in Baltimore, Maryland, on September 30, 1944, as the son of artist and University of Maine professor Vincent Hartgen. He earned his bachelor's degree in history from Amherst College, his master's in American history from Brandeis University, and his doctorate in American history from the University of Minnesota.

He died on December 31, 2021, at the age of 77.

== Career ==
Hartgen was a business consultant and a former editor and publisher of the Times-News.

In July 2008, after the death of Senator Tom Gannon, the Legislative District 23 Republican Central Committee met to fill the vacancy in the Idaho Senate seat and replace Gannon's name on the upcoming general election ballot. The committee selected then-Representative Bert Brackett of Rogerson to replace Gannon's name on the ballot and sent three names in order of preference to Governor Butch Otter to fill the vacancy: Brackett, Hartgen, and Jeanne Gannon of Buhl, the widow of Senator Gannon. Otter appointed Brackett to serve the remainder of Gannon's term. The committee met again to fill the vacancy in the Idaho House of Representatives from Brackett's appointment to the Senate and replace Brackett's name for representative on the upcoming general election ballot. The committee selected Hartgen to replace Brackett's name on the ballot for Representative and sent three names in order of preference to Otter to fill the vacancy: Hartgen, former Representative Gene Winchester, of Homedale, and Doran Parkins, of Marsing. Otter appointed Hartgen to serve the remainder of Brackett's term in the House.

=== Committee assignments ===
- Commerce and Human Resources Committee (chairman)
- Environment, Energy, and Technology Committee
- Revenue and Taxation Committee

Hartgen previously served on the Education Committee from 2008 to 2012.

== Elections ==
District 23 House Seat B - Owyhee County and part of Twin Falls County
| Year | Candidate | Votes | Pct | Candidate | Votes | Pct |
|---|---|---|---|---|---|---|
| 2008 General | Stephen Hartgen (incumbent) | 9,951 | 64.8% | Mike Ihler | 5,413 | 35.2% |
| 2010 Primary | Stephen Hartgen (incumbent) | 3,881 | 100% | | | |
| 2010 General | Stephen Hartgen (incumbent) | 7,496 | 68.4% | Bill Chisholm | 3,465 | 31.6% |

District 24 House Seat B - Part of Twin Falls County
| Year | Candidate | Votes | Pct | Candidate | Votes | Pct |
|---|---|---|---|---|---|---|
| 2012 Primary | Stephen Hartgen (incumbent) | 2,932 | 100% | | | |
| 2012 General | Stephen Hartgen (incumbent) | 9,202 | 59.9% | Rosemary Fornshell | 6,164 | 40.1% |
| 2014 Primary | Stephen Hartgen (incumbent) | 2,699 | 100% | | | |
| 2014 General | Stephen Hartgen (incumbent) | 5,587 | 53.5% | Catherine Talkington | 4,850 | 46.5% |
| 2016 Primary | Stephen Hartgen (incumbent) | 2,103 | 59.0% | Mary Bello | 1,462 | 41.0% |
| 2016 General | Stephen Hartgen (incumbent) | 10,161 | 61.3% | Catherine Talkington | 6,422 | 38.7% |
