= Kimama, Idaho =

- populated place
- Location within Idaho Location within the United States
- Coordinates: 42°50′17″N 113°47′44″W
- Country: United States
- State: Idaho
- County: Lincoln
- Elevation: 4,272 ft (1,302 m)
- Time zone: UTC-7 (Mountain (MST))
  - Summer (DST): UTC-6 (MDT)
- GNIS feature ID: 396741

Kimama is a populated place in Lincoln County, Idaho, United States. Kimama is located on State Highway 24 between Deitrich and Minidoka.

There is a Bureau of Land Management (Twin Falls District) fire station in Kimama.

Kimama is about 3 miles north of a volcanic hill called The Crater, and about 7 miles northeast of the larger volcanic butte called Kimama Butte. The Shale Butte Wilderness Study Area is north of Kimama.
