= Jackson, Idaho =

Unincorporated community in Idaho, United States

- Unincorporated community
- Location within Idaho Location within the United States
- Coordinates: 42°38′02″N 113°34′14″W
- Country: United States
- State: Idaho
- County: Minidoka and Cassia
- Elevation: 4,163 ft (1,269 m)
- Time zone: UTC-7 (Mountain (MST))
  - Summer (DST): UTC-6 (MDT)
- ZIP codes: 83350
- Area codes: 208, 986
- GNIS feature ID: 376163

Jackson is an unincorporated community in Minidoka County and Cassia County in the U.S. state of Idaho. The community is located 4 mi (6.4 km) east of Rupert and 13 mi (21 km) northeast of Burley. The Snake River flows immediately northwest of Jackson.

== History ==
Jackson's population was 25 in 1909.
