= Minidoka, Idaho =

- City
- Location in Minidoka County, Idaho
- Coordinates: 42°45′14″N 113°29′24″W
- Country: United States
- State: Idaho
- County: Minidoka

Area
  - Total: 0.10 sq mi (0.26 km^{2})
  - Land: 0.10 sq mi (0.26 km^{2})
  - Water: 0.00 sq mi (0 km^{2})
- Elevation: 4,282 ft (1,305 m)

Population (2020)
  - Total: 86
  - Density: 819/sq mi (316/km^{2})
- Time zone: UTC-7 (Mountain (MST))
  - Summer (DST): UTC-6 (MDT)
- ZIP code: 83343
- Area codes: 208, 986
- FIPS code: 16-53110
- GNIS feature ID: 2411121

Minidoka is a city in Minidoka County, Idaho, United States. The population was 86 at the 2020 census, down from 112 in 2010. It is part of the Burley, Idaho Micropolitan Statistical Area.

Over two thirds of the population of Minidoka identify as Hispanic or Latino.

== Geography ==
Minidoka is in eastern Minidoka County, 13 miles (21 km) northeast of Rupert, the county seat, and 50 miles (80 km) east-southeast of Shoshone by Idaho State Highway 24. According to the United States Census Bureau, the city has a total area of 0.11 square miles (0.28 km^{2}), all of it land.

=== Climate ===
According to the Köppen Climate Classification system, Minidoka has a cold semi-arid climate, abbreviated "BSk" on climate maps. The hottest temperature recorded in Minidoka was 108 °F (42.2 °C) on July 12, 2002, while the coldest temperature recorded was −41 °F (−40.6 °C) on January 22, 1962.

Climate data for Minidoka Dam, Idaho, 1991–2020 normals, extremes 1947–present
Month	Jan	Feb	Mar	Apr	May	Jun	Jul	Aug	Sep	Oct	Nov	Dec	Year
Record high °F (°C)	65 (18)	69 (21)	78 (26)	94 (34)	100 (38)	105 (41)	108 (42)	105 (41)	103 (39)	97 (36)	79 (26)	67 (19)	108 (42)
Mean maximum °F (°C)	49.4 (9.7)	56.6 (13.7)	70.0 (21.1)	80.0 (26.7)	87.4 (30.8)	95.2 (35.1)	100.9 (38.3)	99.3 (37.4)	94.2 (34.6)	83.2 (28.4)	66.7 (19.3)	52.8 (11.6)	102.0 (38.9)
Mean daily maximum °F (°C)	36.7 (2.6)	42.2 (5.7)	52.9 (11.6)	60.3 (15.7)	70.2 (21.2)	79.2 (26.2)	89.4 (31.9)	88.2 (31.2)	78.1 (25.6)	64.4 (18.0)	49.3 (9.6)	37.3 (2.9)	62.4 (16.8)
Daily mean °F (°C)	27.6 (−2.4)	31.8 (−0.1)	40.3 (4.6)	46.5 (8.1)	55.6 (13.1)	63.5 (17.5)	71.7 (22.1)	70.3 (21.3)	61.2 (16.2)	49.4 (9.7)	37.5 (3.1)	28.1 (−2.2)	48.6 (9.3)
Mean daily minimum °F (°C)	18.4 (−7.6)	21.5 (−5.8)	27.7 (−2.4)	32.6 (0.3)	40.9 (4.9)	47.8 (8.8)	54.0 (12.2)	52.4 (11.3)	44.3 (6.8)	34.4 (1.3)	25.7 (−3.5)	19.0 (−7.2)	34.9 (1.6)
Mean minimum °F (°C)	−0.6 (−18.1)	4.7 (−15.2)	14.3 (−9.8)	20.1 (−6.6)	27.6 (−2.4)	35.4 (1.9)	43.2 (6.2)	40.2 (4.6)	32.1 (0.1)	18.5 (−7.5)	8.4 (−13.1)	0.0 (−17.8)	−7.0 (−21.7)
Record low °F (°C)	−41 (−41)	−29 (−34)	−7 (−22)	12 (−11)	15 (−9)	24 (−4)	31 (−1)	31 (−1)	19 (−7)	−8 (−22)	−19 (−28)	−26 (−32)	−41 (−41)
Average precipitation inches (mm)	1.15 (29)	0.76 (19)	0.85 (22)	0.99 (25)	1.34 (34)	0.72 (18)	0.16 (4.1)	0.33 (8.4)	0.68 (17)	0.78 (20)	0.86 (22)	1.18 (30)	9.80 (249)
Average snowfall inches (cm)	6.7 (17)	4.2 (11)	1.2 (3.0)	0.5 (1.3)	0.0 (0.0)	0.0 (0.0)	0.0 (0.0)	0.0 (0.0)	0.0 (0.0)	0.7 (1.8)	2.6 (6.6)	4.6 (12)	20.5 (52.7)
Average precipitation days (≥ 0.01 in)	8.7	6.7	6.2	6.9	6.9	4.4	1.7	2.6	3.7	4.9	5.8	7.6	66.1
Average snowy days (≥ 0.1 in)	4.8	3.0	1.1	0.3	0.0	0.0	0.0	0.0	0.0	0.2	1.3	3.4	14.1
Source 1: NOAA
Source 2: National Weather Service

== Demographics ==
Historical population
Census	Pop.	Note	%±
1910	45		—
1920	253		462.2%
1930	193		−23.7%
1940	174		−9.8%
1950	113		−35.1%
1960	154		36.3%
1970	131		−14.9%
1980	101		−22.9%
1990	67		−33.7%
2000	129		92.5%
2010	112		−13.2%
2020	86		−23.2%
U.S. Decennial Census

=== 2010 census ===
As of the census of 2010, there were 112 people, 30 households, and 28 families residing in the city. The population density was 1,018.2 inhabitants per square mile (393.1/km^{2}). There were 43 housing units at an average density of 390.9 per square mile (150.9/km^{2}). The racial makeup of the city was 46.4% White, 42.0% from other races, and 11.6% from two or more races. Hispanic or Latino of any race were 76.8% of the population.

There were 30 households, of which 50.0% had children under the age of 18 living with them, 83.3% were married couples living together, 3.3% had a female householder with no husband present, 6.7% had a male householder with no wife present, and 6.7% were non-families. 3.3% of all households were made up of individuals, and 3.3% had someone living alone who was 65 years of age or older. The average household size was 3.73 and the average family size was 3.50.

The median age in the city was 30.3 years. 29.5% of residents were under the age of 18; 12.4% were between the ages of 18 and 24; 25% were from 25 to 44; 21.5% were from 45 to 64; and 11.6% were 65 years of age or older. The gender makeup of the city was 51.8% male and 48.2% female.

=== 2000 census ===
As of the census of 2000, there were 129 people, 35 households, and 29 families residing in the city. The population density was 1,492.4 inhabitants per square mile (576.2/km^{2}). There were 43 housing units at an average density of 497.5 per square mile (192.1/km^{2}). The racial makeup of the city was 31.01% White, 1.55% Asian, 64.34% from other races, and 3.10% from two or more races. Hispanic or Latino of any race were 77.52% of the population.

There were 35 households, out of which 62.9% had children under the age of 18 living with them, 71.4% were married couples living together, 5.7% had a female householder with no husband present, and 14.3% were non-families. 14.3% of all households were made up of individuals, and 5.7% had someone living alone who was 65 years of age or older. The average household size was 3.69 and the average family size was 4.03.

In the city, the population was spread out, with 41.1% under the age of 18, 13.2% from 18 to 24, 24.0% from 25 to 44, 17.8% from 45 to 64, and 3.9% who were 65 years of age or older. The median age was 23 years. For every 100 females, there were 130.4 males. For every 100 females age 18 and over, there were 117.1 males.

The median income for a household in the city was $21,250, and the median income for a family was $24,063. Males had a median income of $17,813 versus $11,250 for females. The per capita income for the city was $5,727. There were 27.6% of families and 31.7% of the population living below the poverty line, including 33.3% of under eighteens and none of those over 64.

== Education ==
Minidoka is served by the Minidoka County Schools system. Students are zoned to:

- Acequia Elementary School in Acequia
- East Minico Middle School in Rupert
- Minico High School in unincorporated Minidoka County

== Infrastructure ==
=== Transportation ===
Minidoka is located on State Highway 24, which travels southwest to Rupert and northwest to Shoshone.

== See also ==
- Minidoka National Historic Site, former Japanese American internment camp in Jerome County
