= Magic Valley =

Coordinates: 43°N 114°W

- Region
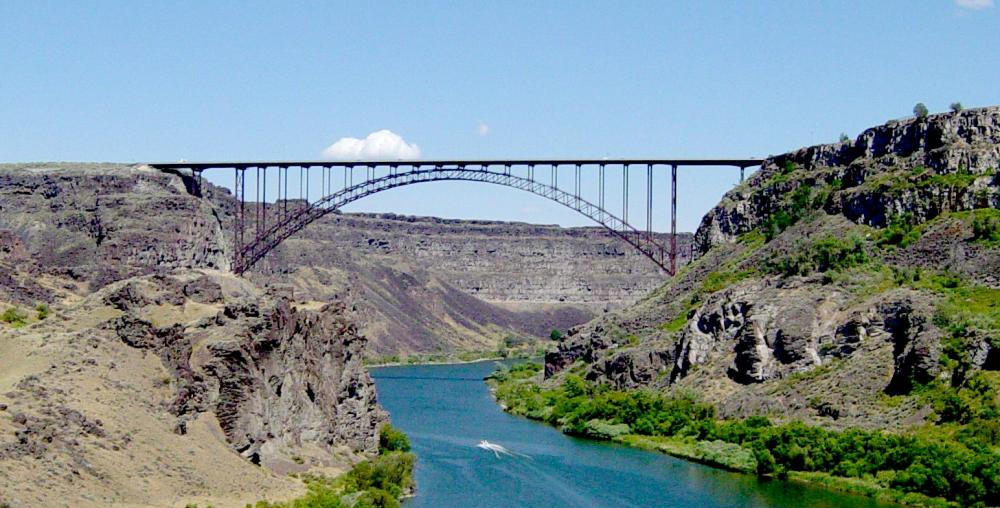
- Perrine Bridge spanning the Snake River Canyon at Twin Falls.

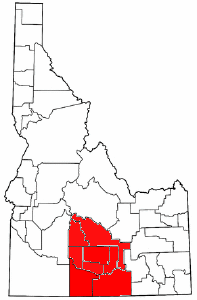
- Map of Idaho highlighting counties in the Magic Valley region.
- Country: United States
- State: Idaho
- Largest city: Twin Falls (pop.: 44,125)

Population (2010)
  - Total: 185,790
- Time zone: UTC−7 (Mountain)
  - Summer (DST): UTC−6 (MDT)
- Area codes: 208, 986

The Magic Valley, also known as South Central Idaho, is a region in south-central Idaho constituting Blaine, Camas, Cassia, Gooding, Jerome, Lincoln, Minidoka, and Twin Falls counties. It is particularly associated with the agricultural region in the Snake River Plain located in the area. The northern Magic Valley region — particularly Blaine and Camas Counties — is also known as the Wood River Valley after the Big Wood River.

== Demographics ==
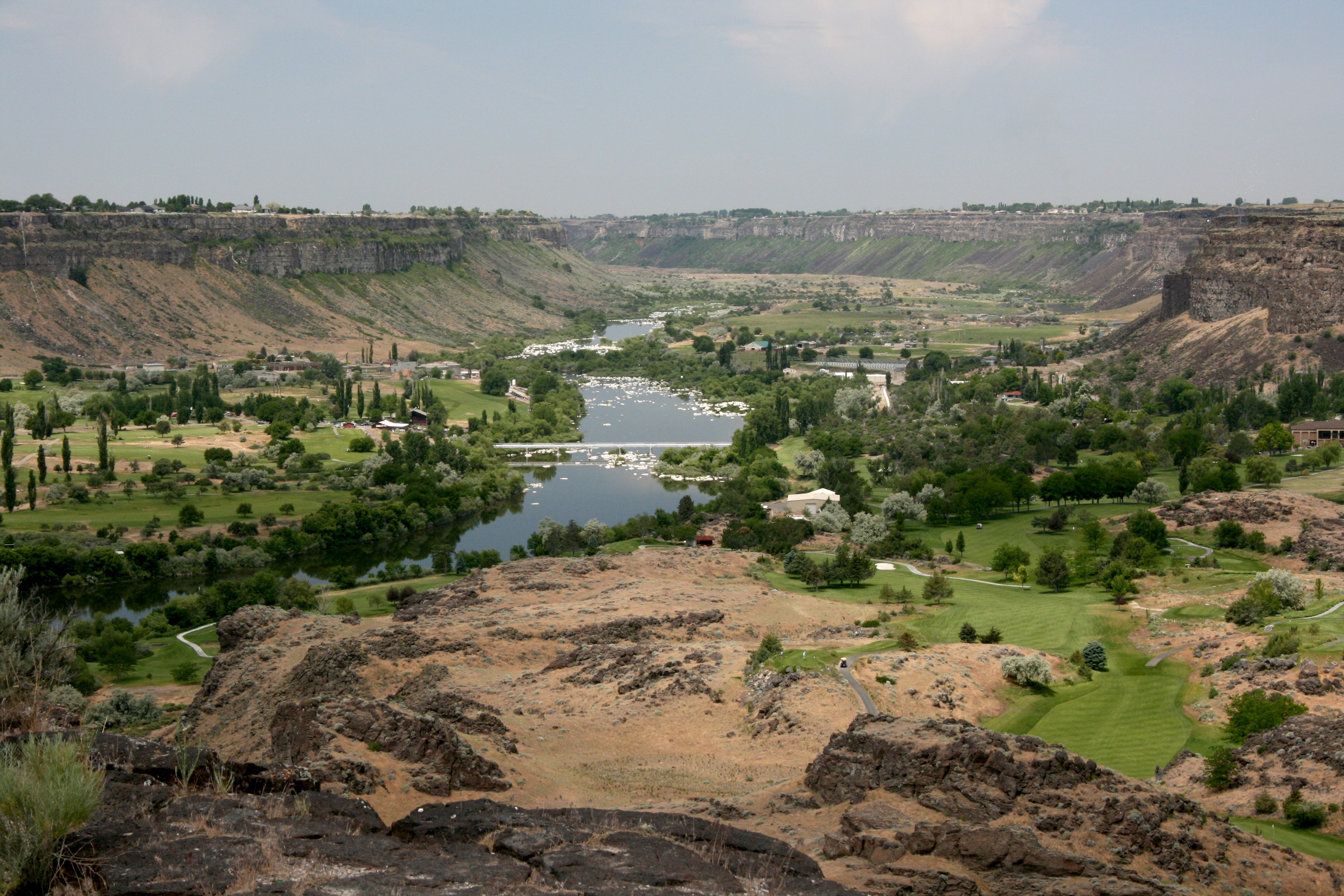
View of the Magic Valley

According to the 2010 Census the counties of the Magic Valley region had a combined population of 185,790, or nearly 12% of Idaho. Twin Falls is the region's largest city and metropolitan area. Burley is the principal city of the region's other micropolitan area. Other cities include Jerome, Rupert, Gooding, Wendell, Bliss, Hagerman and Hailey.

== History ==
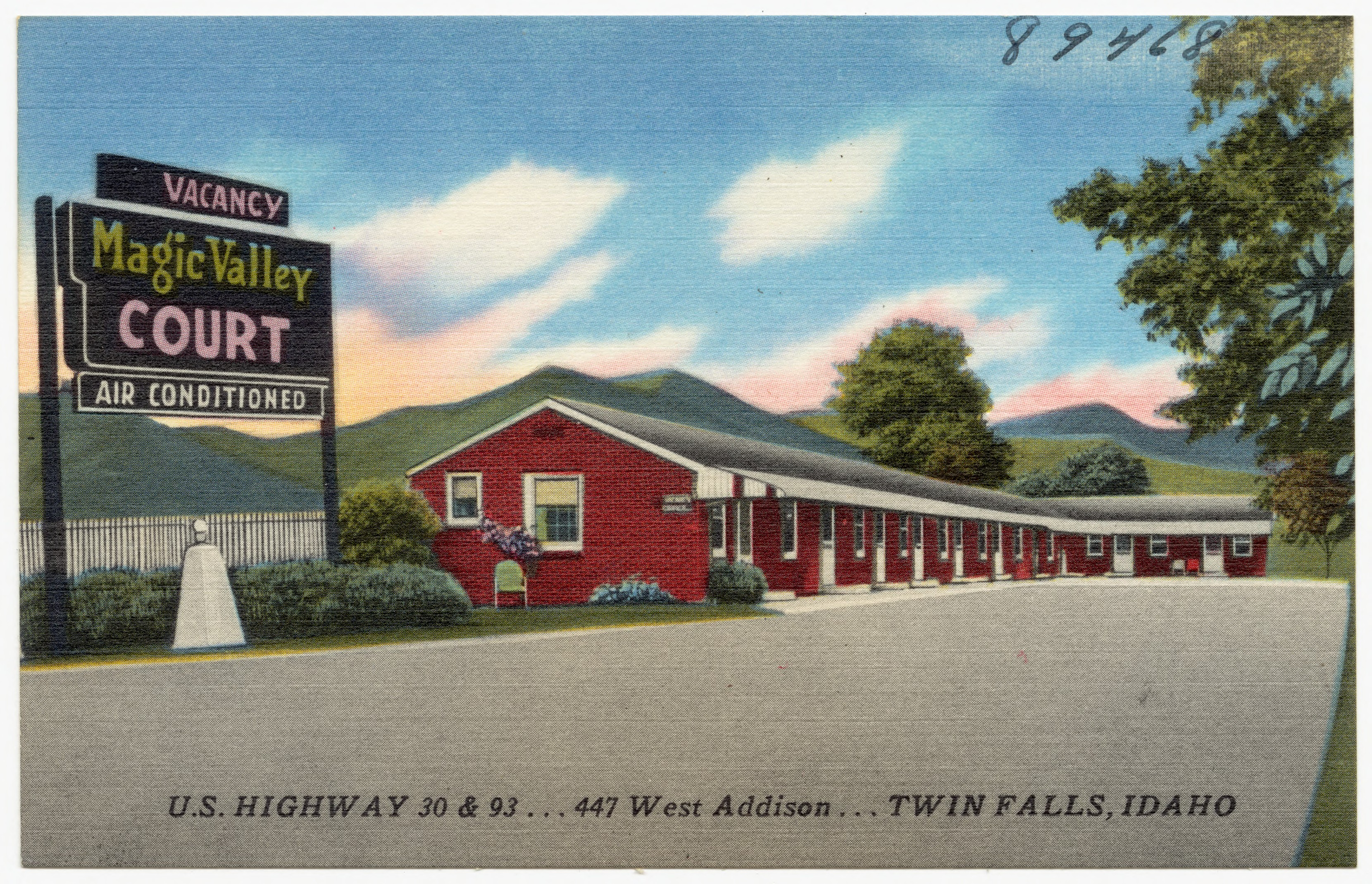
Magic Valley Court, a motel in Twin Falls.

The name "Magic Valley" is a reference to the construction of Milner and Minidoka Dams and a series of irrigation canal systems (such as the Gooding Milner canal) on the Snake River during the first decade of the 20th century. In a short time these projects "magically" transformed what had been considered a nearly uninhabitable area into some of the most productive farmland in the northwestern U.S. Many cities and towns in the region were founded between 1900 and 1910 as a direct result of these projects.

Annie Pike Greenwood wrote We Sagebrush Folks, an autobiography published in 1934 about the challenges of farm life in the area.

== Education ==
The College of Southern Idaho (CSI) in Twin Falls is the Magic Valley's only college. Most of the region's cities and towns support separate public school districts.

== Culture ==
Cultural events are routinely held at CSI. County fairs are held throughout the region in the late summer, the largest being the Twin Falls County Fair in Filer during the week immediately preceding Labor Day. The Sun Valley resort in Blaine County hosts several attractions throughout the year. The town of Hagerman hosts a large blues fest in September.

The Magic Valley is home to the Magic Valley Arts Council, a non-profit umbrella arts organization that serves the greater Twin Falls area and surrounding 8-county Magic Valley region. The organization's mission is to foster and promote experiences in the arts for all people in the Greater Twin Falls. It is an association of arts organizations, individuals, educational institutions and businesses looking for opportunities to improve the quality of life in the Magic Valley area by providing arts and cultural opportunities. Annual events and programs include Kids Art in the Park, Arts on Tour, Brown Bag Lecture Series, theatrical productions, the Full Moon Gallery of Fine Art and Contemporary Craft, public art projects and many others.

== Leisure ==
Popular leisure activities in the Magic Valley include camping, hunting and fishing. Skiing at several resorts throughout the region is one of the most popular winter activities. Jackpot, Nevada, which is closely associated with the Magic Valley region, offers casino gaming. The Perrine Bridge draws many BASE jumpers from around the world. It is the only man-made structure in the US that is legally jumpable without a permit.

== Agriculture ==
Important agricultural commodities in the Magic Valley include rainbow trout, beans, sugar beets, corn (maize) and potatoes. Dairy production is also significant, especially in Jerome and Gooding Counties.

== Cities and towns ==
- Acequia
- Albion
- Bellevue
- Bliss
- Buhl
- Burley
- Carey
- Castleford
- Declo
- Dietrich
- Eden
- Fairfield
- Filer
- Gooding
- Hagerman
- Hailey
- Hansen
- Hazelton
- Heyburn
- Hollister
- Jerome
- Ketchum
- Kimberly
- Malta
- Minidoka
- Murtaugh
- Oakley
- Paul
- Picabo
- Richfield
- Rogerson
- Rupert
- Shoshone
- Sun Valley
- Triumph
- Twin Falls
- Wendell

== Notable people ==
- Colston Loveland (born 2004), professional American football player. He grew up in Bliss, Idaho, a small community in Gooding County, and attended Gooding High School. Loveland played college football at the University of Michigan, where he was part of the 2023 national championship team. Known for carrying his small-town Idaho roots with pride, he became the highest-drafted tight end of the 2025 NFL draft when he was selected 10th overall by the Chicago Bears.

== See also ==
- Sun Valley
- Treasure Valley
