= Paul, Idaho =

Paul
- City
- Location in Minidoka County, Idaho
- Coordinates: 42°36′19″N 113°47′05″W
- Country: United States
- State: Idaho
- County: Minidoka
- Founded: 1907
- Incorporated: 1907

Area
  - Total: 0.69 sq mi (1.78 km^{2})
  - Land: 0.66 sq mi (1.71 km^{2})
  - Water: 0.027 sq mi (0.07 km^{2})
- Elevation: 4,154 ft (1,266 m)

Population (2020)
  - Total: 1,195
  - Estimate (2022): 1,728
  - Density: 2,620/sq mi (1,013/km^{2})
- Time zone: UTC–7 (Mountain (MST))
  - Summer (DST): UTC–6 (MDT)
- ZIP Code: 83347
- Area codes: 208 and 986
- FIPS code: 16-61210
- GNIS feature ID: 2411386
- Website: cityofpaul.org

Paul is a city in Minidoka County, Idaho, United States. The population was 1,195 at the 2020 census. It is part of the Burley, Idaho Micropolitan Statistical Area.

== History ==
Paul was founded in 1907. The town received its name from Charles H. Paul, an engineer who worked on the Minidoka Project.

== Geography ==
Paul is in southern Minidoka County, 6 miles (10 km) west of Rupert, the county seat, and 5 miles (8 km) north of Burley. Idaho State Highway 25 passes east-west through the city, and State Highway 27 leads south from the city center.

According to the United States Census Bureau, Paul has a total area of 0.69 square miles (1.79 km^{2}), of which 0.03 square miles (0.08 km^{2}), or 4.08%, are water.

== Demographics ==
Historical population
Census	Pop.	Note	%±
1920	527		—
1930	363		−31.1%
1940	606		66.9%
1950	560		−7.6%
1960	701		25.2%
1970	911		30.0%
1980	940		3.2%
1990	901		−4.1%
2000	998		10.8%
2010	1,169		17.1%
2020	1,195		2.2%
2022 (est.)	1,728		44.6%
U.S. Decennial Census; 2020 Census

=== 2020 census ===
As of the 2020 census, Paul had a population of 1,195. The median age was 35.5 years. 27.5% of residents were under the age of 18 and 18.2% of residents were 65 years of age or older. For every 100 females there were 103.9 males, and for every 100 females age 18 and over there were 100.9 males age 18 and over.

100.0% of residents lived in urban areas, while 0.0% lived in rural areas.

There were 435 households in Paul, of which 39.1% had children under the age of 18 living in them. Of all households, 53.6% were married-couple households, 18.4% were households with a male householder and no spouse or partner present, and 20.7% were households with a female householder and no spouse or partner present. About 22.8% of all households were made up of individuals and 12.6% had someone living alone who was 65 years of age or older.

There were 475 housing units, of which 8.4% were vacant. The homeowner vacancy rate was 1.9% and the rental vacancy rate was 6.1%.

Racial composition as of the 2020 census
Race	Number	Percent
White	750	62.8%
Black or African American	0	0.0%
American Indian and Alaska Native	18	1.5%
Asian	1	0.1%
Native Hawaiian and Other Pacific Islander	4	0.3%
Some other race	297	24.9%
Two or more races	125	10.5%
Hispanic or Latino (of any race)	477	39.9%

=== 2010 census ===
As of the 2010 census, there were 1,169 people, 446 households, and 311 families residing in the city. The population density was 1,826.6 inhabitants per square mile (705.3/km^{2}). There were 473 housing units at an average density of 739.1 per square mile (285.4/km^{2}). The racial makeup of the city was 76.6% White, 0.9% Native American, 0.8% Asian, 18.0% from other races, and 3.6% from two or more races. Hispanic or Latino of any race were 28.5% of the population.

There were 446 households, of which 34.3% had children under the age of 18 living with them, 56.7% were married couples living together, 7.4% had a female householder with no husband present, 5.6% had a male householder with no wife present, and 30.3% were non-families. 26.7% of all households were made up of individuals, and 13.9% had someone living alone who was 65 years of age or older. The average household size was 2.62 and the average family size was 3.20.

The median age in the city was 34.3 years. 28.7% of residents were under the age of 18; 7.2% were between the ages of 18 and 24; 24.7% were from 25 to 44; 23.5% were from 45 to 64; and 16% were 65 years of age or older. The gender makeup of the city was 51.3% male and 48.7% female.

=== 2000 census ===
As of the 2000 census, there were 998 people, 409 households, and 276 families residing in the city. The population density was 1,559.4 inhabitants per square mile (602.1/km^{2}). There were 430 housing units at an average density of 671.9 per square mile (259.4/km^{2}). The racial makeup of the city was 83.27% White, 0.10% African American, 0.80% Native American, 0.40% Asian, 12.22% from other races, and 3.21% from two or more races. Hispanic or Latino of any race were 16.33% of the population.

There were 409 households, out of which 31.3% had children under the age of 18 living with them, 54.0% were married couples living together, 8.6% had a female householder with no husband present, and 32.3% were non-families. 28.4% of all households were made up of individuals, and 17.6% had someone living alone who was 65 years of age or older. The average household size was 2.44 and the average family size was 2.99.

In the city, the population was spread out, with 27.3% under the age of 18, 7.3% from 18 to 24, 24.7% from 25 to 44, 22.2% from 45 to 64, and 18.4% who were 65 years of age or older. The median age was 39 years. For every 100 females, there were 94.9 males. For every 100 females age 18 and over, there were 90.1 males.

The median income for a household in the city was $30,417, and the median income for a family was $35,179. Males had a median income of $33,375 versus $21,172 for females. The per capita income for the city was $15,627. About 9.8% of families and 14.6% of the population were below the poverty line, including 19.3% of those under age 18 and 9.7% of those age 65 or over.

== Education ==
Paul is served by the Minidoka County Schools system.

Students are zoned to:

- Paul Elementary School (Paul)
- West Minico Middle School (unincorporated Minidoka County)
- Minico High School (unincorporated Minidoka County)

The county is in the catchment area, but not the taxation zone, for College of Southern Idaho.

The nearest libraries are in Burley and Rupert.

== See also ==
- Amalgamated Sugar Company
- Camp Rupert
