= Acequia, Idaho =

- City
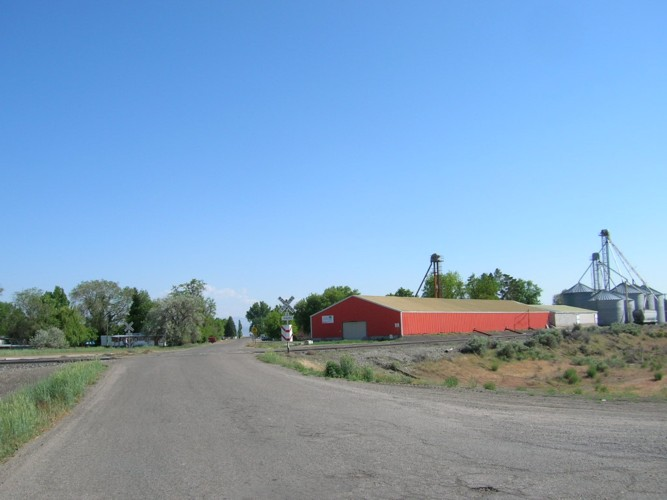
- Acequia (2006)

- Location of Acequia in Minidoka County, Idaho.
- Coordinates: 42°40′08″N 113°35′49″W
- Country: United States
- State: Idaho
- County: Minidoka

Area
  - Total: 0.54 sq mi (1.41 km^{2})
  - Land: 0.53 sq mi (1.38 km^{2})
  - Water: 0.012 sq mi (0.03 km^{2})
- Elevation: 4,167 ft (1,270 m)

Population (2020)
  - Total: 131
  - Density: 245.5/sq mi (94.77/km^{2})
- Time zone: UTC-7 (Mountain (MST))
  - Summer (DST): UTC-6 (MDT)
- ZIP code: 83350
- Area codes: 208, 986
- FIPS code: 16-00280
- GNIS feature ID: 2409658

Acequia (pronounced ah-SEE-kwa) is a city in Minidoka County, Idaho, United States. The population was 131 at the 2020 census. The town is named for the Spanish word for canal.

== Geography ==
Acequia is about 5 miles (8.3 kilometers) northeast of Rupert on State Highway 24.

According to the United States Census Bureau, the city has a total area of 0.43 square miles (1.11 km^{2}), of which, 0.42 square miles (1.09 km^{2}) is land and 0.01 square miles (0.03 km^{2}) is water.

== Demographics ==
Historical population
Census	Pop.	Note	%±
1960	107		—
1970	107		0.0%
1980	100		−6.5%
1990	106		6.0%
2000	144		35.8%
2010	124		−13.9%
2020	131		5.6%
U.S. Decennial Census

Acequia is part of the Burley, Idaho Micropolitan Statistical Area.

=== 2010 census ===
As of the census of 2010, there were 124 people, 43 households, and 33 families residing in the city. The population density was 295.2 inhabitants per square mile (114.0/km^{2}). There were 45 housing units at an average density of 107.1 per square mile (41.4/km^{2}). The racial makeup of the city was 66.9% White, 0.8% African American, 4.0% Native American, 23.4% from other races, and 4.8% from two or more races. Hispanic or Latino of any race were 43.5% of the population.

There were 43 households, of which 37.2% had children under the age of 18 living with them, 60.5% were married couples living together, 4.7% had a female householder with no husband present, 11.6% had a male householder with no wife present, and 23.3% were non-families. 16.3% of all households were made up of individuals, and 11.7% had someone living alone who was 65 years of age or older. The average household size was 2.88 and the average family size was 3.27.

The median age in the city was 36 years. 27.4% of residents were under the age of 18; 10.6% were between the ages of 18 and 24; 20.1% were from 25 to 44; 27.5% were from 45 to 64; and 14.5% were 65 years of age or older. The gender makeup of the city was 50.8% male and 49.2% female.

=== 2000 census ===
As of the census of 2000, there were 144 people, 48 households, and 38 families residing in the city. The population density was 467.1 inhabitants per square mile (180.3/km^{2}). There were 51 housing units at an average density of 165.4 per square mile (63.9/km^{2}). The racial makeup of the city was 58.33% White, 0.69% African American, 0.69% Native American, 0.69% Asian, 38.89% from other races, and 0.69% from two or more races. Hispanic or Latino of any race were 43.06% of the population.

There were 48 households, out of which 41.7% had children under the age of 18 living with them, 75.0% were married couples living together, 4.2% had a female householder with no husband present, and 20.8% were non-families. 18.8% of all households were made up of individuals, and 10.4% had someone living alone who was 65 years of age or older. The average household size was 3.00 and the average family size was 3.50.

In the city, the population was spread out, with 34.7% under the age of 18, 5.6% from 18 to 24, 27.1% from 25 to 44, 20.1% from 45 to 64, and 12.5% who were 65 years of age or older. The median age was 35 years. For every 100 females, there were 125.0 males. For every 100 females age 18 and over, there were 113.6 males.

The median income for a household in the city was $26,563, and the median income for a family was $24,375. Males had a median income of $22,500 versus $13,125 for females. The per capita income for the city was $10,430. There were 17.1% of families and 23.7% of the population living below the poverty line, including 40.8% of under eighteens and none of those over 64.

== Education ==
Acequia is served by the Minidoka County Schools system.

Children are zoned to:

- Acequia Elementary School (Acequia)
- East Minico Middle School (Rupert)
- Minico High School (Unincorporated Minidoka County)

The county is in the catchment area, but not the taxation zone, for College of Southern Idaho.
