= Minidoka County School District =

School district in Idaho, United States

Minidoka County Joint School District 331 is a school district headquartered in Rupert, Idaho. It was established in 1948.

The district's territory includes all of Minidoka County, as well as portions of Cassia, Jerome, and Lincoln counties. Students living in the rural Yale area in Blaine County's southeastern panhandle are sent to Minidoka County public schools. The Blaine County School District pays money to the Minidoka student to send the Yale students to Minidoka students. In 1994, there was bus transportation provided by both districts, with Acequia Elementary School in Acequia, operated by the Minidoka district, as the handoff point where the students switch drivers. In 1994, 16 students were sent from Blaine County to Minidoka County.

== History ==
In 2023, Spencer Larsen became the superintendent. He was previously the superintendent of the Gooding School District.

== Schools ==
High schools

- Minico High School
- Mt. Harrison High School

Middle schools (6-8)

- East Minico Middle School
- West Minico Middle School

Junior high schools (7-8)

- Minidoka Junior High School

Elementary schools

- Acequia Elementary School
- Heyburn Elementary School
- Paul Elementary School
- Rupert Elementary School

Preschool

- Minidoka Preschool Center
