= Minidoka County, Idaho =

County in Idaho, United States

- County
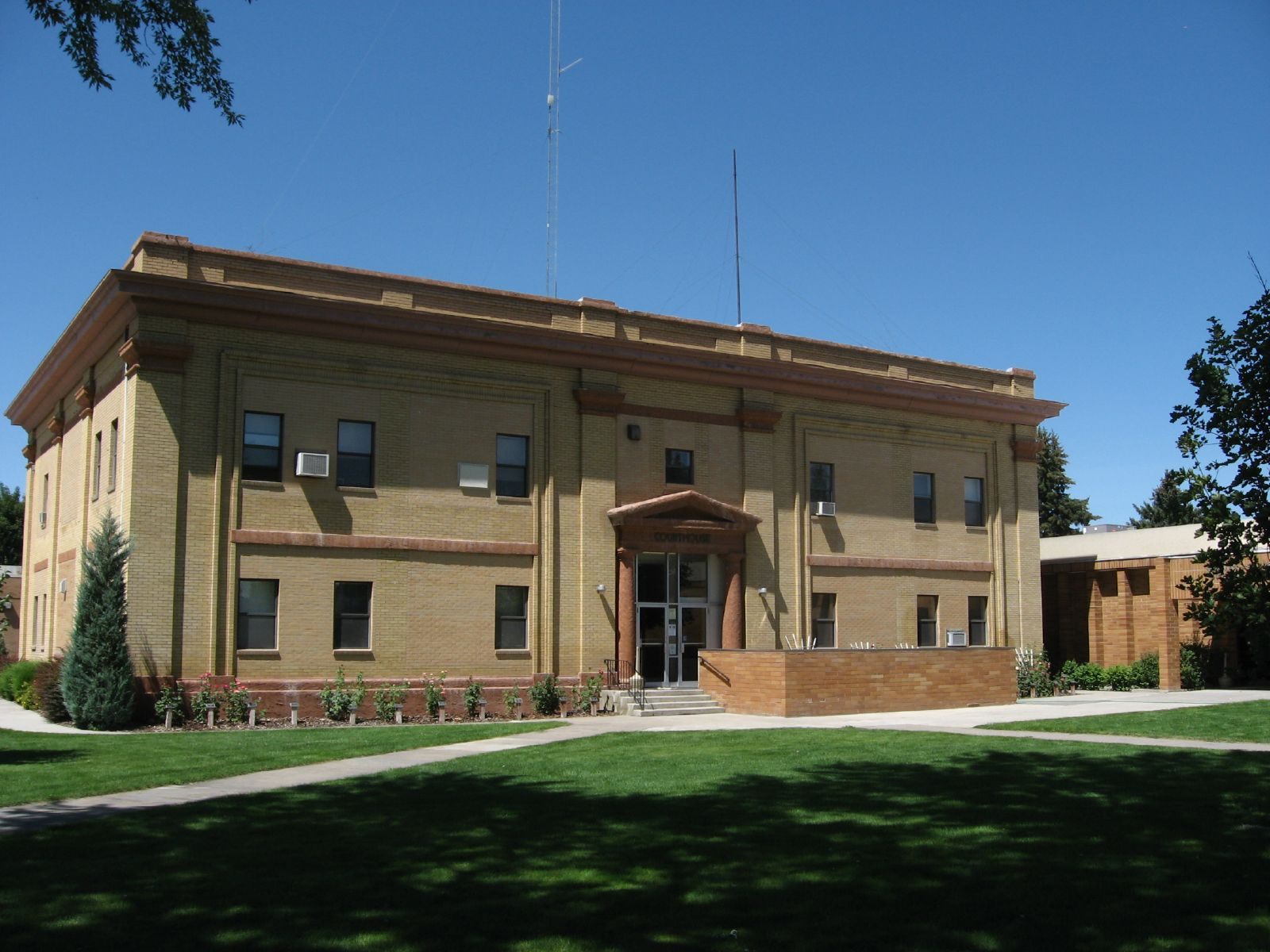
- Minidoka County Courthouse

- Seal

- Location within the U.S. state of Idaho
- Coordinates: 42°51′N 113°38′W
- Country: United States
- State: Idaho
- Founded: January 28, 1913
- Named for: Dakota Sioux word meaning "a fountain or spring of water."
- Seat: Rupert
- Largest city: Rupert

Area
  - Total: 763 sq mi (1,980 km^{2})
  - Land: 758 sq mi (1,960 km^{2})
  - Water: 5.3 sq mi (14 km^{2}) 0.7%

Population (2020)
  - Total: 21,613
  - Estimate (2025): 22,911 ▲
  - Density: 28.5/sq mi (11.0/km^{2})
- Time zone: UTC−7 (Mountain)
  - Summer (DST): UTC−6 (MDT)
- Congressional district: 2nd
- Website: www.minidoka.id.us

Minidoka County is a county located in the U.S. state of Idaho. As of the 2020 census, the population was 21,613. The county seat and largest city is Rupert.

Minidoka County is part of the Burley, ID Micropolitan Statistical Area.

== History ==
The name Minidoka is of Dakota Sioux origin meaning "a fountain or spring of water." Minidoka was first used in 1883 as a name for the Union Pacific's Oregon Short Line railroad spur in the middle of the Snake River Plain. The spur later became the site of a watering station along the line. The village of Minidoka grew up next to the station. The Minidoka name was then given to a reclamation project under then President Theodore Roosevelt which included the construction of the Minidoka Dam, constructed from 1904 to 1906. Minidoka National Historic Site (in adjacent Hunt of Jerome County), a World War II Japanese internment camp, was part of the original reclamation project and hence shares the name. Minidoka County was created by the Idaho Legislature on January 28, 1913, by a partition of Lincoln County.

Camp Rupert, west of Paul, was a prisoner of war (POW) camp during World War II.

== Geography ==
According to the U.S. Census Bureau, the county has a total area of 763 square miles (1,980 km^{2}), of which 758 square miles (1,960 km^{2}) is land and 5.3 square miles (14 km^{2}) (0.7%) is water.

It is part of the Magic Valley region of the Snake River Plain. Irrigated farmland covers the southern part of the county, while lava beds cover the northern portion. The elevation is generally in the range of 4,200 to 4,500 feet (1,300 to 1,400 m). The Snake River forms the county's southern boundary.

=== Adjacent counties ===
- Cassia County - south
- Jerome County - west
- Lincoln County - west
- Blaine County - north, east

=== National protected area ===
- Craters of the Moon National Monument and Preserve (part)
- Minidoka National Wildlife Refuge (part)

=== Highways ===
- Interstate 84
- US 30
- SH-24
- SH-25
- SH-27

== Demographics ==
Historical population
Census	Pop.	Note	%±
1920	9,035		—
1930	8,403		−7.0%
1940	9,870		17.5%
1950	9,785		−0.9%
1960	14,394		47.1%
1970	15,731		9.3%
1980	19,718		25.3%
1990	19,361		−1.8%
2000	20,174		4.2%
2010	20,069		−0.5%
2020	21,613		7.7%
2025 (est.)	22,911	▲	6.0%
U.S. Decennial Census; 1790–1960, 1900–1990, 1990–2000, 2010–2020 2020

=== Racial and ethnic composition ===
Minidoka County, Idaho – Racial and ethnic composition Note: the US Census treats Hispanic/Latino as an ethnic category. This table excludes Latinos from the racial categories and assigns them to a separate category. Hispanics/Latinos may be of any race.
Race / Ethnicity (NH = Non-Hispanic)	Pop 1980	Pop 1990	Pop 2000	Pop 2010	Pop 2020	% 1980	% 1990	% 2000	% 2010	% 2020
White alone (NH)	16,453	15,312	14,552	13,095	12,946	83.44%	79.09%	72.13%	65.25%	59.90%
Black or African American alone (NH)	14	29	38	44	27	0.07%	0.15%	0.19%	0.22%	0.12%
Native American or Alaska Native alone (NH)	131	171	123	146	92	0.66%	0.88%	0.61%	0.73%	0.43%
Asian alone (NH)	106	95	83	70	51	0.54%	0.49%	0.41%	0.35%	0.24%
Native Hawaiian or Pacific Islander alone (NH)	x	x	3	1	10	x	x	0.01%	0.00%	0.05%
Other race alone (NH)	25	19	16	21	57	0.13%	0.10%	0.08%	0.10%	0.26%
Mixed race or Multiracial (NH)	x	x	222	199	521	x	x	1.10%	0.99%	2.41%
Hispanic or Latino (any race)	2,989	3,735	5,137	6,493	7,909	15.16%	19.29%	25.46%	32.35%	36.59%
Total	19,718	19,361	20,174	20,069	21,613	100.00%	100.00%	100.00%	100.00%	100.00%

=== 2020 census ===
As of the 2020 census, the county had a population of 21,613. The median age was 35.2 years, with 28.8% of residents under the age of 18 and 15.9% aged 65 or older. For every 100 females there were 100.4 males, and for every 100 females age 18 and over there were 99.2 males.

The racial makeup of the county was 67.5% White, 0.2% Black or African American, 1.3% American Indian and Alaska Native, 0.3% Asian, 0.1% Native Hawaiian and Pacific Islander, 19.1% from some other race, and 11.6% from two or more races. Hispanic or Latino residents of any race comprised 36.6% of the population.

55.6% of residents lived in urban areas, while 44.4% lived in rural areas.

There were 7,654 households in the county, of which 37.5% had children under the age of 18 living with them and 21.5% had a female householder with no spouse or partner present. About 22.1% of all households were made up of individuals and 10.5% had someone living alone who was 65 years of age or older.

There were 8,218 housing units, of which 6.9% were vacant. Among occupied housing units, 70.6% were owner-occupied and 29.4% were renter-occupied. The homeowner vacancy rate was 1.3% and the rental vacancy rate was 5.8%.

=== 2010 census ===
At the 2010 census, there were 20,069 people, 7,170 households, and 5,315 families in the county. The population density was 26.5 inhabitants per square mile (10.2/km^{2}). There were 7,665 housing units at an average density of 10.1 per square mile (3.9/km^{2}). The racial makeup of the county was 80.2% white, 1.2% American Indian, 0.4% black or African American, 0.4% Asian, 15.3% from other races, and 2.4% from two or more races. Those of Hispanic or Latino origin made up 32.4% of the population. In terms of ancestry, 19.9% were German, 16.8% were English, 10.2% were American, and 6.5% were Irish.

Of the 7,170 households, 37.5% had children under the age of 18 living with them, 59.8% were married couples living together, 9.1% had a female householder with no husband present, 25.9% were non-families, and 22.0% of households were made up of individuals. The average household size was 2.79 and the average family size was 3.27. The median age was 35.3 years.

The median household income was $40,350 and the median family income was $47,079. Males had a median income of $32,895 versus $22,271 for females. The per capita income for the county was $17,747. About 9.4% of families and 13.1% of the population were below the poverty line, including 20.0% of those under age 18 and 7.4% of those age 65 or over.

=== 2000 census ===
At the 2000 census there were 20,176 people, 6,973 households, and 5,362 families in the county. The population density was 27 inhabitants per square mile (10/km^{2}). There were 7,498 housing units at an average density of 10 per square mile (3.9/km^{2}). The racial makeup of the county was 78.07% White, 0.26% Black or African American, 0.88% Native American, 0.42% Asian, 0.02% Pacific Islander, 17.83% from other races, and 2.52% from two or more races. 25.46%. were Hispanic or Latino of any race. 18.1% were of English, 12.9% German and 12.0% American ancestry.

Of the 6,973 households 38.90% had children under the age of 18 living with them, 64.40% were married couples living together, 8.20% had a female householder with no husband present, and 23.10% were non-families. 20.00% of households were one person and 9.60% were one person aged 65 or older. The average household size was 2.87 and the average family size was 3.32.

The age distribution was 31.60% under the age of 18, 9.10% from 18 to 24, 25.20% from 25 to 44, 20.90% from 45 to 64, and 13.20% 65 or older. The median age was 34 years. For every 100 females, there were 99.90 males. For every 100 females age 18 and over, there were 97.80 males.

The median household income was $32,021 and the median family income was $36,500. Males had a median income of $28,977 versus $19,521 for females. The per capita income for the county was $13,813. About 11.90% of families and 14.80% of the population were below the poverty line, including 18.90% of those under age 18 and 9.00% of those age 65 or over.

== Education ==
There is one school district in the county: Minidoka County Joint School District 331. The only public high school in the county is Minico High School near Rupert.

The county is in the catchment area, but not the taxation zone, for College of Southern Idaho.

== Communities ==
=== Cities ===
- Acequia
- Burley (part)
- Heyburn
- Minidoka
- Paul
- Rupert

=== Unincorporated communities ===
- Jackson (Extends into) Cassia County
- Kimama (Extends into) Lincoln County

=== Ghost towns ===
- Alturas, Idaho (Mostly in Blaine County)

== Politics ==
Like all of eastern Idaho, Minidoka County has been overwhelmingly Republican since the 1950s. The last Democratic presidential candidate to carry the county was Harry S. Truman in 1948, and the last to win a majority Franklin D. Roosevelt in 1940. In the 2024 election, Donald Trump gained more support than any other Republican presidential candidate in county history.

United States presidential election results for Minidoka County, Idaho
Year	Republican		Democratic		Third party(ies)	
Year	No.	%	No.	%	No.	%
1916	963	36.22%	1,135	42.69%	561	21.10%
1920	1,622	59.09%	1,107	40.33%	16	0.58%
1924	1,046	39.92%	204	7.79%	1,370	52.29%
1928	1,832	61.15%	1,132	37.78%	32	1.07%
1932	1,130	33.56%	2,164	64.27%	73	2.17%
1936	948	30.61%	2,095	67.65%	54	1.74%
1940	1,979	49.80%	1,982	49.87%	13	0.33%
1944	1,781	52.02%	1,635	47.75%	8	0.23%
1948	1,654	48.19%	1,668	48.60%	110	3.21%
1952	3,128	71.40%	1,253	28.60%	0	0.00%
1956	2,954	63.58%	1,692	36.42%	0	0.00%
1960	3,360	57.66%	2,467	42.34%	0	0.00%
1964	3,111	52.39%	2,827	47.61%	0	0.00%
1968	3,182	56.28%	1,332	23.56%	1,140	20.16%
1972	4,097	68.66%	1,423	23.85%	447	7.49%
1976	3,600	56.44%	2,441	38.27%	337	5.28%
1980	6,035	74.22%	1,689	20.77%	407	5.01%
1984	5,938	80.03%	1,398	18.84%	84	1.13%
1988	4,623	65.73%	2,290	32.56%	120	1.71%
1992	3,304	44.55%	1,815	24.47%	2,298	30.98%
1996	4,008	56.81%	1,977	28.02%	1,070	15.17%
2000	4,907	75.28%	1,344	20.62%	267	4.10%
2004	5,797	80.50%	1,331	18.48%	73	1.01%
2008	5,087	73.83%	1,630	23.66%	173	2.51%
2012	5,442	78.04%	1,390	19.93%	141	2.02%
2016	4,887	71.13%	1,167	16.98%	817	11.89%
2020	6,265	78.38%	1,550	19.39%	178	2.23%
2024	6,401	80.54%	1,373	17.27%	174	2.19%

== See also ==
- National Register of Historic Places listings in Minidoka County, Idaho
