= Rupert, Idaho =

- City
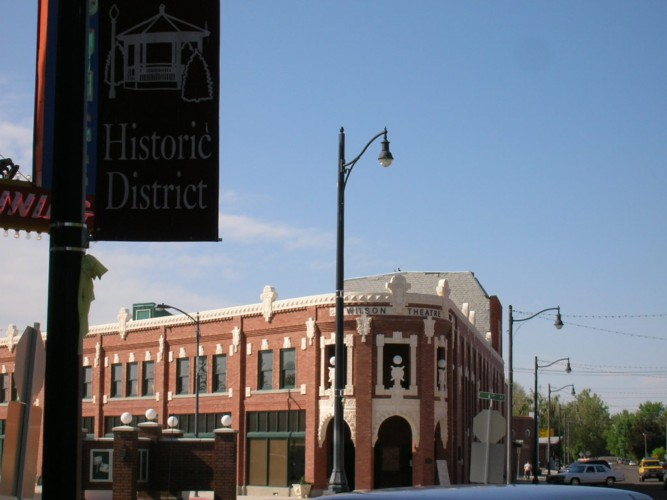
- Wilson Theatre in downtown Rupert in 2006

- Location in Minidoka County, Idaho

- Location in the contiguous United States
- Coordinates: 42°37′24″N 113°40′22″W
- Country: United States
- State: Idaho
- County: Minidoka

Area
  - Total: 2.06 sq mi (5.33 km^{2})
  - Land: 2.06 sq mi (5.33 km^{2})
  - Water: 0 sq mi (0.00 km^{2})
- Elevation: 4,157 ft (1,267 m)

Population (2020)
  - Total: 6,082
  - Density: 2,953.9/sq mi (1,140.5/km^{2})
- Time zone: UTC-7 (Mountain (MST))
  - Summer (DST): UTC-6 (MDT)
- ZIP codes: 83343, 83350
- Area codes: 208, 986
- FIPS code: 16-70660
- GNIS feature ID: 2411016
- Website: www.rupert-idaho.com

Rupert is the county seat and largest city of Minidoka County, Idaho, United States. It is part of the Burley Micropolitan Statistical Area. The population was 6,082 at the 2020 census, up from 5,554 in 2010.

== History ==
Rupert, founded in 1906, sprang up after the announcement of the Minidoka Reclamation Project, which provided irrigation and electricity following the completion of the Minidoka Dam on the Snake River in 1906. After the dam was built, Rupert became one of the first cities in the world to have its streets lit by electricity.

== Geography ==
Rupert is located in southern Minidoka County at an elevation of 4,157 feet (1,267 m) above sea level. It is part of the agricultural region of the Snake River Plain known as Magic Valley, and is 3 miles (5 km) northwest of the Snake River. Interstate 84 passes 5 miles (8 km) to the south, and before its construction, U.S. Route 30 passed through Rupert. Acequia lies about 5 miles (8 km) northeast of Rupert and Jackson is about 4 miles (6 km) east of Rupert on the Snake River of Minidoka County and Cassia County of Idaho and Paul is about the same distance to the west.

According to the United States Census Bureau, Rupert has a total area of 2.06 square miles (5.34 km^{2}), all of it land.

=== Climate ===
These data are from the Western Regional Climate Center, compiled over the years 1906 to 2002.

Climate data for Rupert, ID
| Month | Jan | Feb | Mar | Apr | May | Jun | Jul | Aug | Sep | Oct | Nov | Dec | Year |
|---|---|---|---|---|---|---|---|---|---|---|---|---|---|
| Record high °F (°C) | 61 (16) | 70 (21) | 79 (26) | 89 (32) | 99 (37) | 103 (39) | 104 (40) | 104 (40) | 99 (37) | 91 (33) | 82 (28) | 70 (21) | 104 (40) |
| Mean daily maximum °F (°C) | 34.5 (1.4) | 40.2 (4.6) | 50.6 (10.3) | 61.3 (16.3) | 69.7 (20.9) | 78.7 (25.9) | 88.1 (31.2) | 86.9 (30.5) | 76.6 (24.8) | 64.7 (18.2) | 48.1 (8.9) | 37.3 (2.9) | 61.4 (16.3) |
| Mean daily minimum °F (°C) | 14.3 (−9.8) | 19.8 (−6.8) | 26.1 (−3.3) | 32.3 (0.2) | 39.8 (4.3) | 47.0 (8.3) | 53.2 (11.8) | 50.9 (10.5) | 41.7 (5.4) | 33.0 (0.6) | 24.2 (−4.3) | 16.9 (−8.4) | 33.3 (0.7) |
| Record low °F (°C) | −34 (−37) | −31 (−35) | −8 (−22) | 5 (−15) | 20 (−7) | 30 (−1) | 34 (1) | 24 (−4) | 17 (−8) | 11 (−12) | −11 (−24) | −27 (−33) | −34 (−37) |
| Average precipitation inches (mm) | 1.08 (27) | 0.84 (21) | 0.90 (23) | 0.86 (22) | 1.03 (26) | 0.85 (22) | 0.35 (8.9) | 0.35 (8.9) | 0.57 (14) | 0.79 (20) | 0.95 (24) | 0.97 (25) | 9.54 (241.8) |
| Average snowfall inches (cm) | 7.3 (19) | 4.2 (11) | 2.4 (6.1) | 0.8 (2.0) | 0.2 (0.51) | 0 (0) | 0 (0) | 0 (0) | 0 (0) | 0.2 (0.51) | 1.3 (3.3) | 4.1 (10) | 20.5 (52.42) |
Source: https://wrcc.dri.edu/cgi-bin/cliMAIN.pl?id7968

== Demographics ==
Historical population
| Census | Pop. | Note | %± |
|---|---|---|---|
| 1910 | 297 | | — |
| 1920 | 2,372 | | 698.7% |
| 1930 | 2,250 | | −5.1% |
| 1940 | 3,167 | | 40.8% |
| 1950 | 3,098 | | −2.2% |
| 1960 | 4,153 | | 34.1% |
| 1970 | 4,563 | | 9.9% |
| 1980 | 5,476 | | 20.0% |
| 1990 | 5,455 | | −0.4% |
| 2000 | 5,645 | | 3.5% |
| 2010 | 5,554 | | −1.6% |
| 2020 | 6,082 | | 9.5% |
U.S. Decennial Census

=== 2020 census ===
As of the 2020 census, Rupert had a population of 6,082. The median age was 32.7 years. 29.2% of residents were under the age of 18 and 15.2% of residents were 65 years of age or older. For every 100 females there were 94.4 males, and for every 100 females age 18 and over there were 91.1 males age 18 and over.

100.0% of residents lived in urban areas, while 0.0% lived in rural areas.

There were 2,189 households in Rupert, of which 39.4% had children under the age of 18 living in them. Of all households, 46.6% were married-couple households, 17.3% were households with a male householder and no spouse or partner present, and 27.7% were households with a female householder and no spouse or partner present. About 26.2% of all households were made up of individuals and 12.4% had someone living alone who was 65 years of age or older.

There were 2,352 housing units, of which 6.9% were vacant. The homeowner vacancy rate was 1.3% and the rental vacancy rate was 5.9%.

Racial composition as of the 2020 census
| Race | Number | Percent |
|---|---|---|
| White | 3,711 | 61.0% |
| Black or African American | 14 | 0.2% |
| American Indian and Alaska Native | 85 | 1.4% |
| Asian | 21 | 0.3% |
| Native Hawaiian and Other Pacific Islander | 3 | 0.0% |
| Some other race | 1,387 | 22.8% |
| Two or more races | 861 | 14.2% |
| Hispanic or Latino (of any race) | 2,869 | 47.2% |

=== 2010 census ===
As of the census of 2010, there were 5,554 people, 2,026 households, and 1,397 families living in the city. The population density was 2,657.4 inhabitants per square mile (1,026.0/km^{2}). There were 2,186 housing units at an average density of 1,045.9 per square mile (403.8/km^{2}). The racial makeup of the city was 75.0% White, 0.3% African American, 1.6% Native American, 0.4% Asian, 20.1% from other races, and 2.6% from two or more races. Hispanic or Latino of any race were 42.9% of the population.

There were 2,026 households, of which 38.8% had children under the age of 18 living with them, 49.0% were married couples living together, 14.1% had a female householder with no husband present, 5.8% had a male householder with no wife present, and 31.0% were non-families. 26.8% of all households were made up of individuals, and 14.2% had someone living alone who was 65 years of age or older. The average household size was 2.71 and the average family size was 3.30.

The median age in the city was 33.3 years. 30.4% of residents were under the age of 18; 9.6% were between the ages of 18 and 24; 23.2% were from 25 to 44; 21.8% were from 45 to 64; and 15% were 65 years of age or older. The gender makeup of the city was 49.0% male and 51.0% female.

=== 2000 census ===
As of the census of 2000, there were 5,645 people, 2,024 households, and 1,443 families living in the city. The population density was 2,779.9 inhabitants per square mile (1,073.3/km^{2}). There were 2,204 housing units at an average density of 1,085.4 per square mile (419.1/km^{2}). The racial makeup of the city was 72.65% White, 0.37% African American, 1.17% Native American, 0.32% Asian, 0.02% Pacific Islander, 22.69% from other races, and 2.78% from two or more races. Hispanic or Latino of any race were 35.39% of the population.

There were 2,024 households, out of which 38.3% had children under the age of 18 living with them, 54.5% were married couples living together, 12.5% had a female householder with no husband present, and 28.7% were non-families. 25.2% of all households were made up of individuals, and 12.7% had someone living alone who was 65 years of age or older. The average household size was 2.75 and the average family size was 3.31.

In the city, the population was spread out, with 31.2% under the age of 18, 10.6% from 18 to 24, 25.0% from 25 to 44, 18.8% from 45 to 64, and 14.3% who were 65 years of age or older. The median age was 32 years. For every 100 females, there were 90.8 males. For every 100 females age 18 and over, there were 86.7 males.

The median income for a household in the city was $25,105, and the median income for a family was $29,423. Males had a median income of $28,070 versus $16,779 for females. The per capita income for the city was $12,253. About 18.9% of families and 21.5% of the population were below the poverty line, including 29.2% of those under age 18 and 11.7% of those age 65 or over.

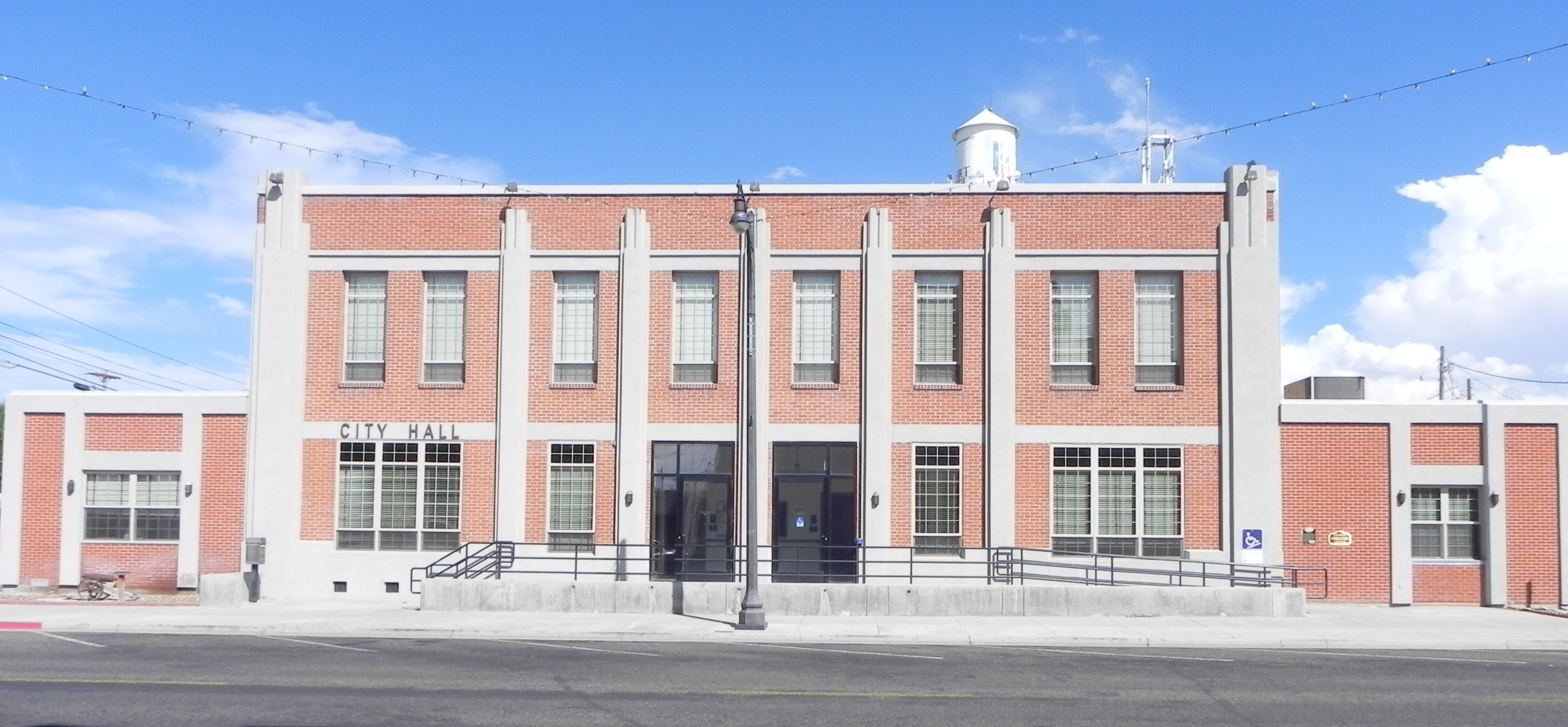
Rupert City Hall

== Education ==
Rupert is served by the Minidoka County Schools system.

Children are zoned to:

- Rupert Elementary School (Rupert - Grades K-5)
- East Minico Middle School (Rupert - grades 6-8)
- Minico High School (unincorporated Myers in Minidoka County, grades 9-12), midway between Paul and Rupert
- Mt. Harrison High School (Heyburn - grades 9-12, alternative high school)

DeMary Memorial Library is the area library.

The county is in the catchment area, but not the taxation zone, for College of Southern Idaho.

== Notable people ==
- Boyd Coddington, hot rod shop-owner and television show host
- Lou Dobbs, television anchor and pundit
- Bill Fagerbakke, actor
- Richard D. Hansen, archaeologist of Mayan ruins
- Dusty Kline, first football coach at Boise Junior College (now Boise State University)
- John Norby, former NFL running back
