= Idaho State Highway 50 =

State highway in Twin Falls and Jerome counties in Idaho, United States

State Highway 50
- SH-50 highlighted in red

Route information
- Maintained by ITD
- Length: 8.092 mi (13.023 km)

Major junctions
- West end: US 30 north of Kimberly
- I-84 north of Hansen
- East end: SH-25 west of Eden

Location
- Country: United States
- State: Idaho
- Counties: Twin Falls, Jerome

Highway system
- Idaho State Highway System; Interstate; US; State
← SH-48	→ SH-51

State Highway 50 (SH-50) is a 8.092-mile (13.023 km) state highway in Twin Falls and Jerome counties in Idaho, United States, that connects with U.S. Route 30 (US 30), north of Kimberly, with Idaho State Highway 25 (SH-25), west of Eden. It crosses over the Snake River and connects with Interstate 84 (I-84) along its route.

== Route description ==
Nearly all of SH-50 is located within rural agricultural area. While it is passes near a few cities, it does not enter any communities. Despite its status as a connector route, that provides eastern access to the city of Twin Falls from I-84, SH-50 is not part of the National Highway System (NHS), a network of roadways important to the country's economy, defense, and mobility.

=== Twin Falls County ===
SH-50 begins at an intersection with US 30 and North 3500 East in Twin Falls County, north of the city of Kimberly and about one mile (1.6 km) north of the city's downtown area. {US 30 heads west along East 3800 North toward Twin Falls, Filer, and Boise and heads south along North 3800 East toward Kimberly, Hansen, and Burley. North 3800 East heads north toward the Twin Falls waterfall on the Snake River.)

From its western terminus, initially as a five-lane road, but quickly narrowing to a two-lane road, SH-50 heads east along East 3800 North for about 2.2 miles (3.5 km), parallel with and about one mile (1.6 km) north of US 30. From there (a point northwest of Hansen) SH-50 curves to head northeast and reaches the Snake River after approximately 1.6 miles (2.6 km). SH-50 crosses the river and the Snake River Canyon on the Hansen Bridge. (The Snake River forms the border between Twin Falls and Jerome counties.)

=== Jerome County ===
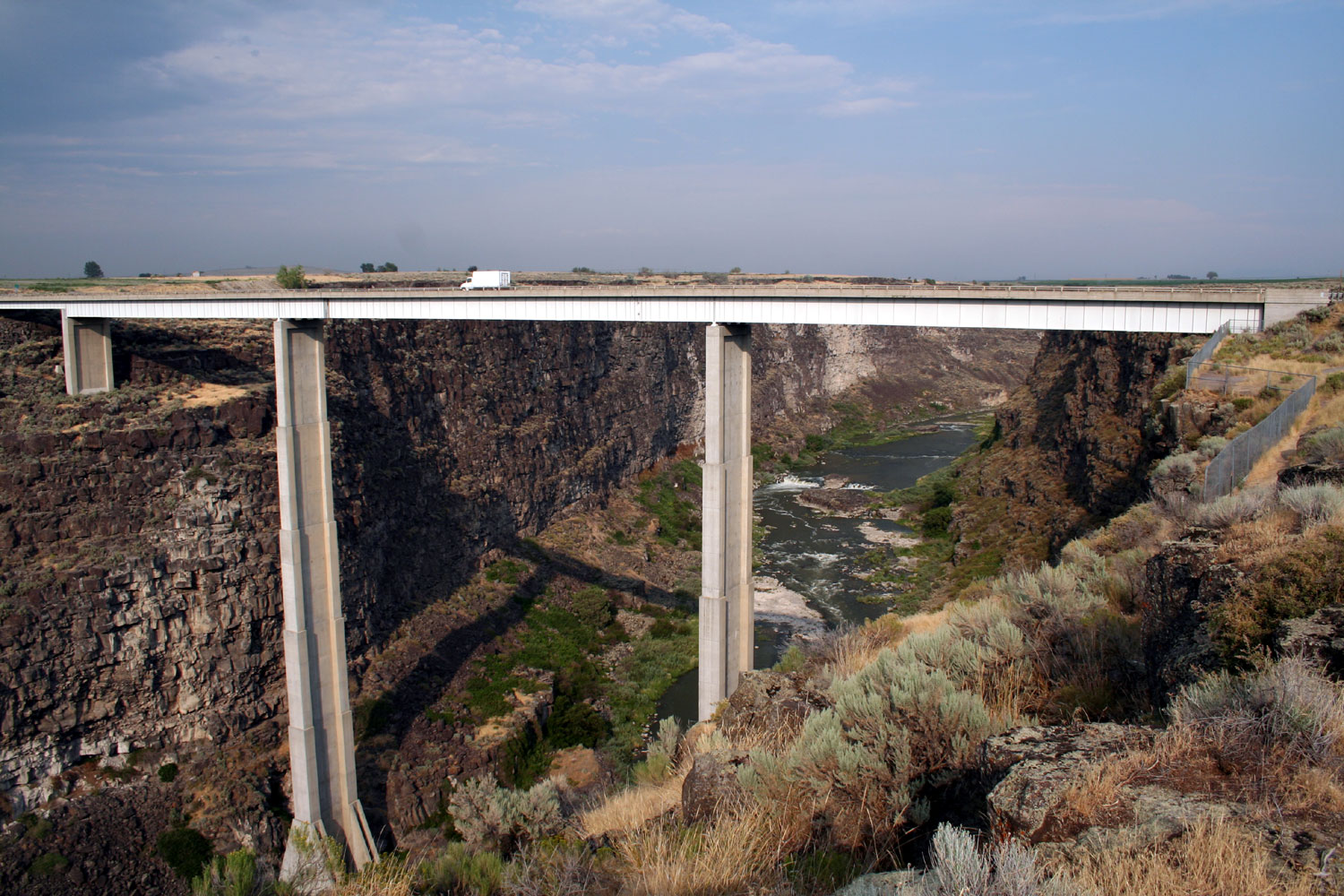
Southwest at Hansen Bridge from the Jerome County side, July 2009. The bridge carries SH-50 over the Snake River and Snake River Canyon.

After crossing the Hansen Bridge and entering Jerome County, SH-50 continues for roughly 1.7 miles (2.7 km) as it curves to head north and reaches its diamond interchange with I-84. As it approaches I-84, SH-50 widens to four-lanes. (There is a truck stop on the southwest side of the interchange along a frontage road, as well as some commercial establishments on the southwest and northeast sides of the interchange.)

After crossing the freeway on an overpass, SH-50 quickly narrows back to two-lanes as it continues north along South 1150 East for about 0.8 miles (1.3 km) before curving sharply to head east along East 900 South. (South 1150 East continues due north through its intersection with East 900 South.) After approximately 1.2 miles (1.9 km), SH-50 curves sharply again to head north along South 1300 East. (East 900 South continues due east through its intersection with South 1300 East.) SH-50 heads north for about one mile (1.6 km) before it connects with Idaho State Highway 50 Connector (SH-50 Conn.). From that junction SH-50 Conn. continues north along South 1300 East to end at SH-25 (westbound), while SH-50 curves sharply to the east again and immediately reaches its eastern terminus at SH-25 (eastbound), at a point roughly three miles (4.8 km) west of Eden. (From the western terminus of SH-50, eastbound SH-25 heads east along East 800 South toward Eden and Hazelton, while westbound SH-25 curves sharply to immedicaly connect with the north end of SH-50 Conn. and then heads north along South 1300 East toward Jarome.)

== Junction list ==
County	Location	mi	km	Destinations	Notes
Twin Falls		0.000	0.000	US 30 west (Kimberly Road [East 3800 North]) – Twin Falls, Filer, Boise	Continuation west from western terminus
Twin Falls		0.000	0.000	North 3500 East north – Twin Falls (waterfall) US 30 south (North 3500 East [North Main Street]) – Kimberly, Hansen, Burley	Western terminus
Snake River		3.887– 4.034	6.256– 6.492	Hansen Bridge on the Twin Falls-Jerome county line	
Jerome		4.647– 4.792	7.479– 7.712	I-84 east (Vietnam Veterans Memorial Highway) – Burley, Rupert, Pocatello I-84 west (Vietnam Veterans Memorial Highway) – Twin Falls, Jerome, Boise	I-84 exit 182
Jerome		7.971	12.828	SH-50 Conn. north (South 1300 East) – SH-25, Jerome	
Jerome		8.092	13.023	SH-25 west – Jerome	Eastern terminus
Jerome		8.092	13.023	SH-25 east (East 800 South) – Eden, Hazelton	Continuation east from eastern terminus
1.000 mi = 1.609 km; 1.000 km = 0.621 mi

== Connector route ==
State Highway 50 Connector
- Location: Jerome County, west of Eden
- Length: 0.140 mi (225 m)

State Highway 50 Connector (SH-50 Conn. / South 1300 East) is a 0.140-mile (0.225 km) state highway near the eastern terminus of SH-50 in Jerome County (west of Eden), that connects SH-50 northbound with SH-25 southbound, and vice versa.. East 800 South (a gravel road) crosses SH-50 Conn. about midway along its route. (East 800 South is a western continuation from the junction of the eastern end of SH-50 with SR-25.)

=== Major intersetions ===
The entire route is in Jerome County.

Location	mi	km	Destinations	Notes
	0.000	0.000	SH-50 west (South 1300 East) – Kimberly, Twin Falls	Continuation west from western terminus
	0.140	0.225	SH-25 west (East 800 South) – Jerome	Continuation east from eastern terminus
1.000 mi = 1.609 km; 1.000 km = 0.621 mi

== See also ==
- List of state highways in Idaho
