= List of cities in Idaho =

List of cities in an American state

Map of the United States with Idaho highlighted

Idaho is a state located in the Western United States. According to the 2020 United States census, Idaho is the 13th least populous state, with 1,839,106 inhabitants, and the 11th largest by land area, spanning 82,643.12 square miles (214,044.7 km^{2}) of land. Idaho is divided into 44 counties, and contains 198 municipalities legally described as cities.

== List of incorporated cities ==
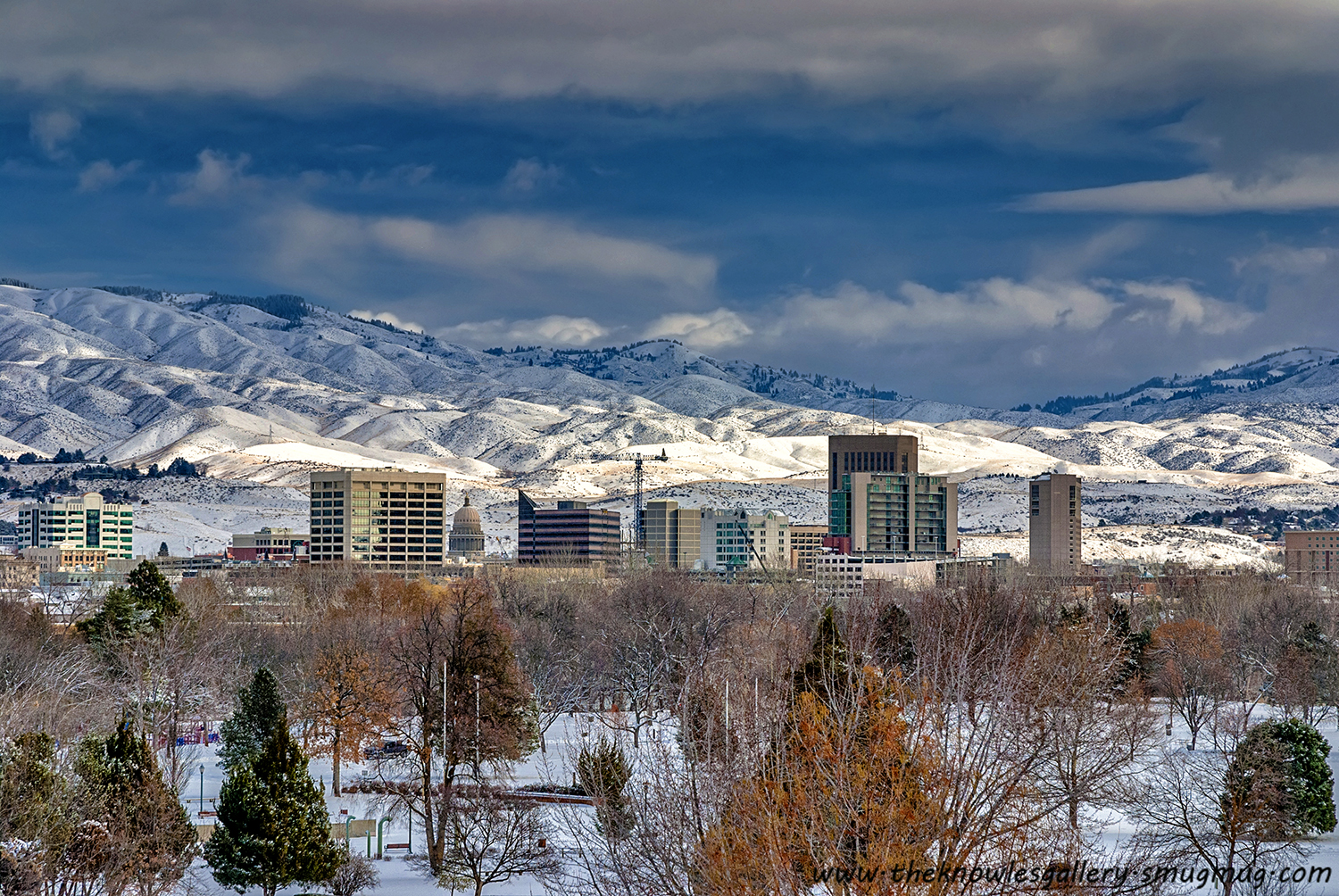
Boise in winter (2013)

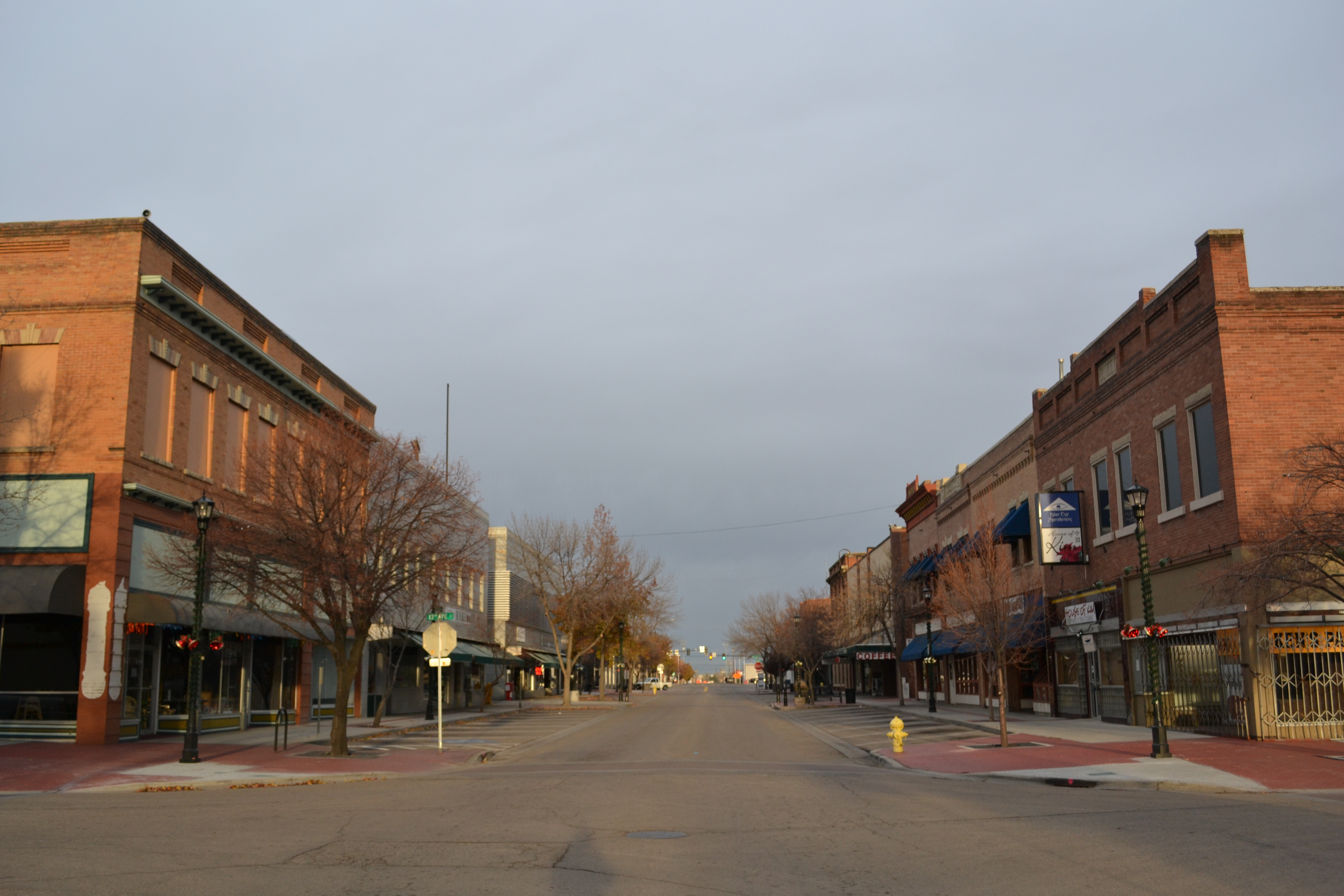
Nampa

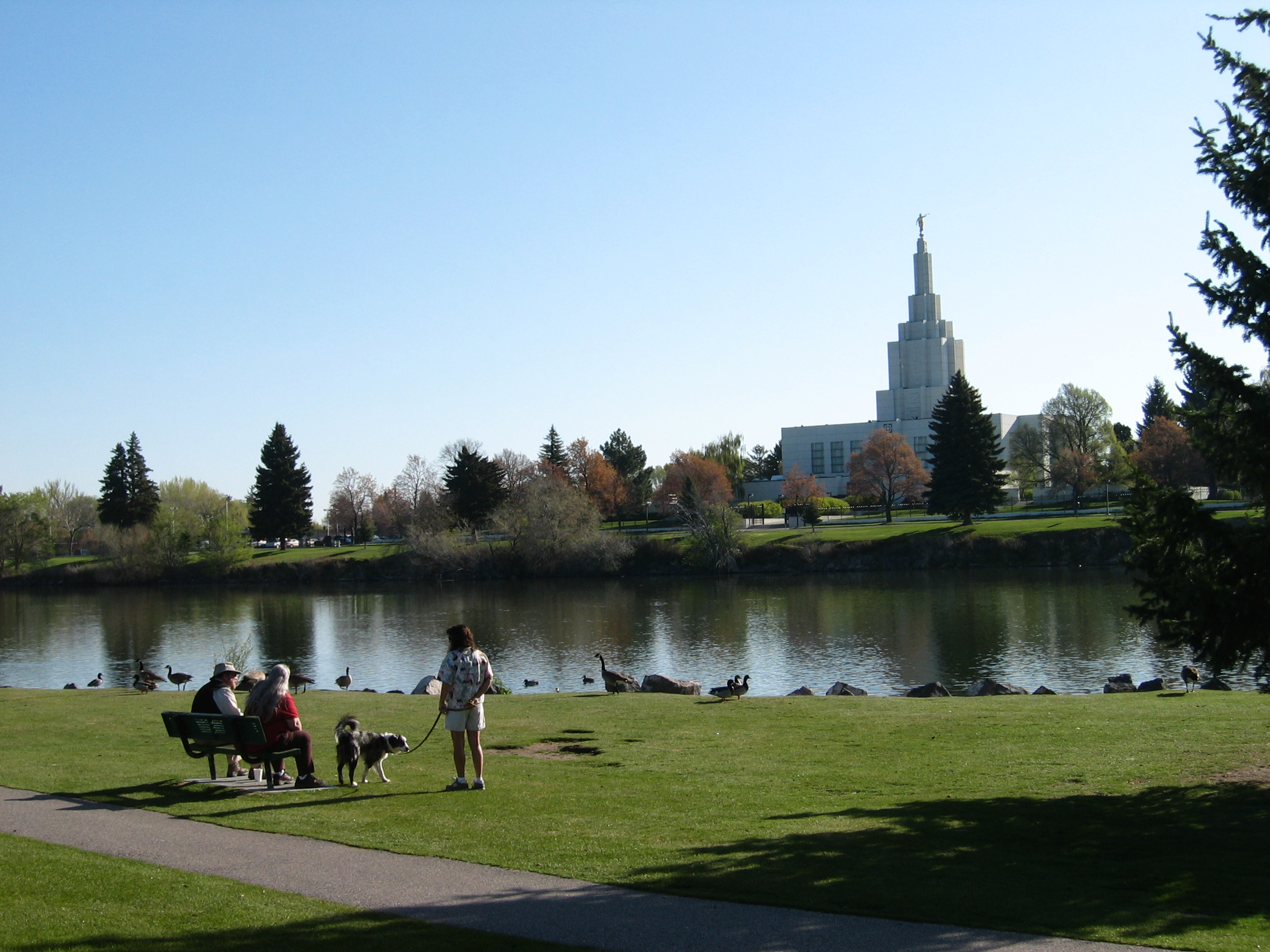
Idaho Falls

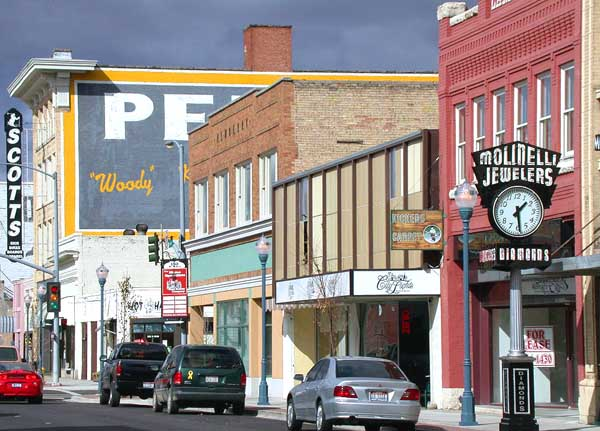
Pocatello

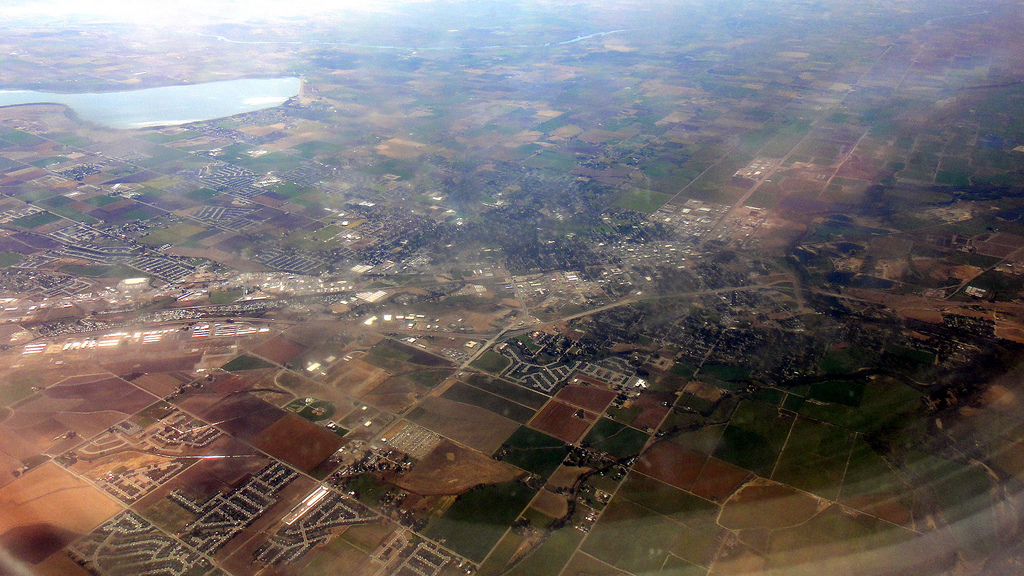
Caldwell

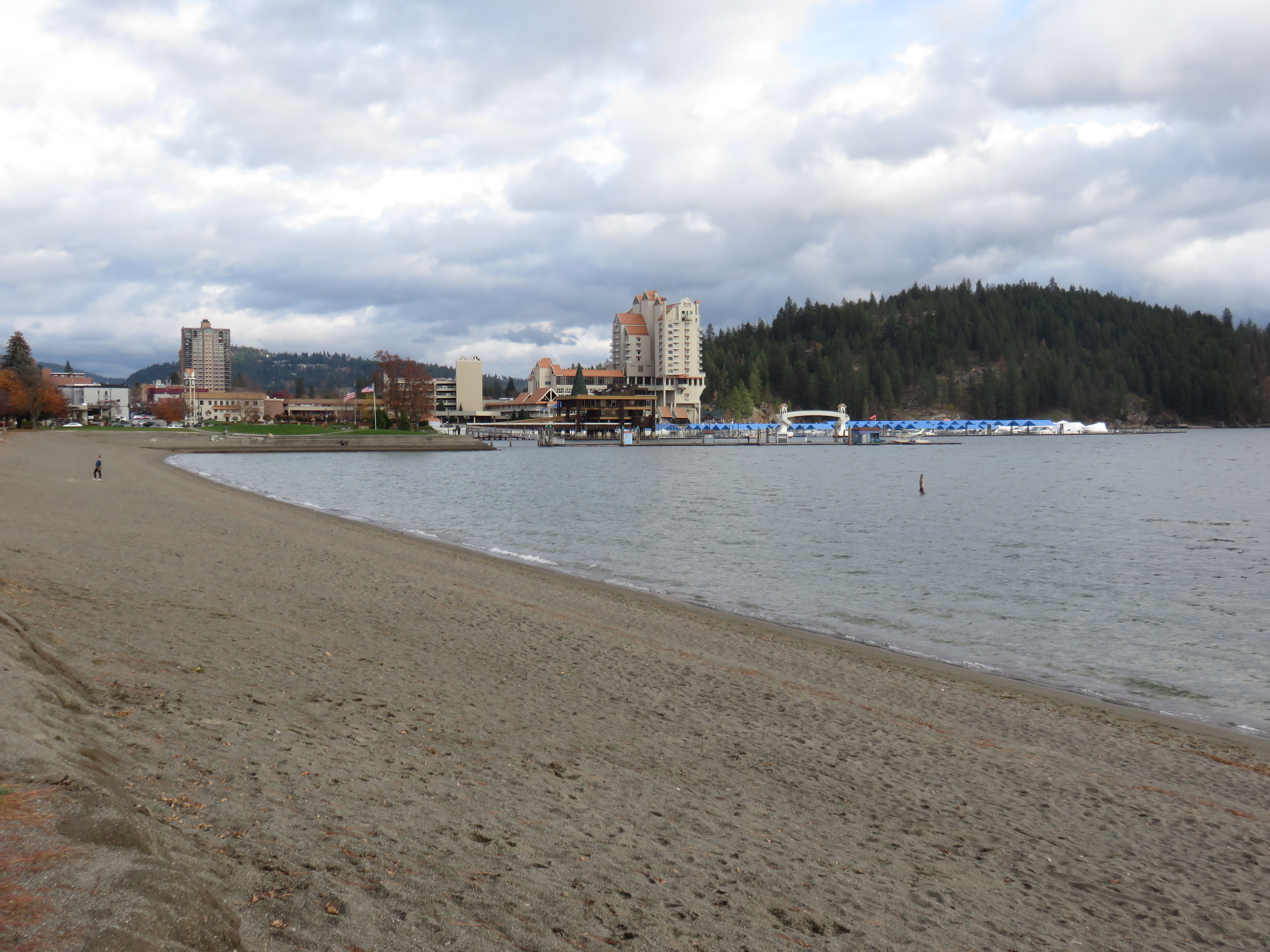
Coeur d'Alene

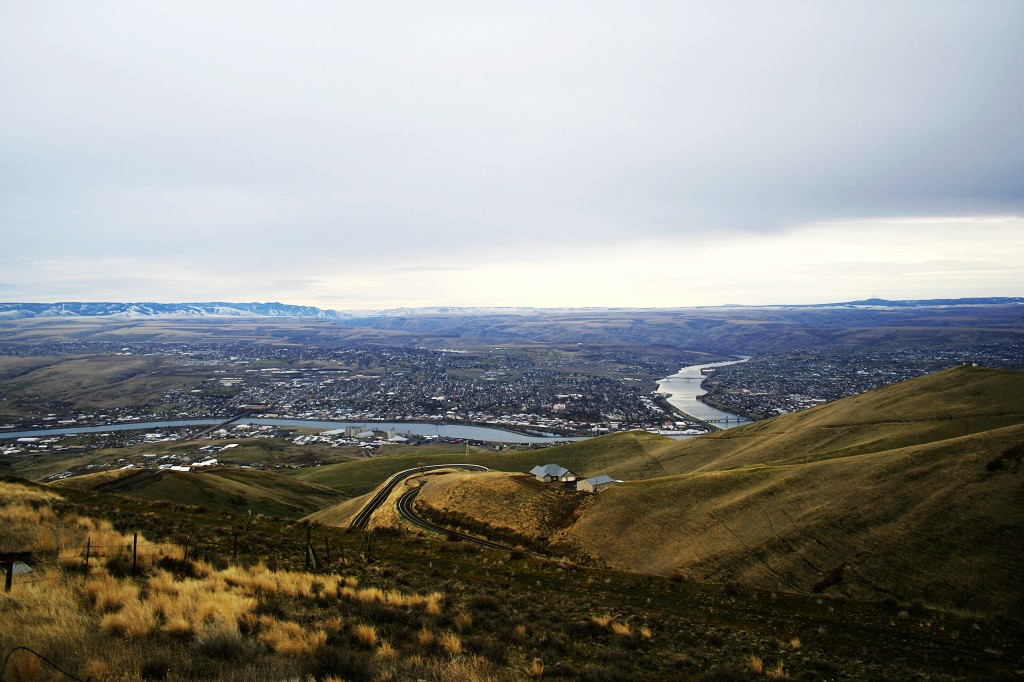
Lewiston

† County seat
†† State capital and county seat

2020 rank	City	2020 Census	2010 Census	Change	County
1	Boise ††	235,684	205,671	+14.59%	Ada
2	Meridian	117,635	75,092	+56.65%	Ada
3	Nampa	100,200	81,557	+22.86%	Canyon
4	Idaho Falls †	64,818	56,813	+14.09%	Bonneville
5	Caldwell †	59,996	46,237	+29.76%	Canyon
6	Pocatello †	56,320	54,255	+3.81%	Bannock
7	Coeur d'Alene †	54,628	44,137	+23.77%	Kootenai
8	Twin Falls †	51,807	44,125	+17.41%	Twin Falls
9	Rexburg †	39,409	25,484	+54.64%	Madison
10	Post Falls	38,485	27,574	+39.57%	Kootenai
11	Lewiston †	34,203	31,894	+7.24%	Nez Perce
12	Eagle	30,346	19,908	+52.43%	Ada
13	Moscow †	25,435	23,800	+6.87%	Latah
14	Kuna	24,011	15,210	+57.86%	Ada
15	Ammon	17,694	13,816	+28.07%	Bonneville
16	Mountain Home †	15,979	14,206	+12.48%	Elmore
17	Chubbuck	15,570	13,922	+11.84%	Bannock
18	Hayden	15,570	13,294	+17.12%	Kootenai
19	Jerome †	12,349	10,890	+13.40%	Jerome
20	Blackfoot †	12,346	11,899	+3.76%	Bingham
21	Garden City	12,316	10,972	+12.25%	Ada
22	Burley †	11,704	10,345	+13.14%	Cassia
23	Star	11,117	5,793	+91.90%	Ada
24	Middleton	9,425	5,524	+70.62%	Canyon
25	Rathdrum	9,211	6,826	+34.94%	Kootenai
26	Hailey †	9,161	7,960	+15.09%	Blaine
27	Sandpoint †	8,639	7,365	+17.30%	Bonner
28	Payette †	8,127	7,433	+9.34%	Payette
29	Emmett †	7,647	6,557	+16.62%	Gem
30	Rupert †	6,082	5,554	+9.51%	Minidoka
31	Fruitland	6,072	4,684	+29.63%	Payette
32	Weiser †	5,630	5,507	+2.23%	Washington
33	Preston †	5,591	5,204	+7.44%	Franklin
34	Rigby †	5,038	3,945	+27.71%	Jefferson
35	Shelley	4,785	4,409	+8.53%	Bingham
36	Kimberly	4,626	3,264	+41.73%	Twin Falls
37	American Falls †	4,568	4,457	+2.49%	Power
38	Buhl	4,558	4,122	+10.58%	Twin Falls
39	Gooding †	3,707	3,567	+3.92%	Gooding
40	Heyburn	3,700	3,089	+19.78%	Minidoka
41	McCall	3,686	2,991	+23.24%	Valley
42	St. Anthony †	3,606	3,542	+1.81%	Fremont
43	Ketchum	3,555	2,689	+32.21%	Blaine
44	Grangeville †	3,308	3,141	+5.32%	Idaho
45	Orofino †	3,239	3,142	+3.09%	Clearwater
46	Soda Springs †	3,133	3,058	+2.45%	Caribou
47	Salmon †	3,119	3,112	+0.22%	Lemhi
48	Wendell	2,917	2,782	+4.85%	Gooding
49	Homedale	2,881	2,633	+9.42%	Owyhee
50	Filer	2,738	2,508	+9.17%	Twin Falls
51	Iona	2,717	1,803	+50.69%	Bonneville
52	Montpelier	2,643	2,597	+1.77%	Bear Lake
53	Bellevue	2,560	2,287	+11.94%	Blaine
54	Dalton Gardens	2,537	2,335	+8.65%	Kootenai
55	Bonners Ferry †	2,520	2,543	−0.90%	Boundary
56	St. Maries †	2,357	2,402	−1.87%	Benewah
57	Spirit Lake	2,337	1,945	+20.15%	Kootenai
58	Kellogg	2,314	2,120	+9.15%	Shoshone
59	Malad City †	2,299	2,095	+9.74%	Oneida
60	Victor	2,157	1,928	+11.88%	Teton
61	Parma	2,096	1,983	+5.70%	Canyon
62	Driggs †	1,984	1,660	+19.52%	Teton
63	Sun Valley	1,783	1,406	+26.81%	Blaine
64	Aberdeen	1,756	1,994	−11.94%	Bingham
65	Sugar City	1,715	1,514	+13.28%	Madison
66	Priest River	1,696	1,751	−3.14%	Bonner
67	Pinehurst	1,679	1,619	+3.71%	Shoshone
68	Shoshone †	1,653	1,461	+13.14%	Lincoln
69	Wilder	1,597	1,533	+4.17%	Canyon
70	Osburn	1,567	1,555	+0.77%	Shoshone
71	New Plymouth	1,494	1,538	−2.86%	Payette
72	Ponderay	1,289	1,137	+13.37%	Bonner
73	Glenns Ferry	1,282	1,319	−2.81%	Elmore
74	Marsing	1,229	1,031	+19.20%	Owyhee
75	Paul	1,195	1,169	+2.22%	Minidoka
76	Lapwai	1,169	1,137	+2.81%	Nez Perce
77	Ucon	1,160	1,108	+4.69%	Bonneville
78	Kamiah	1,117	1,295	−13.75%	Lewis
79	Hansen	1,086	1,144	−5.07%	Twin Falls
80	Genesee	1,030	955	+7.85%	Latah
81	Franklin	1,025	641	+59.91%	Franklin
82	Plummer	1,015	1,044	−2.78%	Benewah
83	Cascade †	1,005	939	+7.03%	Valley
84	Hagerman	968	872	+11.01%	Gooding
85	Ashton	949	1,127	−15.79%	Fremont
86	Kootenai	941	678	+38.79%	Bonner
87	Grace	920	915	+0.55%	Caribou
88	Challis †	902	1,081	−16.56%	Custer
89	Troy	890	862	+3.25%	Latah
90	Arco †	879	995	−11.66%	Butte
91	Council †	867	839	+3.34%	Adams
92	McCammon	825	809	+1.98%	Bannock
93	Cottonwood	822	900	−8.67%	Idaho
94	Moyie Springs	822	718	+14.48%	Boundary
95	Greenleaf	812	846	−4.02%	Canyon
96	Hazelton	803	753	+6.64%	Jerome
97	Inkom	792	854	−7.26%	Bannock
98	Wallace †	791	784	+0.89%	Shoshone
99	Teton	787	735	+7.07%	Fremont
100	Oakley	786	763	+3.01%	Cassia
101	Potlatch	763	804	−5.10%	Latah
102	Hauser	761	678	+12.24%	Kootenai
103	Dover	752	556	+35.25%	Bonner
104	Horseshoe Bend	715	707	+1.13%	Boise
105	Menan	715	741	−3.51%	Jefferson
106	Athol	709	692	+2.46%	Kootenai
107	Carey	685	604	+13.41%	Blaine
108	Smelterville	670	627	+6.86%	Shoshone
109	Ririe	667	656	+1.68%	Jefferson
110	Hayden Lake	649	574	+13.07%	Kootenai
111	Mullan	646	692	−6.65%	Shoshone
112	Juliaetta	624	579	+7.77%	Latah
113	Notus	609	531	+14.69%	Canyon
114	Melba	572	513	+11.50%	Canyon
115	Downey	571	625	−8.64%	Bannock
116	Paris †	541	513	+5.46%	Bear Lake
117	Firth	517	477	+8.39%	Bingham
118	New Meadows	517	496	+4.23%	Adams
119	Kooskia	514	607	−15.32%	Idaho
120	Clark Fork	513	536	−4.29%	Bonner
121	Dubois †	511	677	−24.52%	Clark
122	Weston	511	437	+16.93%	Franklin
123	Dayton	510	463	+10.15%	Franklin
124	Deary	508	506	+0.40%	Latah
125	Georgetown	503	476	+5.67%	Bear Lake
126	Roberts	500	580	−13.79%	Jefferson
127	Pierce	467	508	−8.07%	Clearwater
128	Idaho City †	466	485	−3.92%	Boise
129	Craigmont	458	501	−8.58%	Lewis
130	Nezperce †	458	466	−1.72%	Lewis
131	Fairfield †	441	416	+6.01%	Camas
132	Grand View	440	452	−2.65%	Owyhee
133	Mackay	439	517	−15.09%	Custer
134	Richfield	431	482	−10.58%	Lincoln
135	Lewisville	421	458	−8.08%	Jefferson
136	Clifton	413	259	+59.46%	Franklin
137	Culdesac	413	380	+8.68%	Nez Perce
138	Weippe	400	441	−9.30%	Clearwater
139	Eden	393	405	−2.96%	Jerome
140	Riggins	372	419	−11.22%	Idaho
141	Lava Hot Springs	358	407	−12.04%	Bannock
142	Basalt	357	394	−9.39%	Bingham
143	Winchester	356	340	+4.71%	Lewis
144	Arimo	354	355	−0.28%	Bannock
145	Declo	338	343	−1.46%	Cassia
146	Newdale	337	323	+4.33%	Fremont
147	Cambridge	335	328	+2.13%	Washington
148	Mud Lake	321	358	−10.34%	Jefferson
149	Tetonia	308	269	+14.50%	Teton
150	Parker	302	305	−0.98%	Fremont
151	Bancroft	299	377	−20.69%	Caribou
152	Kendrick	288	303	−4.95%	Latah
153	Dietrich	284	332	−14.46%	Lincoln
154	Irwin	259	219	+18.26%	Bonneville
155	Bliss	258	318	−18.87%	Gooding
156	Worley	253	257	−1.56%	Kootenai
157	Donnelly	249	152	+63.82%	Valley
158	Hollister	243	272	−10.66%	Twin Falls
159	Rockland	242	295	−17.97%	Power
160	Albion	234	267	−12.36%	Cassia
161	Harrison	233	203	+14.78%	Kootenai
162	East Hope	229	210	+9.05%	Bonner
163	Swan Valley	225	204	+10.29%	Bonneville
164	Oldtown	221	184	+20.11%	Bonner
165	Castleford	215	226	−4.87%	Twin Falls
166	Bloomington	199	206	−3.40%	Bear Lake
167	Onaway	196	187	+4.81%	Latah
168	Island Park	193	286	−32.52%	Fremont
169	Midvale	193	171	+12.87%	Washington
170	Wardner	192	188	+2.13%	Shoshone
171	Bovill	191	260	−26.54%	Latah
172	Stites	171	221	−22.62%	Idaho
173	Malta	167	193	−13.47%	Cassia
174	Peck	166	197	−15.74%	Nez Perce
175	Fernan Lake Village	164	169	−2.96%	Kootenai
176	Moore	162	189	−14.29%	Butte
177	St. Charles	161	131	+22.90%	Bear Lake
178	Crouch	154	162	−4.94%	Boise
179	Elk River	139	125	+11.20%	Clearwater
180	Ferdinand	133	159	−16.35%	Idaho
181	Acequia	131	124	+5.65%	Minidoka
182	Stanley	116	63	+84.13%	Custer
183	Murtaugh	114	115	−0.87%	Twin Falls
184	Huetter	104	100	+4.00%	Kootenai
185	Hope	98	86	+13.95%	Bonner
186	Leadore	98	105	−6.67%	Lemhi
187	Minidoka	86	112	−23.21%	Minidoka
188	Tensed	84	123	−31.71%	Benewah
189	White Bird	83	91	−8.79%	Idaho
190	Butte City	78	74	+5.41%	Butte
191	Placerville	48	53	−9.43%	Boise
192	Reubens	46	71	−35.21%	Lewis
193	Lost River	42	68	−38.24%	Custer
194	State Line	39	38	+2.63%	Kootenai
195	Spencer	31	37	−16.22%	Clark
196	Drummond	13	16	−18.75%	Fremont
197	Clayton	10	7	+42.86%	Custer
198	Warm River	4	3	+33.33%	Fremont

== Former cities ==
On December 9, 2024, in a Franklin County Commission meeting, Oxford was disincorporated. Oxford had a population of 42 at the 2020 census.

== See also ==
- List of census-designated places in Idaho
- List of counties in Idaho
