= U.S. Route 93 in Idaho =

Section of U.S. Highway in Idaho, United States

U.S. Highway 93
- US 93 highlighted in red

Route information
- Maintained by ITD
- Length: 350.819 mi (564.588 km)
- Existed: 1926–present

Major junctions
- South end: US 93 at the Nevada state line near Jackpot
- US 30 in Twin Falls; I-84 near Twin Falls; US 26 from Shoshone to Arco; US 20 from Carey to Arco
- North end: US 93 at the Montana state line at Lost Trail Pass

Location
- Country: United States
- State: Idaho
- Counties: Twin Falls, Jerome, Lincoln, Blaine, Butte, Custer, Lemhi

Highway system
- United States Numbered Highway System; List; Special; Divided; Idaho State Highway System; Interstate; US; State
← US 91	→ US 95

U.S. Route 93 (US 93) is a north–south U.S. Highway in the U.S. state of Idaho.

== Route description ==
US 93 enters southern Idaho from Nevada, immediately north of the border casino town of Jackpot. Heading northbound in Twin Falls County, it passes through Rogerson and Hollister towards Twin Falls. West of the city, US-93 turns and runs east–west for a few miles, parallel with US-30. This section is Pole Line Road; the highway returns to its north–south orientation in Twin Falls at the intersection of Pole Line Road and Blue Lakes Boulevard.

North of Twin Falls, US-93 crosses the Snake River Canyon via the Perrine Bridge, 486 feet (148 m) above the water. Approximately 3 miles (5 km) north of the bridge, the highway intersects with Interstate 84 at Exit 173.

Further north in Shoshone, US-93 connects with the southern terminus of State Highway 75, the former route of US-93 to Ketchum and over Galena Summit (8,701 feet (2,652 m) above sea level) to Stanley and Clayton. Present-day US-93 diverts in a northeasterly route to Richfield, Carey, the Craters of the Moon, and Arco. Between Shoshone and Arco, the highway runs concurrently with the east–west US-26, and also with US-20 between Carey and Arco.

From Arco, the highway turns northwest and climbs the Big Lost River valley through Mackay. This section provides views of the Lost River Range to the northeast of the highway, including Borah Peak, the highest point in the state at 12,662 feet (3,859 m). Mackay Dam and reservoir are on the southwest side of the highway. The highway crosses the Willow Creek Summit at 7,161 feet (2,183 m) (web-cam) and later descends into Grand View Canyon and heads into the city of Challis.

US-93 creates the northern terminus of State Highway 75 just south of Challis and takes over as the northern leg of the Salmon River Scenic Byway. It descends with the Salmon River as it winds north around the edge of the Lost River and Lemhi mountain ranges into the city of Salmon at 4,004 feet (1,220 m).

Continuing north, the US-93 runs along portions of the Lewis and Clark Trail. The highway follows the descending northbound river until North Fork at 3,620 feet (1,103 m), where the Salmon River makes a left turn to flow west across the state to Riggins. US-93 continues north, climbing the North Fork of the Salmon River into the Bitterroot Range, passing through the Salmon-Challis National Forest and Gibbonsville. The highway exits Idaho at Lost Trail Pass (web-cam) at 7,014 feet (2,138 m) and enters Montana toward the Bitterroot Valley. West of the highway at the pass is the Lost Trail Powder Mountain ski area, with terrain in both states.

== History ==
US-93 was established in 1926, initially using the modern-day route of SH-75 between Shoshone and Challis. The highway was re-aligned to its modern route via Arco in 1977, replacing an alternative route.

In 2010, the 5.5-mile (8.9 km) Pole Line Road bypass around Twin Falls opened to traffic. US 93 was re-routed to the new bypass, while the old route was signed as US 93 Business.

== Gallery ==
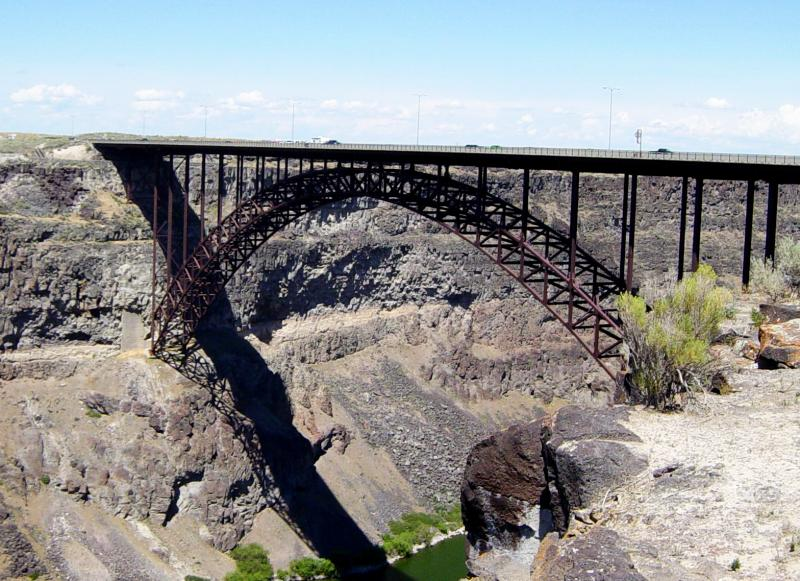
The Perrine Bridge near Twin Falls

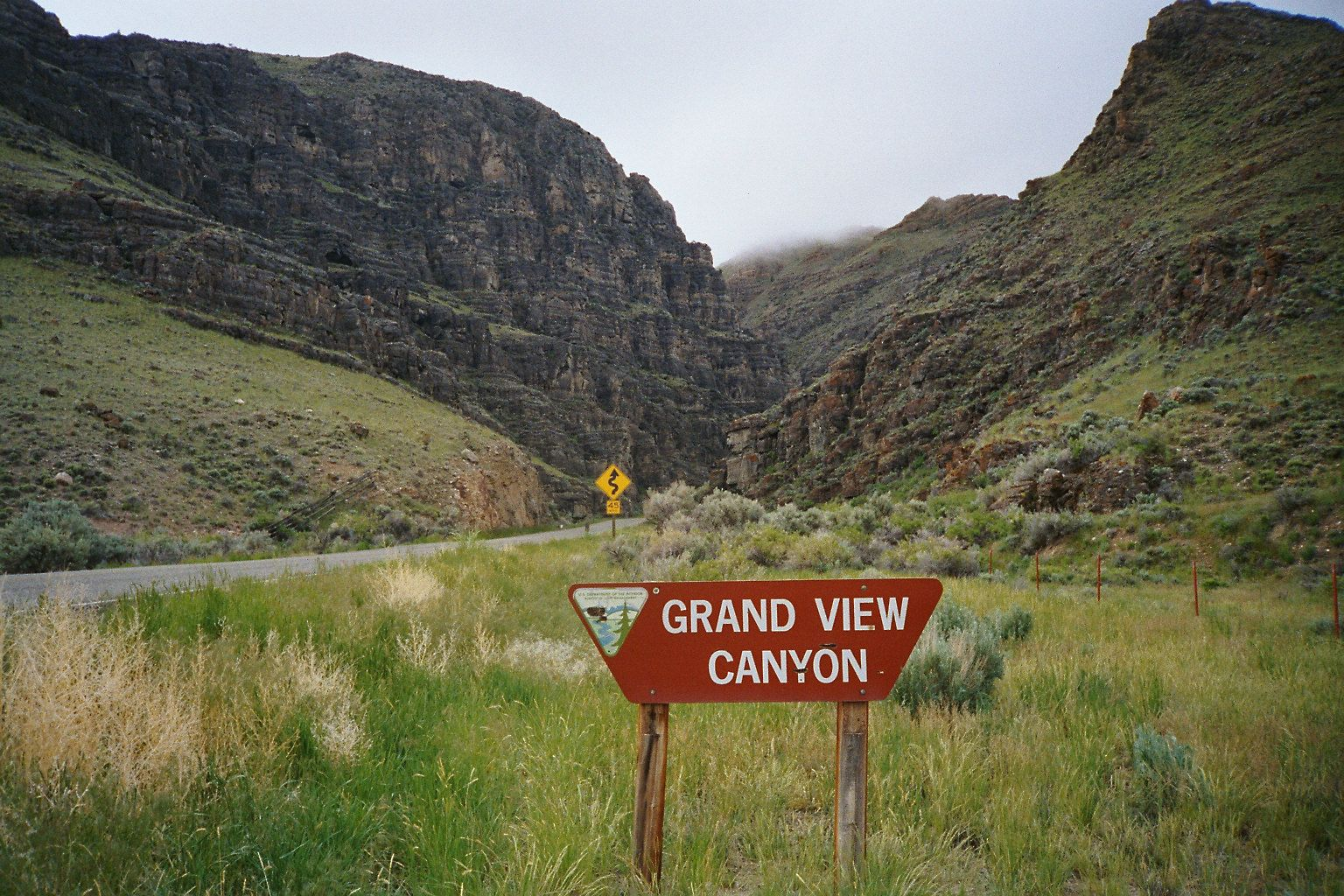
Grand View Canyon (US 93 between Mackay & Challis)

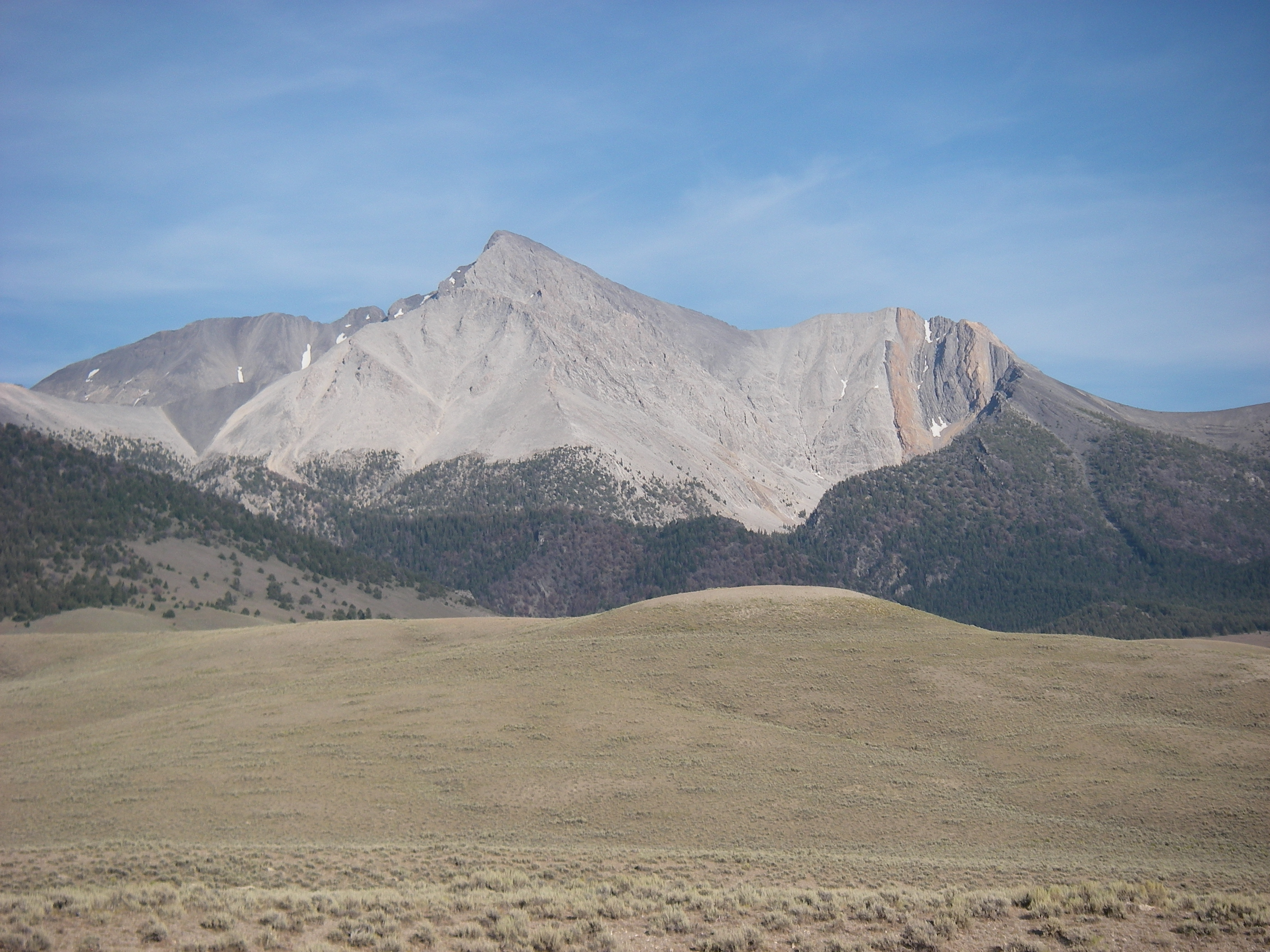
Borah Peak, Idaho's tallest mountain, viewed from U.S. Route 93 in Idaho

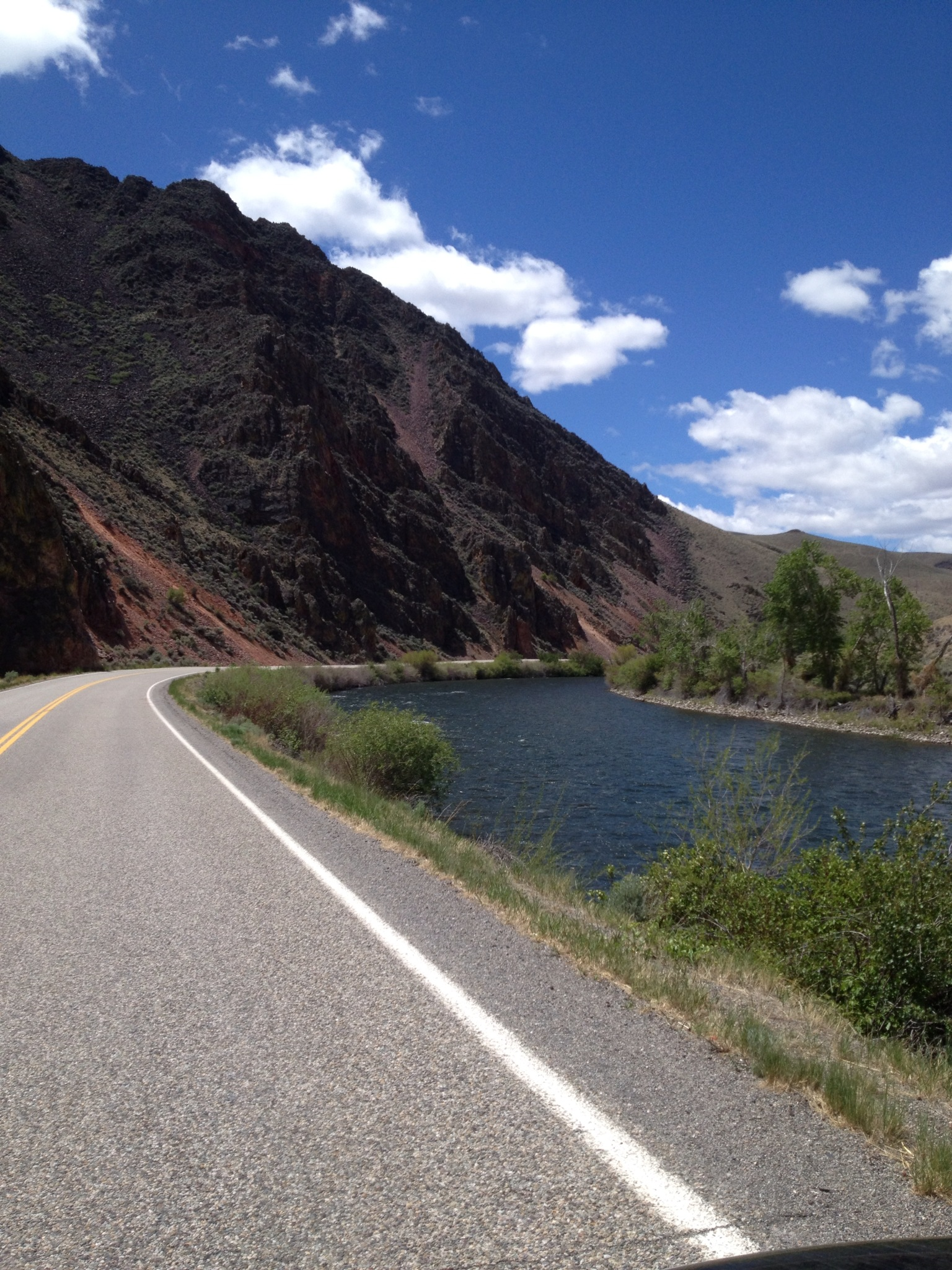
US 93 in Idaho

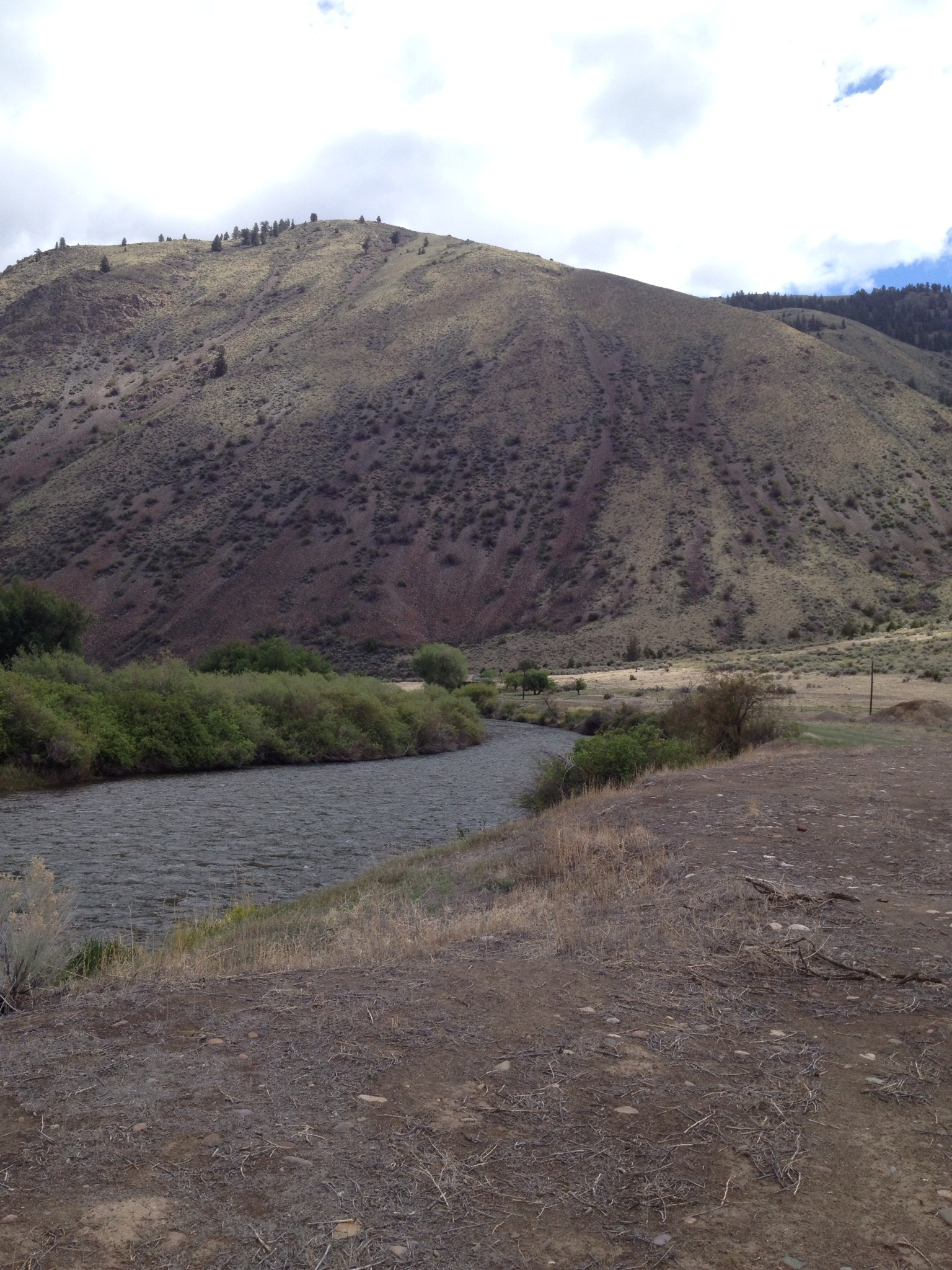
Salmon River

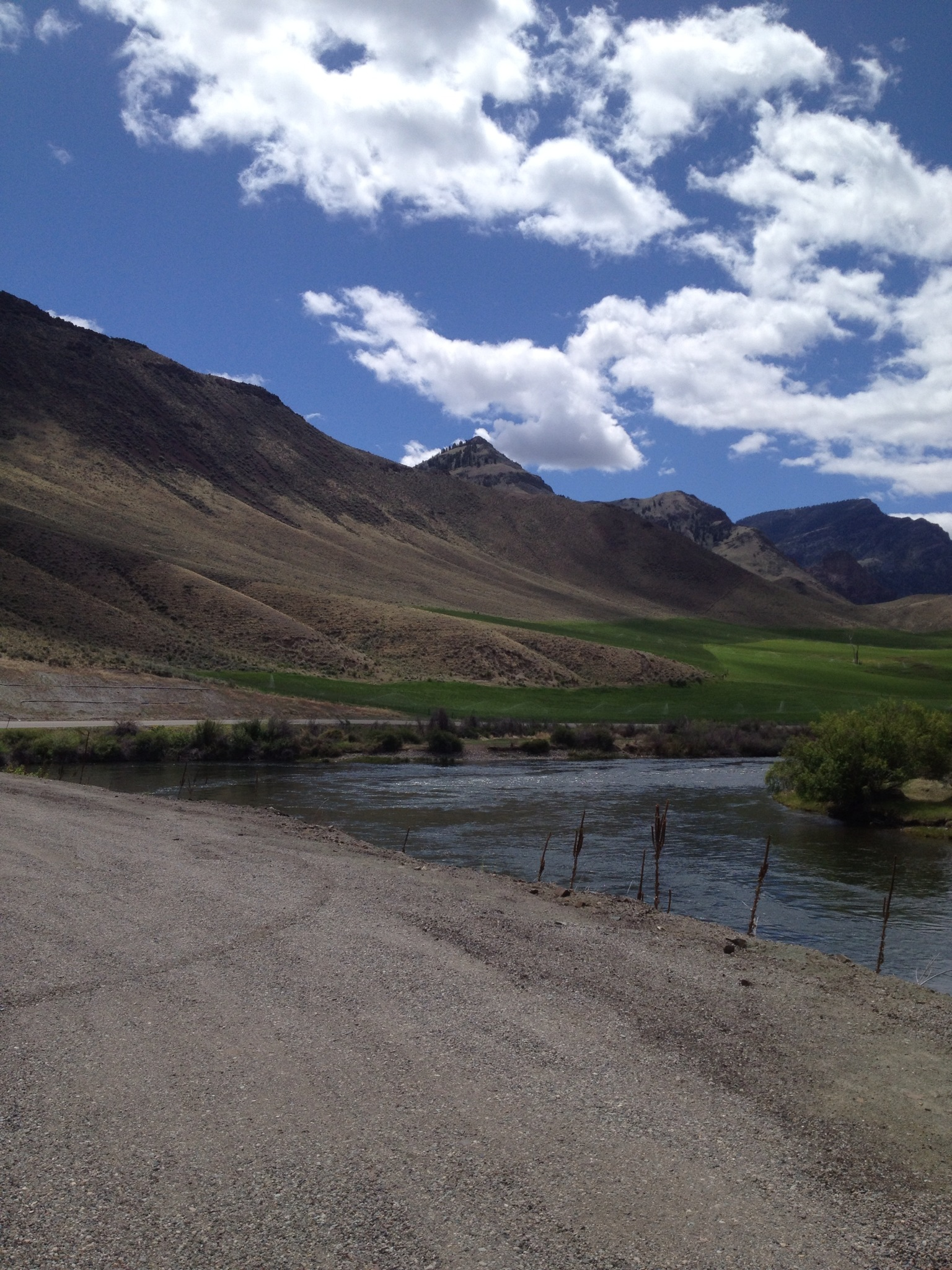
US 93 along Salmon River

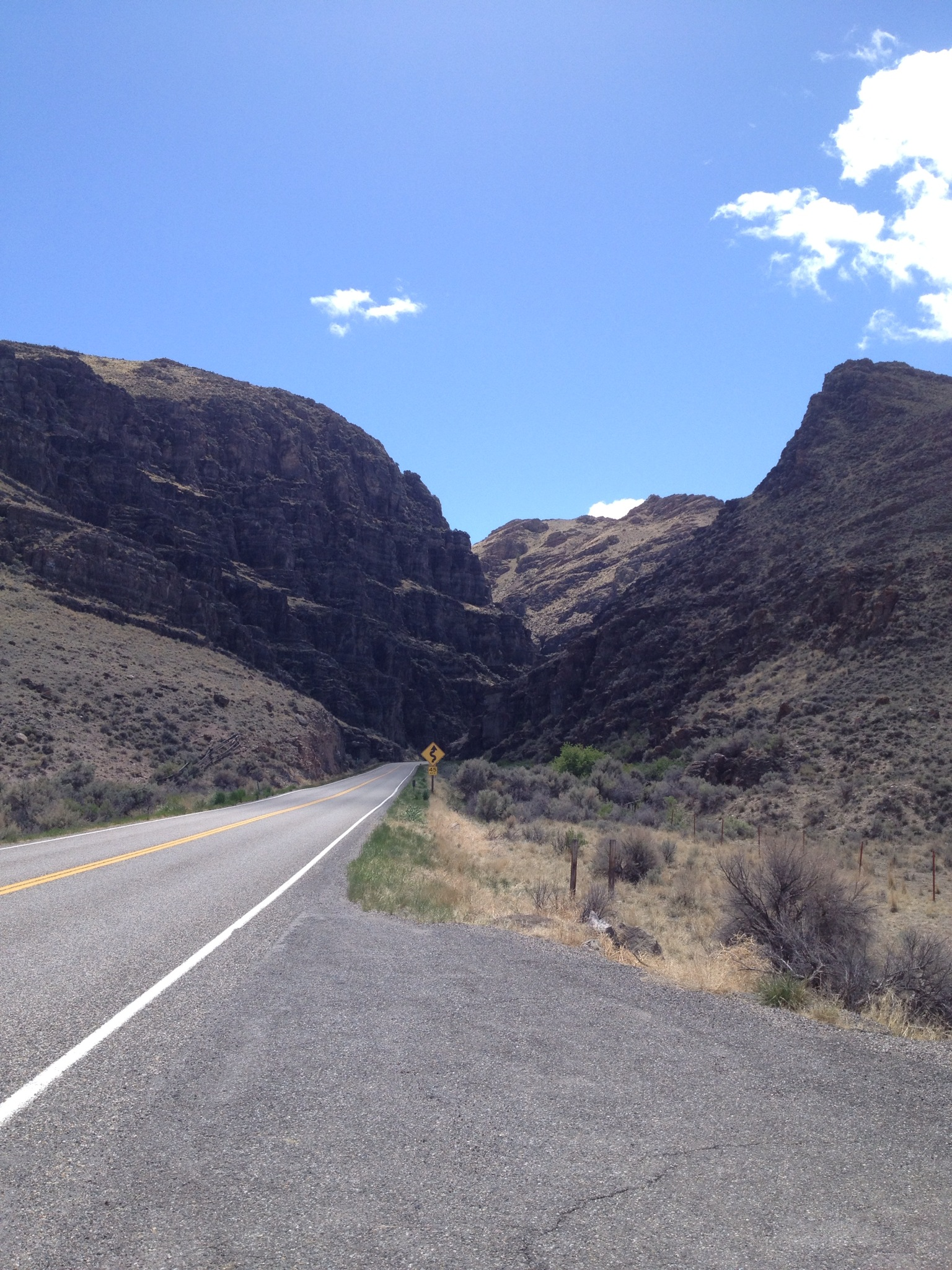
US Route 93 in Idaho

== Major intersections ==
County	Location	mi	km	Destinations	Notes
Twin Falls		0.000	0.000	US 93 south – Jackpot, Wells	Continuation into Nevada
Twin Falls	Godwin	38.050	61.236	SH-74 east – Twin Falls	
Twin Falls		41.498	66.785	US 93 Bus. north / US 30 (Idaho Byway) – Filer, Twin Falls City Center, Boise	Interchange
Twin Falls				Pole Line Road / 4100 North	Interchange; southbound exit and northbound entrance
Twin Falls	Twin Falls	49.455	79.590	Blue Lakes Boulevard south (US 93 Bus. south)	
Snake River				I.B. Perrine Bridge over Snake River Canyon	
Jerome		53.056	85.385	I-84 – Sun Valley, Boise, Pocatello	I-84 exit 173
Jerome		58.708	94.481	SH-25 – Jerome, Eden	
Lincoln	Shoshone	73.195	117.796	SH-24 east – Dietrich	Western terminus of SH–24
Lincoln	Shoshone	73.619	118.478	US 26 west (South Rail Street) – Gooding	Southern end of US-26 concurrency
Lincoln	Shoshone	73.659	118.543	SH-75 north – Sun Valley	Southern terminus of SH–75
Blaine	Carey	112.972	181.811	US 20 west – Picabo	Southern end of US-20 concurrency
Butte	Arco	156.259	251.474	US 20 / US 26 east – Idaho Falls	Northern end of US-20/US-26 concurrencies
Custer		244.325	393.203	SH-75 south – Stanley, Sun Valley	Northern terminus of SH–75
Pahsimeroi River				Bridge	
Lemhi	Salmon	304.675	490.327	SH-28 south (Sacajawea Historic Byway) – Leadore, Idaho Falls	Northern terminus of SH–28
Lemhi	Lost Trail Pass	350.819	564.588	US 93 north – Hamilton, Missoula	Continuation into Montana
1.000 mi = 1.609 km; 1.000 km = 0.621 mi: Concurrency terminus; Incomplete access

== See also ==
- List of U.S. Highways in Idaho
- List of highways numbered 93

U.S. Route 93
Previous state: Nevada	Idaho	Next state: Montana
