= Twin Falls metropolitan area =

Coordinates: 42°35′N 114°28′W

Twin Falls, Idaho Metro Area
- Metropolitan Statistical Area
- Twin Falls, ID Metropolitan Statistical Area
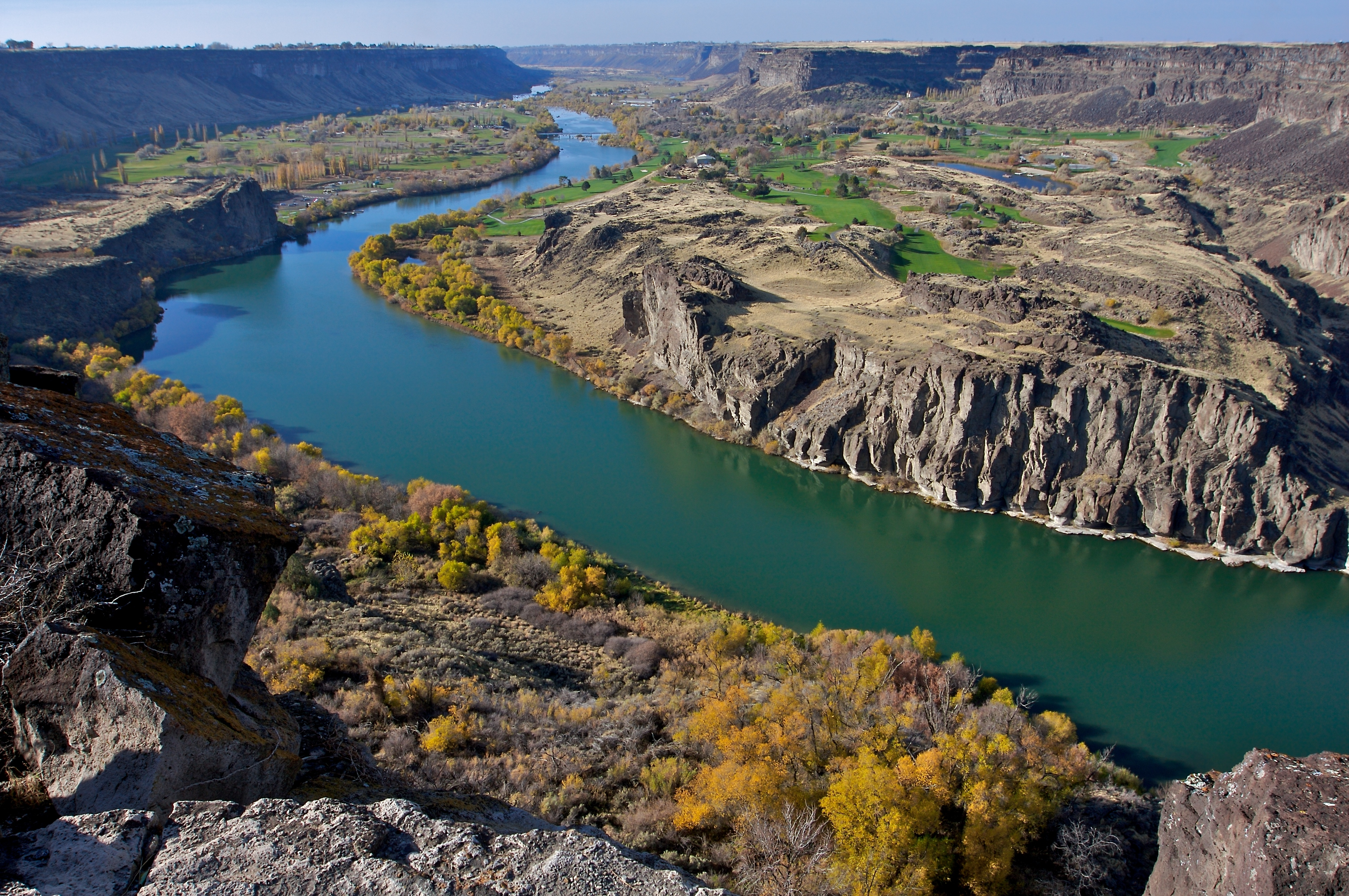
- Snake River Canyon, Idaho
Interactive Map of Twin Falls, ID MSA
City of Twin Falls
Twin Falls, ID MSA
- Country: United States
- State: Idaho
- Principal city: Twin Falls
- Other city: Jerome
- Time zone: UTC-7 (MST)
  - Summer (DST): UTC-6 (MDT)

The Twin Falls metropolitan statistical area (MSA), as defined by the United States Census Bureau, is an area consisting of two counties in the Magic Valley region of Idaho, anchored by the city of Twin Falls.

As of the 2010 census, the MSA had a population of 99,604. According to 2016 estimates, the population grew 6.93% to 106,508.

== Counties ==
- Twin Falls
- Jerome

== Communities ==
- Places with more than 30,000 inhabitants
  - Twin Falls (Principal Hub City)
- Places with 10,000 to 30,000 inhabitants
  - Jerome
- Places with 1,000 to 10,000 inhabitants
  - Buhl
  - Filer
  - Kimberly
  - Hansen
- Places with 500 to 1,000 inhabitants
  - Hazelton
- Places with less than 500 inhabitants
  - Castleford
  - Eden
  - Hollister
  - Murtaugh
- Unincorporated places
  - Amsterdam
  - Artesian
  - Caldron Linn
  - Clover
  - Curry
  - Deep Creek
  - Fairview
  - Falls City
  - Greenwood
  - Godwin
  - Hidden Valley
  - Hunt
  - Kasota
  - Knull
  - Peavey
  - Milner Dam
  - Rock Creek
  - Sugar Loaf
  - Rogerson
  - Valley

== Demographics ==
As of the census of 2000, there were 82,626 people, 30,151 households, and 21,764 families residing within the USA. The racial makeup of the USA was 91.25% White, 0.20% African American, 0.71% Native American, 0.65% Asian, 0.08% Pacific Islander, 5.11% from other races, and 2.00% from two or more races. Hispanic or Latino of any race were 1.11% of the population.

The median income for a household in the USA was $34,601, and the median income for a family was $39,485. Males had a median income of $29,047 versus $20,510 for females. The per capita income for the USA was $16,104.

== See also ==
- Idaho census statistical areas
