= Amsterdam, Idaho =

Unincorporated community in Twin Falls County, Idaho, United States

- Unincorporated community
- Location within Idaho Location within the United States
- Coordinates: 42°17′45″N 114°35′36″W
- Country: United States
- State: Idaho
- County: Twin Falls
- Elevation: 4,685 ft (1,428 m)
- Time zone: UTC-7 (Mountain (MST))
  - Summer (DST): UTC-6 (MDT)
- ZIP Code: 83301
- GNIS feature ID: 396039

Amsterdam is an unincorporated community in Twin Falls County, Idaho, United States, roughly 19 miles (31 km) south-southwest of Twin Falls. Amsterdam is located along U.S. Route 93. Amsterdam had a post office 1912–1954.

Amsterdam is part of the Twin Falls, Idaho Metropolitan Statistical Area.

== History ==
In the Early 1900s the southern area of Idaho went was part of a massive reclamation project and many irrigation projects were completed. This made the region livable for growing crops and ranching. In 1905 the Milner Damn was completed, along with a canal network supplying water to 200,000 acres of land, on the south side of Snake River Canyon. This attracted large numbers of settlers to the region.

The community was initially settled around 1910 by Dutch immigrants from Iowa. The town's post office was established in 1912.
