= Peavey, Idaho =

Unincorporated community in Twin Falls County, Idaho, United States

- Unincorporated community
- Location within Idaho Location within the United States
- Coordinates: 42°35′01″N 114°39′10″W
- Country: United States
- State: Idaho
- County: Twin Falls
- Elevation: 3,734 ft (1,138 m)
- Time zone: UTC-7 (Mountain (MST))
  - Summer (DST): UTC-6 (MDT)
- ZIP Code: 83328
- GNIS feature ID: 397017

Peavey is an unincorporated community in Twin Falls County, Idaho, United States, roughly 2.5 miles (4.0 km) west-northwest of Filer. Peavey had a post office from 1907–1909. Pevey is located along U.S. Route 30.

Peavey is part of the Twin Falls, Idaho Metropolitan Statistical Area.
