= Artesian City, Idaho =

Unincorporated community in Twin Falls and Cassia counties in Idaho, United States

- Unincorporated community
- Location within Idaho Location within the United States
- Coordinates: 42°25′02″N 114°09′40″W
- Country: United States
- State: Idaho
- County: Twin Falls, Cassia
- Elevation: 42,356 ft (12,910 m)
- Time zone: UTC-7 (Mountain (MST))
  - Summer (DST): UTC-6 (MDT)
- ZIP Code: 83334
- GNIS feature ID: 396053

Artesian City is an unincorporated community in Twin Falls and Cassia counties in Idaho, United States, roughly 2.5 miles (4.0 km) west-northwest of Filer. Artesian City had a post office from 1907–1909.

Peavey is part of the Twin Falls, Idaho Metropolitan Statistical Area.
