= Clover, Idaho =

Unincorporated community in Twin Falls County, Idaho, United States

- Unincorporated community
- Location within Idaho Location within the United States
- Coordinates: 42°30′51″N 114°41′16″W
- Country: United States
- State: Idaho
- County: Twin Falls
- Elevation: 4,114 ft (1,254 m)
- Time zone: UTC-7 (Mountain (MST))
  - Summer (DST): UTC-6 (MDT)
- ZIP Code: 83316
- GNIS feature ID: 396309

Clover is an unincorporated community in Twin Falls County, Idaho, United States, roughly 6 miles (9.7 km) south-southwest of Filer.

Clover is part of the Twin Falls metropolitan area.
