= Rock Creek, Idaho =

Unincorporated community in Twin Falls County, Idaho, United States

- Unincorporated community
- Location within Idaho Location within the United States
- Coordinates: 42°35′38″N 114°42′20″W
- Country: United States
- State: Idaho
- County: Twin Falls
- Elevation: 4,108 ft (1,252 m)
- Time zone: UTC-7 (Mountain (MST))
  - Summer (DST): UTC-6 (MDT)
- ZIP Code: 83334
- GNIS feature ID: 398056

Rock Creek is an unincorporated community in Twin Falls County, Idaho, United States, roughly 12 miles (19 km) southeast of Twin Falls. Rock Creek had a post office 1871–1975.

Rock Creek is part of the Twin Falls, Idaho Metropolitan Statistical Area.
