= Castleford (disambiguation) =

Castleford is a town in West Yorkshire, England.

Castleford may also refer to:

== Associated with the English town ==
- Castleford Tigers, a rugby league club
- Castleford High School Technology and Sports College, a high school
- Castleford railway station

== Other places ==
- Castleford, Idaho, in the United States
- Castleford, Ontario, Canada, a community in Horton Township
