= Godwin, Idaho =

Unincorporated community in Twin Falls County, Idaho, United States

- Unincorporated community
- Location within Idaho Location within the United States
- Coordinates: 42°40′46″N 114°34′29″W
- Country: United States
- State: Idaho
- County: Twin Falls
- Elevation: 4,049 ft (1,234 m)
- Time zone: UTC-7 (Mountain (MST))
  - Summer (DST): UTC-6 (MDT)
- ZIP Code: 83328
- GNIS feature ID: 396562

Godwin is an unincorporated community in Twin Falls County, Idaho, United States, roughly 6 miles (9.7 km) southwest of Twin Falls. Godwin is located at the junction of U.S. Route 93 and Idaho State Highway 74.

Godwin is part of the Twin Falls, Idaho Metropolitan Statistical Area.
