= Kimberly, Idaho =

- City
- Motto: "A community working together to make a difference"
- Location of Kimberly in Twin Falls County, Idaho.
- Coordinates: 42°31′59″N 114°22′25″W
- Country: United States
- State: Idaho
- County: Twin Falls
- Founded: 1905

Area
  - Total: 1.79 sq mi (4.63 km^{2})
  - Land: 1.79 sq mi (4.63 km^{2})
  - Water: 0 sq mi (0.00 km^{2})
- Elevation: 3,914 ft (1,193 m)

Population (2020)
  - Total: 4,626
  - Density: 2,270.0/sq mi (876.44/km^{2})
- Time zone: UTC-7 (Mountain (MST))
  - Summer (DST): UTC-6 (MDT)
- ZIP code: 83341
- Area codes: 208, 986
- FIPS code: 16-43570
- GNIS feature ID: 2411543
- Website: www.cityofkimberly.org

Kimberly is a city in Twin Falls County, Idaho, United States. The population was 4,626 at the 2020 census, up from 3,264 in 2010. It is part of the Twin Falls Metropolitan Statistical Area.

Kimberly was founded in 1905. It is named after Peter L. Kimberly, a major investor in the construction of Milner Dam which made commercial irrigation practical in the area.

== Geography ==
According to the United States Census Bureau, the city has a total area of 1.61 square miles (4.17 km^{2}), all of it land.

== Education ==
Kimberly is served by the Kimberly School District, designated #414. The district contains Kimberly Elementary School, Stricker Elementary School, Rise Charter School, Kimberly Middle School, and Kimberly High School.

== Demographics ==
Historical population
Census	Pop.	Note	%±
1920	601		—
1930	648		7.8%
1940	963		48.6%
1950	1,347		39.9%
1960	1,298		−3.6%
1970	1,557		20.0%
1980	2,307		48.2%
1990	2,367		2.6%
2000	2,614		10.4%
2010	3,264		24.9%
2020	4,626		41.7%
U.S. Decennial Census

=== 2020 census ===
As of the 2020 census, Kimberly had a population of 4,626. The median age was 32.0 years. 34.3% of residents were under the age of 18 and 12.7% of residents were 65 years of age or older. For every 100 females there were 101.3 males, and for every 100 females age 18 and over there were 96.4 males age 18 and over.

99.7% of residents lived in urban areas, while 0.3% lived in rural areas.

There were 1,451 households in Kimberly, of which 47.6% had children under the age of 18 living in them. Of all households, 58.4% were married-couple households, 14.0% were households with a male householder and no spouse or partner present, and 20.6% were households with a female householder and no spouse or partner present. About 17.6% of all households were made up of individuals and 8.2% had someone living alone who was 65 years of age or older.

There were 1,502 housing units, of which 3.4% were vacant. The homeowner vacancy rate was 0.8% and the rental vacancy rate was 7.8%.

Racial composition as of the 2020 census
Race	Number	Percent
White	3,800	82.1%
Black or African American	15	0.3%
American Indian and Alaska Native	56	1.2%
Asian	17	0.4%
Native Hawaiian and Other Pacific Islander	0	0.0%
Some other race	399	8.6%
Two or more races	339	7.3%
Hispanic or Latino (of any race)	843	18.2%

=== 2010 census ===
As of the census of 2010, there were 3,264 people, 1,123 households, and 835 families residing in the city. The population density was 2,027.3 inhabitants per square mile (782.7/km^{2}). There were 1,190 housing units at an average density of 739.1 per square mile (285.4/km^{2}). The racial makeup of the city was 91.8% White, 0.2% African American, 1.0% Native American, 0.3% Asian, 0.1% Pacific Islander, 4.7% from other races, and 2.0% from two or more races. Hispanic or Latino of any race were 12.5% of the population.

There were 1,123 households, of which 44.3% had children under the age of 18 living with them, 58.3% were married couples living together, 11.1% had a female householder with no husband present, 4.9% had a male householder with no wife present, and 25.6% were non-families. 21.8% of all households were made up of individuals, and 9.3% had someone living alone who was 65 years of age or older. The average household size was 2.87 and the average family size was 3.38.

The median age in the city was 31.9 years. 32.4% of residents were under the age of 18; 8% were between the ages of 18 and 24; 26.8% were from 25 to 44; 21.7% were from 45 to 64; and 11.1% were 65 years of age or older. The gender makeup of the city was 49.6% male and 50.4% female.

=== 2000 census ===
As of the census of 2000, there were 2,614 people, 916 households, and 690 families residing in the city. The population density was 3,187.6 inhabitants per square mile (1,230.7/km^{2}). There were 965 housing units at an average density of 1,176.8 per square mile (454.4/km^{2}). The racial makeup of the city was 94.99% White, 0.08% African American, 0.92% Native American, 0.87% Asian, 0.09% Pacific Islander, 1.57% from other races, and 1.95% from two or more races. Hispanic or Latino of any race were 4.93% of the population.

There were 916 households, out of which 40.2% had children under the age of 18 living with them, 68.7% were married couples living together, 19.0% had a female householder with no husband present, and 21.7% were non-families. 21.3% of all households were made up of individuals, and 11.4% had someone living alone who was 65 years of age or older. The average household size was 2.80 and the average family size was 3.29.

In the city, the population was spread out, with 33.8% under the age of 19, 5.7% from 20 to 24, 28% from 25 to 44, 18.5% from 45 to 64, and 13.9% who were 65 years of age or older. The median age was 33.5 years. For every 100 females, there were 95 males. For every 100 females age 18 and over, there were 90.1 males.

The median income for a household in the city was $33,906, and the median income for a family was $39,856. Males had a median income of $29,650 versus $19,757 for females. The per capita income for the city was $13,545. About 6.7% of families and 8.7% of the population were below the poverty line, including 10.3% of those under age 18 and 6.8% of those age 65 or over.

== See also ==
- List of cities in Idaho
