= Deep Creek, Idaho =

Unincorporated community in Twin Falls County, Idaho, United States

- Unincorporated community
- Location within Idaho Location within the United States
- Coordinates: 42°35′38″N 114°42′20″W
- Country: United States
- State: Idaho
- County: Twin Falls
- Elevation: 3,776 ft (1,151 m)
- Time zone: UTC-7 (Mountain (MST))
  - Summer (DST): UTC-6 (MDT)
- ZIP Code: 83316
- GNIS feature ID: 396255

Deep Creek is an unincorporated community in Twin Falls County, Idaho, United States, roughly 4 miles (6.4 km) west of Buhl. Deep Creek had a post office 1909–1913.

Deep Creek is part of the Twin Falls, Idaho Metropolitan Statistical Area.
