= Willow Creek Summit =

- Location within the United States Location within Idaho
- Elevation: 7,161 ft (2,183 m)
- Traversed by: US 93

Third Approach
- Location: Custer County, Idaho, United States
- Range: Lost River Range; Rocky Mountains
- Coordinates: 44.231°N 113.975°W

Willow Creek Summit is a mountain pass in the western United States in central Idaho, at an elevation of 7,161 feet (2,183 m) above sea level. Traversed by US 93, it is located below the Lost River Range, in northeastern Custer County, within the Challis National Forest.

It marks the divide between the Big Lost River and Salmon River drainage areas. Borah Peak, the highest point in the state at 12,662 feet (3,859 m), is southeast of Willow Creek Summit.
