= Knull, Idaho =

Unincorporated community in Twin Falls County, Idaho, United States

- Unincorporated community
- Location within Idaho Location within the United States
- Coordinates: 42°31′35″N 114°33′19″W
- Country: United States
- State: Idaho
- County: Twin Falls
- Elevation: 3,980 ft (1,210 m)
- Time zone: UTC-7 (Mountain (MST))
  - Summer (DST): UTC-6 (MDT)
- ZIP Code: 83301
- GNIS feature ID: 396753

Knull is an unincorporated community in Twin Falls County, Idaho, United States, roughly 7.75 miles (12.47 km) southwest of Twin Falls.

Knull is part of the Twin Falls, Idaho Metropolitan Statistical Area.
