= Caldron Linn (Idaho) =

Waterfall in Idaho, United States

Cauldron Linn
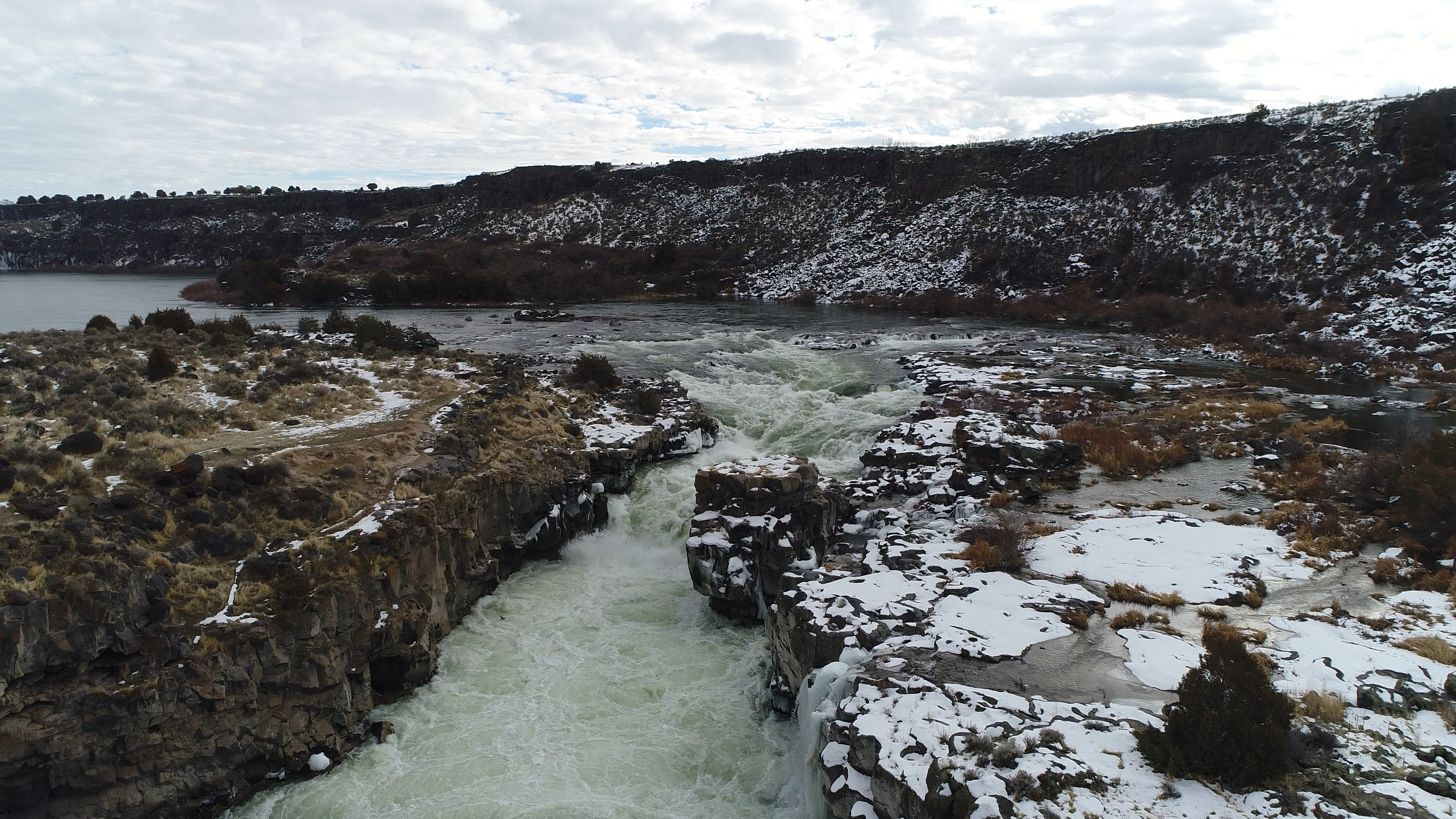
- Interactive map of Cauldron Linn
- Coordinates: 42.4958°N 114.1296°W
- Elevation: 3,945 feet (1,202 m)
- Total height: 25 feet (8 m)
- Watercourse: Snake River

Location in the United States
Location in Idaho

Caldron Linn, or Cauldron Linn, also known as Star Falls, is a waterfall on the Snake River in Jerome County and Twin Falls County of southern Idaho.

Caldron Linn was a key site of the Overland Party of the Pacific Fur Company, an expedition to the Pacific Ocean led by Wilson Price Hunt. The expedition attempted to canoe down the Snake River in 1811 and had already lost one of their party to the river when they encountered the waterfall. The churning waters of the falls inspired the expedition to abandon the river and continue on land to the Pacific. The falls most likely were named by a Scottish member of the party, there being a waterfall in Scotland of the same name. East of present-day Murtaugh and South of Hazelton, the waterfall was added to the National Register of Historic Places in 1972 for its role in the expedition.

== See also ==
- List of waterfalls in Idaho
- Jerome County
- Twin Falls County
