= Curry, Idaho =

Unincorporated community in Twin Falls County, Idaho, United States

- Unincorporated community
- Location within Idaho Location within the United States
- Coordinates: 42°33′50″N 114°33′19″W
- Country: United States
- State: Idaho
- County: Twin Falls
- Elevation: 3,744 ft (1,141 m)
- Time zone: UTC-7 (Mountain (MST))
  - Summer (DST): UTC-6 (MDT)
- ZIP Code: 396355
- GNIS feature ID: 396039

Curry is an unincorporated community in Twin Falls County, Idaho, United States, roughly 5 miles (8.0 km) west of Twin Falls. Curry is located along U.S. Route 30.

Curry is part of the Twin Falls, Idaho Metropolitan Statistical Area.
