= Hollister, Idaho =

- City
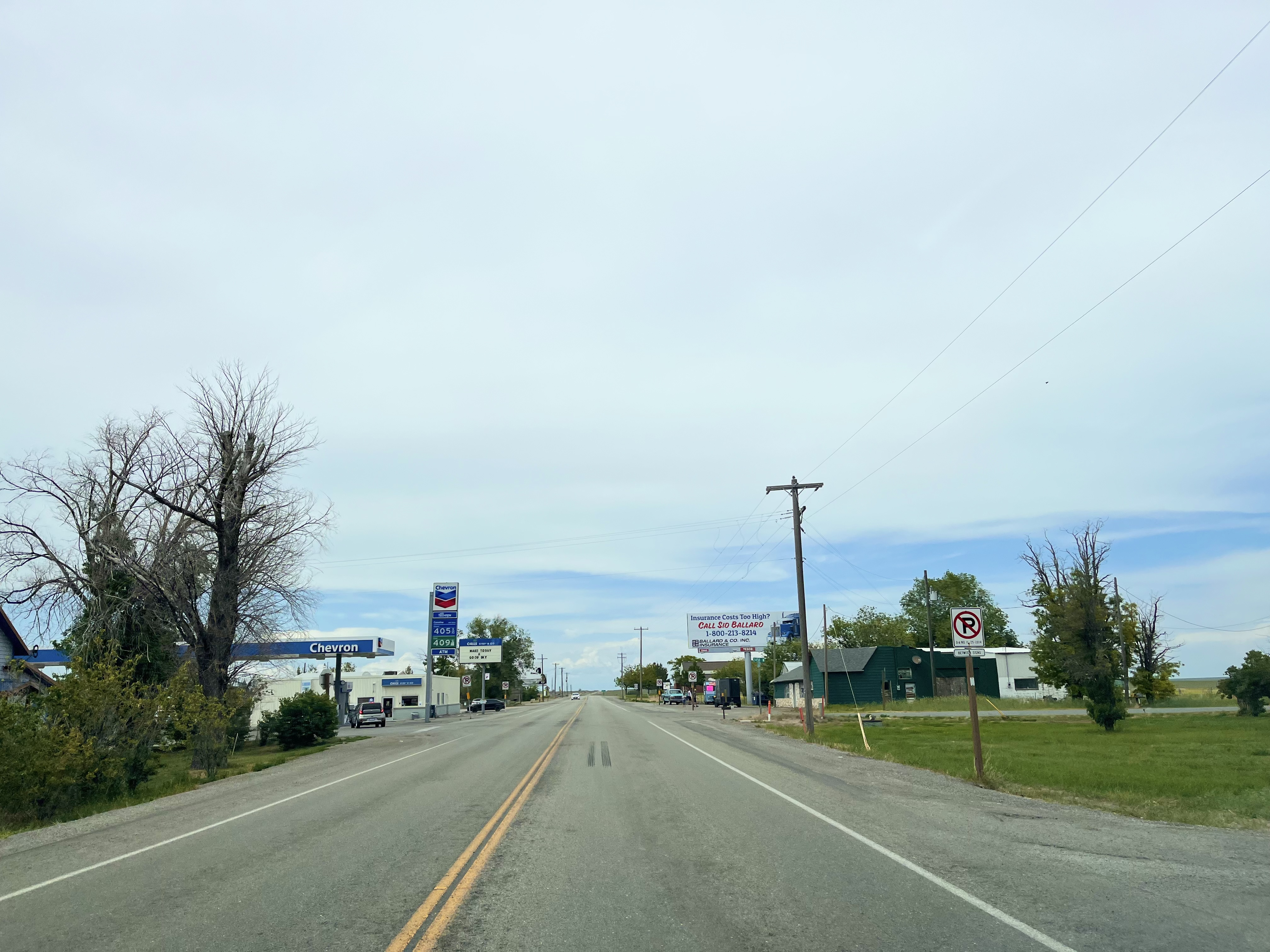

- Location of Hollister in Twin Falls County, Idaho.
- Coordinates: 42°21′10″N 114°35′02″W
- Country: United States
- State: Idaho
- County: Twin Falls

Area
  - Total: 1.07 sq mi (2.8 km^{2})
  - Land: 1.07 sq mi (2.8 km^{2})
  - Water: 0.00 sq mi (0 km^{2})
- Elevation: 4,528 ft (1,380 m)

Population (2020)
  - Total: 243
  - Estimate (2022): 263
  - Density: 288.6/sq mi (111.41/km^{2})
- Time zone: UTC-7 (Mountain (MST))
  - Summer (DST): UTC-6 (MDT)
- ZIP Code: 83301
- Area codes: 208, 986
- FIPS code: 16-38080
- GNIS feature ID: 2410779
- Website: hollisteridaho.com

Hollister is a city in Twin Falls County, Idaho, United States. The population was 272 at the 2020 census. It is part of the Twin Falls, Idaho Metropolitan Statistical Area.

== Geography ==
Hollister is located on the east bank of Salmon Falls Creek.

According to the United States Census Bureau, the city has a total area of 1.07 square miles (2.77 km^{2}), all of it land.

== Climate ==
According to the Köppen climate classification system, Hollister has a cold semi-arid climate, abbreviated "BSk" on climate maps. The hottest temperature recorded in Hollister was 108 °F (42.2 °C) on July 14, 1922, while the coldest temperature recorded was −29 °F (−33.9 °C) on January 8, 1937.

Climate data for Hollister, Idaho, 1981–2010 normals, extremes 1912–2020
Month	Jan	Feb	Mar	Apr	May	Jun	Jul	Aug	Sep	Oct	Nov	Dec	Year
Record high °F (°C)	63 (17)	72 (22)	76 (24)	88 (31)	99 (37)	106 (41)	108 (42)	106 (41)	97 (36)	88 (31)	77 (25)	71 (22)	108 (42)
Mean daily maximum °F (°C)	38.7 (3.7)	42.8 (6.0)	52.5 (11.4)	60.0 (15.6)	69.1 (20.6)	77.6 (25.3)	86.9 (30.5)	85.8 (29.9)	76.3 (24.6)	63.5 (17.5)	49.0 (9.4)	38.5 (3.6)	61.7 (16.5)
Daily mean °F (°C)	29.8 (−1.2)	32.1 (0.1)	40.2 (4.6)	46.5 (8.1)	54.8 (12.7)	62.5 (16.9)	71.0 (21.7)	70.1 (21.2)	61.3 (16.3)	49.7 (9.8)	37.8 (3.2)	28.5 (−1.9)	48.7 (9.3)
Mean daily minimum °F (°C)	20.8 (−6.2)	21.4 (−5.9)	27.8 (−2.3)	33.0 (0.6)	40.4 (4.7)	47.4 (8.6)	55.0 (12.8)	54.3 (12.4)	46.2 (7.9)	35.8 (2.1)	26.5 (−3.1)	18.4 (−7.6)	35.6 (2.0)
Record low °F (°C)	−29 (−34)	−23 (−31)	−4 (−20)	3 (−16)	18 (−8)	23 (−5)	33 (1)	27 (−3)	13 (−11)	1 (−17)	−11 (−24)	−27 (−33)	−29 (−34)
Average precipitation inches (mm)	1.07 (27)	0.75 (19)	1.00 (25)	1.13 (29)	1.36 (35)	0.99 (25)	0.33 (8.4)	0.41 (10)	0.55 (14)	0.84 (21)	1.00 (25)	1.21 (31)	10.64 (269.4)
Source 1: NOAA
Source 2: National Weather Service

== Demographics ==
Historical population
Census	Pop.	Note	%±
1920	159		—
1930	113		−28.9%
1940	100		−11.5%
1950	80		−20.0%
1960	60		−25.0%
1970	57		−5.0%
1980	167		193.0%
1990	144		−13.8%
2000	237		64.6%
2010	272		14.8%
2020	243		−10.7%
2019 (est.)	309		13.6%
U.S. Decennial Census

=== 2010 census ===
As of the census of 2010, there were 272 people, 92 households, and 64 families residing in the city. The population density was 254.2 inhabitants per square mile (98.1/km^{2}). There were 100 housing units at an average density of 93.5 per square mile (36.1/km^{2}). The racial makeup of the city was 83.1% White, 0.4% Native American, 12.1% from other races, and 4.4% from two or more races. Hispanic or Latino of any race were 29.0% of the population.

There were 92 households, of which 38.0% had children under the age of 18 living with them, 60.9% were married couples living together, 3.3% had a female householder with no husband present, 5.4% had a male householder with no wife present, and 30.4% were non-families. 20.7% of all households were made up of individuals, and 8.7% had someone living alone who was 65 years of age or older. The average household size was 2.96 and the average family size was 3.41.

The median age in the city was 39 years. 29.8% of residents were under the age of 18; 6.9% were between the ages of 18 and 24; 22.1% were from 25 to 44; 26.2% were from 45 to 64; and 15.1% were 65 years of age or older. The gender makeup of the city was 49.6% male and 50.4% female.

=== 2000 census ===
As of the census of 2000, there were 237 people, 80 households, and 58 families residing in the city. The population density was 237.6 inhabitants per square mile (91.7/km^{2}). There were 89 housing units at an average density of 89.2 per square mile (34.4/km^{2}). The racial makeup of the city was 85.23% White, 2.95% Native American, 9.28% from other races, and 2.53% from two or more races. Hispanic or Latino of any race were 18.57% of the population.

There were 80 households, out of which 42.5% had children under the age of 18 living with them, 63.8% were married couples living together, 6.3% had a female householder with no husband present, and 27.5% were non-families. 17.5% of all households were made up of individuals, and 6.3% had someone living alone who was 65 years of age or older. The average household size was 2.96 and the average family size was 3.41.

In the city, the population was spread out, with 32.9% under the age of 18, 8.0% from 18 to 24, 29.1% from 25 to 44, 21.9% from 45 to 64, and 8.0% who were 65 years of age or older. The median age was 34 years. For every 100 females, there were 94.3 males. For every 100 females age 18 and over, there were 103.8 males.

The median income for a household in the city was $27,375, and the median income for a family was $29,688. Males had a median income of $25,313 versus $15,556 for females. The per capita income for the city was $11,870. About 7.8% of families and 11.0% of the population were below the poverty line, including none of those under the age of eighteen or sixty five or over.

== Education ==
Hollister Charter School accommodates pupils in grades K-6. After sixth grade, local pupils attend Filer Middle School in Filer, about 18 miles (29 km) north of Hollister.
