= Hansen, Idaho =

- City
- Location of Hansen in Twin Falls County, Idaho
- Coordinates: 42°31′53″N 114°18′04″W
- Country: United States
- State: Idaho
- County: Twin Falls
- Plated in: 1905

Area
  - Total: 0.35 sq mi (0.90 km^{2})
  - Land: 0.35 sq mi (0.90 km^{2})
  - Water: 0 sq mi (0.00 km^{2})
- Elevation: 4,026 ft (1,227 m)

Population (2020)
  - Total: 1,086
  - Density: 3,679.1/sq mi (1,420.51/km^{2})
- Time zone: UTC-7 (Mountain (MST))
  - Summer (DST): UTC-6 (MDT)
- ZIP code: 83334
- Area codes: 208, 986
- FIPS code: 16-34930
- GNIS feature ID: 2410697
- Website: cityofhansen.org

Hansen is a city in Twin Falls County, Idaho, United States. The population was 1,086 at the 2020 census, and 1,144 at the 2010 census. It is part of the Twin Falls, Idaho Micropolitan Statistical Area.

== History ==
Early settlement in the area that would later become Hansen developed alongside transportation and freight routes that served travelers moving through southern Idaho in the late nineteenth century, including stops along the Oregon Trail and the Kelton Road, which supported migration, commerce, and supply traffic throughout the region.

The town was named in honor of the a settler and merchant known as John Hansen, a Danish immigrant who became a notable civic figure in the nearby town of Rock Creek. The city was plated in 1905, during a period when regional irrigation projects were expanding agricultural opportunities and encouraging the development of small communities throughout the Magic Valley.

Nearby historic sites such as the Rock Creek Station and Stricker Homesite document the movement of settlers, stage lines, and freight companies, and illustrate the broader historical context in which settlements in Twin Falls County emerged.

== Geography ==
According to the United States Census Bureau, the city has a total area of 0.38 square miles (0.98 km^{2}), all of it land.

== Demographics ==
Historical population
| Census | Pop. | Note | %± |
|---|---|---|---|
| 1920 | 278 | | — |
| 1930 | 379 | | 36.3% |
| 1940 | 527 | | 39.1% |
| 1950 | 463 | | −12.1% |
| 1960 | 427 | | −7.8% |
| 1970 | 415 | | −2.8% |
| 1980 | 1,078 | | 159.8% |
| 1990 | 848 | | −21.3% |
| 2000 | 970 | | 14.4% |
| 2010 | 1,144 | | 17.9% |
| 2020 | 1,086 | | −5.1% |
| 2019 (est.) | 1,284 | | 12.2% |
U.S. Decennial Census

=== 2020 census ===
As of the 2020 census, Hansen had a population of 1,086. The median age was 37.5 years. 24.2% of residents were under the age of 18 and 17.5% of residents were 65 years of age or older. For every 100 females there were 97.8 males, and for every 100 females age 18 and over there were 94.1 males age 18 and over.

0.0% of residents lived in urban areas, while 100.0% lived in rural areas.

There were 418 households in Hansen, of which 33.5% had children under the age of 18 living in them. Of all households, 48.1% were married-couple households, 19.9% were households with a male householder and no spouse or partner present, and 23.7% were households with a female householder and no spouse or partner present. About 25.6% of all households were made up of individuals and 12.2% had someone living alone who was 65 years of age or older.

There were 437 housing units, of which 4.3% were vacant. The homeowner vacancy rate was 0.3% and the rental vacancy rate was 5.0%.

Racial composition as of the 2020 census
| Race | Number | Percent |
|---|---|---|
| White | 846 | 77.9% |
| Black or African American | 6 | 0.6% |
| American Indian and Alaska Native | 16 | 1.5% |
| Asian | 1 | 0.1% |
| Native Hawaiian and Other Pacific Islander | 0 | 0.0% |
| Some other race | 132 | 12.2% |
| Two or more races | 85 | 7.8% |
| Hispanic or Latino (of any race) | 238 | 21.9% |

=== 2010 census ===
As of the census of 2010, there were 1,144 people, 395 households, and 293 families residing in the city. The population density was 3,010.5 inhabitants per square mile (1,162.4/km^{2}). There were 430 housing units at an average density of 1,131.6 per square mile (436.9/km^{2}). The racial makeup of the city was 85.0% White, 0.3% African American, 1.2% Native American, 0.2% Asian, 9.8% from other races, and 3.5% from two or more races. Hispanic or Latino people of any race were 16.5% of the population.

There were 395 households, of which 42.8% had children under the age of 18 living with them, 55.9% were married couples living together, 11.1% had a female householder with no husband present, 7.1% had a male householder with no wife present, and 25.8% were non-families. 22.0% of all households were made up of individuals, and 10.6% had someone living alone who was 65 years of age or older. The average household size was 2.90 and the average family size was 3.40.

The median age in the city was 32 years. 33.8% of residents were under the age of 18; 6.6% were between the ages of 18 and 24; 26.1% were from 25 to 44; 21.9% were from 45 to 64; and 11.6% were 65 years of age or older. The gender makeup of the city was 49.7% male and 50.3% female.

=== 2000 census ===
As of the census of 2000, there were 970 people, 349 households, and 255 families residing in the city. The population density was 2,597.7 inhabitants per square mile (1,003.0/km^{2}). There were 378 housing units at an average density of 1,012.3 per square mile (390.9/km^{2}). The racial makeup of the city was 95.77% White, 0.31% African American, 0.82% Native American, 0.31% Asian, 0.10% Pacific Islander, 0.62% from other races, and 2.06% from two or more races. Hispanic or Latino people of any race were 5.26% of the population.

There were 349 households, out of which 39.3% had children under the age of 18 living with them, 56.4% were married couples living together, 11.5% had a female householder with no husband present, and 26.9% were non-families. 21.2% of all households were made up of individuals, and 9.5% had someone living alone who was 65 years of age or older. The average household size was 2.78 and the average family size was 3.23.

In the city, the population was spread out, with 31.8% under the age of 18, 9.2% from 18 to 24, 27.2% from 25 to 44, 21.1% from 45 to 64, and 10.7% who were 65 years of age or older. The median age was 32 years. For every 100 females, there were 98.0 males. For every 100 females age 18 and over, there were 95.3 males.

The median income for a household in the city was $29,125, and the median income for a family was $32,750. Males had a median income of $26,607 versus $18,750 for females. The per capita income for the city was $12,339. About 11.7% of families and 15.8% of the population were below the poverty line, including 17.8% of those under age 18 and 20.4% of those age 65 or over.

== See also ==
- List of cities in Idaho
