= Castleford, Idaho =

- City
- Location of Castleford in Twin Falls County, Idaho.
- Coordinates: 42°31′16″N 114°52′24″W
- Country: United States
- State: Idaho
- County: Twin Falls

Area
  - Total: 0.097 sq mi (0.25 km^{2})
  - Land: 0.097 sq mi (0.25 km^{2})
  - Water: 0 sq mi (0.00 km^{2})
- Elevation: 3,875 ft (1,181 m)

Population (2020)
  - Total: 215
  - Density: 2,611.4/sq mi (1,008.25/km^{2})
- Time zone: UTC-7 (Mountain (MST))
  - Summer (DST): UTC-6 (MDT)
- ZIP code: 83321
- Area codes: 208, 986
- FIPS code: 16-13240
- GNIS feature ID: 2409410
- Website: www.cityofcastleford.com

Castleford is a city in Twin Falls County, Idaho, United States. As of the 2020 census, Castleford had a population of 215. It is part of the Twin Falls, Idaho Micropolitan Statistical Area.

== Geography ==
Castleford is located on the west bank of Salmon Falls Creek.

According to the United States Census Bureau, the city has a total area of 0.09 square miles (0.23 km^{2}), all of it land.

=== Climate ===
According to the Köppen Climate Classification system, Castleford has a semi-arid climate, abbreviated "BSk" on climate maps.

Climate data for Castleford, Idaho, 1991–2020 normals, extremes 1963–2021
Month	Jan	Feb	Mar	Apr	May	Jun	Jul	Aug	Sep	Oct	Nov	Dec	Year
Record high °F (°C)	63 (17)	69 (21)	80 (27)	89 (32)	100 (38)	103 (39)	105 (41)	102 (39)	96 (36)	89 (32)	85 (29)	64 (18)	105 (41)
Mean maximum °F (°C)	51.8 (11.0)	57.2 (14.0)	69.7 (20.9)	79.0 (26.1)	86.3 (30.2)	93.3 (34.1)	97.3 (36.3)	95.3 (35.2)	90.2 (32.3)	80.5 (26.9)	64.7 (18.2)	52.0 (11.1)	97.8 (36.6)
Mean daily maximum °F (°C)	36.1 (2.3)	42.1 (5.6)	52.9 (11.6)	60.1 (15.6)	69.5 (20.8)	78.4 (25.8)	87.9 (31.1)	85.9 (29.9)	76.3 (24.6)	62.0 (16.7)	46.5 (8.1)	35.3 (1.8)	61.1 (16.2)
Daily mean °F (°C)	28.2 (−2.1)	32.6 (0.3)	40.6 (4.8)	46.5 (8.1)	55.0 (12.8)	62.8 (17.1)	70.8 (21.6)	68.9 (20.5)	60.2 (15.7)	48.4 (9.1)	36.0 (2.2)	27.2 (−2.7)	48.1 (9.0)
Mean daily minimum °F (°C)	20.3 (−6.5)	23.1 (−4.9)	28.3 (−2.1)	32.9 (0.5)	40.6 (4.8)	47.1 (8.4)	53.8 (12.1)	51.9 (11.1)	44.2 (6.8)	34.8 (1.6)	25.6 (−3.6)	19.2 (−7.1)	35.2 (1.8)
Mean minimum °F (°C)	5.8 (−14.6)	10.1 (−12.2)	18.8 (−7.3)	22.8 (−5.1)	30.3 (−0.9)	36.5 (2.5)	45.3 (7.4)	42.2 (5.7)	33.2 (0.7)	23.0 (−5.0)	11.4 (−11.4)	5.3 (−14.8)	−0.7 (−18.2)
Record low °F (°C)	−23 (−31)	−14 (−26)	0 (−18)	12 (−11)	22 (−6)	30 (−1)	34 (1)	33 (1)	15 (−9)	4 (−16)	−10 (−23)	−26 (−32)	−26 (−32)
Average precipitation inches (mm)	1.22 (31)	1.05 (27)	0.96 (24)	1.21 (31)	1.43 (36)	0.75 (19)	0.24 (6.1)	0.34 (8.6)	0.50 (13)	0.78 (20)	0.94 (24)	1.30 (33)	10.72 (272.7)
Average snowfall inches (cm)	4.6 (12)	2.5 (6.4)	0.8 (2.0)	0.2 (0.51)	0.0 (0.0)	0.0 (0.0)	0.0 (0.0)	0.0 (0.0)	0.0 (0.0)	0.2 (0.51)	2.2 (5.6)	4.9 (12)	15.4 (39.02)
Average precipitation days (≥ 0.01 in)	5.7	5.7	6.5	6.0	5.8	4.5	1.7	1.5	2.2	3.6	6.3	5.7	55.2
Average snowy days (≥ 0.1 in)	2.5	1.4	0.7	0.2	0.0	0.0	0.0	0.0	0.0	0.1	1.2	2.8	8.9
Source 1: NOAA (precip days, snow/snow days 1981–2010)
Source 2: National Weather Service

== Demographics ==
Historical population
Census	Pop.	Note	%±
1960	274		—
1970	174		−36.5%
1980	191		9.8%
1990	179		−6.3%
2000	277		54.7%
2010	226		−18.4%
2020	215		−4.9%
U.S. Decennial Census

=== 2010 census ===
As of the census of 2010, there were 226 people, 90 households, and 48 families residing in the city. The population density was 2,511.1 inhabitants per square mile (969.5/km^{2}). There were 103 housing units at an average density of 1,144.4 per square mile (441.9/km^{2}). The racial makeup of the city was 87.6% White, 0.4% Asian, 8.8% from other races, and 3.1% from two or more races. Hispanic or Latino of any race were 35.0% of the population.

There were 90 households, of which 31.1% had children under the age of 18 living with them, 41.1% were married couples living together, 6.7% had a female householder with no husband present, 5.6% had a male householder with no wife present, and 46.7% were non-families. 37.8% of all households were made up of individuals, and 14.5% had someone living alone who was 65 years of age or older. The average household size was 2.51 and the average family size was 3.56.

The median age in the city was 33.7 years. 26.1% of residents were under the age of 18; 12.8% were between the ages of 18 and 24; 27% were from 25 to 44; 21.7% were from 45 to 64; and 12.4% were 65 years of age or older. The gender makeup of the city was 50.4% male and 49.6% female.

=== 2000 census ===
As of the census of 2000, there were 277 people, 95 households, and 62 families residing in the city. The population density was 2,971.5 inhabitants per square mile (1,147.3/km^{2}). There were 105 housing units at an average density of 1,126.4 per square mile (434.9/km^{2}). The racial makeup of the city was 80.14% White, 0.36% African American, 1.08% Native American, 0.36% Pacific Islander, 14.08% from other races, and 3.97% from two or more races. Hispanic or Latino of any race were 38.27% of the population.

There were 95 households, out of which 40.0% had children under the age of 18 living with them, 49.5% were married couples living together, 13.7% had a female householder with no husband present, and 33.7% were non-families. 27.4% of all households were made up of individuals, and 13.7% had someone living alone who was 65 years of age or older. The average household size was 2.92 and the average family size was 3.60.

In the city, the population was spread out, with 37.9% under the age of 18, 7.6% from 18 to 24, 23.8% from 25 to 44, 19.9% from 45 to 64, and 10.8% who were 65 years of age or older. The median age was 28 years. For every 100 females, there were 83.4 males. For every 100 females age 18 and over, there were 77.3 males.

The median income for a household in the city was $22,083, and the median income for a family was $26,250. Males had a median income of $22,679 versus $16,875 for females. The per capita income for the city was $9,046. About 32.7% of families and 35.1% of the population were below the poverty line, including 48.8% of those under the age of eighteen and 38.2% of those 65 or over.

== See also ==
- List of cities in Idaho
