= Twin Falls County, Idaho =

County in Idaho, United States

- County
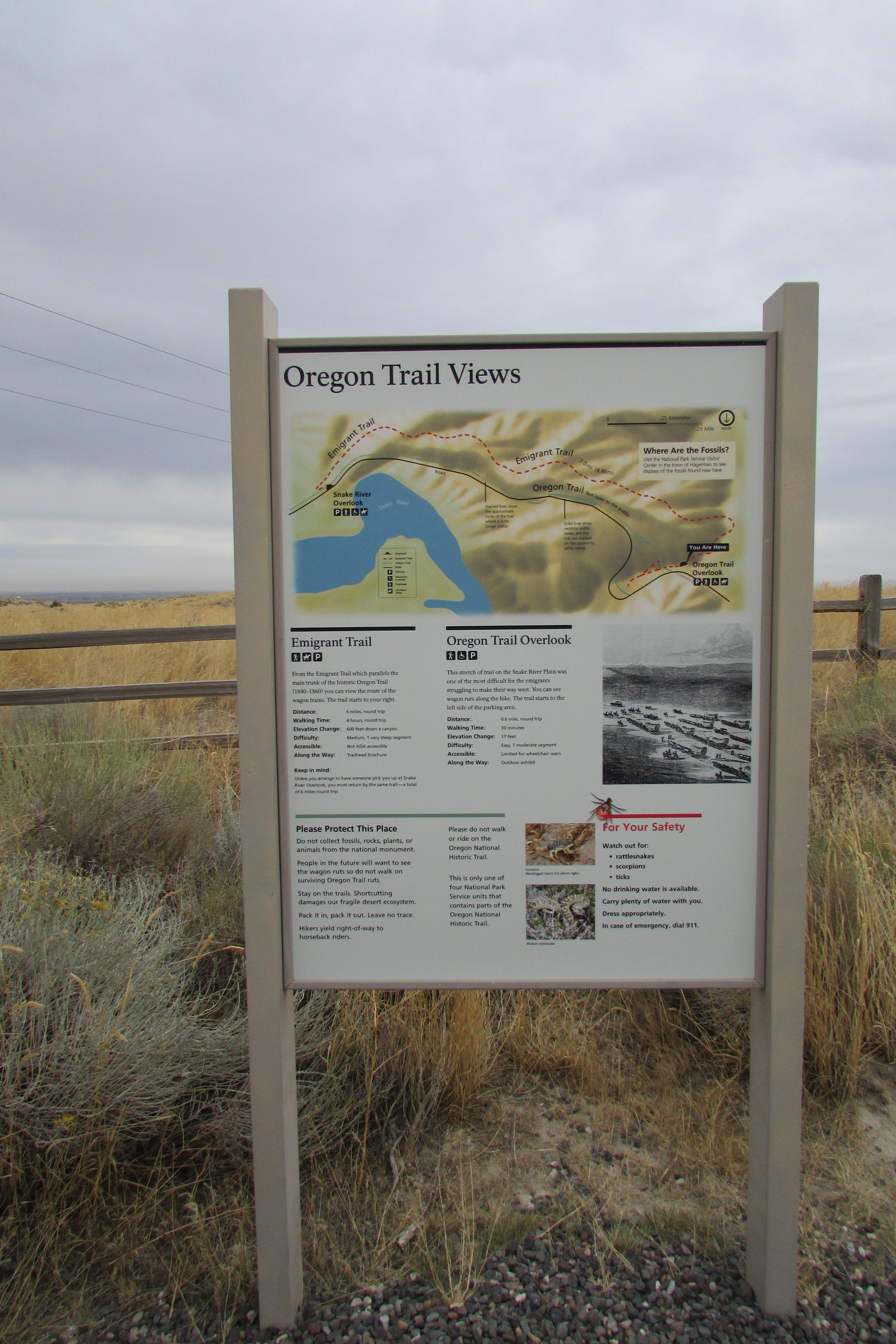
- Oregon Trail Wayside in Hagerman Fossil Beds National Monument

- Seal

- Location within the U.S. state of Idaho
- Coordinates: 42°21′N 114°40′W
- Country: United States
- State: Idaho
- Founded: February 21, 1907
- Named for: Snake River waterfall
- Seat: Twin Falls
- Largest city: Twin Falls

Area
  - Total: 1,928 sq mi (4,990 km^{2})
  - Land: 1,921 sq mi (4,980 km^{2})
  - Water: 7.1 sq mi (18 km^{2}) 0.4%

Population (2020)
  - Total: 90,046
  - Estimate (2025): 97,539 ▲
  - Density: 47/sq mi (18/km^{2})
- Time zone: UTC−7 (Mountain)
  - Summer (DST): UTC−6 (MDT)
- Congressional district: 2nd
- Website: www.twinfallscounty.org

Twin Falls County is a county in the south central part of the U.S. state of Idaho. As of the 2020 census, the population was 90,046, making it the fifth-most populous county in Idaho. The county seat and largest city is Twin Falls. Twin Falls County is part of the Twin Falls, ID Metropolitan Statistical Area.

Prior to the 1860s, the Twin Falls County area was an unorganized part of Shoshone lands, then as part of the Oregon Country. The area was first organized as part of the original Owyhee County in 1864 as part of Idaho Territory. In 1879, it was partitioned away from Owyhee County to form part of Cassia County. The county is named for a split waterfall on the Snake River of the same name. The Snake River is the county's northern boundary.

Even after Idaho became a state in 1890, the Twin Falls area was very sparsely populated and without significant settlements. That changed after the city of Twin Falls was founded in 1904, and Milner Dam was completed in 1905. Most of the county's other towns were established during this period as well. In response to local government needs for these new communities, which were as much as 80 miles (130 km) away from Cassia County's seat at Albion, Twin Falls County was created by the Idaho Legislature on February 21, 1907.

== Geography ==
According to the United States Census Bureau, the county has a total area of 1,928 square miles (4,990 km^{2}), of which 1,921 square miles (4,980 km^{2}) is land and 7.1 square miles (18 km^{2}) (0.4%) is water.

=== Adjacent counties ===
- Gooding County - north
- Jerome County - northeast
- Cassia County - east
- Elko County, Nevada - south/Pacific Time Border
- Owyhee County - west
- Elmore County - northwest

=== Major highways ===
- US 30
- US 93
- SH-50
- SH-74

=== National protected areas ===
- Hagerman Fossil Beds National Monument
- Sawtooth National Forest (part)

== Demographics ==
Historical population
Census	Pop.	Note	%±
1910	13,543		—
1920	28,398		109.7%
1930	29,828		5.0%
1940	36,403		22.0%
1950	40,979		12.6%
1960	41,842		2.1%
1970	41,807		−0.1%
1980	52,927		26.6%
1990	53,580		1.2%
2000	64,284		20.0%
2010	77,230		20.1%
2020	90,046		16.6%
2025 (est.)	97,539	▲	8.3%
U.S. Decennial Census; 1790–1960, 1900–1990, 1990–2000, 2010–2020,

=== Racial and ethnic composition ===
Twin Falls County, Idaho – Racial and ethnic composition Note: the US Census treats Hispanic/Latino as an ethnic category. This table excludes Latinos from the racial categories and assigns them to a separate category. Hispanics/Latinos may be of any race.
Race / Ethnicity (NH = Non-Hispanic)	Pop 1980	Pop 1990	Pop 2000	Pop 2010	Pop 2020	% 1980	% 1990	% 2000	% 2010	% 2020
White alone (NH)	49,927	49,606	56,390	63,841	68,169	94.33%	92.58%	87.72%	82.66%	75.70%
Black or African American alone (NH)	41	62	97	307	1,021	0.08%	0.12%	0.15%	0.40%	1.13%
Native American or Alaska Native alone (NH)	244	273	382	428	499	0.46%	0.51%	0.59%	0.55%	0.55%
Asian alone (NH)	191	510	465	895	1,403	0.36%	0.95%	0.72%	1.16%	1.56%
Native Hawaiian or Pacific Islander alone (NH)	x	x	47	79	201	x	x	0.07%	0.10%	0.22%
Other race alone (NH)	193	23	44	65	267	0.36%	0.04%	0.07%	0.08%	0.30%
Mixed race or Multiracial (NH)	x	x	833	1,045	3,276	x	x	1.30%	1.35%	3.64%
Hispanic or Latino (any race)	2,331	3,106	6,026	10,570	15,210	4.40%	5.80%	9.37%	13.69%	16.89%
Total	52,927	53,580	64,284	77,230	90,046	100.00%	100.00%	100.00%	100.00%	100.00%

=== 2020 census ===
As of the 2020 census, the county had a population of 90,046 and a median age of 35.8 years. 27.3% of residents were under the age of 18, and 16.5% were 65 years of age or older. For every 100 females there were 98.1 males, and for every 100 females age 18 and over there were 96.1 males age 18 and over.

There were 32,761 households in the county, of which 34.4% had children under the age of 18 living with them, and 23.3% had a female householder with no spouse or partner present. About 24.5% of all households were made up of individuals, and 10.8% had someone living alone who was 65 years of age or older.

There were 34,693 housing units, of which 5.6% were vacant. Among occupied housing units, 68.0% were owner-occupied, and 32.0% were renter-occupied, with homeowner and rental vacancy rates of 1.1% and 5.8%, respectively.

The racial makeup of the county was 80.2% White, 1.2% Black or African American, 1.0% American Indian and Alaska Native, 1.6% Asian, 0.2% Native Hawaiian and Pacific Islander, 7.1% from some other race, and 8.7% from two or more races. Hispanic or Latino residents of any race comprised 16.9% of the population.

65.3% of residents lived in urban areas, while 34.7% lived in rural areas.

=== 2010 census ===
As of the 2010 census, there were 77,230 people, 28,760 households, and 19,954 families living in the county. The population density was 40.2 inhabitants per square mile (15.5/km^{2}). There were 31,072 housing units at an average density of 16.2 per square mile (6.3/km^{2}). The racial makeup of the county was 88.9% white, 1.2% Asian, 0.8% American Indian, 0.4% black or African American, 0.1% Pacific islander, 6.3% from other races, and 2.3% from two or more races. Those of Hispanic or Latino origin made up 13.7% of the population. In terms of ancestry, 20.2% were German, 14.5% were English, 10.8% were Irish, and 7.0% were American.

Of the 28,760 households, 35.4% had children under the age of 18 living with them, 54.1% were married couples living together, 10.5% had a female householder with no husband present, 30.6% were non-families, and 24.3% of all households were made up of individuals. The average household size was 2.65, and the average family size was 3.16. The median age was 34.4 years.

The median income for a household in the county was $42,455, and the median income for a family was $49,188. Males had a median income of $35,777 versus $26,257 for females. The per capita income for the county was $19,892. About 10.6% of families and 13.0% of the population were below the poverty line, including 16.9% of those under age 18 and 10.7% of those age 65 or over.

=== 2000 census ===
As of the 2000 census, there were 64,284 people, 23,853 households, and 16,959 families living in the county. The population density was 33 inhabitants per square mile (13/km^{2}). There were 25,595 housing units at an average density of 13 per square mile (5.0/km^{2}). The racial makeup of the county was 92.47% White, 0.19% Black or African American, 0.71% Native American, 0.76% Asian, 0.08% Pacific Islander, 3.77% from other races, and 2.02% from two or more races. 9.37% of the population were Hispanic or Latino of any race. 17.9% were of German, 17.7% English, 10.9% American and 7.3% Irish ancestry.

There were 23,853 households, out of which 34.70% had children under the age of 18 living with them, 58.00% were married couples living together, 9.20% had a female householder with no husband present, and 28.90% were non-families. 23.60% of all households were made up of individuals, and 10.40% had someone living alone who was 65 years of age or older. The average household size was 2.64, and the average family size was 3.13.

In the county, the population was spread out, with 27.90% under the age of 18, 10.40% from 18 to 24, 26.00% from 25 to 44, 21.50% from 45 to 64, and 14.30% who were 65 years of age or older. The median age was 35 years. For every 100 females, there were 96.50 males. For every 100 females age 18 and over, there were 93.70 males.

The median income for a household in the county was $34,506, and the median income for a family was $39,886. Males had a median income of $30,058 versus $20,825 for females. The per capita income for the county was $16,678. About 9.10% of families and 12.70% of the population were below the poverty line, including 16.00% of those under age 18 and 9.30% of those age 65 or over.

== Communities ==
=== Cities ===
- Buhl
- Castleford
- Filer
- Hansen
- Hollister
- Kimberly
- Murtaugh
- Twin Falls

=== Unincorporated communities ===
- Amsterdam
- Artesian City
- Caldron Linn
- Clover
- Curry
- Deep Creek
- Fairview
- Godwin
- Knull
- Peavey
- Milner Dam (Extends into Cassia County and Jerome County)
- Rock Creek
- Rogerson

== Politics ==
Twin Falls County leans heavily Republican; it has not voted for a Democratic presidential nominee since 1936, and even in the Democratic landslide of 1964, Barry Goldwater still carried Twin Falls by 20 percentage points.

United States presidential election results for Twin Falls County, Idaho
Year	Republican		Democratic		Third party(ies)	
Year	No.	%	No.	%	No.	%
1908	1,757	55.64%	1,051	33.28%	350	11.08%
1912	1,074	20.08%	1,741	32.55%	2,533	47.36%
1916	3,083	40.03%	3,974	51.60%	644	8.36%
1920	5,894	67.16%	2,882	32.84%	0	0.00%
1924	4,630	51.04%	1,641	18.09%	2,800	30.87%
1928	6,791	72.72%	2,471	26.46%	76	0.81%
1932	4,928	42.05%	6,395	54.57%	396	3.38%
1936	4,966	38.71%	7,476	58.28%	386	3.01%
1940	9,031	55.23%	7,286	44.56%	34	0.21%
1944	7,946	56.29%	6,128	43.41%	42	0.30%
1948	7,833	55.71%	6,019	42.81%	209	1.49%
1952	14,471	76.07%	4,548	23.91%	4	0.02%
1956	12,097	68.10%	5,666	31.90%	0	0.00%
1960	12,171	62.15%	7,413	37.85%	0	0.00%
1964	11,518	60.13%	7,638	39.87%	0	0.00%
1968	11,564	62.94%	4,001	21.78%	2,808	15.28%
1972	13,075	73.98%	3,344	18.92%	1,254	7.10%
1976	12,659	65.82%	6,085	31.64%	489	2.54%
1980	17,425	73.50%	4,835	20.39%	1,448	6.11%
1984	16,974	77.97%	4,567	20.98%	230	1.06%
1988	13,243	63.87%	7,078	34.14%	413	1.99%
1992	10,335	43.97%	6,593	28.05%	6,575	27.98%
1996	12,393	54.13%	6,826	29.81%	3,677	16.06%
2000	15,794	70.10%	5,777	25.64%	959	4.26%
2004	19,672	74.42%	6,458	24.43%	305	1.15%
2008	19,032	66.52%	8,621	30.13%	960	3.36%
2012	19,773	69.70%	7,541	26.58%	1,055	3.72%
2016	19,828	66.37%	6,233	20.86%	3,813	12.76%
2020	25,897	70.93%	9,391	25.72%	1,224	3.35%
2024	27,304	73.04%	9,064	24.25%	1,015	2.72%

== Education ==
School districts include:

- Bliss Joint School District 234
- Buhl Joint School District 412
- Cassia County Joint School District 151
- Castleford School District 417
- Filer School District 413
- Hagerman Joint School District 233
- Hansen School District 415
- Kimberly School District 414
- Murtaugh Joint School District 418
- Three Creek Joint Elementary School District 416
- Twin Falls School District 411

The county is in the catchment area, and the taxation zone, for College of Southern Idaho.

== See also ==
- National Register of Historic Places listings in Twin Falls County, Idaho
