= Murtaugh, Idaho =

- City
- Location of Murtaugh in Twin Falls County, Idaho.
- Coordinates: 42°29′31″N 114°09′46″W
- Country: United States
- State: Idaho
- County: Twin Falls

Area
  - Total: 0.12 sq mi (0.31 km^{2})
  - Land: 0.12 sq mi (0.31 km^{2})
  - Water: 0 sq mi (0.00 km^{2})
- Elevation: 4,088 ft (1,246 m)

Population (2020)
  - Total: 114
  - Estimate (2024): 123
  - Density: 1,447.0/sq mi (558.69/km^{2})
- Time zone: UTC-7 (Mountain (MST))
  - Summer (DST): UTC-6 (MDT)
- ZIP code: 83344
- Area codes: 208, 986
- FIPS code: 16-55900
- GNIS feature ID: 2411200
- Website: sites.google.com/view/cityofmurtaugh/home/

Murtaugh is a city in Twin Falls County, Idaho, United States. As of the 2020 census, Murtaugh had a population of 114. It is part of the Twin Falls, Idaho Micropolitan Statistical Area.

== History ==
Murtaugh has existed since at least the early 1950s, and is named after Mark Murtaugh, who oversaw a local irrigation project.

== Geography ==
According to the United States Census Bureau, the town has a total area of 0.12 square miles (0.31 km^{2}), all of it land.

The community is located at a bend in U.S. Route 30. Murtaugh Lake is south of town on the opposite side of US-30.

== Demographics ==
Historical population
Census	Pop.	Note	%±
1940	272		—
1950	239		−12.1%
1960	214		−10.5%
1970	124		−42.1%
1980	114		−8.1%
1990	134		17.5%
2000	139		3.7%
2010	115		−17.3%
2020	114		−0.9%
2024 (est.)	123		7.9%
U.S. Decennial Census

=== 2010 census ===
As of the census of 2010, there were 115 people, 43 households, and 30 families residing in the town. The population density was 958.3 inhabitants per square mile (370.0/km^{2}). There were 49 housing units at an average density of 408.3 per square mile (157.6/km^{2}). The racial makeup was 84.3% White, 14.8% from other races, and 0.9% from two or more races. Hispanic or Latino of any race were 20.0% of the population.

There were 43 households, of which 32.6% had children under the age of 18 living with them, 51.2% were married couples living together, 11.6% had a female householder with no husband present, 7.0% had a male householder with no wife present, and 30.2% were non-families. 27.9% of all households were made up of individuals, and 13.9% had someone living alone who was 65 years of age or older. The average household size was 2.67 and the average family size was 3.20.

The median age was 40.8 years. 24.3% of residents were under the age of 18; 7.8% were between the ages of 18 and 24; 22.6% were from 25 to 44; 30.4% were from 45 to 64; and 14.8% were 65 years of age or older. The gender makeup was 53.9% male and 46.1% female.

=== 2000 census ===
As of the census of 2000, there were 139 people, 49 households, and 36 families residing in the town. The population density was 939.5 inhabitants per square mile (362.7/km^{2}). There were 51 housing units at an average density of 344.7 per square mile (133.1/km^{2}). The racial makeup was 91.37% White, 0.72% Native American, 5.76% from other races, and 2.16% from two or more races. Hispanic or Latino of any race were 6.47% of the population.

There were 49 households, out of which 36.7% had children under the age of 18 living with them, 67.3% were married couples living together, 6.1% had a female householder with no husband present, and 26.5% were non-families. 24.5% of all households were made up of individuals, and 12.2% had someone living alone who was 65 years of age or older. The average household size was 2.84 and the average family size was 3.39.

The population was spread out, with 32.4% under the age of 18, 4.3% from 18 to 24, 28.1% from 25 to 44, 17.3% from 45 to 64, and 18.0% who were 65 years of age or older. The median age was 38 years. For every 100 females, there were 117.2 males. For every 100 females age 18 and over, there were 104.3 males.

The median household income was $23,929, and the median family income was $25,313. Males had a median income of $21,875 versus $16,250 for females. The per capita income was $9,934. There were 12.8% of families and 15.8% of the population living below the poverty line, including 25.6% of under eighteens and none of those over 64.

== See also ==
- National Register of Historic Places listings in Twin Falls County, Idaho
