= Milner Dam =

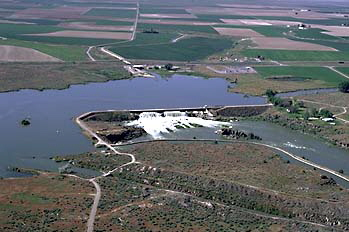
- Interactive map of Milner Dam
- Location: Jerome / Twin Falls counties, Idaho, USA
- Coordinates: 42°31′28″N 114°0′35″W
- Opening date: 1905
- Operators: Milner Dam, Inc.

Dam and spillways
- Impounds: Snake River
- Height: 73 feet (22 m)
- Length: 2,160 feet (658 m)
- Spillway capacity: 116,750 cu ft/s (3,306 m^{3}/s)

Reservoir
- Creates: Milner Lake
- Total capacity: 36,300 acre-feet (44,800,000 m^{3})
- Catchment area: 17,180 sq mi (44,496 km^{2})
- Surface area: 4,000 acres (16 km^{2})
- Milner Dam and the Twin Falls Main Canal
- U.S. National Register of Historic Places
- Area: 340 acres (140 ha)
- Built: 1902
- Architect: Wiley, A.J.
- Architectural style: Rock and earth fill dam
- NRHP reference No.: 86001720
- Added to NRHP: July 10, 1986

Milner Dam is a rockfill dam near Burley in south central Idaho. It impounds the Snake River in a reservoir named Milner Lake. The dam spans the river across two islands, with three embankments.

Milner Dam was authorized for construction as a privately capitalized venture under the 1894 Carey Act, a precursor to the 1902 Reclamation Act. Ira Burton Perrine, a local rancher, chose the site and recruited financial backers, including Salt Lake City banker Stanley B. Milner and eastern investors Frank H. Buhl and Peter L. Kimberly. The Buhl-Kimberly Corporation built the dam and the Twin Falls Canal in 1903–1905. Milner Dam's primary purpose is irrigation but it also produces hydroelectricity. It is currently owned and operated by Milner Dam, Inc. The Snake River below Milner Dam is often allowed to run dry during periods of low flow as water is diverted to agricultural uses.

The dam is 73 feet (22 m) high and 2,160 feet (660 m) long. The storage capacity of its reservoir, Milner Lake, is 36,300 acre-feet (44,800,000 m^{3}). The lake covers 4,000 acres (16 km^{2}).

Inspections in 1988 indicated a high risk of dam failure in an earthquake. In order to pay for the $11 million cost of rebuilding the dam, the operating companies contracted with Idaho Power to build a 57.5 megawatt hydroelectric powerplant 1.5 miles (2.4 km) downstream from the dam, with Idaho Power in return loaning funds for the dam's reconstruction. The 1992 powerplant has 46 and 11.5 MW generators, with a small 800 KW generator for low-flow conditions. Water for the powerplant is drawn from the Twin Falls Canal during seasons when water is not needed for irrigation.

Milner Dam was placed on the National Register of Historic Places on July 10, 1986.

== See also ==
- Gooding Milner canal
- List of dams in the Columbia River watershed
