= Eden, Idaho =

- City
- Location of Eden in Jerome County, Idaho.
- Coordinates: 42°36′19″N 114°12′33″W
- Country: United States
- State: Idaho
- County: Jerome

Area
  - Total: 0.31 sq mi (0.81 km^{2})
  - Land: 0.31 sq mi (0.81 km^{2})
  - Water: 0 sq mi (0.00 km^{2})
- Elevation: 3,960 ft (1,210 m)

Population (2020)
  - Total: 393
  - Density: 1,369.0/sq mi (528.57/km^{2})
- Time zone: UTC-7 (Mountain (MST))
  - Summer (DST): UTC-6 (MDT)
- ZIP code: 83325
- Area code: 208
- FIPS code: 16-24310
- GNIS feature ID: 2410397

Eden is a city in Jerome County, Idaho, United States. As of the 2020 census, Eden had a population of 393. It is part of the Twin Falls, Idaho Metropolitan Statistical Area.

== Geography ==
According to the United States Census Bureau, the city has a total area of 0.32 square miles (0.83 km^{2}), all of it land.

=== Climate ===
According to the Köppen Climate Classification system, Eden has a semi-arid climate, abbreviated "BSk" on climate maps.

== Demographics ==
Historical population
Census	Pop.	Note	%±
1920	359		—
1930	409		13.9%
1940	413		1.0%
1950	456		10.4%
1960	426		−6.6%
1970	343		−19.5%
1980	355		3.5%
1990	314		−11.5%
2000	411		30.9%
2010	405		−1.5%
2020	393		−3.0%
2019 (est.)	427		5.4%
U.S. Decennial Census

=== 2010 census ===
As of the census of 2010, there were 405 people, 160 households, and 105 families residing in the city. The population density was 1,265.6 inhabitants per square mile (488.7/km^{2}). There were 180 housing units at an average density of 562.5 per square mile (217.2/km^{2}). The racial makeup of the city was 75.8% White, 21.7% from other races, and 2.5% from two or more races. Hispanic or Latino of any race were 26.7% of the population.

There were 160 households, of which 35.6% had children under the age of 18 living with them, 48.1% were married couples living together, 11.9% had a female householder with no husband present, 5.6% had a male householder with no wife present, and 34.4% were non-families. 28.8% of all households were made up of individuals, and 16.3% had someone living alone who was 65 years of age or older. The average household size was 2.53 and the average family size was 3.07.

The median age in the city was 36.1 years. 28.4% of residents were under the age of 18; 7.8% were between the ages of 18 and 24; 25.8% were from 25 to 44; 22.5% were from 45 to 64; and 15.6% were 65 years of age or older. The gender makeup of the city was 52.1% male and 47.9% female.

=== 2000 census ===
As of the census of 2000, there were 411 people, 155 households, and 108 families residing in the city. The population density was 1,279.3 inhabitants per square mile (493.9/km^{2}). There were 165 housing units at an average density of 513.6 per square mile (198.3/km^{2}). The racial makeup of the city was 86.37% White, 0.24% Native American, 12.65% from other races, and 0.73% from two or more races. Hispanic or Latino of any race were 15.33% of the population.

There were 155 households, out of which 34.8% had children under the age of 18 living with them, 54.8% were married couples living together, 10.3% had a female householder with no husband present, and 30.3% were non-families. 25.2% of all households were made up of individuals, and 9.0% had someone living alone who was 65 years of age or older. The average household size was 2.65 and the average family size was 3.17.

In the city, the population was spread out, with 29.9% under the age of 18, 10.5% from 18 to 24, 23.1% from 25 to 44, 21.4% from 45 to 64, and 15.1% who were 65 years of age or older. The median age was 34 years. For every 100 females, there were 107.6 males. For every 100 females age 18 and over, there were 105.7 males.

The median income for a household in the city was $21,339, and the median income for a family was $28,333. Males had a median income of $19,773 versus $16,500 for females. The per capita income for the city was $16,948. About 11.0% of families and 18.2% of the population were below the poverty line, including 21.4% of those under age 18 and 10.6% of those age 65 or over.

== Education ==
Children in Eden attend the schools of Valley School District.
