= Filer, Idaho =

- City
- Location of Filer in Twin Falls County, Idaho.
- Coordinates: 42°34′07″N 114°37′12″W
- Country: United States
- State: Idaho
- County: Twin Falls
- Founded: 1906

Area
  - Total: 1.02 sq mi (2.65 km^{2})
  - Land: 1.02 sq mi (2.65 km^{2})
  - Water: 0 sq mi (0.00 km^{2})
- Elevation: 3,780 ft (1,150 m)

Population (2020)
  - Total: 2,738
  - Density: 2,869.5/sq mi (1,107.92/km^{2})
- Time zone: UTC-7 (Mountain (MST))
  - Summer (DST): UTC-6 (MDT)
- ZIP code: 83328
- Area codes: 208, 986
- FIPS code: 16-27730
- GNIS feature ID: 2410503
- Website: www.cityoffiler.net

Filer (FĪ-ler) is a city in Twin Falls County, Idaho, United States. As of the 2020 census, Filer had a population of 2,738. Filer is located just west of the intersection of U.S. Routes 93 and 30.

== History ==
The city of Filer was named after Walter G. Filer, who served as general manager of the Twin Falls Water and Land Company. The city was established in 1906 as the terminus of the Oregon Short Line branch of Twin Falls. Walter Filer was a mining engineer and surveyor from Sharon, Pennsylvania, who supervised the construction of the Milner diversion dam on the Snake River. Since 1916, the City of Filer has been the home of the Twin Falls County Fair and Rodeo (Magic Valley Stampede).

== Geography ==
According to the United States Census Bureau, the city has a total area of 1.06 square miles (2.75 km^{2}), all of it land.

== Demographics ==
Historical population
Census	Pop.	Note	%±
1910	214		—
1920	1,012		372.9%
1930	1,011		−0.1%
1940	1,239		22.6%
1950	1,425		15.0%
1960	1,249		−12.4%
1970	1,173		−6.1%
1980	1,645		40.2%
1990	1,511		−8.1%
2000	1,620		7.2%
2010	2,508		54.8%
2020	2,738		9.2%
2019 (est.)	2,931		16.9%
U.S. Decennial Census

=== 2020 census ===
As of the 2020 census, Filer had a population of 2,738. The median age was 32.8 years. 31.9% of residents were under the age of 18 and 14.0% of residents were 65 years of age or older. For every 100 females, there were 92.0 males, and for every 100 females age 18 and over, there were 92.1 males.

0.0% of residents lived in urban areas, while 100.0% lived in rural areas.

There were 1,003 households in Filer, of which 40.7% had children under the age of 18 living in them. Of all households, 49.0% were married-couple households, 16.7% were households with a male householder and no spouse or partner present, and 27.5% were households with a female householder and no spouse or partner present. About 26.5% of all households were made up of individuals, and 12.9% had someone living alone who was 65 years of age or older.

There were 1,067 housing units, of which 6.0% were vacant. The homeowner vacancy rate was 0.0% and the rental vacancy rate was 6.6%.

Racial composition as of the 2020 census
Race	Number	Percent
White	2,419	88.3%
Black or African American	6	0.2%
American Indian and Alaska Native	33	1.2%
Asian	8	0.3%
Native Hawaiian and Other Pacific Islander	1	0.0%
Some other race	77	2.8%
Two or more races	194	7.1%
Hispanic or Latino (of any race)	309	11.3%

=== 2010 census ===
As of the census of 2010, there were 2,508 people, 951 households, and 653 families residing in the city. The population density was 2,366.0 inhabitants per square mile (913.5/km^{2}). There were 1,002 housing units at an average density of 945.3 per square mile (365.0/km^{2}). The racial makeup of the city was 91.6% White, 0.1% African American, 1.0% Native American, 0.1% Asian, 4.3% from other races, and 2.9% from two or more races. Hispanic or Latino of any race were 11.7% of the population.

There were 951 households, of which 38.9% had children under the age of 18 living with them, 51.6% were married couples living together, 12.7% had a female householder with no husband present, 4.3% had a male householder with no wife present, and 31.3% were non-families. 27.7% of all households were made up of individuals, and 10.8% had someone living alone who was 65 years of age or older. The average household size was 2.64 and the average family size was 3.23.

The median age in the city was 32.5 years. 31.6% of residents were under the age of 18; 6% were between the ages of 18 and 24; 27.1% were from 25 to 44; 23% were from 45 to 64; and 12.3% were 65 years of age or older. The gender makeup of the city was 48.9% male and 51.1% female.

=== 2000 census ===
As of the census of 2000, there were 1,620 people, 628 households, and 420 families residing in the city. The population density was 2,028.7 inhabitants per square mile (783.3/km^{2}). There were 676 housing units at an average density of 846.5 per square mile (326.8/km^{2}). The racial makeup of the city was 95.31% White, 0.31% African American, 1.36% Native American, 0.12% Asian, 0.12% Pacific Islander, 1.30% from other races, and 1.48% from two or more races. Hispanic or Latino of any race were 5.74% of the population.

There were 628 households, out of which 34.9% had children under the age of 18 living with them, 54.0% were married couples living together, 9.6% had a female householder with no husband present, and 33.0% were non-families. 28.2% of all households were made up of individuals, and 14.2% had someone living alone who was 65 years of age or older. The average household size was 2.58 and the average family size was 3.19.

In the city, the population was spread out, with 29.0% under the age of 18, 9.3% from 18 to 24, 27.2% from 25 to 44, 19.4% from 45 to 64, and 15.0% who were 65 years of age or older. The median age was 35 years. For every 100 females, there were 97.6 males. For every 100 females age 18 and over, there were 95.6 males.

The median income for a household in the city was $31,336, and the median income for a family was $36,346. Males had a median income of $27,083 versus $20,563 for females. The per capita income for the city was $14,443. About 10.4% of families and 13.7% of the population were below the poverty line, including 17.8% of those under age 18 and 13.8% of those age 65 or over.

== County fair ==
The Twin Falls County Fair is located in Filer, occurring in the first week of September. It is the city's biggest attraction.

== Notable person ==
- Clark Kauffman, farmer and politician.

== See also ==
- List of cities in Idaho
