= National Register of Historic Places listings in Lincoln County, Idaho =

Location of Lincoln County in Idaho

This is a list of the National Register of Historic Places listings in Lincoln County, Idaho.

This is intended to be a complete list of the properties and districts on the National Register of Historic Places in Lincoln County, Idaho, United States. Latitude and longitude coordinates are provided for many National Register properties and districts; these locations may be seen together in a map.

There are 41 properties and districts listed on the National Register in the county. More may be added; properties and districts nationwide are added to the Register weekly.

This National Park Service list is complete through NPS recent listings posted December 12, 2025.

== Current listings ==
| | Name on the Register | Image | Date listed | Location | City or town | Description |
|---|---|---|---|---|---|---|
| 1 | American Legion Hall | American Legion Hall | September 8, 1983 (#83002355) | 107 W. A St. 42°56′04″N 114°24′25″W | Shoshone | |
| 2 | Jose and Gertrude Anasola House | Jose and Gertrude Anasola House | September 8, 1983 (#83002356) | 120 N. Alta St. 42°56′13″N 114°24′11″W | Shoshone | |
| 3 | Galo Arambarri Boarding House | Galo Arambarri Boarding House | September 8, 1983 (#83002357) | 109 N. Greenwood St. 42°56′15″N 114°24′17″W | Shoshone | |
| 4 | S.A. Bate Barn and Chicken House | S.A. Bate Barn and Chicken House | September 8, 1983 (#83002358) | Southeast of Dietrich; 42°53′05″N 114°15′14″W | Dietrich | |
| 5 | W. H. Baugh House | | September 8, 1983 (#83002359) | East of Shoshone; 42°57′38″N 114°18′36″W | Shoshone | |
| 6 | Ignacio Berriochoa Farm | | September 8, 1983 (#83002360) | Northwest of Dietrich; 42°55′10″N 114°18′03″W | Dietrich | |
| 7 | Birdie Boussuet Farm | | September 8, 1983 (#83002361) | West of Richfield; 43°01′54″N 114°11′24″W | Richfield | |
| 8 | Tom Byrne House | | September 8, 1983 (#83002362) | Northeast of Shoshone; 43°07′45″N 114°15′54″W | Shoshone | |
| 9 | Custer Slaughter House | Custer Slaughter House | September 8, 1983 (#83002363) | West of Shoshone; 42°56′42″N 114°25′29″W | Shoshone | |
| 10 | Darrah House and Water Tank House | | September 8, 1983 (#83002365) | Northeast of Shoshone; 42°58′55″N 114°21′32″W | Shoshone | |
| 11 | Ben Darrah Water Tank and Well House | Ben Darrah Water Tank and Well House | September 8, 1983 (#83002364) | North of Shoshone; 43°01′34″N 114°24′58″W | Shoshone | |
| 12 | Charles W. Dill House | Charles W. Dill House | September 8, 1983 (#83002366) | East of Shoshone; 42°55′08″N 114°21′45″W | Shoshone | |
| 13 | Alvin Eskelton Barn | | September 8, 1983 (#83002367) | Northwest of Richfield; 43°05′34″N 114°10′25″W | Richfield | |
| 14 | George H. Gaches Cellar and Ice House | | September 8, 1983 (#83002368) | Northwest of Shoshone; 43°01′07″N 114°26′43″W | Shoshone | |
| 15 | Thomas Gooding Water Tank House | | September 8, 1983 (#83002369) | Northwest of Shoshone; 43°01′32″N 114°30′55″W | Shoshone | |
| 16 | Gehrig Gottfried Cabin | | September 8, 1983 (#83002370) | Northwest of Shoshone; 43°02′45″N 114°19′33″W | Shoshone | |
| 17 | Daniel A. Hunt House | Daniel A. Hunt House | September 8, 1983 (#83002371) | Southwest of Dietrich; 42°52′06″N 114°17′41″W | Dietrich | |
| 18 | J.C. Penney Company Building | J.C. Penney Company Building | September 8, 1983 (#83002372) | 104 S. Rail St. 42°56′06″N 114°24′21″W | Shoshone | |
| 19 | Louis Johnson Barn | | September 8, 1983 (#83002373) | Southwest of Richfield; 43°01′36″N 114°13′45″W | Richfield | |
| 20 | Louis Johnson Water Tank House | | September 8, 1983 (#83002374) | West of Richfield; 43°01′30″N 114°14′37″W | Richfield | |
| 21 | Quet Johnson Farm | Quet Johnson Farm | September 8, 1983 (#83002375) | Northwest of Richfield; 43°05′55″N 114°10′10″W | Richfield | |
| 22 | W.S. Kohl Barn | | September 8, 1983 (#83002376) | Northeast of Richfield; 43°04′25″N 114°07′54″W | Richfield | |
| 23 | James H. Lane Barn | James H. Lane Barn | September 8, 1983 (#83002377) | South of Richfield; 43°02′33″N 114°09′07″W | Richfield | |
| 24 | Lemmon Hardware Store | Lemmon Hardware Store | September 8, 1983 (#83002378) | Main St. and Nez Perce Ave. 43°02′58″N 114°09′08″W | Richfield | |
| 25 | W.H. Murphy House | W.H. Murphy House | September 8, 1983 (#83002379) | 607 S. Greenwood St. 42°55′53″N 114°24′30″W | Shoshone | |
| 26 | Myers School | | September 8, 1983 (#83002380) | West of Shoshone; 42°57′28″N 114°29′20″W | Shoshone | |
| 27 | A.G. Newman House | A.G. Newman House | September 8, 1983 (#83002381) | 309 E. C St. 42°55′55″N 114°24′16″W | Shoshone | |
| 28 | Thomas Olley House | Thomas Olley House | September 8, 1983 (#83002382) | 522 N. Apple St. 42°56′28″N 114°24′20″W | Shoshone | |
| 29 | Jack Oughton House | Jack Oughton House | September 8, 1983 (#83002383) | 123 N. Beverly St. 42°56′13″N 114°24′08″W | Shoshone | |
| 30 | Denton J. Paul Water Tank | Denton J. Paul Water Tank | September 8, 1983 (#83002384) | East of Dietrich; 42°54′31″N 114°14′28″W | Dietrich | |
| 31 | Kenneth G. Phelphs Barn | | September 8, 1983 (#83002385) | West of Richfield; 43°02′58″N 114°10′25″W | Richfield | |
| 32 | Purdum Livery Stable | | September 15, 1983 (#83002393) | 113 N. Rail St., E. 42°56′09″N 114°24′16″W | Shoshone | |
| 33 | Richfield Pump House | | September 8, 1983 (#83002386) | Southeast of Richfield; 43°02′30″N 114°09′01″W | Richfield | |
| 34 | William M. Ritter House | | September 8, 1983 (#83002387) | Northeast of Shoshone; 43°01′10″N 114°21′13″W | Shoshone | |
| 35 | Shoshone Historic District | Shoshone Historic District | June 27, 1975 (#75000636) | Irregular pattern, including the northern bank of the Little Wood River and W. D St.; also 115 N. Greenwood St. 42°56′02″N 114°24′28″W | Shoshone | Greenwood St. address represents a boundary increase |
| 36 | Arthur D. Silva Flume | | September 8, 1983 (#83002388) | Northwest of Shoshone; 42°59′26″N 114°26′59″W | Shoshone | |
| 37 | Arthur D. Silva Ranch | Arthur D. Silva Ranch | September 8, 1983 (#83002389) | Northwest of Shoshone; 42°59′37″N 114°27′14″W | Shoshone | |
| 38 | Arthur D. Silva Water Tank | | September 8, 1983 (#83002390) | Northwest of Shoshone; 42°59′43″N 114°27′14″W | Shoshone | |
| 39 | Manuel Silva Barn | Manuel Silva Barn | September 8, 1983 (#83002391) | East of Shoshone; 42°55′34″N 114°21′35″W | Shoshone | |
| 40 | John G. Turner House | | September 8, 1983 (#83002392) | West of Richfield; 43°00′20″N 114°14′23″W | Richfield | |
| 41 | Wood River Center Grange No. 87 | Wood River Center Grange No. 87 | July 3, 2003 (#03000586) | 375 W. 4 Mile Rd. 43°00′12″N 114°28′43″W | Shoshone | |

== See also ==
- List of National Historic Landmarks in Idaho
- National Register of Historic Places listings in Idaho
