= Jack Oughton =

Irish-born American stonemason (1876-c1940)

John "Jack" Oughton (September 18, 1876 – after 1940) was a skilled stonemason in Lincoln County, Idaho. A number of his works are listed on the U.S. National Register of Historic Places.

Oughton was born in Ireland and immigrated to the United States in 1886. At the time of the 1910 United States census, he was living in Twin Falls, Idaho with Mary Oughton, age 16, and was employed as a mason. At the time of the 1920 United States census he was living in Shoshone, Idaho with fellow stonemason and partner Alexander Reed. At the time of the 1940 Census, he was still living in Shoshone and employed as a mason.

== Works ==
- American Legion Hall, built in 1928, at 107 W. A St., Shoshone, Idaho (Oughton, Jack), NRHP-listed
- W. S. Kohl Barn, built in 1910, located northeast of Richfield Richfield, Idaho (Oughton, Jack), NRHP-listed
- James H. Laine Barn, built in 1910, located south of Richfield, Idaho, (Oughton, Jack), NRHP-listed
- W. H. Murphy House, built in 1928, at 607 S. Greenwood St., Shoshone, Idaho (Oughton, Jack), NRHP-listed
- Jack Oughton House, built in 1931, at 123 N. Beverly St., Shoshone, Idaho (Oughton, Jack), NRHP-listed

== See also ==
- Ignacio Berriochoa, a contemporary stonemason, also in Lincoln County
- Bill Darrah, a contemporary stonemason, also in Lincoln County
- H. T. Pugh, a contemporary stonemason in Jerome County
