= Ignacio Berriochoa =

American stonemason

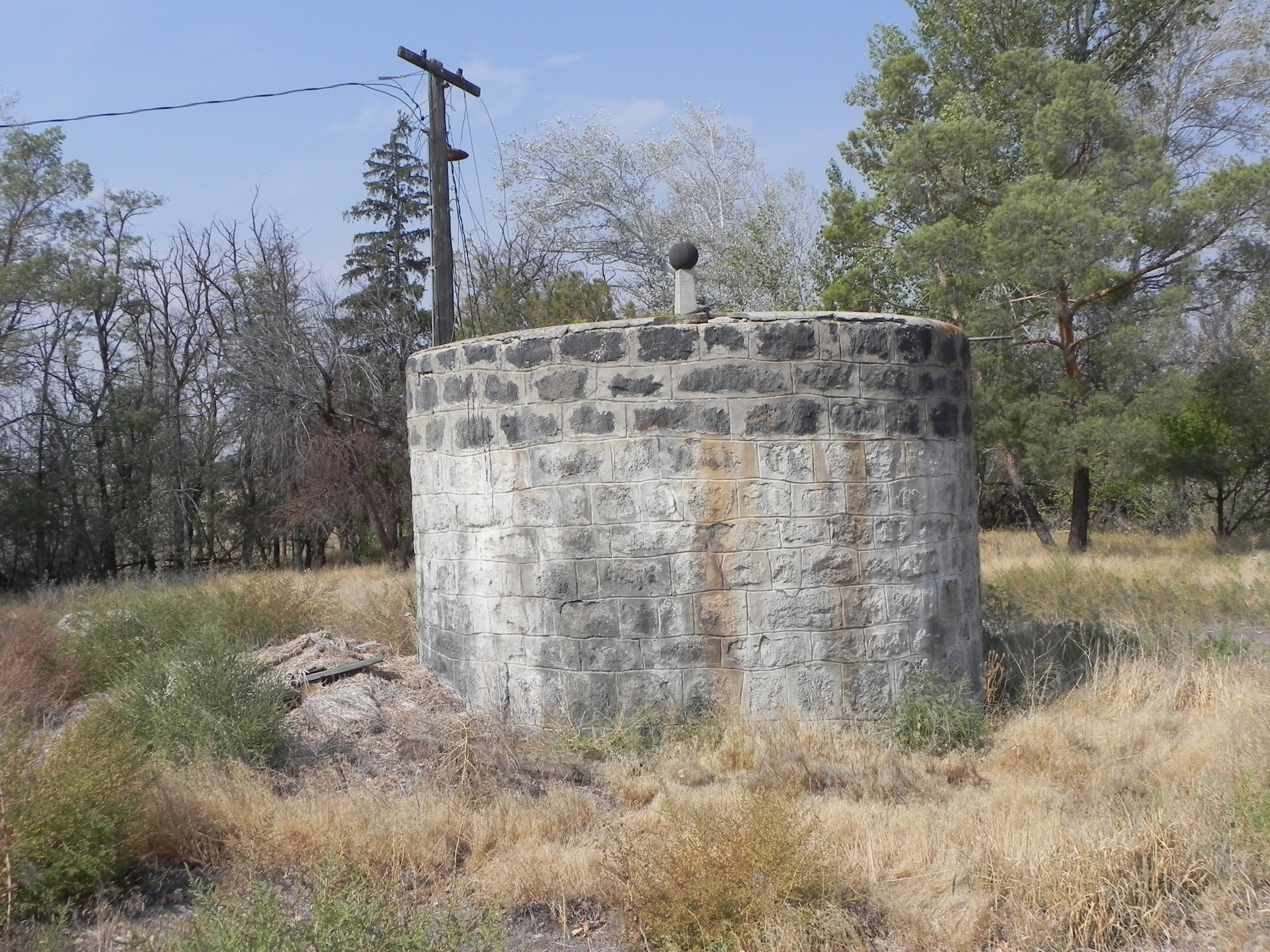
Denton J. Paul Water Tank

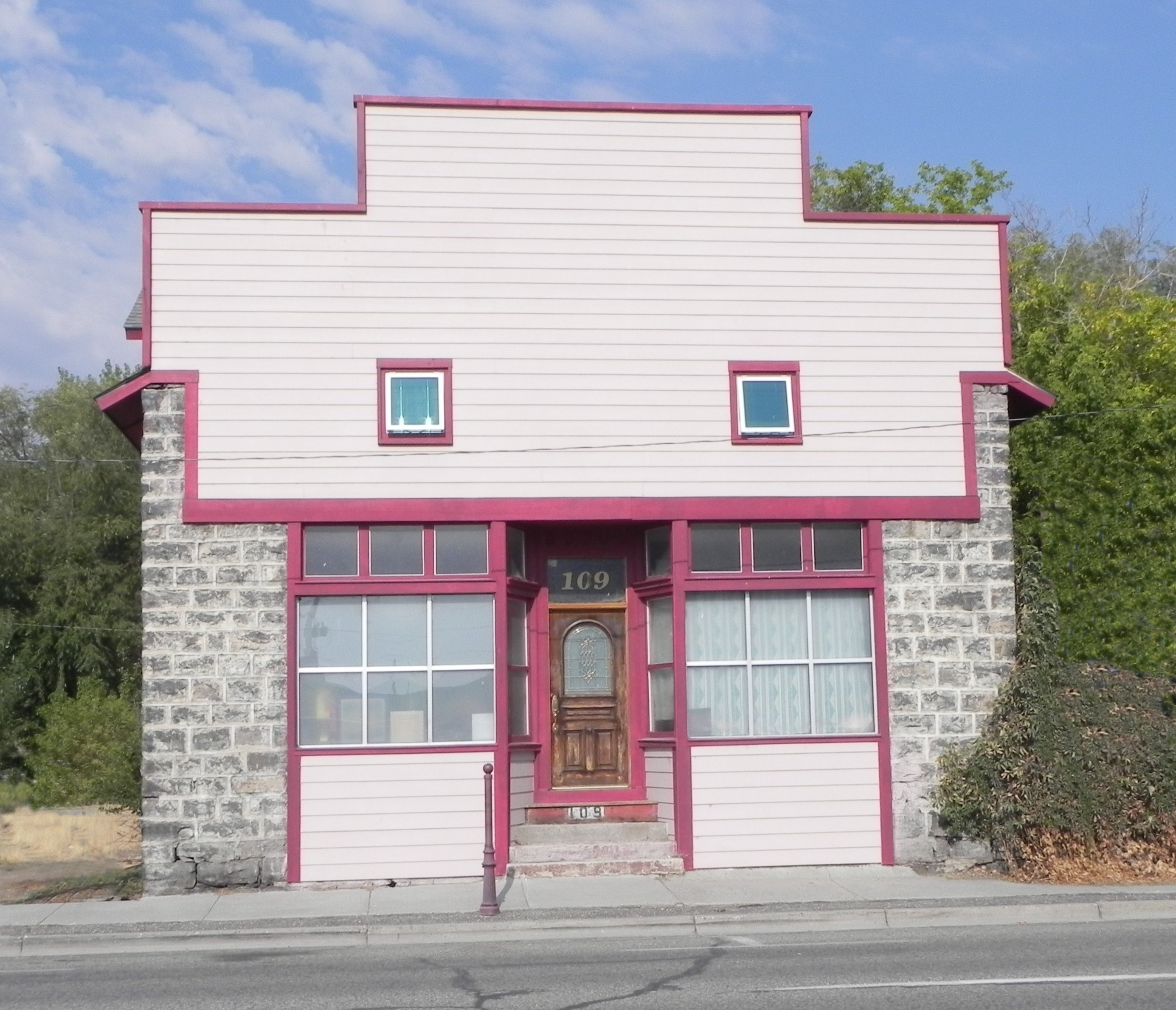
Galo Arambarri Boarding House

Ignacio Ygnatil Berriochoa (July 31, 1865 - May 17, 1949) was a skilled stonemason in Lincoln County, Idaho. He was born in Elorrio (Basque Country, Spain) and moved to Idaho in 1904. He lived in Shoshone, Idaho from 1910 to 1949 where he was a farmer and sheepman. A number of his works are listed on the U.S. National Register of Historic Places.

Works include:

- Jose and Gertrude Anasola House, 120 N. Alta St. Shoshone, ID (Berriochoa, Ignacio), NRHP-listed
- Galo Arambarri Boarding House, 109 N. Greenwood St. Shoshone, ID (Berriochoa, Ignacio), NRHP-listed
- Ignacio Berriochoa Farm, NW of Dietrich Dietrich, ID (Berriochoa, Ignacio), NRHP-listed
- J.C. Penney Company Building, 104 S. Rail St. Shoshone, ID (Berriochoa, Ignacio), NRHP-listed
- Denton J. Paul Water Tank, E of Dietrich Dietrich, ID (Berriochoa, Ignacio), NRHP-listed
- Manuel Silva Barn, E of Shoshone Shoshone, ID (Berriochoa, Ignacio), NRHP-listed

== See also ==
- Jack Oughton, a contemporary stonemason, also in Lincoln County
- Bill Darrah, also in Lincoln County
- H. T. Pugh, a contemporary stonemason in Jerome County
