= Myers School =

Myers School may refer to:

- Myers School (Shoshone, Idaho), listed on the National Register of Historic Places (NRHP)
- Myers School Timbered Lodge (32BI401), near Medora, North Dakota, also NRHP-listed
