= Bill Darrah =

William Lindsey Darrah (April 7, 1876 - after 1920) was a sheep rancher and stonemason in Shoshone, Idaho known for his construction of lava rock water tanks from the 1910s to 1920s. He built water tanks ranging from approximately eight to 30 feet high and from 12 to 25 feet in diameter. His tanks were typically built with a stone foundation several feet into the ground. The walls were approximately three feet wide and built out of lava stones and lime mortar. Darrah's tanks were typically accompanied by one-story pump houses.

A number of Darrah's works are listed on the National Register of Historic Places, some as part of a Multiple Resource Area Thematic Group submission for Lava Rock Structures in South Central Idaho.

Darrah was born in April 1876 in California. He was the son of Simon Darrah and Arzilla (Shipton) Darrah. At the time of the 1880 United States census, he was living in Shasta, California with his parents and six siblings. His father was employed as a lumberman at the time. By 1900, Darrah had relocated to Shoshone, Idaho where he was living with his parents and four siblings. As of 1918, Darrah was living in Shoshone with his wife, Ida A. Darrah and listed his occupation as a self-employed contractor. At the time of the 1920 United States census, he remained in Shoshone living with his wife Ida and his sister-in-law Effie Parry. His occupation was listed as a mason, and his wife as a stenographer in an abstract office.

Darrah's works include:

- Darrah House and Water Tank House, located northeast of Shoshone, Idaho, NRHP-listed
- Ben Darrah Water Tank and Well House, located north of Shoshone, Idaho, NRHP-listed
- Thomas Gooding Water Tank House, located northwest of Shoshone, Idaho, NRHP-listed
- Louis Johnson Water Tank House, located west of Richfield, Idaho, NRHP-listed
- Myers School, located west of Shoshone, Idaho, NRHP-listed
- J. W. and Rachel Newman House and Bunkhouse, located east of Jerome, Idaho, NRHP-listed
- Arthur D. Silva Water Tank, located northwest of Shoshone, Idaho, NRHP-listed

== See also ==
- Jack Oughton, a contemporary stonemason, also in Lincoln County
- Ignacio Berriochoa, a contemporary stonemason, also in Lincoln County
- H. T. Pugh, a contemporary stonemason in Jerome County
