= Custer Slaughter House =

Historic house in Idaho, United States

- U.S. National Register of Historic Places
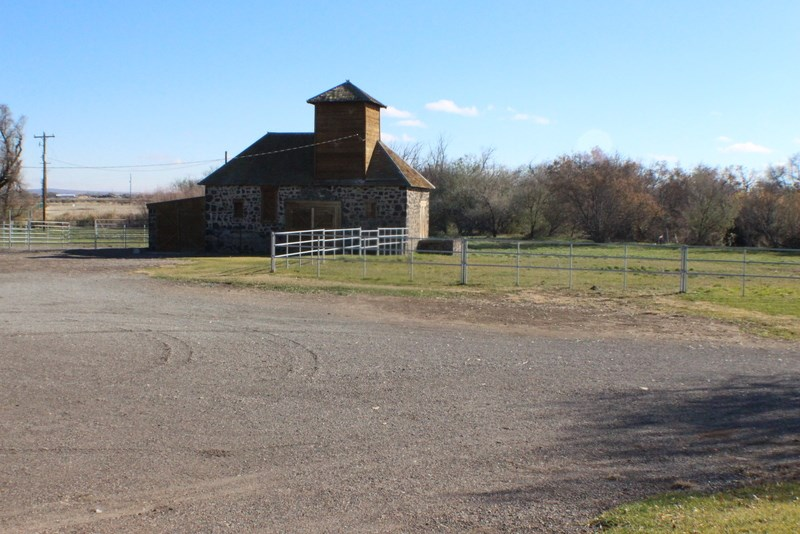

- Location within Idaho Location within the United States
- Location: West of Shoshone, Idaho
- Coordinates: 42°56′41″N 114°24′41″W
- Area: 2.5 acres (1.0 ha)
- Built: c.1890
- MPS: Lava Rock Structures in South Central Idaho TR
- NRHP reference No.: 83002363
- Added to NRHP: September 8, 1983

The Custer Slaughter House, located west of Shoshone in Lincoln County, Idaho, was built in the late 1890s. It was built near railroad tracks and the Little Wood River. It was listed on the National Register of Historic Places in 1983.

== Description ==
The house is a lava rock structure. It is about 18 by 26 feet (5.5 m × 7.9 m) in plan and has a hipped roof and a tall square wooden tower.

It was deemed to be architecturally significant "as it is an early example of a commercial building built with lava rock."

== See also ==
- National Register of Historic Places listings in Lincoln County, Idaho
