= Wood River Center Grange No. 87 =

- U.S. National Register of Historic Places
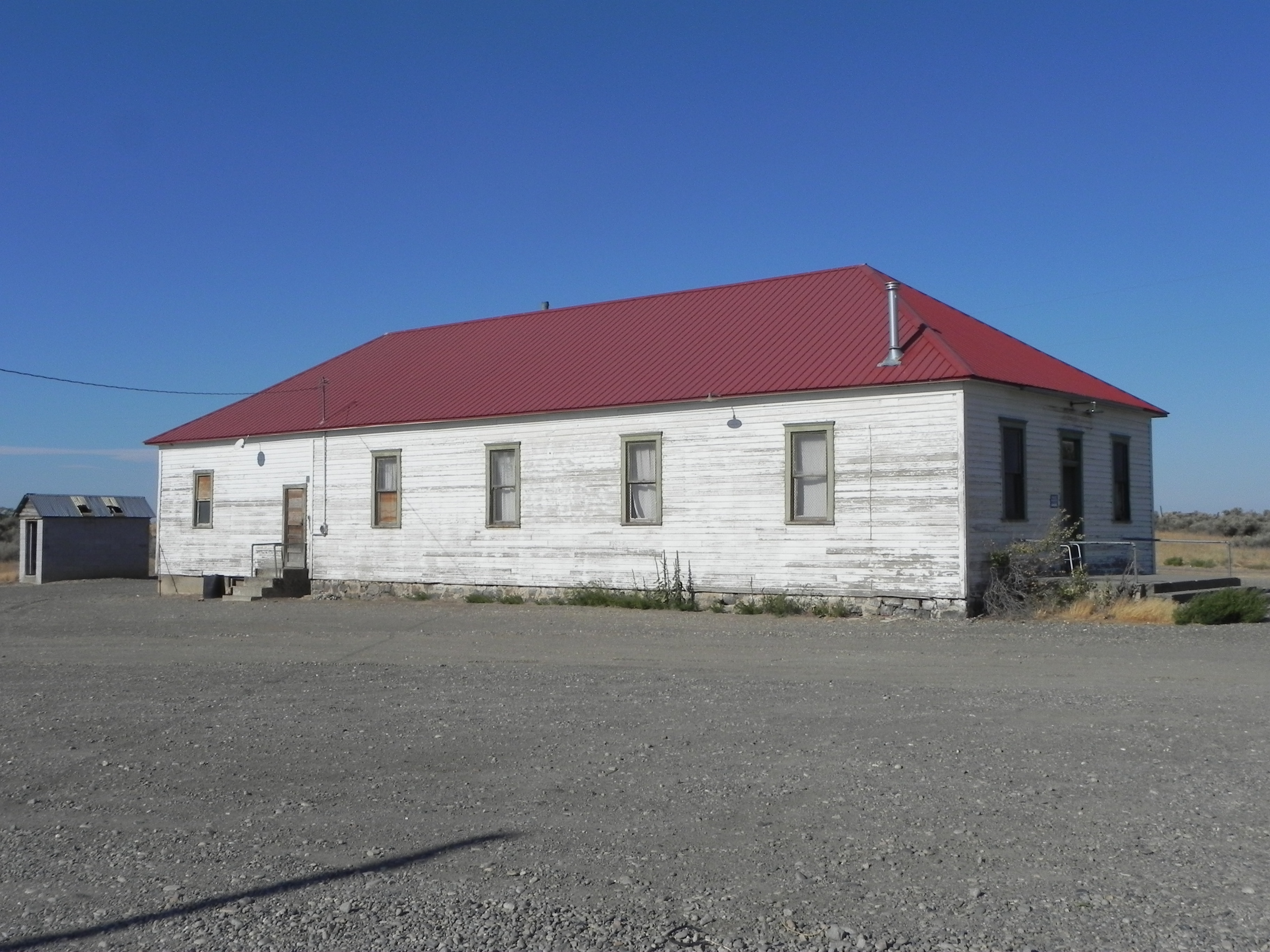

- Location within Idaho Location within the United States
- Nearest city: Shoshone, Idaho
- Coordinates: 43°0′12″N 114°28′43″W
- Area: 1 acre (0.40 ha)
- Built: 1914
- NRHP reference No.: 03000586
- Added to NRHP: July 3, 2003

Wood River Center Grange No. 87, also known as Wood River Grange, in or near Shoshone, Idaho, was built in 1914. It was the center of social activity in its area of rural Lincoln County, Idaho.

It was listed on the National Register of Historic Places in 2003.
