= W. H. Murphy House =

Historic house in Idaho, United States

- U.S. National Register of Historic Places
- Location within Idaho Location within the United States
- Nearest city: Shoshone, Idaho
- Coordinates: 42°55′53″N 114°24′30″W
- Area: less than one acre
- Built: 1928
- Built by: Oughton, Jack; Reed, Sandy
- Architectural style: Mixed (more than 2 styles from different periods)
- MPS: Lava Rock Structures in South Central Idaho TR
- NRHP reference No.: 83002379
- Added to NRHP: September 8, 1983

The W. H. Murphy House near Shoshone, Idaho, United States, was built in 1928 by stonemason Jack Oughton and by Sandy Reed. It was listed on the National Register of Historic Places in 1983.
