= Alvin Eskelton Barn =

- U.S. National Register of Historic Places
- Location within Idaho Location within the United States
- Nearest city: Richfield, Idaho
- Coordinates: 43°05′34″N 114°10′25″W
- Area: less than 1 acre (0.40 ha)
- Built: c. 1918
- MPS: Lava Rock Structures in South Central Idaho TR (64000165)
- NRHP reference No.: 83002367
- Added to NRHP: 8 September 1983

The Alvin Eskelton Barn, located northwest of Richfield, Idaho in Lincoln County, Idaho, was built c. 1918. It was listed on the National Register of Historic Places on September 8, 1983.

It is a 58 by 60 feet (18 m × 18 m) structure, with eight-foot high lava rock (basalt) walls.

It was listed on the National Register as one barn in a group of lava rock structures studied together.

It has a rounded roof and a hay hood at one end, and is locally called "the round barn".

It is located about one mile west, and 3.5 miles (5.6 km) north of Richfield.

The barn may have been destroyed: satellite imagery in 2019 shows outline of a destroyed structure at approximately the coordinates given for this barn, at a property on the east side of Chatterly Road in Lincoln County.
