= W. H. Baugh House =

- U.S. National Register of Historic Places
- Location within Idaho Location within the United States
- Nearest city: Shoshone, Idaho
- Coordinates: 42°57′38″N 114°18′36″W
- Area: 2.5 acres (1.0 ha)
- Built: 1910
- MPS: Lava Rock Structures in South Central Idaho TR (64000165)
- NRHP reference No.: 83002359
- Added to NRHP: 8 September 1983

The W. H. Baugh House, in Lincoln County, Idaho near Shoshone, Idaho, was built in 1910 and was listed on the National Register of Historic Places in 1983.

It is a lava rock stone house built by "a competent stone mason", but the house's "boxed wooden lintels suggest that he was unfamiliar with the use of concrete. It was the country house of Shoshone dentist Dr. W. H. Baugh. It is located near the Little Wood River about 5.5 miles (8.9 km) east of Shoshone .
