= Tom Byrne House =

- U.S. National Register of Historic Places
- Location within Idaho Location within the United States
- Nearest city: Shoshone, Idaho
- Coordinates: 43°07′45″N 114°15′54″W
- Area: 2.5 acres (1.0 ha)
- Built: 1914
- Built by: Hayden brothers
- Architectural style: Colonial Revival
- MPS: Lava Rock Structures in South Central Idaho TR (64000165)
- NRHP reference No.: 83002362
- Added to NRHP: 8 September 1983

The Tom Byrne House, in Lincoln County, Idaho near Shoshone, Idaho was built in 1914 and was listed on the National Register of Historic Places in 1983.

It is a one-story lava rock house built by the Hayden brothers, and has some elements of Colonial Revival style. It is about 25 by 31 feet (7.6 m × 9.4 m) in plan.

It is located northeast of Shoshone.
