= Rachel Newman =

Rachel or Rachael Newman may refer to:

- J. W. and Rachel Newman House and Bunkhouse
- Rachael Newman, protagonist in American Psycho 2
- Rachel Newman, character in Mission Compromised
- Rachel Newman (editor), editor emeritus of Country Living
