= Ben Darrah Water Tank and Well House =

- U.S. National Register of Historic Places
- Location within Idaho Location within the United States
- Nearest city: Shoshone, Idaho
- Coordinates: 43°1′34″N 114°24′58″W
- Area: 1.3 acres (0.53 ha)
- Built: 1916
- Built by: Bill Darrah
- MPS: Lava Rock Structures in South Central Idaho TR
- NRHP reference No.: 83002364
- Added to NRHP: September 8, 1983

The Ben Darrah Water Tank and Well House near Shoshone, Idaho, United States, were built in c. 1916 by stonemason Bill Darrah. They were listed on the National Register of Historic Places in 1983; the listing included two contributing buildings on 1.3 acres (0.53 ha).

The water tank is round, constructed of rock walls about 12 feet (3.7 m) tall and 14 feet (4.3 m) in diameter. It is covered by a concrete-coated wood plank cover. It is one of Bill Darrah's earlier water tank works, and was built for his brother Ben Darrah's upper ranch.

As of 1981 an Aermotor windmill tower and mechanism, non-functioning, rose from a well house in front of the water tank. Its survival is unusual among Darrah's works.

The water tank and well house were deemed significant "both for their association with the development of sheep ranching in Lincoln County and for their lava rock craftsmanship."

Bill Darrah also built a water tank for the Arthur D. Silva ranch a few miles closer to Shoshone, in the late 1910s.
