= Arambarri =

Arámbarri is a surname. Notable people with the surname include:

- Aritz Arambarri (born 1998), Spanish footballer
- Jesús Arámbarri (1902–1960), Spanish classical music conductor and composer native to the Basque Country
- Mauro Arambarri (born 1995), Uruguayan footballer

== See also ==
- Galo Arambarri Boarding House
