= James H. Laine Barn =

- Laine, James H., Barn
- U.S. National Register of Historic Places
- Location within Idaho Location within the United States
- Nearest city: Richfield, Idaho
- Coordinates: 43°2′33″N 114°9′7″W
- Area: 2.5 acres (1.0 ha)
- Built: 1910
- Built by: Oughton, Jack; Reed, Sandy
- MPS: Lava Rock Structures in South Central Idaho TR
- NRHP reference No.: 83002377
- Added to NRHP: September 8, 1983

The James H. Laine Barn near Richfield, Idaho, United States, was built in 1910 by stonemason Jack Oughton and by Sandy Reed. It was listed on the National Register of Historic Places in 1983. The listing included a 2.5-acre (1.0 ha) area.
