= W. S. Kohl Barn =

- W.S. Kohl Barn
- U.S. National Register of Historic Places
- Location within Idaho Location within the United States
- Nearest city: Richfield, Idaho
- Coordinates: 43°4′25″N 114°7′54″W
- Area: less than one acre
- Built: c. 1917
- Built by: Oughton, Jack; Reed, Sandy
- MPS: Lava Rock Structures in South Central Idaho TR
- NRHP reference No.: 83002376
- Added to NRHP: September 8, 1983

The W.S. Kohl Barn near Richfield, Idaho, United States, is a lava rock barn built in c. 1917, probably by skilled stonemason Jack Oughton and by Sandy Reed. Its design appears to be that of a plan advertised by the Gem State Lumber Company of Richfield, and its approximate date of construction is determined by record of farmer W.S. Kohl taking out a mortgage for it in 1917.

It is approximately 40 feet (12 m) by 50 feet (15 m) with a high gambrel roof. It is located about a mile northwest of Richfield.

It was listed on the National Register of Historic Places in 1983.

It was listed in a group with many other lava rock structures in Jerome and Lincoln counties.
