= Manuel Silva Barn =

- U.S. National Register of Historic Places
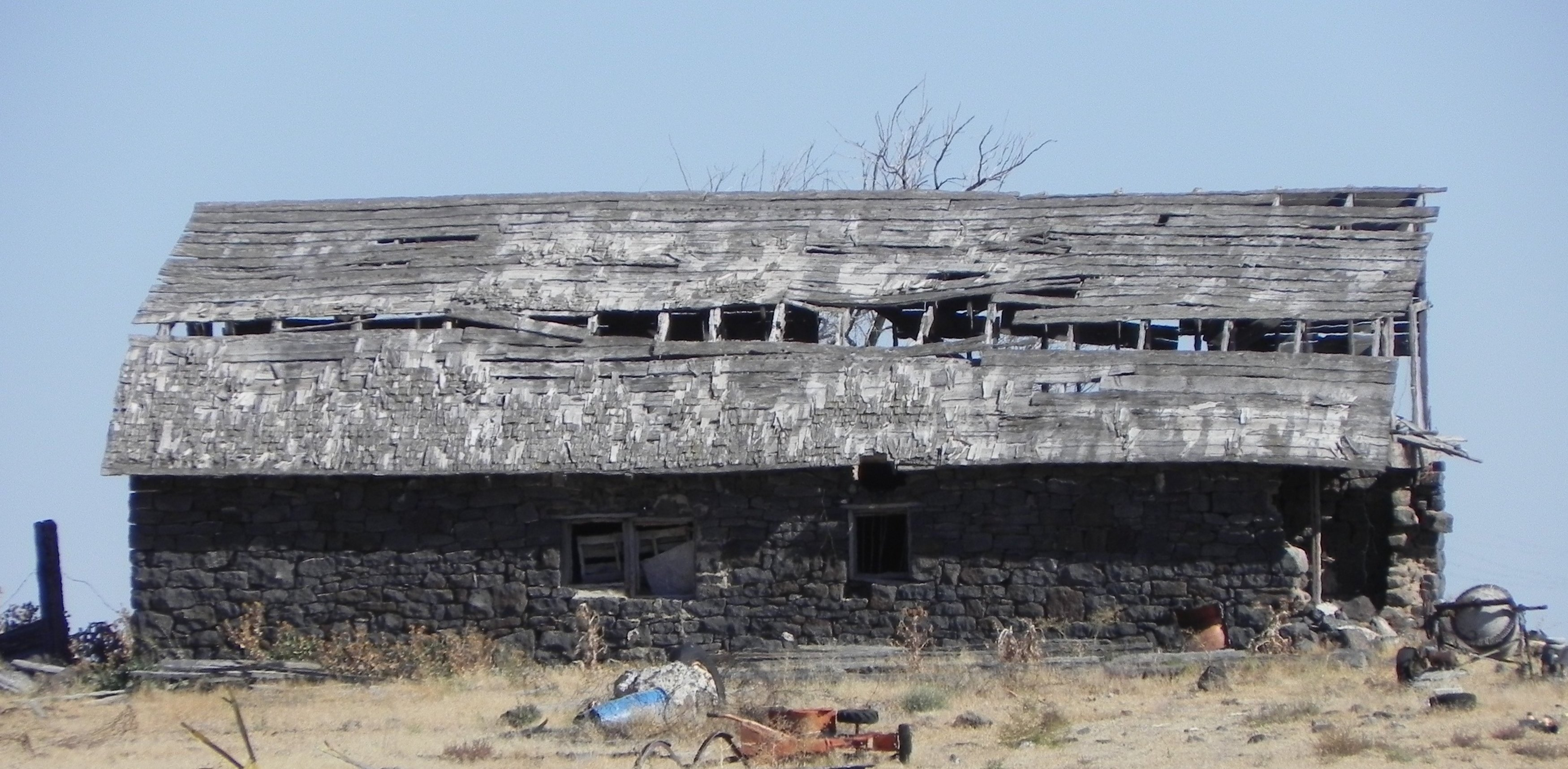

- Location within Idaho Location within the United States
- Nearest city: Shoshone, Idaho
- Coordinates: 42°55′34″N 114°21′35″W
- Area: 2.5 acres (1.0 ha)
- Built: 1910
- Built by: Berriochoa, Ignacio
- MPS: Lava Rock Structures in South Central Idaho TR
- NRHP reference No.: 83002391
- Added to NRHP: September 8, 1983

The Manuel Silva Barn near Shoshone, Idaho, United States, was built in 1910 by stonemason Ignacio Berriochoa, who lived about 2 miles (3.2 km) away. It was listed on the National Register of Historic Places (NRHP) in 1983.

It is a 16 feet (4.9 m) by 30 feet (9.1 m) structure with a half gambrel roof that has the appearance of a half of a barn; it no doubt was intended to be expanded to be a full size.

== See also ==
- Arthur D. Silva Water Tank, a work of another local stonemason, NRHP-listed
