= Darrah House and Water Tank House =

- U.S. National Register of Historic Places
- Location within Idaho Location within the United States
- Nearest city: Shoshone, Idaho
- Coordinates: 42°58′55″N 114°21′32″W
- Area: 5 acres (2.0 ha)
- Built: 1913
- Built by: Bill Darrah
- MPS: Lava Rock Structures in South Central Idaho TR
- NRHP reference No.: 83002365
- Added to NRHP: September 8, 1983

The Darrah House and Water Tank House, near Shoshone, Idaho, were built in 1913 by sheep rancher and stonemason Bill Darrah. They were listed on the National Register of Historic Places in 1983. The listing included two contributing buildings on 5 acres (2.0 ha).

The house is a one-and-a-half-story stone house with a truncated pyramidal roof. It is about 29 by 29 feet (8.8 m × 8.8 m) in plan.

The water tank house is about 15 feet (4.6 m) in diameter and about 20 feet (6.1 m) tall. It is located about 100 feet (30 m) east of the house.
