= Jose and Gertrude Anasola House =

Historic house in Idaho, United States

- U.S. National Register of Historic Places
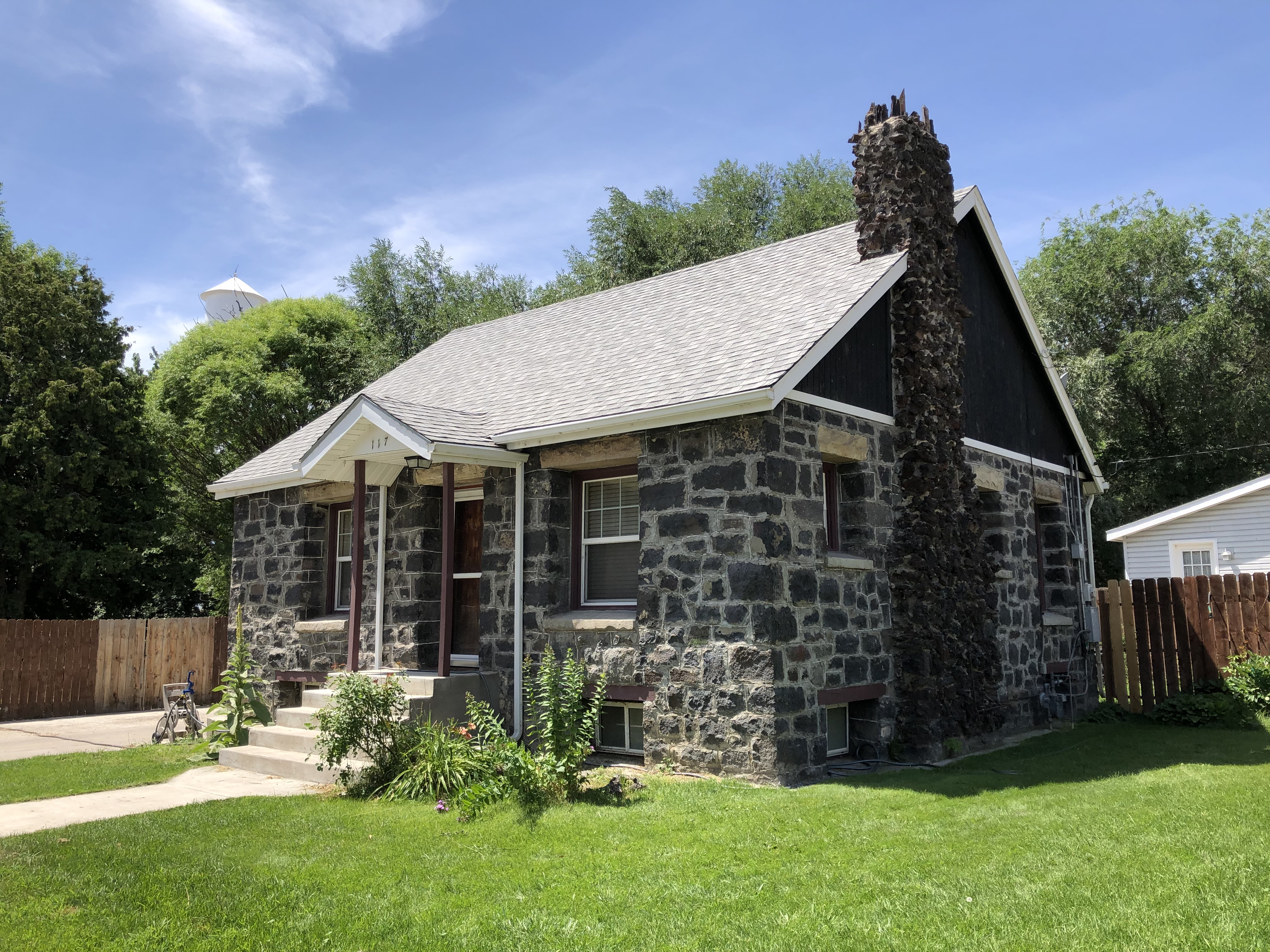
- The Anasola House in 2019

- Location within Idaho Location within the United States
- Nearest city: Shoshone, Idaho
- Coordinates: 42°56′13″N 114°24′11″W
- Built: c. 1913
- Mason: Ignacio Berriochoa
- MPS: Lava Rock Structures in South Central Idaho TR (64000165)
- NRHP reference No.: 83002356
- Added to NRHP: 8 September 1983

The Jose and Gertrude Anasola House near Shoshone, Idaho, United States, was built in c. 1913 by stonemason Ignacio Berriochoa. It is a stone house with a shallow pyramid roof. Its front wall is built of dressed stone and a light plastering does not conceal the stonework. It was listed on the National Register of Historic Places on September 8, 1983, as a part of the Lava Rock Structures in South Central Idaho Thematic Resource.

It was home of a Basque family, Jose and Gertrude Anasola, who operated a Basque boardinghouse nearby. It is a 26 feet (7.9 m) by 30 feet (9.1 m) lava rock structure that is "boxy" in appearance, which is speculated to perhaps be in imitation of the boxy Colonial Revival style frame houses being built in the area by non-Basque wealthy sheepmen.
