= J. C. Penney Company Building (Shoshone, Idaho) =

- J.C. Penney Company Building
- U.S. National Register of Historic Places
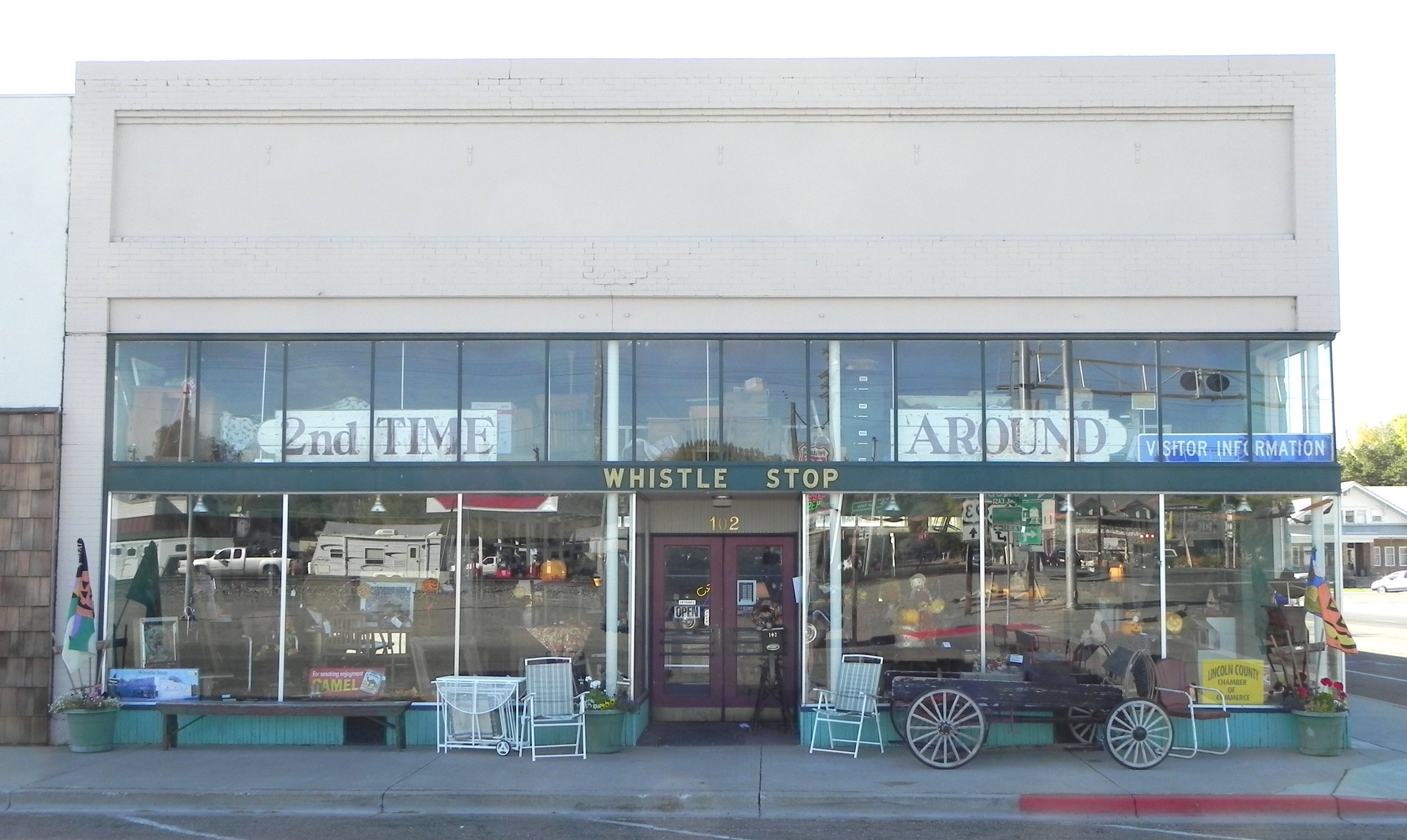
- JC Penney Co. Building in 2013

- Location within Idaho Location within the United States
- Location: 104 S. Rail St., Shoshone, Idaho
- Coordinates: 42°56′6″N 114°24′21″W
- Built: 1918
- Mason: Ignacio Berriochoa
- MPS: Lava Rock Structures in South Central Idaho TR (64000165)
- NRHP reference No.: 83002372
- Added to NRHP: 8 September 1983

The J. C. Penney Company Building located at 104 S. Rail Street in Shoshone, Idaho, is a historic department store building. It was built in 1918 by stonemason Ignacio Berriochoa.

The building was identified in a Thematic Resource study, "Lava Rock Structures in South Central Idaho thematic group", and it was listed on the National Register of Historic Places on September 8, 1983.

== See also ==
- J. C. Penney
