= Thomas Gooding Water Tank House =

- U.S. National Register of Historic Places
- Location within Idaho Location within the United States
- Nearest city: Shoshone, Idaho
- Coordinates: 43°1′32″N 114°30′55″W
- Area: less than one acre
- Built: 1919
- Built by: Darrah, Bill
- MPS: Lava Rock Structures in South Central Idaho TR
- NRHP reference No.: 83002369
- Added to NRHP: September 8, 1983

The Thomas Gooding Water Tank House near Shoshone, Idaho, United States, is an elevated water tank structure that was built of stone in 1919 by sheep rancher and stonemason Bill Darrah. It was built for Thomas Gooding. The elevated water tank is supported on five I-beams. It is a 20-foot (6.1 m) tall 12-foot (3.7 m) diameter structure. Originally a windmill was atop the structure to lift the water, but is no longer present.

It was listed on the National Register of Historic Places in 1983.
