= Ignacio Berriochoa Farm =

- U.S. National Register of Historic Places
- Location within Idaho Location within the United States
- Nearest city: Dietrich, Idaho
- Coordinates: 42°55′10″N 114°18′3″W
- Area: 1.3 acres (0.53 ha)
- Built: 1920
- Built by: Berriochoa, Ignacio
- MPS: Lava Rock Structures in South Central Idaho TR
- NRHP reference No.: 83002360
- Added to NRHP: September 8, 1983

The Ignacio Berriochoa Farm near Dietrich, Idaho, has two lava rock structures built in c.1920 by Basque stonemason Ignacio Berriochoa. It was listed on the National Register of Historic Places in 1983. The listing included two contributing buildings on 1.3 acres (0.53 ha).

The house is 26 feet (7.9 m) by 36 feet (11 m) and has a hipped roof on rubble walls. The gable-roofed barn, also with rubble walls, is about 30 feet (9.1 m) by 30 feet (9.1 m).
