= Louis Johnson Water Tank House =

- U.S. National Register of Historic Places
- Location within Idaho Location within the United States
- Nearest city: Richfield, Idaho
- Coordinates: 43°1′30″N 114°14′37″W
- Area: less than one acre
- Built: c.1910
- Built by: Darrah, Bill
- MPS: Lava Rock Structures in South Central Idaho TR
- NRHP reference No.: 83002374
- Added to NRHP: September 8, 1983

The Louis Johnson Water Tank House near Richfield, Idaho, United States, is believed to have been built in the 1910s by sheep rancher and stonemason Bill Darrah. It was listed on the National Register of Historic Places in 1983.

It is larger and taller than other water tank houses built by Darrah in the region, and probably provided water for several residences. It is about 27 feet (8.2 m) tall (to the peak of its conical roof) and 18 feet (5.5 m) in diameter.
