= Shoshone School District =

School district in Idaho, United States

Shoshone Joint School District 312 is a school district headquartered in Shoshone, Idaho.

The district includes a portion of Lincoln County. A portion of the district is in Jerome County.

It operates Shoshone Elementary School and Shoshone Junior/Senior High School. It also operates the High Desert School.

== History ==
In 1980, it was holding an election to have voters decide whether the district should pursue $44,755 in override money.

On August 7, 1984, the district held on election on whether there would be $40,000 in levies. The measure needed about 66% of the voters to have it passed. 165 voted for and 94 voted against, which meant it did not make the 66% threshold.

In 2004, there was a plan for a subdivision that could possibly increase total school district enrollment by around 200.
