= Denton J. Paul Water Tank =

- U.S. National Register of Historic Places
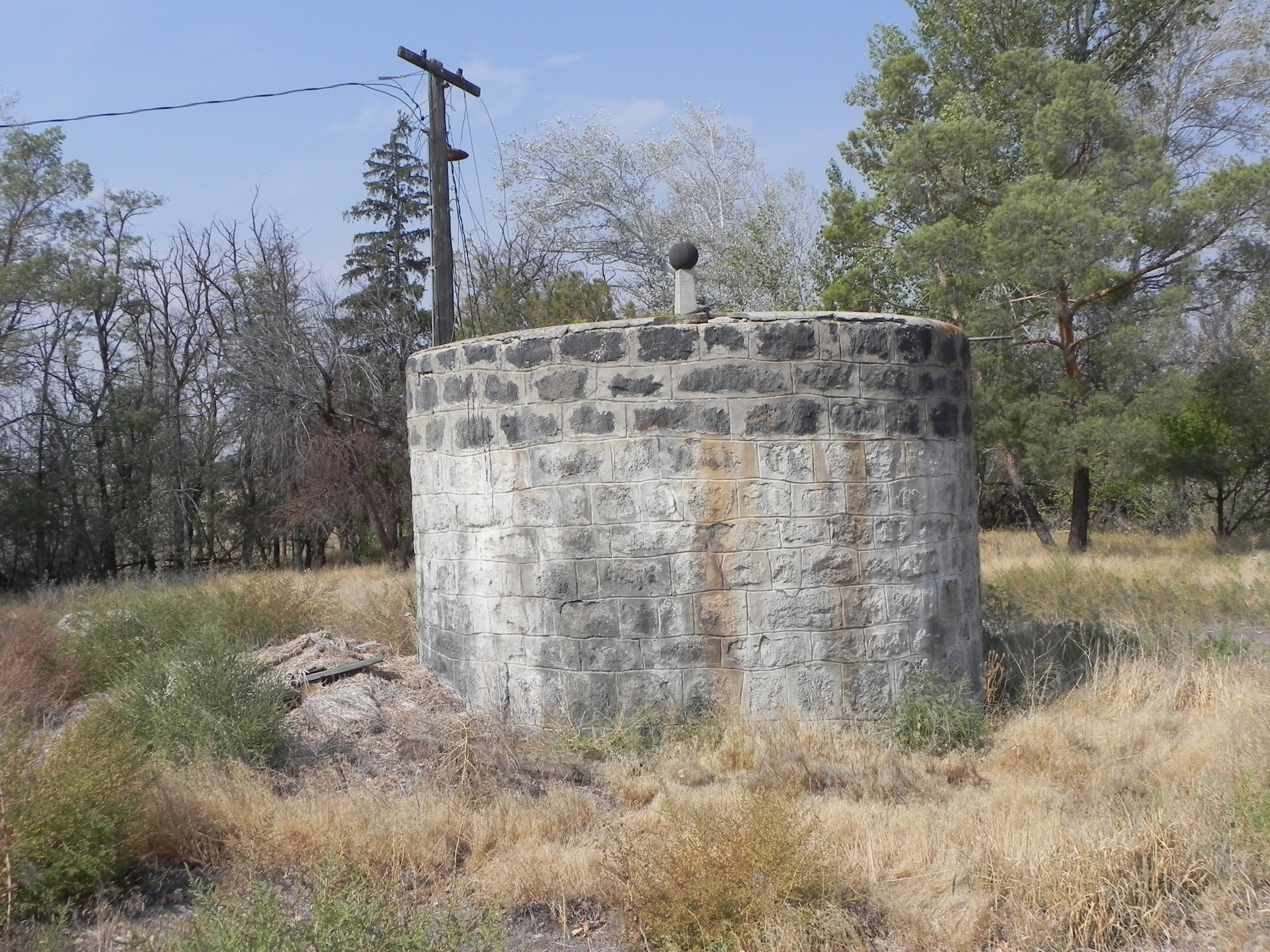

- Location within Idaho Location within the United States
- Nearest city: Dietrich, Idaho
- Coordinates: 42°54′31″N 114°14′28″W
- Area: less than one acre
- Built: c.1918
- Built by: Berriochoa, Ignacio (likely)
- MPS: Lava Rock Structures in South Central Idaho TR
- NRHP reference No.: 83002384
- Added to NRHP: September 8, 1983

The Denton J. Paul Water Tank near Dietrich, Idaho, United States, was built in c.1918, perhaps by stonemason Ignacio Berriochoa and his helper Julian Pagoaga; Berriochoa lived about three miles away. It was listed on the National Register of Historic Places in 1983.

It is located on the farm of Denton J. Paul who owned and occupied it during 1911 to 1928, receiving final patent on it in 1918. It is a round water tank approximately 12 feet (3.7 m) tall and 12 feet (3.7 m) in diameter, with a plank top covered with concrete. It has rubble walls with mortar that is nearly flush, but is pointed to one-inch wide indentations. There is a dark lava block or ball about 8 inches (20 cm) in diameter centered on top of the tank, on a concrete stand.
