= Jack Oughton House =

Historic house in Idaho, United States

- U.S. National Register of Historic Places
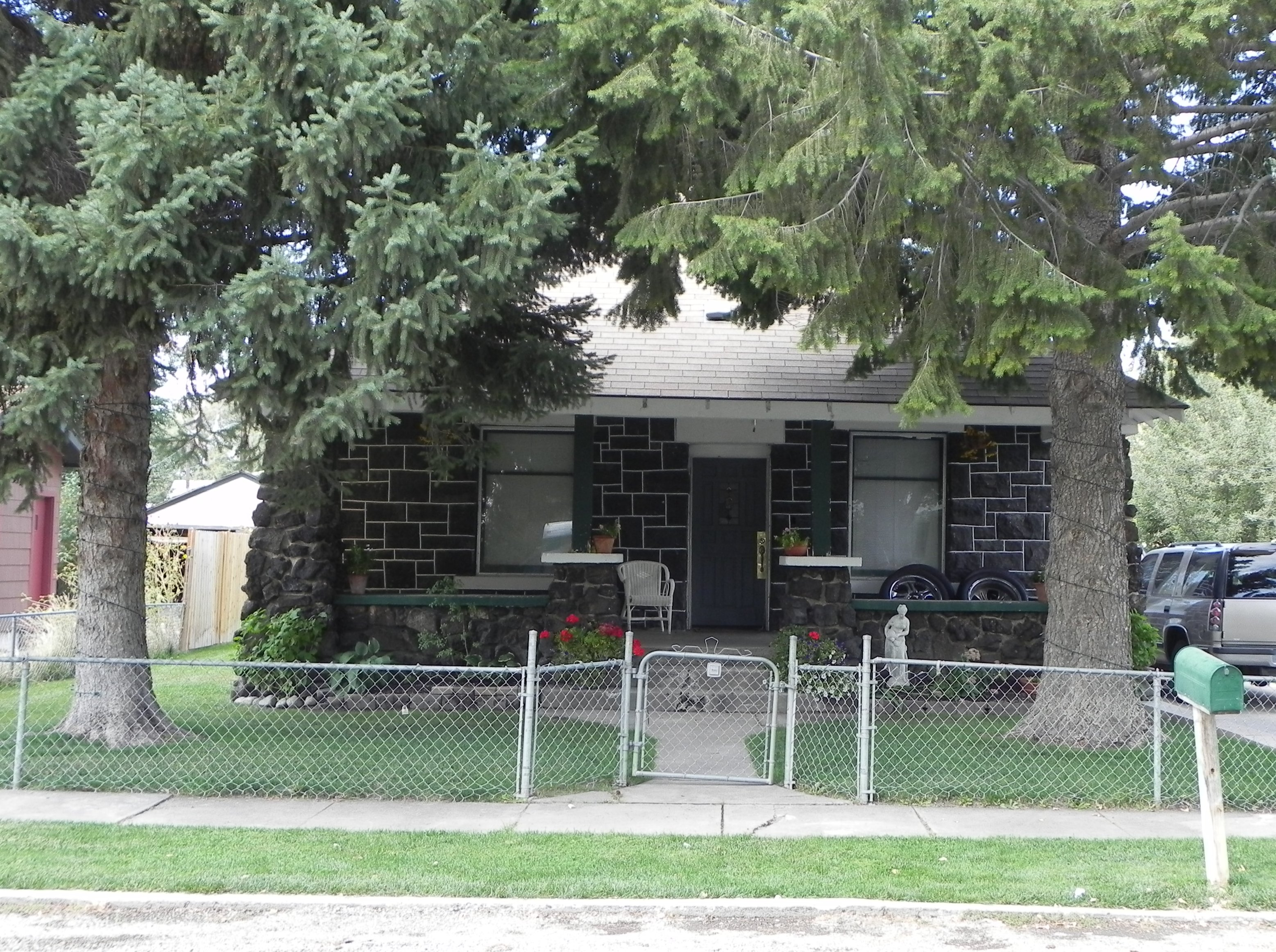

- Location within Idaho Location within the United States
- Nearest city: Shoshone, Idaho
- Coordinates: 42°56′13″N 114°24′8″W
- Area: less than one acre
- Built: 1920s-1931
- Built by: Oughton, Jack; Reed, Sandy
- Architectural style: Mixed (more than 2 styles from different periods)
- MPS: Lava Rock Structures in South Central Idaho TR
- NRHP reference No.: 83002383
- Added to NRHP: September 8, 1983

The Jack Oughton House near Shoshone, Idaho was begun during the 1920s and completed in 1931 by stonemasons Jack Oughton and his partner Sandy Reed. It was listed on the National Register of Historic Places in 1983.

It is a one-story stone house about 28 feet (8.5 m) by 48 feet (15 m) in plan with a hipped roof and exposed rafters. It has windows and a front door with concrete lintels. Its architecture seems to reflect Bungalow architecture as well as other influence.

It was deemed significant as an example of vernacular architecture and for association with Jack Oughton, who worked as a stonemason around Shoshone for more than three decades, and whose home it was.
