= Birdie Boussuet Farm =

- U.S. National Register of Historic Places
- Location within Idaho Location within the United States
- Nearest city: Richfield, Idaho
- Coordinates: 43°01′54″N 114°11′24″W
- Area: 1.3 acres (0.53 ha)
- Built: 1921
- MPS: Lava Rock Structures in South Central Idaho TR
- NRHP reference No.: 83002361
- Added to NRHP: September 8, 1983

The Birdie Boussuet Farm, near Richfield, Idaho, was listed on the National Register of Historic Places in 1983.

It includes a low one-story house built of lava rock, about 30 by 38 feet (9.1 m × 11.6 m) in plan. It also includes a barn. The buildings "are significant as examples of rural vernacular architecture demonstrating the hard work and resourcefulness of a Lincoln county farmer-mason," Birdie Bousset. It was owned by him from about 1921 to 1927.

It is located about 1.75 feet (0.53 m) west of Richfield.
