= Myers School (Shoshone, Idaho) =

- U.S. National Register of Historic Places
- Location within Idaho Location within the United States
- Nearest city: Shoshone, Idaho
- Coordinates: 42°57′28″N 114°29′23″W
- Area: 2.5 acres (1.0 ha)
- Built: c. 1910
- Built by: Bill Darrah
- MPS: Lava Rock Structures in South Central Idaho TR (64000165)
- NRHP reference No.: 83002380
- Added to NRHP: 8 September 1983

The Myers School near Shoshone, Idaho, United States, was a lava rock schoolhouse built in the 1910s probably by sheep rancher and stonemason Bill Darrah. It was listed on the National Register of Historic Places on September 8, 1983, when it was in deteriorated condition.

It is the only lava rock schoolhouse in the two-county area covered in a study of lava rock structures.
