= American Legion Hall (Shoshone, Idaho) =

- U.S. National Register of Historic Places
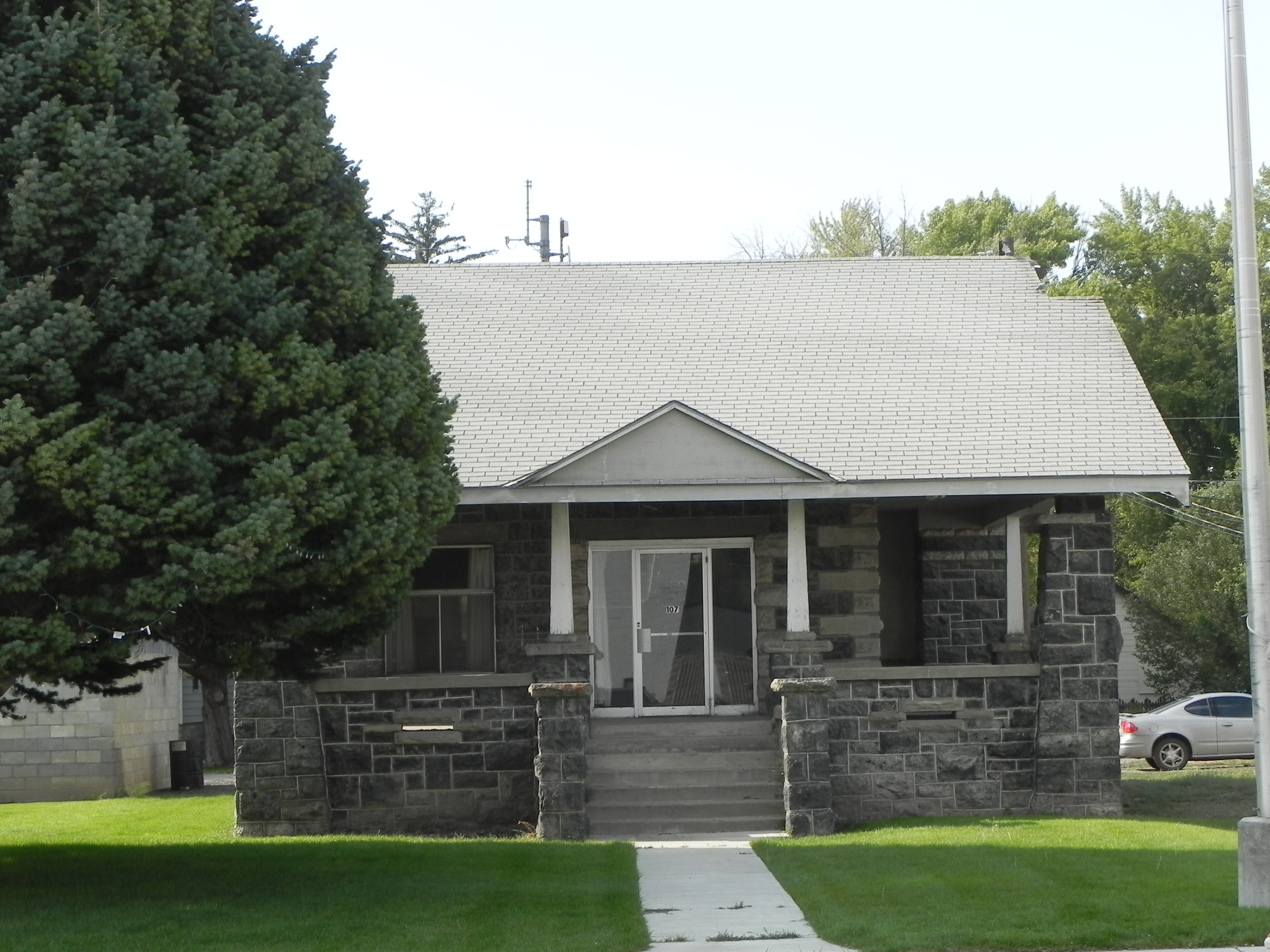

- Location within Idaho Location within the United States
- Interactive map showing the location of American Legion Hall
- Location: 107 W A Street, Shoshone, Idaho 83352
- Nearest city: Shoshone, Idaho
- Coordinates: 42°56′4″N 114°24′25″W
- Area: less than one acre
- Built: 1928
- Built by: Oughton, Jack; Rhodes, Steve
- Architectural style: Bungalow/Craftsman
- MPS: Lava Rock Structures in South Central Idaho TR
- NRHP reference No.: 83002355
- Added to NRHP: September 8, 1983

The American Legion Hall near Shoshone, Idaho is a stone building that was built in 1928 and listed on the NRHP on September 8, 1983. It is of Bungalow/Craftsman architecture and served as a clubhouse and as a meeting hall, and was listed on the NRHP for its architecture. It is located at 107 West A Street in Shoshone. It was built by stonemason Jack Oughton. It was also a work of Steve Rhodes.

It is a tall two-story building that is about 44 feet (13 m) by 36 feet (11 m). It has a porch that is inset at the front and wraps out around one side of the house.
