= Galo Arambarri Boarding House =

- U.S. National Register of Historic Places
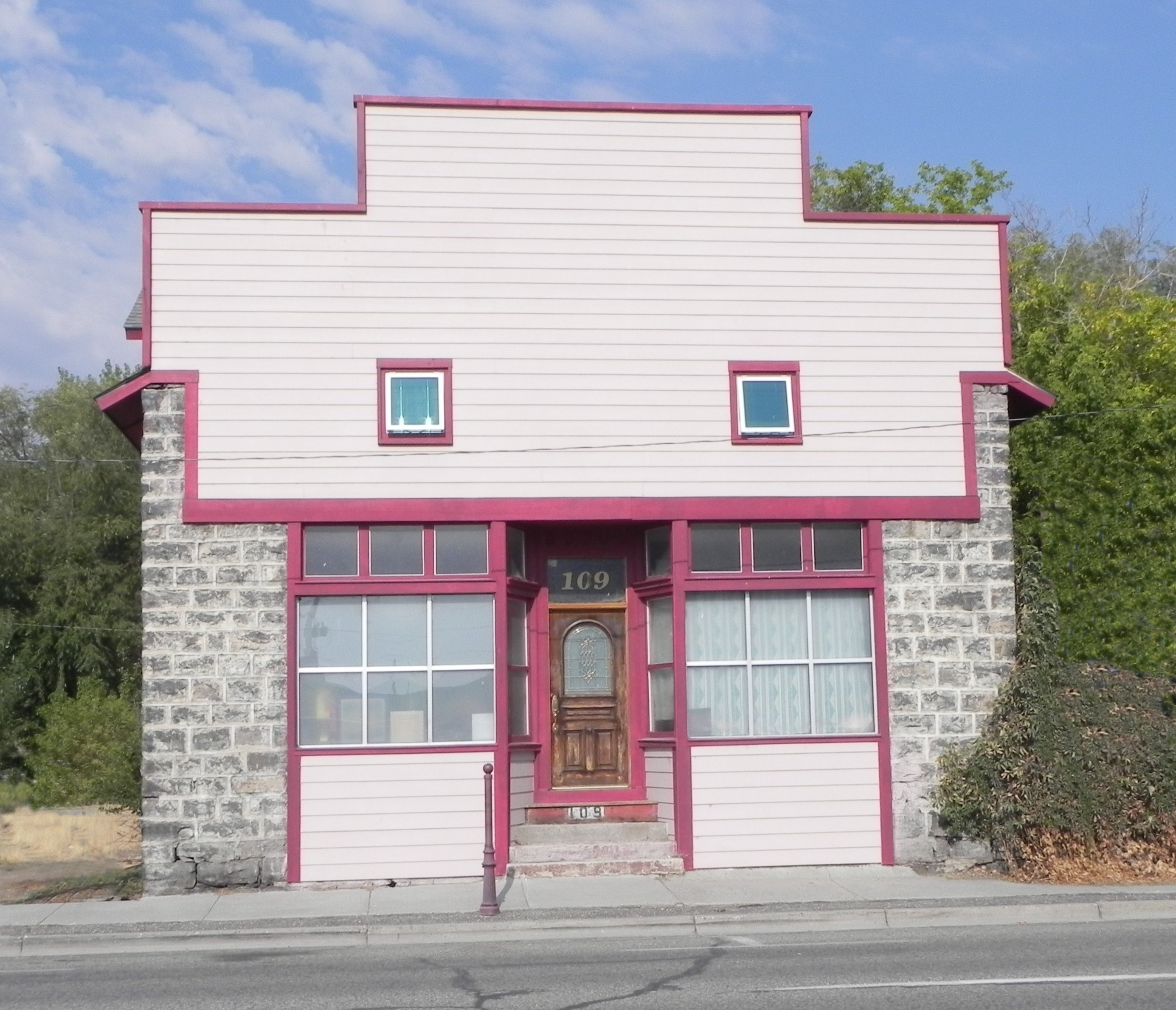

- Location within Idaho Location within the United States
- Nearest city: Shoshone, Idaho
- Coordinates: 42°56′15″N 114°24′17″W
- Area: less than one acre
- Built: 1913-14
- Built by: Berriochoa, Ignacio
- MPS: Lava Rock Structures in South Central Idaho TR
- NRHP reference No.: 83002357
- Added to NRHP: September 8, 1983

The Galo Arambarri Boarding House near Shoshone, Idaho is a stone building that was built during 1913-1914 by Basque stonemason Ignacio Berriochoa. The building served as a boarding house for Basque men who worked as sheepherders in the area. It was listed on the National Register of Historic Places in 1983.

It is a one-and-a-half-story 31 feet (9.4 m) by 60 feet (18 m) structure with a narrow bargeboard on the front gable end of its roof. The stone walls on its sides rise 3 feet (0.91 m) higher than the stone walls at the front and rear. The long roof is interrupted by three shallow dormers facing to the side, each with a shallow gable roof and a narrow bargeboard.
