= Arthur D. Silva Water Tank =

- U.S. National Register of Historic Places
- Location within Idaho Location within the United States
- Nearest city: Shoshone, Idaho
- Coordinates: 42°59′43″N 114°27′14″W
- Area: less than one acre
- Built: c.1915, c.1925
- Built by: Darrah, Bill; Duffy, Pete & Sons
- MPS: Lava Rock Structures in South Central Idaho TR
- NRHP reference No.: 83002390
- Added to NRHP: September 8, 1983

The Arthur D. Silva Water Tank near Shoshone, Idaho, United States, was built in 1910. It was a work of sheep rancher and stonemason Bill Darrah and of stonemasons Pete Duffy & Sons. It was listed on the National Register of Historic Places in 1983.

It is a round water tank built of rubble walls about 20 feet (6.1 m) tall and 12 feet (3.7 m) in diameter. It is covered by a concrete-covered wooden top. It is located a few hundred yards above the Arthur D. Silva Ranch, which is itself about 3 miles (4.8 km) northwest of Shoshone.

The tank was deemed significant as an example of water tank construction, as an example of lava rock work by masons Bill Darrah and Pete Duffy and sons, and for its association with Portuguese settlement in South Central Idaho. It was built by Darrah in the late 1910s and was built higher by the Duffys in the late 1920s.

== See also ==
- Arthur D. Silva Ranch, NRHP-listed
- Arthur D. Silva Flume, NRHP-listed
- Manuel Silva Barn, NRHP-listed, a work of another local stonemason
