= J. W. and Rachel Newman House and Bunkhouse =

- U.S. National Register of Historic Places
- Location within Idaho Location within the United States
- Nearest city: Jerome, Idaho
- Coordinates: 42°39′53″N 114°19′28″W
- Area: less than one acre
- Built: c.1920
- Built by: Darrah, Bill
- Architectural style: Vernacular
- MPS: Lava Rock Structures in South Central Idaho TR
- NRHP reference No.: 83002332
- Added to NRHP: September 8, 1983

The J. W. and Rachel Newman House and Bunkhouse near Jerome, Idaho was built in the 1920s by sheep rancher and stonemason Bill Darrah. It was listed on the National Register of Historic Places in 1983. The listing included two contributing buildings.

It includes a lava rock house and a lava rock bunkhouse that was used for workers and for food storage. The house is about 27 feet (8.2 m) by 31 feet (9.4 m) and has coursed rubble walls. Mortar makes wide joints in the wall, as mortar is brought out to the face of the stones. It has a gable roof with narrow eaves. The house is enlarged by a frame addition across the rear that is about 12 feet (3.7 m) deep, with a lower gable roof. The bunkhouse is about 14 feet (4.3 m) by 18 feet (5.5 m).
