= Myers School Timbered Lodge (32BI401) =

- U.S. National Register of Historic Places
- Location: Address restricted
- Nearest city: Medora, North Dakota
- Area: 1 acre (0.40 ha)
- Built: 1850
- Architectural style: Timbered Lodge
- NRHP reference No.: 80002906
- Added to NRHP: August 6, 1980

The Myers School Timbered Lodge (32BI401) is a historic site located near Medora, North Dakota. It was listed on the National Register of Historic Places in 1980 and has historic significance relating to the year 1850. The precise address of the site is restricted.

Timbered lodges in the general area, i.e. in the southwestern part of the state, have been identified as archeological sites of interest. These are either conical-shaped or earthen lodges constructed by Mandan tribes or by others. A study of the Little Missouri River area in 2008 states that four timbered lodges were located in the South Unit of the Theodore Roosevelt National Park, which is just north of Medora. It noted that these may have Eurasian participation, i.e. not be built or used solely by indigenous peoples.
