= Dietrich, Idaho =

- City
- Motto: "A community with heart"
- Location of Dietrich in Lincoln County, Idaho.
- Coordinates: 42°54′46″N 114°15′59″W
- Country: United States
- State: Idaho
- County: Lincoln

Area
  - Total: 0.32 sq mi (0.84 km^{2})
  - Land: 0.32 sq mi (0.84 km^{2})
  - Water: 0 sq mi (0.00 km^{2})
- Elevation: 4,131 ft (1,259 m)

Population (2020)
  - Total: 284
  - Density: 880/sq mi (340/km^{2})
- Time zone: UTC-7 (Mountain (MST))
  - Summer (DST): UTC-6 (MDT)
- ZIP code: 83324
- Area codes: 208, 986
- FIPS code: 16-21790
- GNIS feature ID: 2410338
- Website: www.dietrichidaho.com

Dietrich is a city in Lincoln County, Idaho, United States. The population was 284 at the 2020 census.

== Geography ==
According to the United States Census Bureau, the city has a total area of 0.34 square miles (0.88 km^{2}), all of it land.

== Demographics ==
Historical population
Census	Pop.	Note	%±
1950	160		—
1960	118		−26.2%
1970	84		−28.8%
1980	101		20.2%
1990	127		25.7%
2000	150		18.1%
2010	332		121.3%
2020	284		−14.5%
2019 (est.)	341		2.7%
U.S. Decennial Census

=== 2010 census ===
As of the census of 2010, there were 332 people, 94 households, and 72 families living in the city. The population density was 976.5 inhabitants per square mile (377.0/km^{2}). There were 103 housing units at an average density of 302.9 per square mile (117.0/km^{2}). The racial makeup of the city was 90.1% White, 3.3% African American, 0.9% Native American, 0.3% Pacific Islander, and 5.4% from other races. Hispanic or Latino of any race were 10.2% of the population.

There were 94 households, of which 48.9% had children under the age of 18 living with them, 68.1% were married couples living together, 4.3% had a female householder with no husband present, 4.3% had a male householder with no wife present, and 23.4% were non-families. 21.3% of all households were made up of individuals, and 9.6% had someone living alone who was 65 years of age or older. The average household size was 3.53 and the average family size was 4.22.

The median age in the city was 25.4 years. 41.3% of residents were under the age of 18; 7.9% were between the ages of 18 and 24; 21% were from 25 to 44; 20.7% were from 45 to 64; and 8.7% were 65 years of age or older. The gender makeup of the city was 51.8% male and 48.2% female.

=== 2000 census ===
As of the census of 2000, there were 150 people, 58 households, and 41 families living in the city. The population density was 719.9 inhabitants per square mile (278.0/km^{2}). There were 62 housing units at an average density of 297.6 per square mile (114.9/km^{2}). The racial makeup of the city was 92.67% White, 0.67% African American, and 6.67% from two or more races. Hispanic or Latino of any race were 0.67% of the population.

There were 58 households, out of which 34.5% had children under the age of 18 living with them, 55.2% were married couples living together, 8.6% had a female householder with no husband present, and 29.3% were non-families. 27.6% of all households were made up of individuals, and 17.2% had someone living alone who was 65 years of age or older. The average household size was 2.59 and the average family size was 3.20.

In the city, the population was spread out, with 32.7% under the age of 18, 6.7% from 18 to 24, 20.0% from 25 to 44, 26.7% from 45 to 64, and 14.0% who were 65 years of age or older. The median age was 36 years. For every 100 females, there were 102.7 males. For every 100 females age 18 and over, there were 98.0 males.

The median income for a household in the city was $35,625, and the median income for a family was $45,833. Males had a median income of $28,125 versus $21,667 for females. The per capita income for the city was $12,888. There were 17.4% of families and 20.6% of the population living below the poverty line, including 22.5% of under eighteens and none of those over
