= Lincoln County, Idaho =

County in Idaho, United States

- County
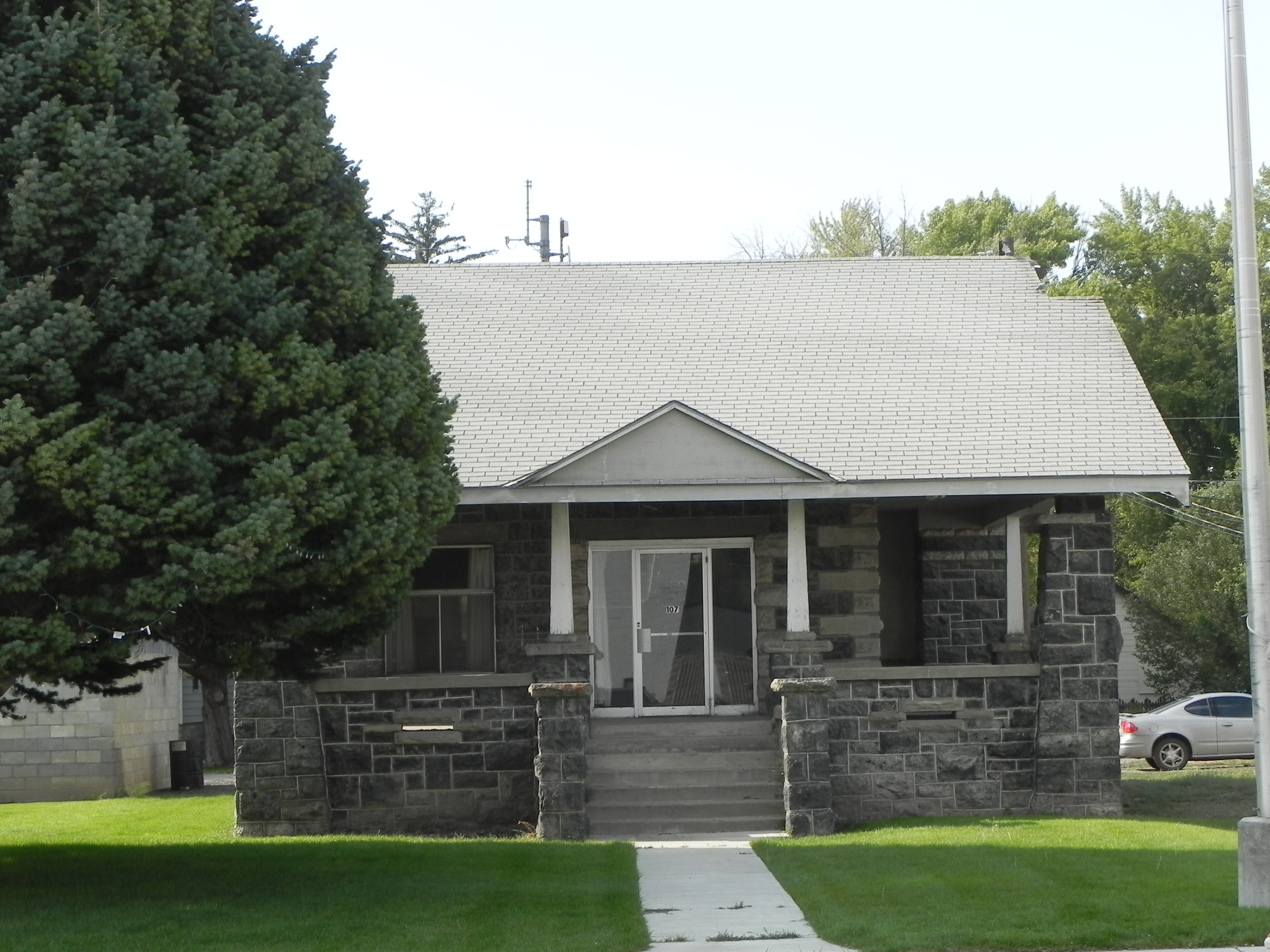
- American Legion Hall (Shoshone, Idaho)

- Seal

- Location within the U.S. state of Idaho
- Coordinates: 42°59′N 114°08′W
- Country: United States
- State: Idaho
- Founded: March 18, 1895
- Named for: Abraham Lincoln
- Seat: Shoshone
- Largest city: Shoshone

Area
  - Total: 1,206 sq mi (3,120 km^{2})
  - Land: 1,201 sq mi (3,110 km^{2})
  - Water: 4.5 sq mi (12 km^{2}) 0.4%

Population (2020)
  - Total: 5,127
  - Estimate (2025): 5,603 ▲
  - Density: 4.269/sq mi (1.648/km^{2})
- Time zone: UTC−7 (Mountain)
  - Summer (DST): UTC−6 (MDT)
- Congressional district: 2nd
- Website: www.lincolncountyid.gov

Lincoln County is a county located in the U.S. state of Idaho. As of the 2020 census, the population was 5,127. The county seat and largest city is Shoshone. The county is named after President Abraham Lincoln. The Idaho Territory was created in 1863, during the Lincoln Administration of 1861–65. Lincoln County is included in the Hailey, ID Micropolitan Statistical Area.

== History ==
Lincoln County was created by the Idaho Legislature on March 18, 1895, by a partitioning of Blaine County, which was created earlier that month by a merger of Alturas and Logan Counties. Lincoln County itself was partitioned on January 28, 1913, with a western portion becoming Gooding County and an eastern portion becoming Minidoka County. The county assumed its present borders on February 8, 1919, when a southern portion became Jerome County.

== Geography ==
According to the U.S. Census Bureau, the county has a total area of 1,206 square miles (3,120 km^{2}), of which 1,201 square miles (3,110 km^{2}) is land and 4.5 square miles (12 km^{2}) (0.4%) is water.

=== Adjacent counties ===
- Camas County - northwest
- Blaine County - north
- Minidoka County - east
- Jerome County - south
- Gooding County - west

=== Major highways ===
- US 26
- US 93
- SH-24
- SH-75 - Sawtooth Scenic Byway

=== National protected area ===
- Craters of the Moon National Monument and Preserve - (part)

== Demographics ==
Historical population
Census	Pop.	Note	%±
1900	1,784		—
1910	12,676		610.5%
1920	3,446		−72.8%
1930	3,242		−5.9%
1940	4,230		30.5%
1950	4,256		0.6%
1960	3,686		−13.4%
1970	3,057		−17.1%
1980	3,436		12.4%
1990	3,308		−3.7%
2000	4,044		22.2%
2010	5,208		28.8%
2020	5,127		−1.6%
2025 (est.)	5,603	▲	9.3%
U.S. Decennial Census; 1790–1960, 1900–1990, 1990–2000, 2010–2020

=== Racial and ethnic composition ===
Lincoln County, Idaho – Racial and ethnic composition Note: the US Census treats Hispanic/Latino as an ethnic category. This table excludes Latinos from the racial categories and assigns them to a separate category. Hispanics/Latinos may be of any race.
Race / Ethnicity (NH = Non-Hispanic)	Pop 1980	Pop 1990	Pop 2000	Pop 2010	Pop 2020	% 1980	% 1990	% 2000	% 2010	% 2020
White alone (NH)	3,157	3,075	3,375	3,607	3,245	91.88%	92.96%	83.46%	69.26%	63.29%
Black or African American alone (NH)	0	3	4	18	6	0.00%	0.09%	0.10%	0.35%	0.12%
Native American or Alaska Native alone (NH)	15	22	34	30	22	0.44%	0.67%	0.84%	0.58%	0.43%
Asian alone (NH)	24	12	17	18	10	0.70%	0.36%	0.42%	0.35%	0.20%
Native Hawaiian or Pacific Islander alone (NH)	x	x	2	3	4	x	x	0.05%	0.06%	0.08%
Other race alone (NH)	4	1	0	4	5	0.12%	0.03%	0.00%	0.08%	0.10%
Mixed race or Multiracial (NH)	x	x	70	52	196	x	x	1.73%	1.00%	3.82%
Hispanic or Latino (any race)	236	195	542	1,476	1,639	6.87%	5.89%	13.40%	28.34%	31.97%
Total	3,436	3,308	4,044	5,208	5,127	100.00%	100.00%	100.00%	100.00%	100.00%

=== 2020 census ===
As of the 2020 census, there were 5,127 people, 1,785 households, and the population density was 4.3 inhabitants per square mile (1.7/km²).

The median age was 36.5 years, 28.0% of residents were under the age of 18, 16.3% of residents were 65 years of age or older, and there were 109.9 males for every 100 females (111.8 males per 100 females age 18 and over).

Of the 1,785 households, 37.1% had children under the age of 18 living with them and 17.5% had a female householder with no spouse or partner present; 21.7% of all households were made up of individuals and 10.2% had someone living alone who was 65 years of age or older.

There were 1,948 housing units, of which 8.4% were vacant; 68.4% of occupied housing units were owner-occupied and 31.6% were renter-occupied, with homeowner and rental vacancy rates of 1.3% and 1.9%, respectively.

The racial makeup of the county was 70.1% White, 0.1% Black or African American, 1.5% American Indian and Alaska Native, 0.2% Asian, 0.1% Native Hawaiian and Pacific Islander, 15.7% from some other race, and 12.3% from two or more races; Hispanic or Latino residents of any race comprised 32.0% of the population.

0.0% of residents lived in urban areas while 100.0% lived in rural areas.

=== 2010 census ===
As of the 2010 United States census, there were 5,208 people, 1,705 households, and 1,271 families living in the county. The population density was 4.3 inhabitants per square mile (1.7/km^{2}). There were 1,976 housing units at an average density of 1.6 units per square mile (0.62 units/km^{2}). The racial makeup of the county was 80.1% white, 0.7% American Indian, 0.4% black or African American, 0.4% Asian, 0.1% Pacific islander, 16.2% from other races, and 2.2% from two or more races. Those of Hispanic or Latino origin made up 28.3% of the population. In terms of ancestry, 21.2% were German, 17.3% were English, 6.9% were Irish, and 6.1% were American.

Of the 1,705 households, 43.4% had children under the age of 18 living with them, 60.8% were married couples living together, 7.1% had a female householder with no husband present, 25.5% were non-families, and 20.5% of all households were made up of individuals. The average household size was 3.03 and the average family size was 3.52. The median age was 32.0 years.

The median income for a household in the county was $45,714 and the median income for a family was $50,543. Males had a median income of $37,639 versus $30,080 for females. The per capita income for the county was $19,011. About 10.9% of families and 15.3% of the population were below the poverty line, including 19.4% of those under age 18 and 25.0% of those age 65 or over.

=== 2000 census ===
As of the census of 2000, there were 4,044 people, 1,447 households, and 1,050 families living in the county. The population density was 3 people per square mile (1.2 people/km^{2}). There were 1,651 housing units at an average density of 1 units per square mile (0.39 units/km^{2}). The racial makeup of the county was 86.47% White, 0.47% Black or African American, 1.21% Native American, 0.45% Asian, 0.05% Pacific Islander, 9.42% from other races, and 1.93% from two or more races. 13.40% of the population were Hispanic or Latino of any race. 16.8% were of English, 12.4% American, 11.5% German and 8.3% Irish ancestry.

There were 1,447 households, out of which 37.70% had children under the age of 18 living with them, 61.50% were married couples living together, 5.50% had a female householder with no husband present, and 27.40% were non-families. 22.90% of all households were made up of individuals, and 10.20% had someone living alone who was 65 years of age or older. The average household size was 2.77 and the average family size was 3.27.

In the county, the population was spread out, with 30.40% under the age of 18, 9.00% from 18 to 24, 25.50% from 25 to 44, 22.00% from 45 to 64, and 13.10% who were 65 years of age or older. The median age was 34 years. For every 100 females there were 106.50 males. For every 100 females age 18 and over, there were 105.80 males.

The median income for a household in the county was $32,484, and the median income for a family was $36,792. Males had a median income of $26,576 versus $20,032 for females. The per capita income for the county was $14,257. 13.10% of the population and 10.80% of families were below the poverty line. Out of the total population, 18.30% of those under the age of 18 and 7.00% of those 65 and older were living below the poverty line.

== Communities ==
=== Cities ===
- Dietrich
- Richfield
- Shoshone

=== Unincorporated communities ===
- Hidden Valley (includes parts of Minidoka County and Jerome County)
- Kimama (includes parts of Minidoka County)

== Politics ==
United States presidential election results for Lincoln County, Idaho
Year	Republican		Democratic		Third party(ies)	
Year	No.	%	No.	%	No.	%
1900	370	51.03%	355	48.97%	0	0.00%
1904	688	68.19%	262	25.97%	59	5.85%
1908	1,310	54.33%	804	33.35%	297	12.32%
1912	1,191	23.41%	1,541	30.29%	2,355	46.29%
1916	1,121	48.59%	1,084	46.99%	102	4.42%
1920	755	63.87%	427	36.13%	0	0.00%
1924	692	54.36%	154	12.10%	427	33.54%
1928	865	70.50%	358	29.18%	4	0.33%
1932	691	43.51%	869	54.72%	28	1.76%
1936	766	44.51%	916	53.22%	39	2.27%
1940	1,009	53.05%	886	46.58%	7	0.37%
1944	934	54.30%	784	45.58%	2	0.12%
1948	851	52.63%	748	46.26%	18	1.11%
1952	1,383	71.11%	562	28.89%	0	0.00%
1956	1,069	61.83%	660	38.17%	0	0.00%
1960	970	55.33%	783	44.67%	0	0.00%
1964	969	61.10%	617	38.90%	0	0.00%
1968	972	62.91%	350	22.65%	223	14.43%
1972	1,120	74.37%	313	20.78%	73	4.85%
1976	909	57.75%	615	39.07%	50	3.18%
1980	1,294	69.12%	462	24.68%	116	6.20%
1984	1,211	74.98%	386	23.90%	18	1.11%
1988	918	60.20%	574	37.64%	33	2.16%
1992	656	38.61%	514	30.25%	529	31.14%
1996	744	47.63%	478	30.60%	340	21.77%
2000	1,049	66.65%	437	27.76%	88	5.59%
2004	1,388	73.99%	466	24.84%	22	1.17%
2008	1,232	65.88%	545	29.14%	93	4.97%
2012	1,141	68.61%	469	28.20%	53	3.19%
2016	1,184	67.73%	360	20.59%	204	11.67%
2020	1,469	75.68%	414	21.33%	58	2.99%
2024	1,466	76.47%	392	20.45%	59	3.08%

== Education ==
School districts include:

- Dietrich School District 314
- Gooding Joint School District 231
- Jerome Joint School District 261
- Minidoka County Joint School District 331
- Richfield School District 316
- Shoshone Joint School District 312

The county is in the catchment area, but not the taxation zone, for College of Southern Idaho.

== See also ==
- National Register of Historic Places listings in Lincoln County, Idaho
