= Richfield, Idaho =

- City
- Location of Richfield in Lincoln County, Idaho.
- Coordinates: 43°03′08″N 114°09′20″W
- Country: United States
- State: Idaho
- County: Lincoln

Area
  - Total: 0.66 sq mi (1.70 km^{2})
  - Land: 0.66 sq mi (1.70 km^{2})
  - Water: 0 sq mi (0.00 km^{2})
- Elevation: 4,311 ft (1,314 m)

Population (2020)
  - Total: 431
  - Density: 756/sq mi (291.8/km^{2})
- Time zone: UTC-7 (Mountain (MST))
  - Summer (DST): UTC-6 (MDT)
- ZIP code: 83349
- Area codes: 208, 986
- FIPS code: 16-67600
- GNIS feature ID: 2410934
- Website: www.richfield-id.com

Richfield is a city in Lincoln County, Idaho, in the United States. As of the 2020 census, Richfield had a population of 431.

== Geography ==
According to the United States Census Bureau, the city has a total area of 0.66 square miles (1.71 km^{2}), all of it land.

The Little Wood River flows nearby, and the Richfield region is supplied with irrigation water diverted from the Big Wood River near Magic Reservoir.

== History ==
A book about the History of the Richfield area was written in 1995 by Alice Crane Behr and Maureen Hancock Ward. It was subsequently published and printed. The text of this book is available at the Richfield City Website.

== Education ==
Richfield students are served by the grades K-12 Richfield School.

== Climate ==
According to the Köppen Climate Classification system, Richfield has a cold semi-arid climate, abbreviated "BSk" on climate maps. The hottest temperature recorded in Richfield was 105 °F (40.6 °C) on July 2, 1924, July 27–29, 1994, and August 9, 1990, while the coldest temperature recorded was −40 °F (−40.0 °C) on February 9, 1933.

Climate data for Richfield, Idaho, 1991–2020 normals, extremes 1910–present
Month	Jan	Feb	Mar	Apr	May	Jun	Jul	Aug	Sep	Oct	Nov	Dec	Year
Record high °F (°C)	60 (16)	65 (18)	76 (24)	90 (32)	99 (37)	103 (39)	105 (41)	105 (41)	103 (39)	91 (33)	72 (22)	64 (18)	105 (41)
Mean maximum °F (°C)	42.5 (5.8)	48.9 (9.4)	64.3 (17.9)	76.6 (24.8)	84.9 (29.4)	93.7 (34.3)	99.9 (37.7)	98.3 (36.8)	92.3 (33.5)	79.6 (26.4)	61.9 (16.6)	46.2 (7.9)	100.8 (38.2)
Mean daily maximum °F (°C)	31.7 (−0.2)	37.2 (2.9)	48.6 (9.2)	58.3 (14.6)	68.4 (20.2)	78.0 (25.6)	88.9 (31.6)	87.9 (31.1)	77.3 (25.2)	62.2 (16.8)	45.2 (7.3)	32.6 (0.3)	59.7 (15.4)
Daily mean °F (°C)	22.8 (−5.1)	27.5 (−2.5)	36.8 (2.7)	44.5 (6.9)	53.6 (12.0)	62.0 (16.7)	71.0 (21.7)	70.0 (21.1)	60.2 (15.7)	47.2 (8.4)	34.1 (1.2)	24.0 (−4.4)	46.1 (7.9)
Mean daily minimum °F (°C)	13.9 (−10.1)	17.7 (−7.9)	25.0 (−3.9)	30.6 (−0.8)	38.9 (3.8)	45.9 (7.7)	53.1 (11.7)	52.1 (11.2)	43.1 (6.2)	32.2 (0.1)	22.9 (−5.1)	15.4 (−9.2)	32.6 (0.3)
Mean minimum °F (°C)	−3.9 (−19.9)	0.4 (−17.6)	10.6 (−11.9)	19.4 (−7.0)	25.7 (−3.5)	33.6 (0.9)	42.7 (5.9)	41.1 (5.1)	30.8 (−0.7)	17.9 (−7.8)	6.2 (−14.3)	−3.0 (−19.4)	−9.5 (−23.1)
Record low °F (°C)	−38 (−39)	−40 (−40)	−18 (−28)	0 (−18)	16 (−9)	21 (−6)	29 (−2)	25 (−4)	14 (−10)	−1 (−18)	−20 (−29)	−36 (−38)	−40 (−40)
Average precipitation inches (mm)	1.53 (39)	0.91 (23)	1.01 (26)	0.88 (22)	1.09 (28)	0.70 (18)	0.17 (4.3)	0.29 (7.4)	0.49 (12)	0.87 (22)	0.92 (23)	1.66 (42)	10.52 (266.7)
Average snowfall inches (cm)	11.5 (29)	6.7 (17)	1.0 (2.5)	0.3 (0.76)	0.0 (0.0)	0.0 (0.0)	0.0 (0.0)	0.0 (0.0)	0.0 (0.0)	0.1 (0.25)	2.1 (5.3)	6.9 (18)	28.6 (72.81)
Average precipitation days (≥ 0.01 in)	7.8	6.7	6.8	6.5	6.8	4.0	1.8	2.2	3.6	5.0	5.7	7.5	64.4
Average snowy days (≥ 0.1 in)	4.5	2.3	0.5	0.1	0.0	0.0	0.0	0.0	0.0	0.1	0.9	2.9	11.3
Source 1: NOAA
Source 2: National Weather Service

== Demographics ==
Historical population
Census	Pop.	Note	%±
1910	158		—
1920	333		110.8%
1930	193		−42.0%
1940	390		102.1%
1950	429		10.0%
1960	329		−23.3%
1970	290		−11.9%
1980	357		23.1%
1990	383		7.3%
2000	412		7.6%
2010	482		17.0%
2020	431		−10.6%
2019 (est.)	496		2.9%
U.S. Decennial Census

=== 2010 census ===
At the 2010 census there were 482 people in 172 households, including 124 families, in the city. The population density was 730.3 inhabitants per square mile (282.0/km^{2}). There were 195 housing units at an average density of 295.5 per square mile (114.1/km^{2}). The racial makup of the city was 89.4% White, 0.6% Native American, 8.1% from other races, and 1.9% from two or more races. Hispanic or Latino of any race were 12.2%.

Of the 172 households 41.9% had children under the age of 18 living with them, 57.0% were married couples living together, 7.6% had a female householder with no husband present, 7.6% had a male householder with no wife present, and 27.9% were non-families. 21.5% of households were one person and 11.1% were one person aged 65 or older. The average household size was 2.80 and the average family size was 3.28.

The median age was 32.2 years. 28.8% of residents were under the age of 18; 11.4% were between the ages of 18 and 24; 25.9% were from 25 to 44; 20.7% were from 45 to 64; and 13.1% were 65 or older. The gender makeup of the city was 51.0% male and 49.0% female.

=== 2000 census ===
At the 2000 census there were 412 people in 15 households, including 3 families, in the city. The population density was 33.6 inhabitants per square mile (13.0/km^{2}). There were 18 housing units at an average density of 36.8 per square mile (14.2/km^{2}). The racial makup of the city was 90.78% White, 0.24% African American, 0.73% Native American, 6.07% from other races, and 2.18% from two or more races. Hispanic or Latino of any race were 8.50%.

Of the 15 households 32.7% had children under the age of 18 living with them, 56.6% were married couples living together, 5.7% had a female householder with no husband present, and 34.6% were non-families. 28.9% of households were one person and 17.0% were one person aged 65 or older. The average household size was 2.59 and the average family size was 3.25.

The age distribution was 30.8% under the age of 18, 9.5% from 18 to 24, 26.0% from 25 to 44, 20.6% from 45 to 64, and 13.1% 65 or older. The median age was 32 years. For every 10 females there were 34.0 males. For every 10 females age 18 and over, there were 33.7 males.

The median household income was $28,846 and the median family income was $13,173. Males had a median income of $9,028 versus $2,833 for females. The per capita income for the city was $12,759. About 11.0% of families and 12.6% of the population were below the poverty line, including 14.2% of those under age 18 and 16.2% of those age 65 or over.

== See also ==
- List of cities in Idaho
