= Shoshone, Idaho =

- City
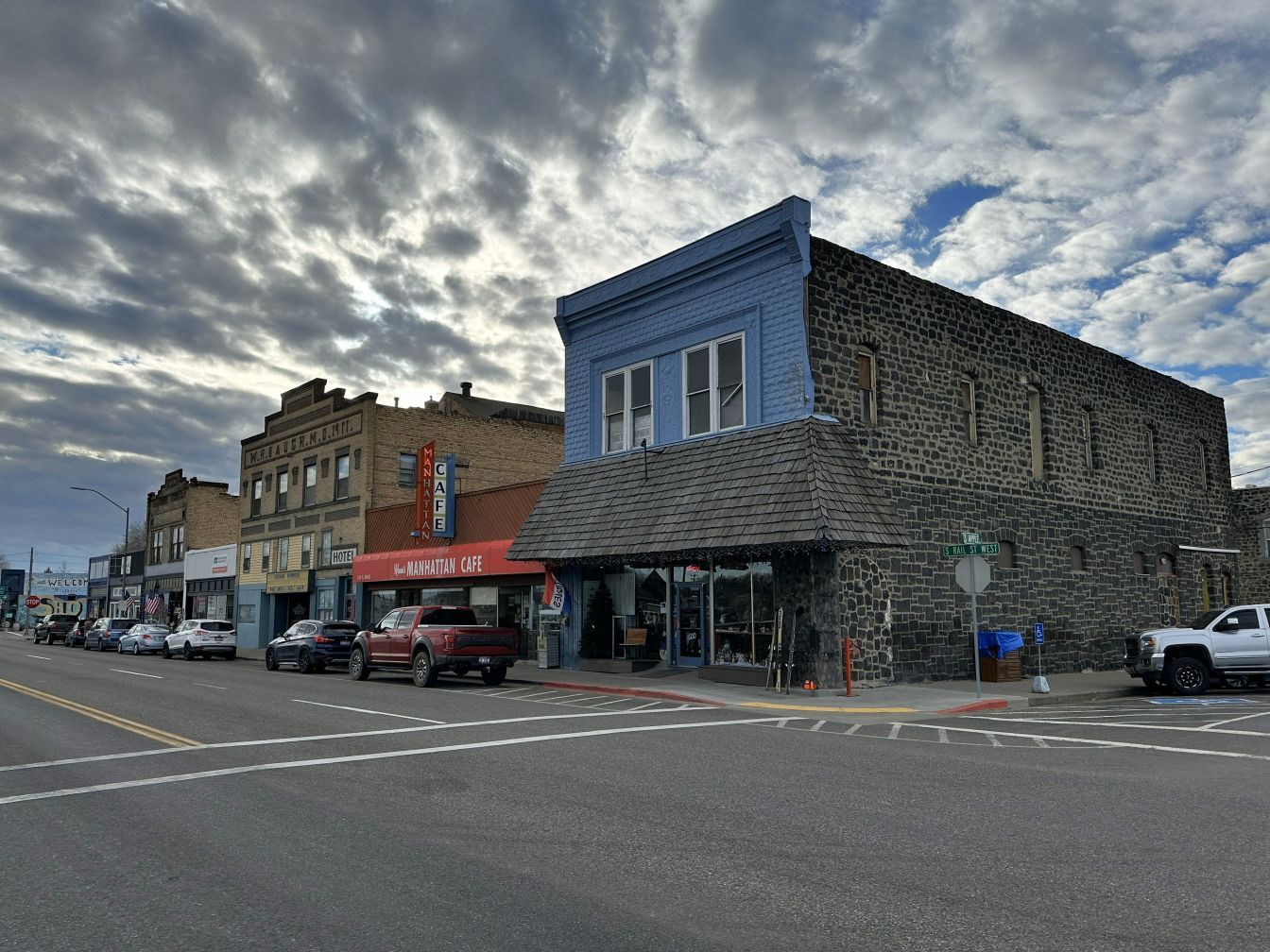
- Downtown Shoshone

- Location of Shoshone in Lincoln County, Idaho.
- Coordinates: 42°56′13″N 114°24′20″W
- Country: United States
- State: Idaho
- County: Lincoln
- Founded: 1882, 144 years ago

Area
  - Total: 1.20 sq mi (3.10 km^{2})
  - Land: 1.17 sq mi (3.04 km^{2})
  - Water: 0.023 sq mi (0.06 km^{2})
- Elevation: 3,963 ft (1,208 m)

Population (2020)
  - Total: 1,653
  - Density: 1,280.0/sq mi (494.23/km^{2})
- Time zone: UTC-7 (Mountain (MST))
  - Summer (DST): UTC-6 (MDT)
- ZIP codes: 83324, 83352
- Area codes: 208, 986
- FIPS code: 16-73900
- GNIS feature ID: 2411894
- Website: www.shoshonecityid.gov

Shoshone (/ʃoʊˈʃoʊn/ shoh-SHOHN) is the county seat of and the largest city in Lincoln County, Idaho, United States. The population was 1,653 at the 2020 census. In contrast to the Shoshone Native American tribe for which it is named, the city's name is correctly pronounced "Show-shown", with a silent "e".

== History ==
Founded in 1882 during the construction of the Oregon Short Line, Shoshone has long been considered the main railroad station in south central Idaho's Magic Valley region. The much larger community of Twin Falls 26 miles (42 km) to the south never developed a strong railroad presence due to the logistical issues presented by its location south of the Snake River Canyon. For many years, Shoshone was the only Amtrak stop in south central Idaho.

The Union Pacific Railroad opened the Sun Valley resort in 1936 (and owned it until 1964), and its pre-existing spur route to Ketchum connected here. The spur first headed northeast, following today's US 93, to Richfield and Tikura, then peeled northwest to Picabo and on to Bellevue, Hailey, and Ketchum, so the distance was greater than today's more direct 55-mile (90 km) drive north on Highway 75.

About 15 miles (25 km) north of Shoshone are the Shoshone Ice Caves. The caves are lava tubes that stay cool enough for the ice inside them to remain frozen throughout the summer. In the days before refrigeration, this feature, coupled with the railroad, made Shoshone popular with travelers as "the only place for hundreds of miles where one could get a cold beer."

== Economy ==
Today, Shoshone still has one bar, but also boasts a cafe and a grocery store—unusual for such a small town. While limited retail jobs exist, Shoshone is primarily a farming and dairy community.

Shoshone is home to a Bureau of Land Management (BLM) facility. The town also has a small medical clinic, and recently built a new K-12 school building.

In recent years, Shoshone has become a bedroom community for workers of neighboring Blaine County, due to a significant difference in cost of living. The resort cities of Ketchum and Sun Valley are about an hour north on Highway 75. This commuting phenomenon has contributed greatly to recent growth in the Shoshone area. Shoshone also has a few historical buildings.

== Geography ==
According to the United States Census Bureau, the city has a total area of 1.16 square miles (3.00 km^{2}), of which, 1.14 square miles (2.95 km^{2}) is land and 0.02 square miles (0.05 km^{2}) is water. The Little Wood River runs through the town.

Much of the land around Shoshone is lava rock, which can make excavation for building problematic, and limits the amount of useful farmland.

=== Climate ===
Under the Köppen climate classification, Shoshone has a cold semi-arid climate (BSk).

Climate data for Shoshone, Idaho, 1991–2020 normals, extremes 1908–present
Month	Jan	Feb	Mar	Apr	May	Jun	Jul	Aug	Sep	Oct	Nov	Dec	Year
Record high °F (°C)	60 (16)	65 (18)	79 (26)	90 (32)	101 (38)	105 (41)	109 (43)	105 (41)	104 (40)	93 (34)	77 (25)	67 (19)	109 (43)
Mean maximum °F (°C)	45.6 (7.6)	52.6 (11.4)	67.3 (19.6)	78.5 (25.8)	88.5 (31.4)	96.3 (35.7)	102.4 (39.1)	100.4 (38.0)	93.4 (34.1)	81.3 (27.4)	63.4 (17.4)	48.1 (8.9)	103.0 (39.4)
Mean daily maximum °F (°C)	37.2 (2.9)	43.0 (6.1)	54.5 (12.5)	63.5 (17.5)	73.8 (23.2)	84.0 (28.9)	94.1 (34.5)	92.4 (33.6)	81.4 (27.4)	65.9 (18.8)	49.5 (9.7)	37.7 (3.2)	64.8 (18.2)
Daily mean °F (°C)	30.2 (−1.0)	34.6 (1.4)	43.6 (6.4)	50.8 (10.4)	60.2 (15.7)	68.8 (20.4)	77.9 (25.5)	76.2 (24.6)	66.1 (18.9)	53.1 (11.7)	40.3 (4.6)	30.7 (−0.7)	52.7 (11.5)
Mean daily minimum °F (°C)	23.3 (−4.8)	26.1 (−3.3)	32.7 (0.4)	38.2 (3.4)	46.7 (8.2)	53.5 (11.9)	61.7 (16.5)	59.9 (15.5)	50.9 (10.5)	40.2 (4.6)	31.1 (−0.5)	23.8 (−4.6)	40.7 (4.8)
Mean minimum °F (°C)	1.5 (−16.9)	6.8 (−14.0)	15.4 (−9.2)	22.3 (−5.4)	29.9 (−1.2)	36.9 (2.7)	46.6 (8.1)	44.6 (7.0)	33.8 (1.0)	22.1 (−5.5)	11.5 (−11.4)	2.6 (−16.3)	−3.4 (−19.7)
Record low °F (°C)	−36 (−38)	−35 (−37)	−11 (−24)	1 (−17)	15 (−9)	27 (−3)	32 (0)	29 (−2)	16 (−9)	8 (−13)	−20 (−29)	−27 (−33)	−36 (−38)
Average precipitation inches (mm)	1.57 (40)	0.90 (23)	1.14 (29)	0.81 (21)	1.07 (27)	0.56 (14)	0.16 (4.1)	0.30 (7.6)	0.46 (12)	0.76 (19)	1.02 (26)	1.72 (44)	10.47 (266.7)
Average snowfall inches (cm)	4.2 (11)	3.3 (8.4)	0.8 (2.0)	0.0 (0.0)	0.0 (0.0)	0.0 (0.0)	0.0 (0.0)	0.0 (0.0)	0.0 (0.0)	0.0 (0.0)	2.2 (5.6)	5.7 (14)	16.2 (41)
Average precipitation days (≥ 0.01 in)	7.8	6.5	6.7	6.7	5.8	3.7	1.3	1.9	3.0	4.4	5.8	7.9	61.5
Average snowy days (≥ 0.1 in)	2.5	1.7	0.4	0.0	0.0	0.0	0.0	0.0	0.0	0.0	1.1	2.5	8.2
Source 1: NOAA
Source 2: National Weather Service (snow/snow days 1981–2010)

== Highways ==
- - US 26
- - US 93
- - SH-24
- - SH-75 - Sawtooth Scenic Byway

The four highways converge in Shoshone, the southern terminus of SH 75. Traffic between the Magic Valley and Sun Valley passes through Shoshone, maintaining its early heritage as a brief rest stop for travelers.

== Demographics ==
Historical population
Census	Pop.	Note	%±
1910	1,155		—
1920	1,165		0.9%
1930	1,211		3.9%
1940	1,366		12.8%
1950	1,420		4.0%
1960	1,416		−0.3%
1970	1,233		−12.9%
1980	1,242		0.7%
1990	1,249		0.6%
2000	1,398		11.9%
2010	1,461		4.5%
2020	1,653		13.1%
U.S. Decennial Census

=== 2020 census ===
As of the 2020 census, Shoshone had a population of 1,653. The median age was 35.0 years. 26.9% of residents were under the age of 18 and 16.3% of residents were 65 years of age or older. For every 100 females there were 100.6 males, and for every 100 females age 18 and over there were 101.3 males age 18 and over.

0.0% of residents lived in urban areas, while 100.0% lived in rural areas.

There were 593 households in Shoshone, of which 40.5% had children under the age of 18 living in them. Of all households, 47.4% were married-couple households, 20.2% were households with a male householder and no spouse or partner present, and 24.5% were households with a female householder and no spouse or partner present. About 23.6% of all households were made up of individuals and 12.3% had someone living alone who was 65 years of age or older.

There were 645 housing units, of which 8.1% were vacant. The homeowner vacancy rate was 2.1% and the rental vacancy rate was 2.2%.

Racial composition as of the 2020 census
Race	Number	Percent
White	1,020	61.7%
Black or African American	3	0.2%
American Indian and Alaska Native	38	2.3%
Asian	6	0.4%
Native Hawaiian and Other Pacific Islander	1	0.1%
Some other race	355	21.5%
Two or more races	230	13.9%
Hispanic or Latino (of any race)	690	41.7%

=== 2010 census ===
As of the census of 2010, there were 1,461 people, 542 households, and 349 families residing in the city. The population density was 1,281.6 inhabitants per square mile (494.8/km^{2}). There were 647 housing units at an average density of 567.5 per square mile (219.1/km^{2}). The racial makeup of the city was 81.0% White, 0.1% African American, 0.8% Native American, 0.7% Asian, 0.1% Pacific Islander, 14.5% from other races, and 2.8% from two or more races. Hispanic or Latino of any race were 29.4% of the population.

There were 542 households, of which 38.4% had children under the age of 18 living with them, 48.3% were married couples living together, 10.0% had a female householder with no husband present, 6.1% had a male householder with no wife present, and 35.6% were non-families. 30.3% of all households were made up of individuals, and 13.8% had someone living alone who was 65 years of age or older. The average household size was 2.63 and the average family size was 3.29.

The median age in the city was 33 years. 29.4% of residents were under the age of 18; 8.3% were between the ages of 18 and 24; 24.6% were from 25 to 44; 22.2% were from 45 to 64; and 15.7% were 65 years of age or older. The gender makeup of the city was 48.5% male and 51.5% female.

=== 2000 census ===
As of the census of 2000, there were 1,398 people, 547 households, and 355 families residing in the city. The population density was 1,432.0 inhabitants per square mile (552.9/km^{2}). There were 615 housing units at an average density of 629.9 per square mile (243.2/km^{2}). Apartments are scarce, and most of the neighborhoods are decades old. There has been a small amount of new construction and Shoshone has experienced slow growth since the year 2000, due in part to commuters who work in Sun Valley but choose to live in Shoshone because of the comparatively lower cost of living.

The racial makeup of the city was 88.91% White, 0.07% African American, 1.43% Native American, 0.79% Asian, 0.14% Pacific Islander, 7.65% from other races, and 1.00% from two or more races. Hispanic or Latino of any race were 11.30% of the population.

There were 547 households, out of which 32.4% had children under the age of 18 living with them, 51.0% were married couples living together, 9.0% had a female householder with no husband present, and 35.1% were non-families. 30.0% of all households were made up of individuals, and 14.8% had someone living alone who was 65 years of age or older. The average household size was 2.49 and the average family size was 3.10.

In the city, the population was spread out, with 27.1% under the age of 18, 8.9% from 18 to 24, 24.8% from 25 to 44, 19.5% from 45 to 64, and 19.6% who were 65 years of age or older. The median age was 36 years. For every 100 females, there were 94.2 males. For every 100 females age 18 and over, there were 92.6 males.

The median income for a household in the city was $31,036, and the median income for a family was $35,787. Males had a median income of $29,479 versus $20,417 for females. The per capita income for the city was $14,756. About 11.1% of families and 13.8% of the population were below the poverty line, including 21.1% of those under age 18 and 7.2% of those age 65 or over.

== Education ==
Shoshone School District is the local school district.

== Notable people ==
- Jack M. Murphy (1925-1984) - American politician. Murphy was the 32nd lieutenant governor of Idaho.
- Tim Ridinger - American politician. Ridinger is a former mayor and member of Idaho House of Representatives.

== See also ==
- List of cities in Idaho
