= List of colleges and universities in Idaho =

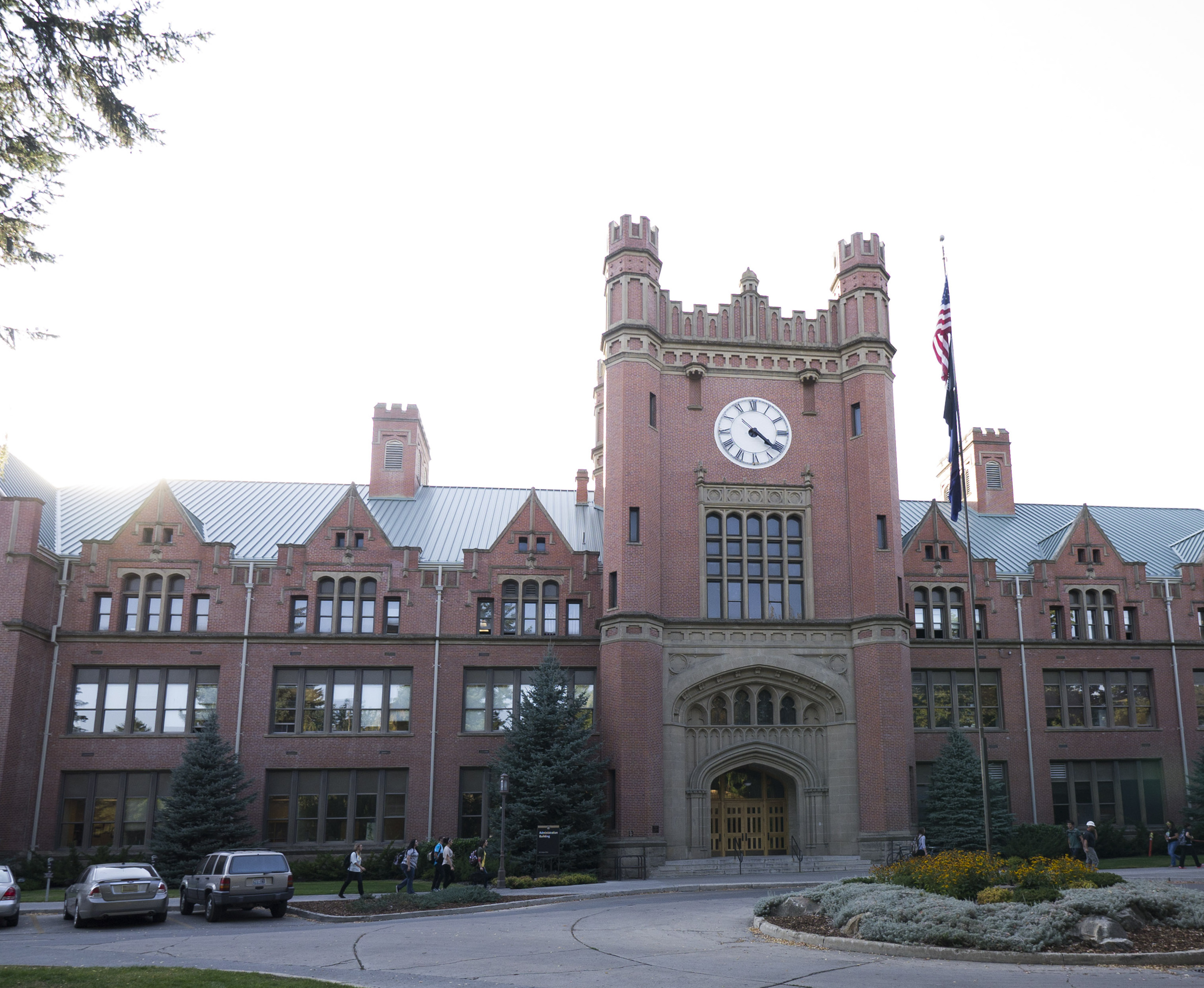
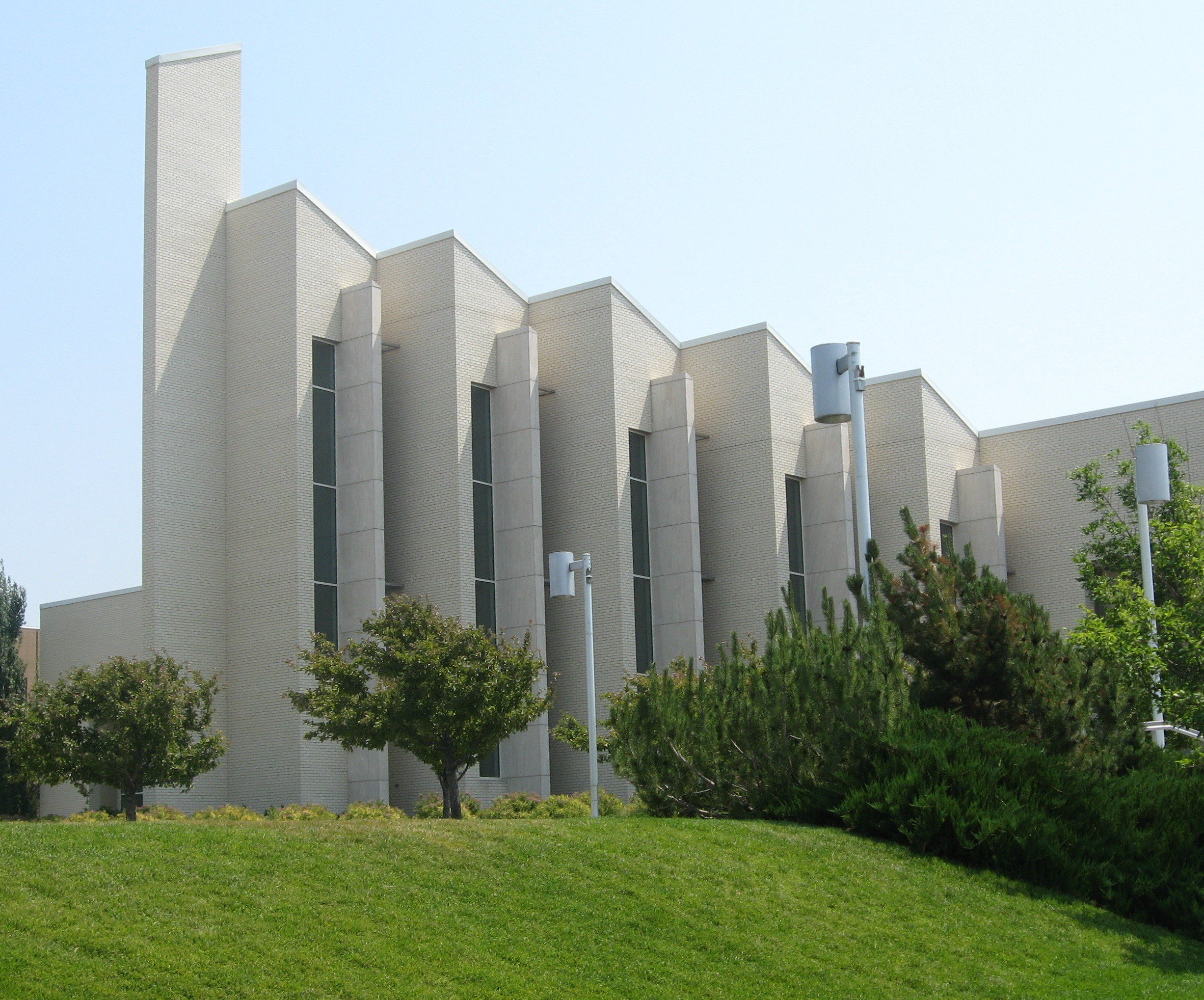
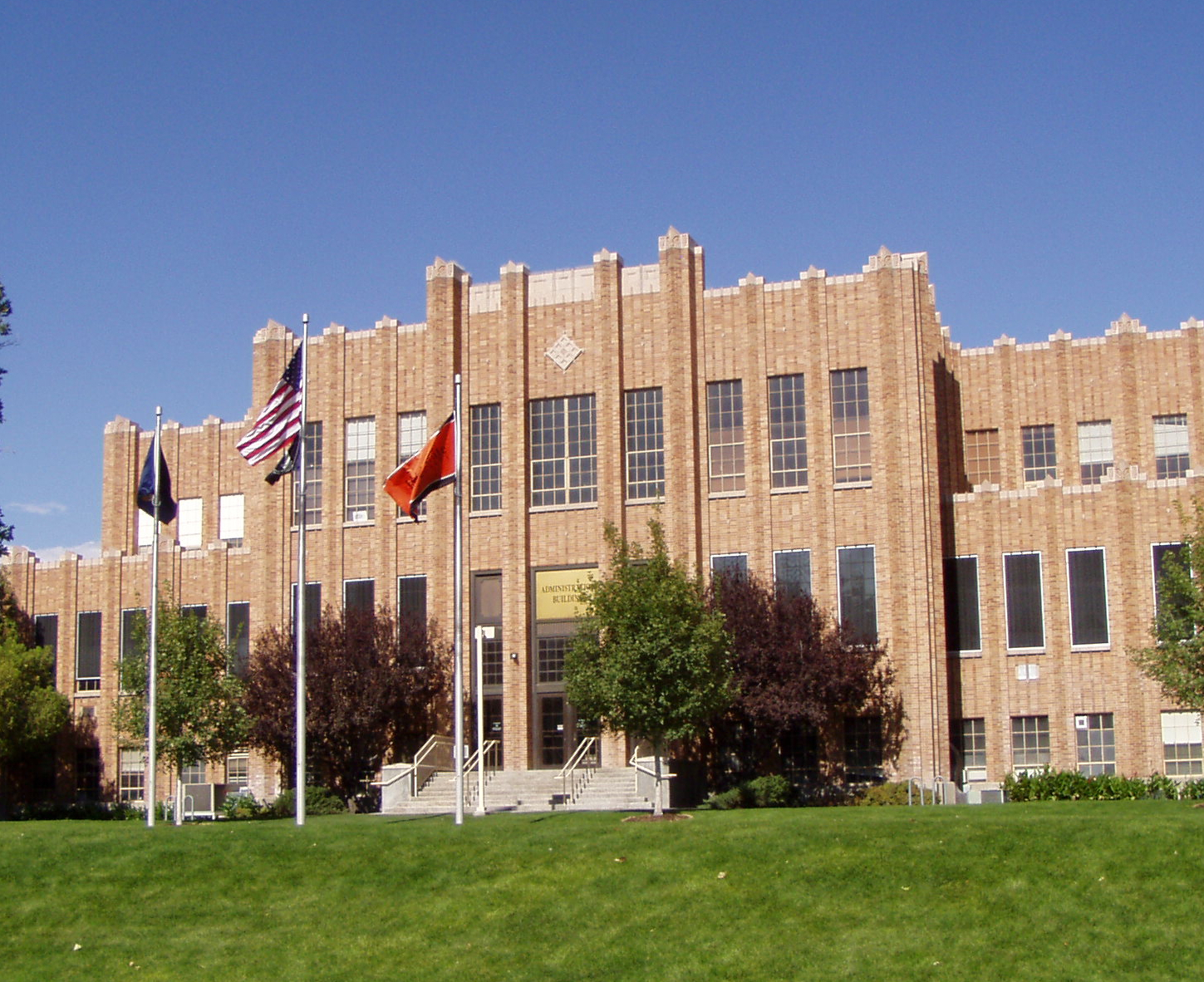
The Administration Building at the University of Idaho (left), the John Taylor Building at Brigham Young University–Idaho (middle), and the Administration Building at Idaho State University (right)

This is a list of colleges and universities in Idaho. This list also includes other educational institutions providing higher education, meaning tertiary, quaternary, and, in some cases, post-secondary education.

== Open institutions ==
The Idaho State Board of Education oversees three comprehensive universities. The University of Idaho in Moscow was the state's inaugural university, founded in 1889. It opened its doors in 1892 and is the land-grant institution and primary research university of the state. Idaho State University in Pocatello opened in 1901 as the Academy of Idaho, attained four-year status in 1947 and university status in 1963. Boise State University is the most recent school to attain university status in Idaho. The school opened in 1932 as Boise Junior College and became Boise State University in 1974. Lewis–Clark State College in Lewiston is the only public, non-university 4-year college in Idaho. It opened as a normal school in 1893.

Idaho has four regional community colleges: North Idaho College in Coeur d'Alene; College of Southern Idaho in Twin Falls; College of Western Idaho in Nampa, which opened in 2009, College of Eastern Idaho in Idaho Falls, which transitioned from a technical college in 2017.

Private institutions in Idaho are Boise Bible College, affiliated with congregations of the Christian churches and churches of Christ; Brigham Young University–Idaho in Rexburg, which is affiliated with the Church of Jesus Christ of Latter-day Saints and a sister college to Brigham Young University; The College of Idaho in Caldwell, which still maintains a loose affiliation with the Presbyterian Church; Northwest Nazarene University in Nampa; and New Saint Andrews College in Moscow, of reformed Christian theological background. McCall College is a non-affiliated 2-year private college in McCall, which was founded in 2011.

School	Location(s)	Control	Type	Enrollment (Fall 2024)	Founded
Boise Bible College	Boise	Private not-for-profit	Special-focus institution	94	1945
Boise State University	Boise	Public	Doctoral/research university	27,198	1932
Brigham Young University–Idaho	Rexburg	Private not-for-profit	Baccalaureate college	45,585	1888
College of Idaho	Caldwell	Private not-for-profit	Baccalaureate college	1,090	1891
Idaho College of Osteopathic Medicine	Meridian	Private		632	2016
College of Southern Idaho	Twin Falls	Public	Associate's college	10,176	1965
College of Western Idaho	Nampa	Public	Associate's college	11,015	2007
College of Eastern Idaho	Idaho Falls	Public	Associate's college	3,013	1969
Idaho State University	Pocatello	Public	Doctoral/research university	13,061	1901
Lewis–Clark State College	Lewiston	Public	Baccalaureate college	3,801	1893
New Saint Andrews College	Moscow	Private	Baccalaureate college	413	1994
North Idaho College	Coeur d'Alene	Public	Associate's college	4,585	1933
Northwest Nazarene University	Nampa	Private not-for-profit	Master's university	1,635	1913
University of Idaho	Moscow	Public	Doctoral/research university	12,286	1889

== Defunct institutions ==
Four now-defunct institutions were located in Idaho:

Defunct institutions
School	Location	Control	Founded	Closed	Ref
Albion State Normal School	Albion	Public	1893	1951	
Farragut College and Technical Institute	Bayview	Private	1946	1949	
Gooding College	Gooding	Private (Methodist Church)	1917	1938	
Magic Valley Christian College	Albion	Private (Churches of Christ)	1958	1969	
Stevens–Henager College	Idaho Falls and Boise	Private	1891	2021	

== See also ==
- List of college athletic programs in Idaho
- Higher education in the United States
- Lists of American institutions of higher education
- List of recognized higher education accreditation organizations
- Lists of universities and colleges
- Lists of universities and colleges by country
