= Winchester Lake =

Lake in Idaho, United States

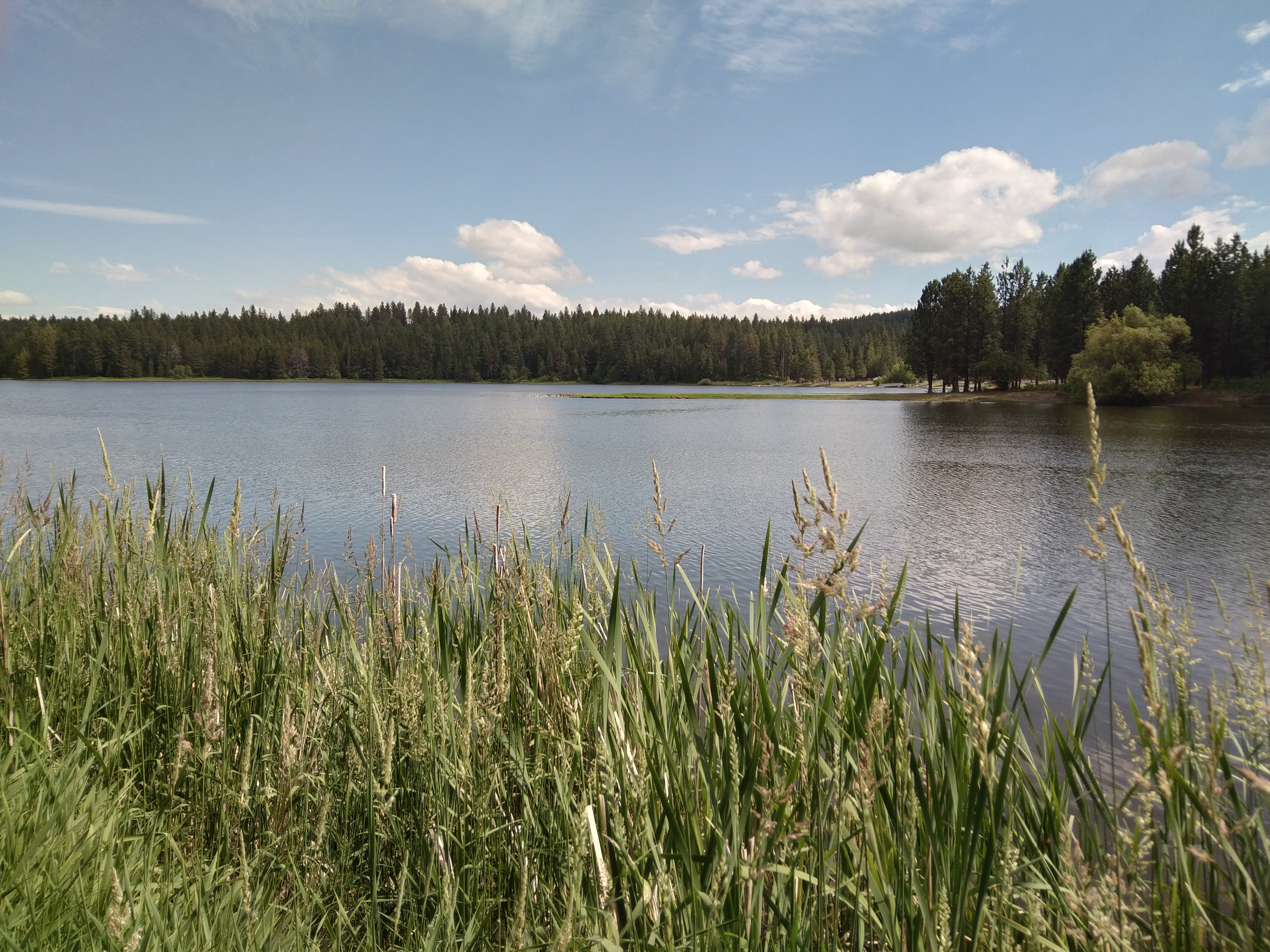

- Location in state of Idaho
- Location: Lewis County, Idaho, United States
- Coordinates: 46°14′05″N 116°37′13″W
- Type: Reservoir
- Primary inflows: Lapwai Creek
- Primary outflows: Lapwai Creek to Clearwater River
- Catchment area: 7,800 acres (3,200 ha)
- Basin countries: United States
- Managing agency: Idaho Department of Parks and Recreation
- Built: 1910
- Max. length: 5,085 feet (1,550 m)
- Max. width: 3,106 feet (947 m)
- Surface area: 103.1 acres (41.7 ha)
- Average depth: 23 feet (7.0 m)
- Max. depth: 35 feet (11 m)
- Water volume: 1,960 acre-feet (2,420,000 m^{3})
- Residence time: 1.95 years
- Surface elevation: 3,904 feet (1,190 m)
- Settlements: Winchester

Winchester Lake (also known as Lapwai Lake) is a man-made body of water located on the south side of Winchester in Lewis County, Idaho. It is the central feature of Winchester Lake State Park. The lake covers 100 acres (40 ha), has an average depth of 23 feet (7.0 m), and is 35 feet (11 m) deep at its deepest point.

== History ==
The lake was created in 1910, when the Craig Mountain Lumber Company placed a dam at the headwaters of Lapwai Creek forming a mill pond that was used until the early 1960s by which time the area's marketable timber had all been felled. The lumber mill was the largest of its kind in northern Idaho, employing as many as 270 workers. The mill pond was also a source of electric power for the town. The lake was purchased from Potlatch Forests in 1966 by the Idaho Department of Fish and Game, which then turned over the lake and surrounding land to the Idaho Department of Parks and Recreation in 1969 for development of the state park.

== Fishery ==
After its acquisition by the Department of Fish and Game, the lake was drained and cleaned of logs and mill debris. It has at least once subsequently been chemically rehabilitated to remove undesirable species. Game fish found in Winchester Lake include rainbow trout, bluegill, tiger muskie, yellow perch, and largemouth bass.

== See also ==
- List of lakes in Idaho
