= Native American languages of Idaho =

The Native American languages of Idaho are the Indigenous languages traditionally associated with the Native nations whose homelands include parts of the present-day U.S. state of Idaho. Five federally recognized tribes have reservations wholly or partly within the state: the Coeur d'Alene Tribe, Kootenai Tribe of Idaho, Nez Perce Tribe, Shoshone-Bannock Tribes, and Shoshone-Paiute Tribes.

Five principal Indigenous languages are associated with these tribes. The relationship between tribes and languages is not one-to-one: the Shoshone-Bannock and Shoshone-Paiute communities maintain traditions connected with both Shoshoni and Northern Paiute or Bannock. The languages belong to several unrelated language families: Salishan, Sahaptian, and Uto-Aztecan, while Kutenai is generally classified as a language isolate.

== Distribution ==
There are five Native American languages currently spoken in Idaho. Population estimates are based on figures from Ethnologue and U.S. Census data, as given in sub-pages below. The five languages are shown in the table below:

Language	Classification	Number of Speakers	Total Ethnic Population	Tribe(s) Included	Location(s) in Idaho	Significant External Populations
Coeur d'Alene	Salishan: Interior: Southern	5	2,000	Coeur d'Alene	Coeur d'Alene Reservation	
Northern Paiute	Uto-Aztecan: Numic: Western Numic	700	5,000	Northern Paiute, Bannock	Duck Valley Indian Reservation, Fort Hall Indian Reservation	Nevada
Shoshone	Uto-Aztecan: Numic: Central Numic	2,000	12,300	Western Shoshone, Northern Shoshone	Duck Valley Indian Reservation, Fort Hall Indian Reservation	Nevada, Wyoming, Utah
Nez Perce	Plateau Penutian: Sahaptian	100	3,000	Nez Perce	Nez Perce Indian Reservation	Washington
Kootenai	Language Isolate	100	2,000	Ktunaxa: Lower Kootenay	Kootenai Indian Reservation	British Columbia, Montana, Washington

== Language revitalization ==
Idaho's tribal governments and educational programs support language teaching, documentation, and the preservation of recorded materials. A 2024 University of Idaho study found that all five of the state's federally recognized tribes were using internet-connected or mobile technologies to facilitate language classes. The study also identified the effects of the boarding-school system, social stigma, and long-term underinvestment as factors in the decline of intergenerational language transmission.

The Coeur d'Alene Tribe has developed teaching materials using the orthography devised by Lawrence Nicodemus and maintains language resources in partnership with academic institutions. After the death of the last fully fluent first-language speaker in 2018, the tribe and collaborating linguists continued to digitize recordings and develop online language resources.

The Nez Perce Tribe operates the Niimiipuu Language Program, which provides language instruction and uses an orthography selected by tribal elders. The Shoshone-Bannock Tribes provide instruction in both Shoshoni and Bannock and maintain archives of cultural and linguistic recordings.

The Shoshone-Paiute Tribes employ Shoshoni and Paiute instructors and organize adult and youth language programs through their Cultural Department. The Kootenai Tribe of Idaho is one of the communities of the wider Ktunaxa Nation, whose language programs include teaching, documentation, and collaboration with speakers and learners.

== See also ==
- Native Americans in the United States
- Indigenous peoples of the Great Basin
- Indigenous languages of the Americas
- Uto-Aztecan languages
- Kootenai language
- Salishan languages
- Plateau Penutian languages
