= Winchester Lake State Park =

State park in Idaho, United States

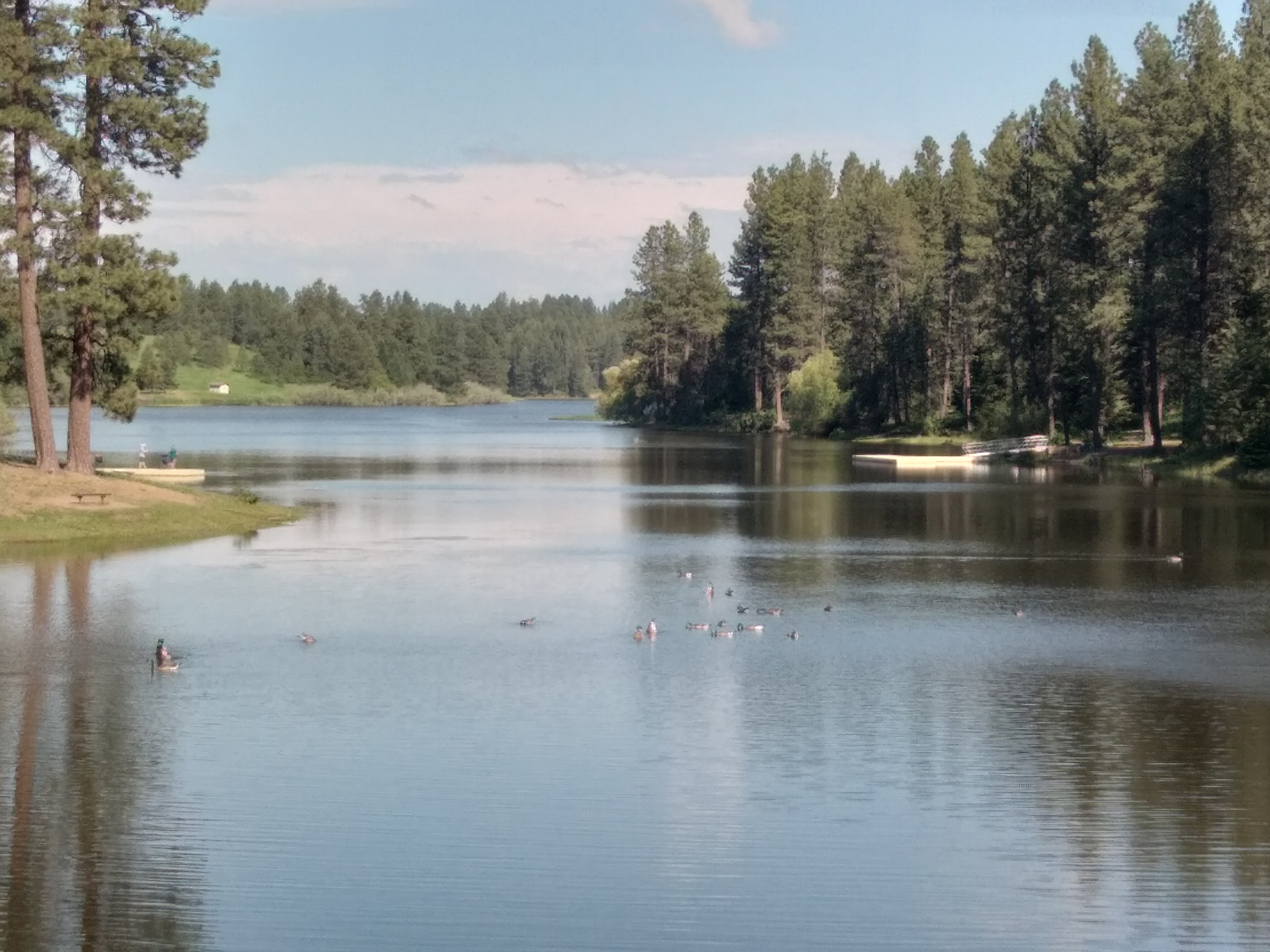

- Location within Idaho Location within the United States
- Location: Winchester, Idaho, United States
- Coordinates: 46°14′09″N 116°37′39″W
- Area: 418 acres (169 ha)
- Elevation: 3,900 ft (1,200 m)
- Established: 1969
- Administrator: Idaho Department of Parks and Recreation
- Website: Official website

Winchester Lake State Park is a public recreation area covering 418 acres (169 ha) on the southern edge of Winchester in Lewis County, Idaho, United States. The state park surrounds 104-acre (42 ha) Winchester Lake at the base of the Craig Mountains. Fish in the lake include rainbow trout, perch, bass, and bluegill. Common wildlife includes white-tailed deer, Canada geese, muskrats, bald eagles, Columbian ground squirrels, and raccoons.

== See also ==
- List of Idaho state parks
- National Parks in Idaho
