= Idaho =

U.S. state

- State
- Flag Seal
- Nicknames: The Gem State (official), The Potato State
- Motto: Esto perpetua (Latin for "Let it be perpetual")
- Anthem: "Here We Have Idaho"
- Location of Idaho within the United States
- Country: United States
- Before statehood: Oregon Territory, Washington Territory, Idaho Territory
- Admitted to the Union: July 3, 1890 (43rd)
- Capital (and largest city): Boise
- Largest county or equivalent: Ada
- Largest metro and urban areas: Boise

Government
  - Governor: Brad Little (R)
  - Lieutenant Governor: Scott Bedke (R)
- Legislature: Legislature
  - Upper house: Senate
  - Lower house: House of Representatives
- Judiciary: Idaho Supreme Court
- U.S. senators: Mike Crapo (R); Jim Risch (R)
- U.S. House delegation: 1. Russ Fulcher (R); 2. Mike Simpson (R) (list)

Area
  - Total: 83,569 sq mi (216,444 km^{2})
  - Land: 82,644 sq mi (214,046 km^{2})
  - Water: 926 sq mi (2,399 km^{2}) 1.11%
  - Rank: 14th

Dimensions
  - Length: 479 mi (771 km)
  - Width: 305 mi (491 km)
- Elevation: 4,990 ft (1,520 m)
- Highest elevation (Borah Peak (Note: Elevation adjusted to North American Vertical Datum of 1988)): 12,661 ft (3,859 m)
- Lowest elevation (Confluence of Snake and Clearwater River; Lewiston): 712 ft (217 m)

Population (2025)
  - Total: ▲2,029,733
  - Rank: 37th
  - Density: 21.6/sq mi (8.33/km^{2})
  - Rank: 44th
  - Median household income: $74,900 (2023)
  - Income rank: 24th
- Demonym: Idahoan

Language
  - Official language: English

Time zones
- primary: UTC−07:00 (MST)
  - Summer (DST): UTC−06:00 (MDT)
- Idaho Panhandle: UTC−08:00 (PST)
  - Summer (DST): UTC−07:00 (PDT)
- USPS abbreviation: ID
- ISO 3166 code: US-ID
- Latitude: 42° N to 49° N
- Longitude: 111°03′ W to 117°15′ W
- Website: idaho.gov

Idaho (/ˈaɪdəhoʊ/, EYE-də-hoe) is a landlocked state in the Pacific Northwest and Mountain West subregions of the Western United States. It borders Montana and Wyoming to the east, Nevada and Utah to the south, and Washington and Oregon to the west; the state shares a small portion of the Canada–United States border to the north with the Canadian province of British Columbia. Idaho's state capital and largest city is Boise. With an area of 83,569 square miles (216,440 km^{2}), Idaho is the 14th-largest state by land area. The state has a population of approximately two million people; it ranks as the 13th-least populous and the seventh-least densely populated of the 50 U.S. states.

For thousands of years, and prior to European colonization, Idaho had been inhabited by natives. In the early 19th century, Idaho was considered part of the Oregon Country, an area which was disputed between the U.S. and the British Empire. Idaho officially became a U.S. territory with the signing of the Oregon Treaty of 1846, but a separate Idaho Territory was not organized until 1863, instead being included for periods in Oregon Territory and Washington Territory. The state was eventually admitted to the Union on July 3, 1890, becoming the 43rd state.

Forming part of the Pacific Northwest (and the associated Cascadia bioregion), Idaho is divided into several distinct geographic and climatic regions. The state's north, the relatively isolated Idaho Panhandle, is closely linked with Eastern Washington, with which it shares the Pacific Time Zone—the rest of the state uses the Mountain Time Zone. The state's south includes the Snake River Plain (which has most of the population and agricultural land), and the southeast incorporates part of the Great Basin. Idaho is quite mountainous and contains several stretches of the Rocky Mountains. The United States Forest Service holds about 38% of Idaho's land, the highest proportion of any state.

Industries significant for the state economy include manufacturing, agriculture, mining, forestry, science and technology, and tourism. Idaho has been a predominantly Republican state since statehood, with the Republican Party dominating in both state and national elections; abortion is severely restricted and the state retains the death penalty, including methods like the firing squad. The state contains the Idaho National Laboratory. Idaho's agricultural sector supplies many products, but the state is best known for its potato crop, which comprises around one-third of the nationwide yield. Its official state nickname is the "Gem State".

== Etymology ==
In the early 1860s, when the U.S. Congress was considering organizing a new territory around Pikes Peak in the Rocky Mountains, the name "Idaho" was popular among the Congressional committee, as they believed it to be derived from a Shoshone term meaning "gem of the mountains." Realizing in January 1861 the name was quite possibly a fabrication and not Native American at all, the U.S. Congress ultimately decided to name the area Colorado Territory when it was created. But, by the time this decision was made in February 1861, the town of Idaho Springs, Colorado had already been named after their early frontrunner for a name, Idaho.

In 1863, the Territory of Idaho was formed, though "Montana" was nearly its name.

More than a decade after the name Idaho was first discussed for the eventual Colorado Territory, George M. Willing, a politician, claimed that he had been inspired by a little girl named Ida and that he coined the name in Washington at the time of the Congressional committee when he had been posing as an elected delegate to Congress.

The same year Congress created Colorado Territory, a county called Idaho County was created in eastern Washington Territory. The county was named after a steamship named Idaho, which was launched on the Columbia River in 1860. It is unclear whether the steamship was named before or after the legitimacy of the Native American origins of "Idaho" came into question. Regardless, part of Washington Territory, including Idaho County, was used to create Idaho Territory in 1863. Idaho Territory would later change its boundaries to the area that became the U.S. state.

== History ==
Humans may have been present in the Idaho area as long as 14,500 years ago. Excavations at Wilson Butte Cave near Twin Falls in 1959 revealed evidence of human activity, including arrowheads, that rank among the oldest dated artifacts in North America. American Indian peoples predominant in the area included the Nez Percé in the north and the Northern and Western Shoshone in the south.

A Late Upper Paleolithic site was identified at Cooper's Ferry in western Idaho near the town of Cottonwood by archaeologists in 2019. Based on evidence found at the site, first people lived in this area 15,300 to 16,600 years ago, predating the Beringia land bridge by about a thousand years. The discoverers emphasized that they possess similarities with tools and artifacts discovered in Japan that date from 13,000 to 16,000 years ago. The discovery also showed that the first people might not have come to North America by land, as previously theorized. On the contrary, they probably came by sea, using a Pacific coastal route.

The most parsimonious explanation we think is that people came down the Pacific Coast, and as they encountered the mouth of the Columbia River, they essentially found an off-ramp from this coastal migration and also found their first viable interior route to the areas that are south of the ice sheet.

An early presence of French-Canadian trappers is visible in names and toponyms: Nez Percé, Cœur d'Alène, Boisé, Payette. Some of these names appeared prior to the Lewis and Clark and Astorian expeditions, which included significant numbers of French and Métis guides recruited for their familiarity with the terrain.

The Lewis and Clark expedition crossed Idaho in 1805 on the way to the Pacific, and in 1806, on the return trip, largely following the Clearwater River in both directions, making it one the last states settled by European Americans. The first non-indigenous settlement was Kullyspell House, established on the shore of Lake Pend Oreille in 1809 by David Thompson of the North West Company for fur trading. In 1812 Donald Mackenzie, working for the Pacific Fur Company at the time, established a post on the lower Clearwater River near present-day Lewiston. This post, known as "MacKenzie's Post" or "Clearwater", operated until the Pacific Fur Company was bought out by the North West Company in 1813, after which the post was abandoned. The first organized non-indigenous communities within the present borders of Idaho were established by Mormon pioneers in 1860. The first permanent, substantial incorporated community was Lewiston, in 1861. Early in its history, Idaho saw a large influx of Chinese immigrants, who by 1870 made up about 28.5% of the territory's population.

Idaho, as part of the Oregon Country, was claimed by both the United States and Great Britain until the United States gained undisputed jurisdiction in 1846. From 1843 to 1859, present-day Idaho was under the de facto jurisdiction of the Provisional Government of Oregon. When Oregon became a state in 1859, what is now Idaho was situated in what remained of the original Oregon Territory, designated as the Washington Territory. Between 1849 and the creation of the Idaho Territory in 1863, parts of present-day Idaho were included in the Oregon, Washington, and Dakota Territories. The new Idaho territory included present-day Idaho, Montana, and most of Wyoming.

Idaho achieved statehood in 1890, following a difficult start as a territory, including the transfer of the territorial capital from Lewiston to Boise, disenfranchisement of Mormon polygamists upheld by the U.S. Supreme Court in 1890, and a federal attempt to split the territory between Washington Territory, which gained statehood in 1889, a year before Idaho, and the state of Nevada which had been a state since 1864.

Idaho was one of the hardest hit of the Pacific Northwest states during the Great Depression. Prices plummeted for Idaho's major crops: in 1932 a bushel of potatoes brought only ten cents compared to $1.51 in 1919, while Idaho farmers saw their annual income of $685 in 1929 drop to $250 by 1932.

Between 1991 and 2002, Idaho expanded its commercial base to include the science and technology sector which accounted for over 25% of its gross state product in 2001.

During the COVID-19 pandemic, Idaho enacted statewide crisis standards of care as COVID-19 patients overwhelmed hospitals. The state had one of the lowest vaccination rates in the country as of mid-October 2021.

== Geography ==
Idaho shares a border with six U.S. states and one Canadian province. The states of Washington and Oregon are to the west, Nevada and Utah to the south, and Montana and Wyoming to the east. Idaho also shares a short border with the Canadian province of British Columbia to the north.

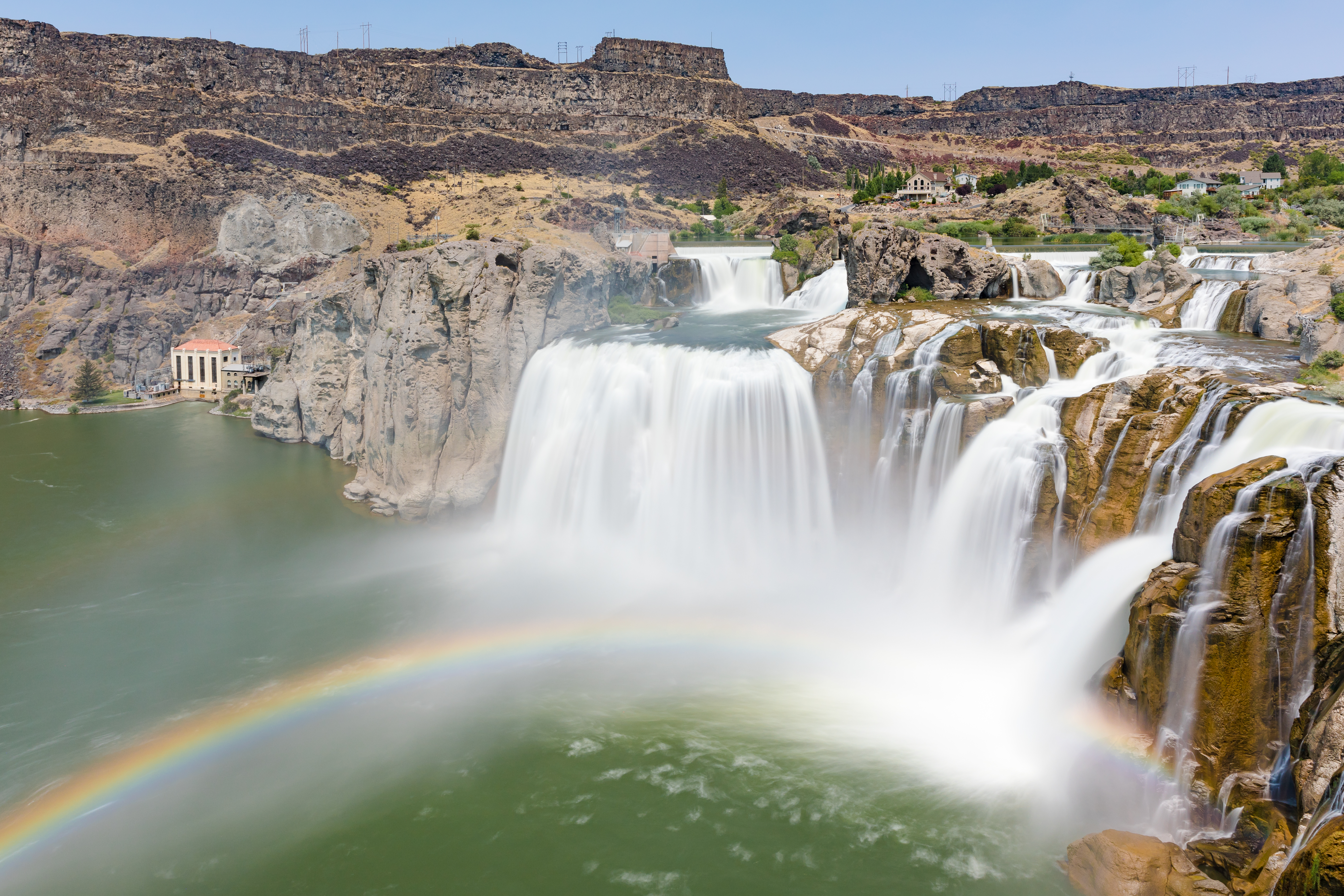
Shoshone Falls

The landscape is rugged, with some of the largest unspoiled natural areas in the United States. For example, at 2.3 million acres (930,000 ha), the Frank Church–River of No Return Wilderness is the largest contiguous area of protected wilderness in the continental United States. Idaho is a Rocky Mountain state with abundant natural resources and scenic areas. The state has snow-capped mountain ranges, rapids, vast lakes and steep canyons. The waters of the Snake River run through Hells Canyon, the deepest gorge in the United States. Shoshone Falls falls down cliffs from a height greater than that of Niagara Falls.

By far, the most important river in Idaho is the Snake River, a major tributary of the Columbia River. The Snake River flows from Yellowstone in northwestern Wyoming through the Snake River Plain in southern Idaho before turning north, leaving the state at Lewiston before joining the Columbia in Kennewick. Other major rivers are the Clark Fork/Pend Oreille River, the Spokane River, and many major tributaries of the Snake River, including the Clearwater River, the Salmon River, the Boise River, and the Payette River. The Salmon River empties into the Snake in Hells Canyon. The Port of Lewiston, at the confluence of the Clearwater and the Snake Rivers, is the farthest inland seaport on the West Coast at 465 river miles from the Pacific at Astoria, Oregon.

The vast majority of Idaho's population lives in the Snake River Plain, a valley running from across the entirety of southern Idaho from east to west. The valley contains the major cities of Boise, Meridian, Nampa, Caldwell, Twin Falls, Idaho Falls, and Pocatello. The plain served as an easy pass through the Rocky Mountains for westward-bound settlers on the Oregon Trail, and many settlers chose to settle the area rather than risking the treacherous route through the Blue Mountains and the Cascade Range to the west. The western region of the plain is known as the Treasure Valley, bound between the Owyhee Mountains to the southwest and the Boise Mountains to the northeast. The central region of the Snake River Plain is known as the Magic Valley.

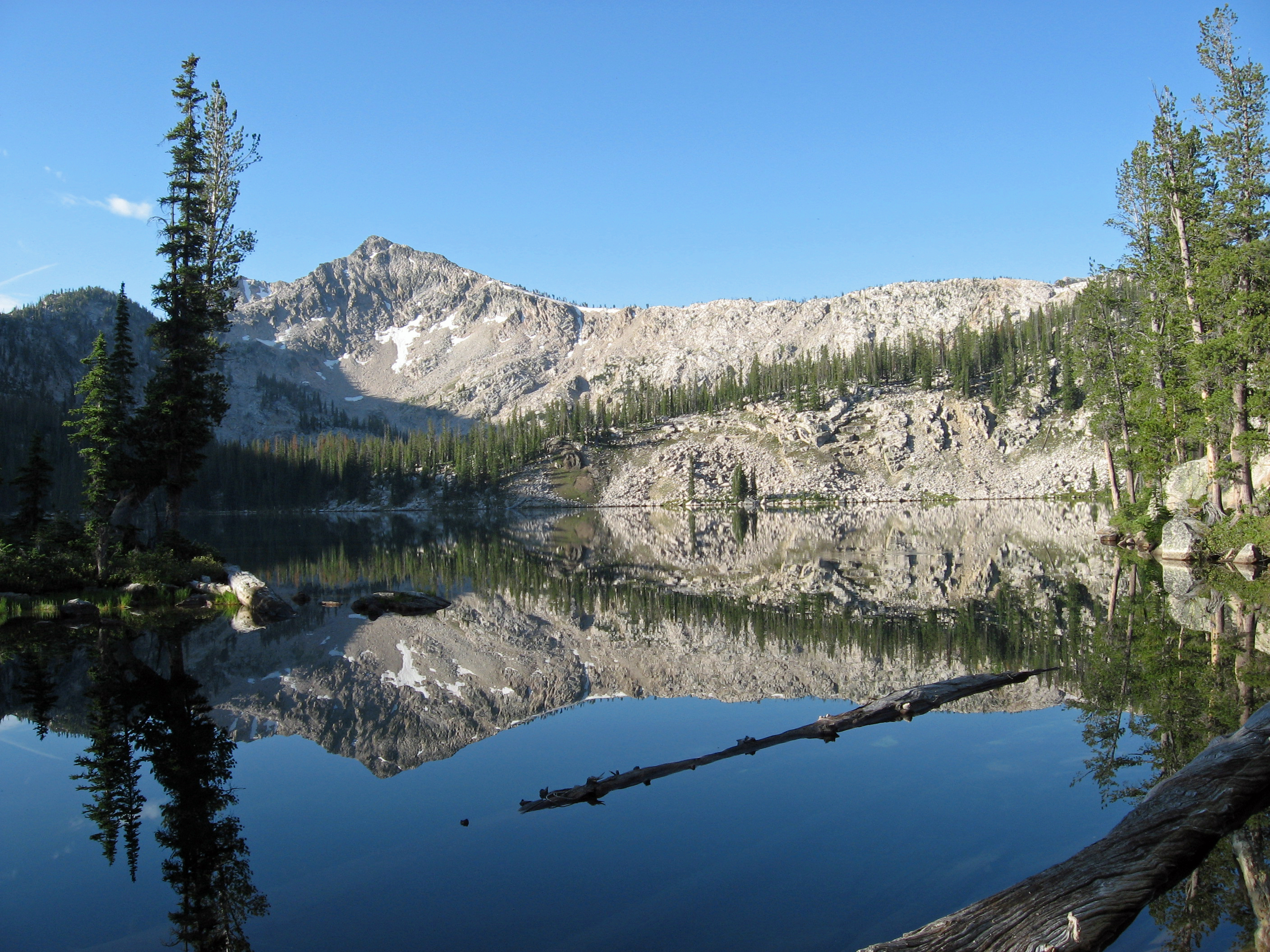
Edna Lake, Sawtooth Mountains

Idaho's highest point is Borah Peak, 12,662 ft (3,859 m), in the Lost River Range north of Mackay. Idaho's lowest point, 710 ft (216 m), is in Lewiston, where the Clearwater River joins the Snake River and continues into Washington. The Sawtooth Range is often considered Idaho's most famous mountain range. Other mountain ranges in Idaho include the Bitterroot Range, the White Cloud Mountains, the Lost River Range, the Clearwater Mountains, and the Salmon River Mountains.

Salmon-Challis National Forest is located in the east central sections of the state, with Salmon National Forest to the north and Challis National Forest to the south. The forest is in an area known as the Idaho Cobalt Belt, which consists of a 34-mile (55 km) long geological formation of sedimentary rock that contains some of the largest cobalt deposits in the U.S.

Idaho has two time zones, with the dividing line approximately midway between Canada and Nevada. Southern Idaho, including the Boise metropolitan area, Idaho Falls, Pocatello, and Twin Falls, are in the Mountain Time Zone. A legislative error (15 U.S.C. ch. 6 §264) theoretically placed this region in the Central Time Zone, but this was corrected with a 2007 amendment. Areas north of the Salmon River, including Coeur d'Alene, Moscow, Lewiston, and Sandpoint, are in the Pacific Time Zone, which contains less than a quarter of the state's population and land area.

=== Climate ===
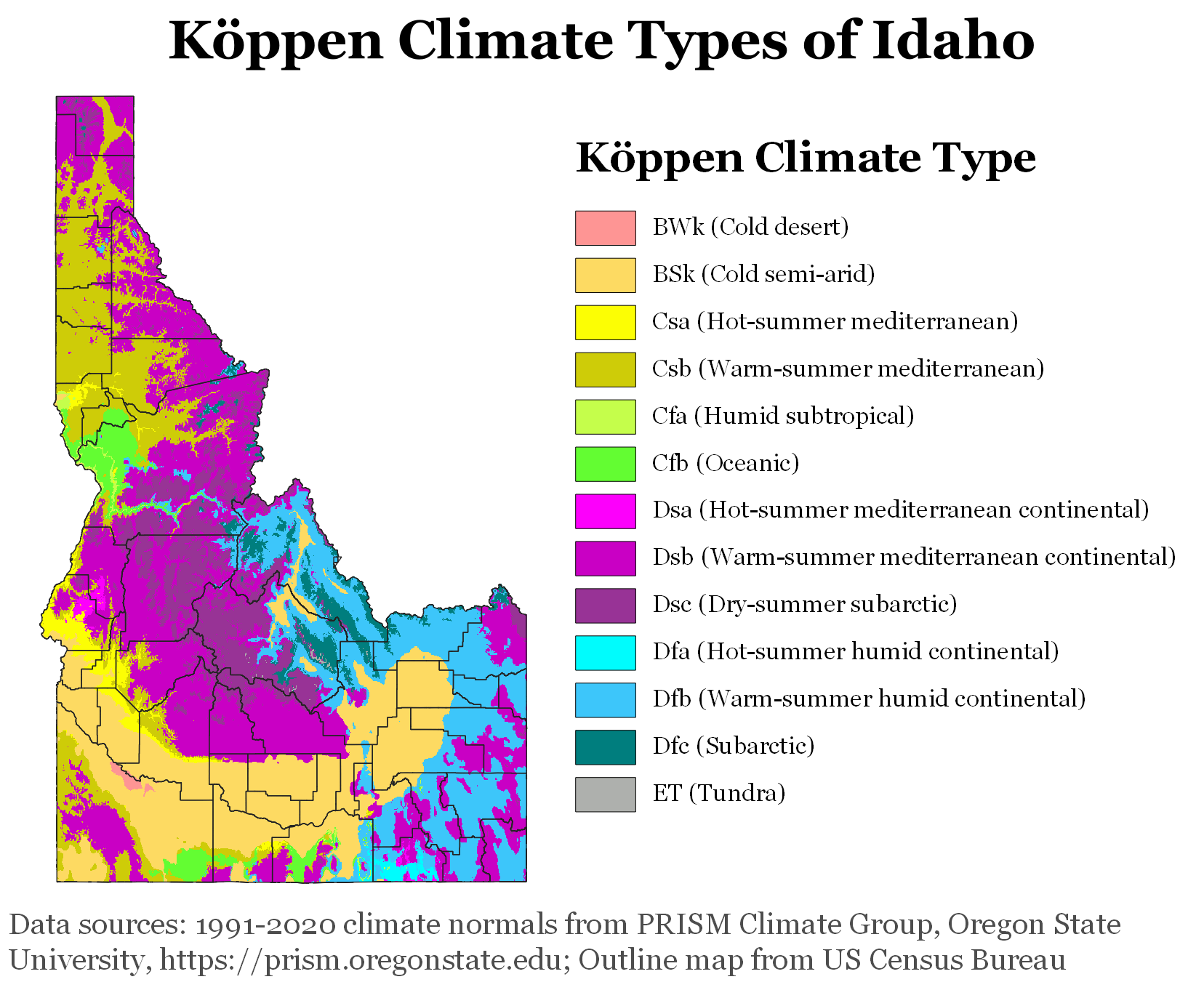
Köppen climate types of Idaho, using 1991–2020 climate normals

Idaho's climate varies widely. Although the state's western border is about 330 miles (530 km) from the Pacific Ocean, the maritime influence is still felt in Idaho; especially, in the winter when cloud cover, humidity, and precipitation are at their maximum extent. This influence has a moderating effect in the winter where temperatures are not as low as would otherwise be expected for a northern state with predominantly high elevations. In the panhandle, moist air masses from the coast are released as precipitation over the North Central Rockies forests, creating the North American inland temperate rainforest. The maritime influence is least prominent in the state's eastern part where the precipitation patterns are often reversed, with wetter summers and drier winters, and seasonal temperature differences are more extreme, showing a more semi-arid continental climate.

Idaho can be hot, although extended periods over 98 °F (37 °C) are rare, except for the lowest point in elevation, Lewiston, which correspondingly sees little snow. Hot summer days are tempered by the low relative humidity and cooler evenings during summer months since, for most of the state, the highest diurnal difference in temperature is often in the summer. Winters can be cold, although extended periods of bitter cold weather below zero are unusual. Idaho's all-time highest temperature of 118 °F (48 °C) was recorded at Orofino on July 28, 1934; the all-time lowest temperature of −60 °F (−51 °C) was recorded at Island Park Dam on January 18, 1943.

Monthly normal high and low temperatures for various Idaho cities. (°F)
City	Jan	Feb	Mar	Apr	May	Jun	Jul	Aug	Sep	Oct	Nov	Dec
Boise	38/24	45/27	55/33	62/38	72/46	81/53	91/59	90/59	79/50	65/40	48/31	38/23
Lewiston	42/30	47/32	55/36	62/41	72/48	79/54	91/61	90/60	80/52	63/42	49/35	41/30
Pocatello	33/16	38/19	49/27	59/33	68/40	78/46	88/52	88/51	76/42	62/33	45/24	33/16
Orofino	38/25	46/28	55/32	64/38	72/44	80/50	89/54	90/53	79/45	63/36	46/31	37/26

=== Lakes and rivers ===
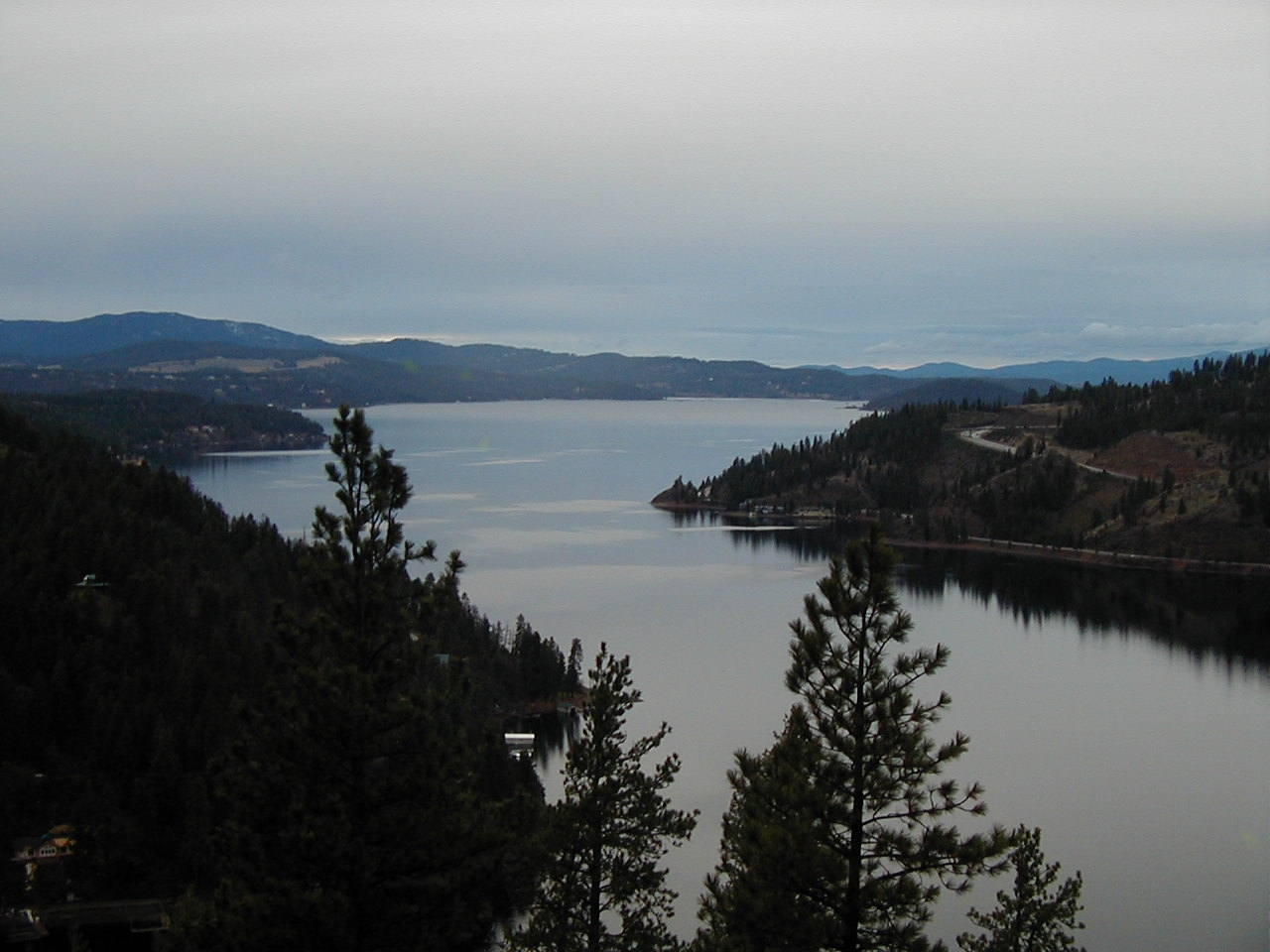
Lake Coeur d'Alene in North Idaho

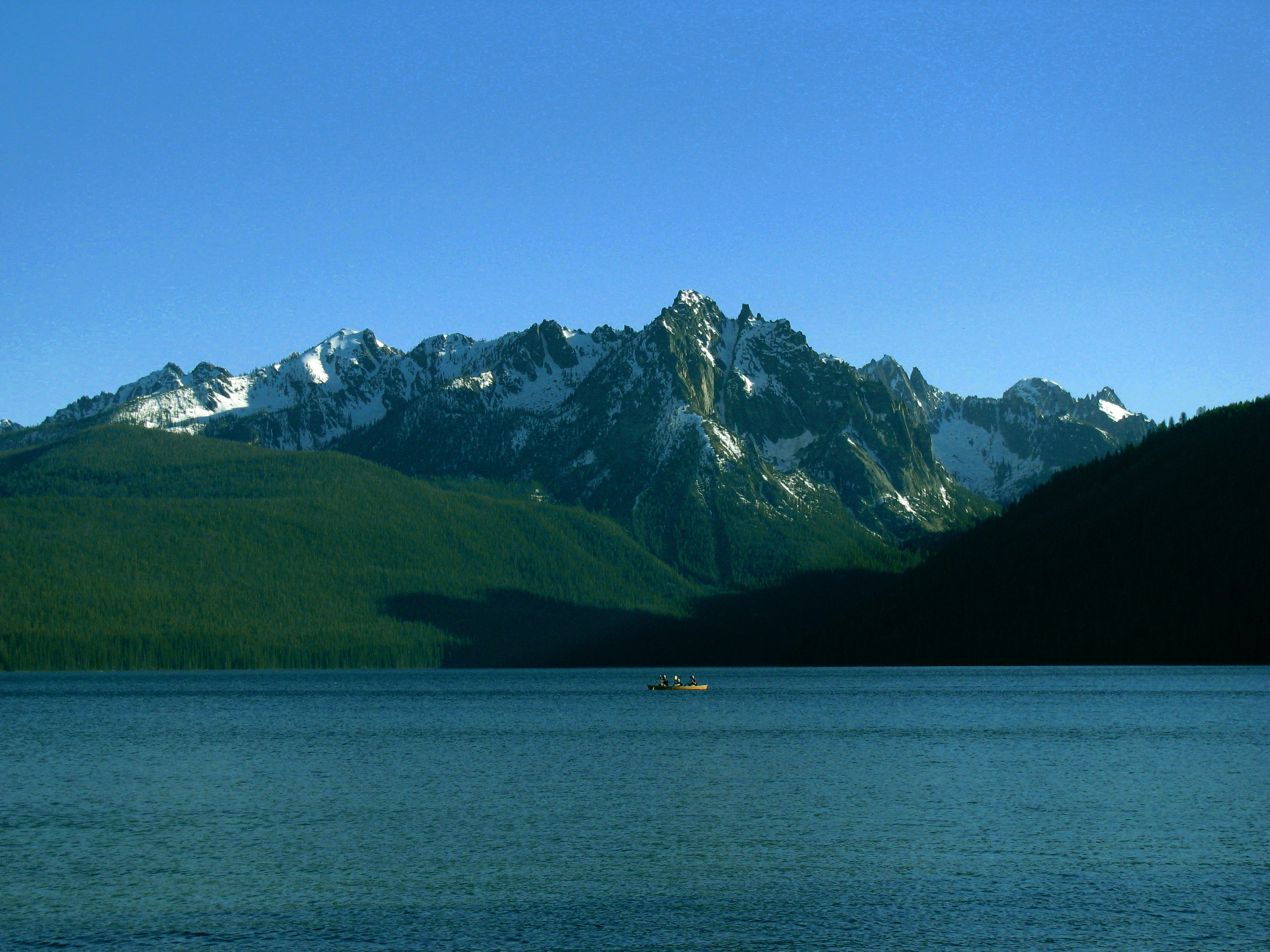
Redfish Lake in central Idaho

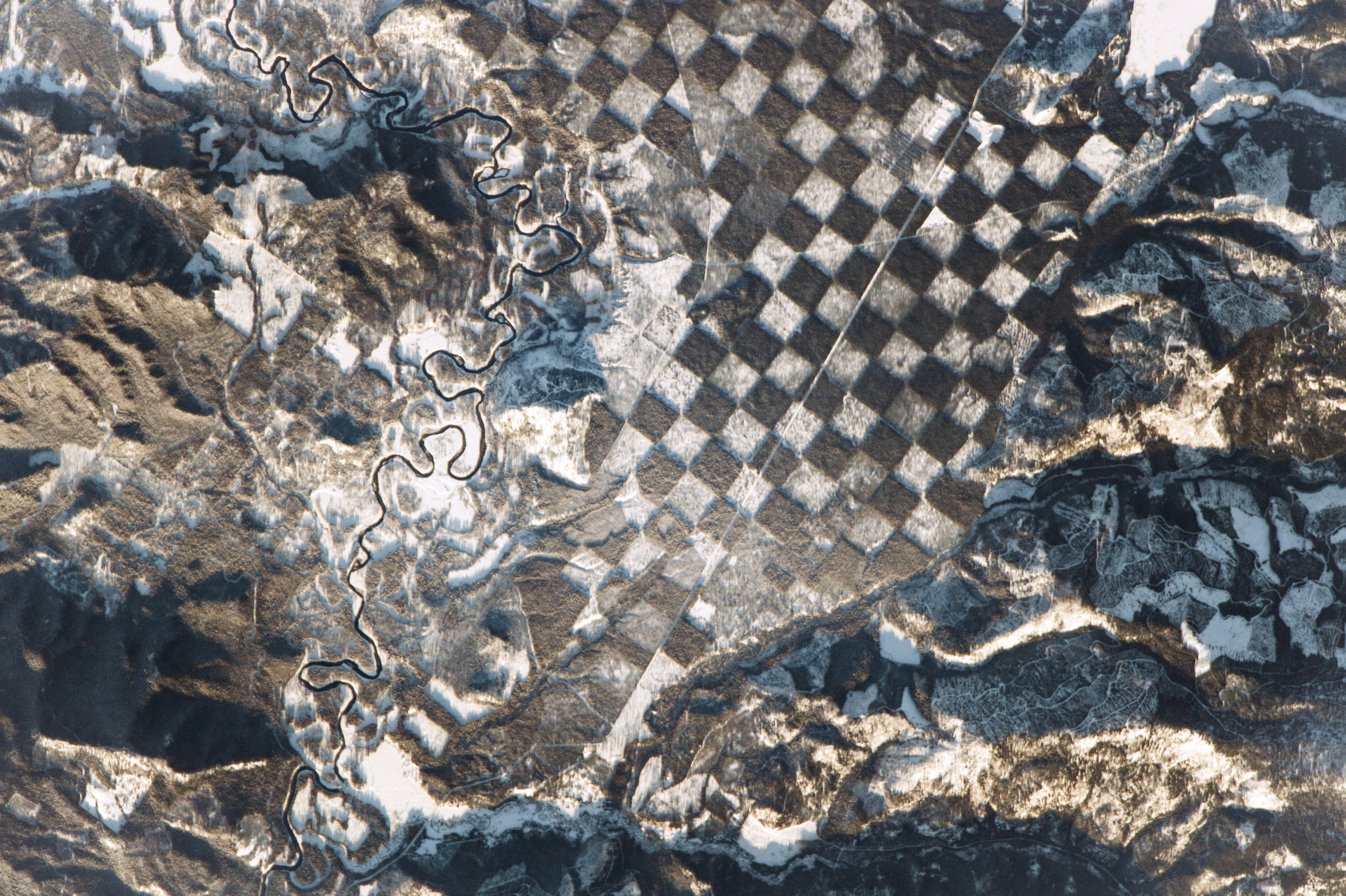
Priest River winding through Whitetail Butte

- Clark Fork River
- Alturas Lake
- Bear River
- Bear Lake (Idaho–Utah)
- Boise River
- Clearwater River
- Hayden Lake
- Henry's Lake
- Kootenai River
- Lake Cascade
- Lake Cleveland
- Lake Coeur d'Alene
- Lake Lowell
- Lake Walcott
- Pend Oreille - Largest in Idaho
- Little Redfish Lake
- Lucky Peak Lake
- Moyie River
- North Fork Clearwater River
- Pack River
- Payette Lake, (McCall)
- Pettit Lake
- Priest Lake
- Perkins Lake
- Portneuf River
- Redfish Lake
- Salmon River
- Sawtooth Lake
- Snake River - Longest
- Stanley Lake
- St. Joe River
- Warm Lake

=== Protected areas ===
As of 2018:

==== National parks, reserves, monuments and historic sites ====
- Salmon-Challis National Forest
- California National Historic Trail
- City of Rocks National Reserve
- Craters of the Moon National Monument and Preserve
- Hagerman Fossil Beds National Monument
- Lewis and Clark National Historic Trail
- Minidoka National Historic Site
- Nez Perce National Historical Park
- Oregon National Historic Trail
- Yellowstone National Park
- Pacific Northwest National Scenic Trail

==== National recreation areas ====
- Hells Canyon National Recreation Area
- Sawtooth National Recreation Area

==== National wildlife refuges and Wilderness Areas ====
- Bear Lake National Wildlife Refuge
- Camas National Wildlife Refuge
- Deer Flat National Wildlife Refuge
- Frank Church—River of No Return Wilderness Area
- Grays Lake National Wildlife Refuge
- Kootenai National Wildlife Refuge
- Minidoka National Wildlife Refuge

==== National conservation areas ====
- Snake River Birds of Prey National Conservation Area

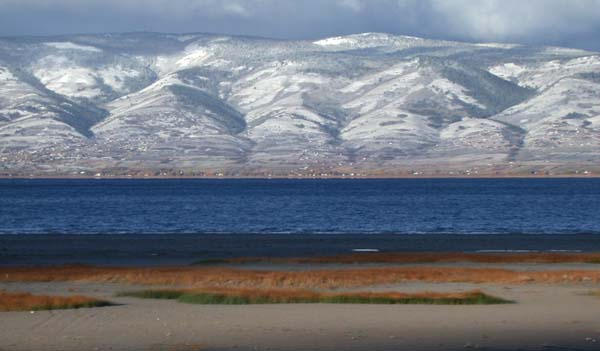
Bear Lake viewed from Bear Lake State Park

==== State parks ====
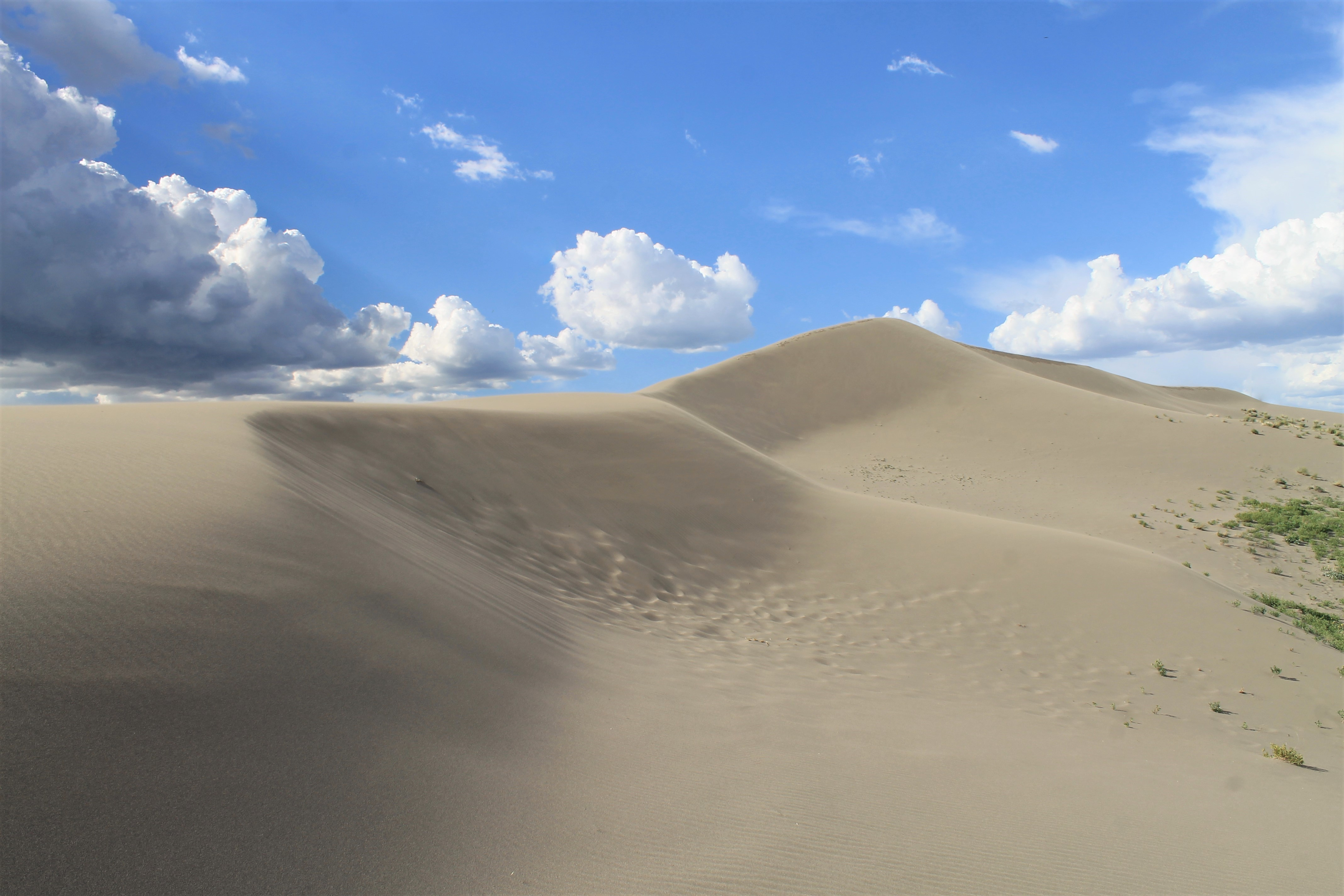
Bruneau Dunes State Park

- Bear Lake State Park
- Bruneau Dunes State Park
- Castle Rocks State Park
- City of Rocks National Reserve
- Coeur d'Alene Parkway State Park
- Dworshak State Park
- Eagle Island State Park
- Farragut State Park
- Harriman State Park
- Hells Gate State Park
- Henrys Lake State Park
- Heyburn State Park
- Lake Cascade State Park
- Lake Walcott State Park
- Land of the Yankee Fork State Park
- Lucky Peak State Park
- Massacre Rocks State Park
- McCroskey State Park
- Old Mission State Park
- Ponderosa State Park
- Priest Lake State Park
- Round Lake State Park
- Thousand Springs State Park
- Three Island Crossing State Park
- Trail of the Coeur d'Alenes
- Winchester Lake State Park

== Demographics ==
=== Population ===
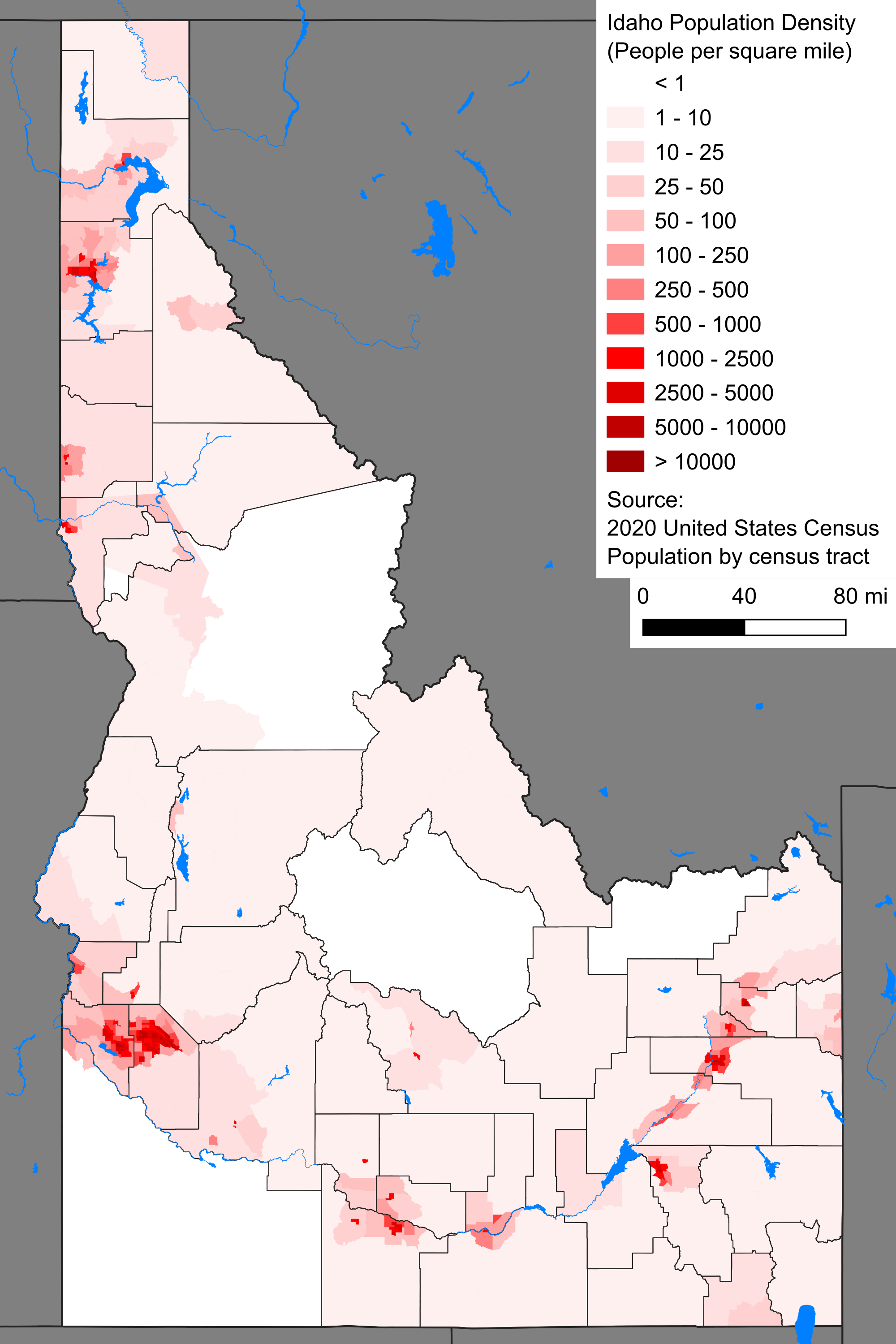
Idaho population density map

Historical population
Census	Pop.	Note	%±
1870	14,999		—
1880	32,610		117.4%
1890	88,548		171.5%
1900	161,772		82.7%
1910	325,594		101.3%
1920	431,866		32.6%
1930	445,032		3.0%
1940	524,873		17.9%
1950	588,637		12.1%
1960	667,191		13.3%
1970	712,567		6.8%
1980	943,935		32.5%
1990	1,006,749		6.7%
2000	1,293,953		28.5%
2010	1,567,582		21.1%
2020	1,839,106		17.3%
2025 (est.)	2,029,733		10.4%
Source: 1910–2020; 2024

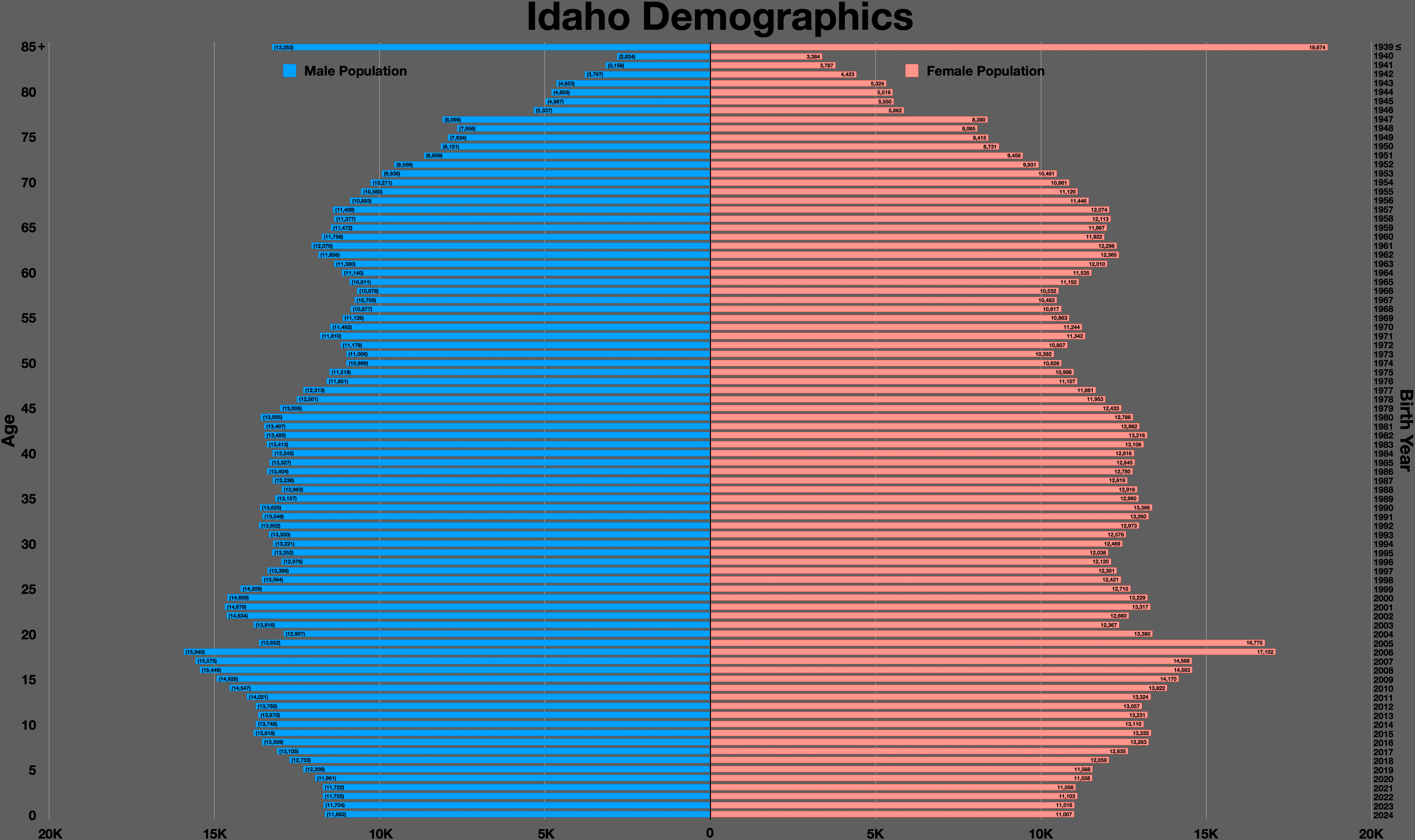
Idaho population pyramid for the period 2020-2025

The United States Census Bureau determined Idaho's population was 1,900,923 on July 1, 2021, a 21% increase since the 2010 US census.

Idaho had an estimated population of 1,754,208 in 2018, an increase of 37,265 from the prior year and an increase of 186,626 (11.91%) since 2010. This included a natural increase since the last census of 58,884 (111,131 births minus 52,247 deaths) and an increase due to net migration of 75,795 people into the state. There are large numbers of Americans of English and German ancestry in Idaho. Immigration from outside the United States resulted in a net increase of 14,522 people, and migration within the country produced a net increase of 61,273 people.

According to the American Immigration Council, in 2018, the top countries of origin for Idaho's immigrants were Mexico, Canada, the Philippines, China, and Germany.

Idaho's population increased by 17.3% from 2010 to 2020, the second fastest rate of growth of any state that decade.

Nampa, about 20 miles (30 km) west of downtown Boise, became the state's second-largest city in the late 1990s, passing Pocatello and Idaho Falls. Nampa's population was under 29,000 in 1990 and grew to over 81,000 by 2010. Located between Nampa and Boise, Meridian also experienced high growth, from fewer than 10,000 residents in 1990 to more than 75,000 in 2010, and is now Idaho's third-largest city. Growth of 5% or more over the same period has also been observed in Caldwell, Coeur d'Alene, Post Falls, and Twin Falls.

From 1990 to 2010, Idaho's population increased by over 560,000 (55%). The Boise metropolitan area (officially known as the Boise City-Nampa, ID, Metropolitan Statistical Area) is Idaho's largest. Other metropolitan areas, in order of size, are Coeur d'Alene, Idaho Falls, Pocatello and Lewiston.

According to HUD's 2022 Annual Homeless Assessment Report to Congress, there were an estimated 1,998 homeless people in Idaho.

=== Racial and ethnic composition ===
Idaho – Racial and ethnic composition Note: the US Census treats Hispanic/Latino as an ethnic category. This table excludes Latinos from the racial categories and assigns them to a separate category. Hispanics/Latinos may be of any race.
Race / Ethnicity (NH = Non-Hispanic)	Pop 1980	Pop 1990	Pop 2000	Pop 2010	Pop 2020	% 1980	% 1990	% 2000	% 2010	% 2020
White alone (NH)	886,185	928,661	1,139,291	1,316,243	1,450,523	93.88%	92.24%	88.05%	83.97%	78.87%
Black or African American alone (NH)	2,667	3,211	4,889	8,875	14,785	0.28%	0.32%	0.38%	0.57%	0.80%
Native American or Alaska Native alone (NH)	10,521	12,418	15,789	17,556	18,903	1.11%	1.23%	1.22%	1.12%	1.03%
Asian alone (NH)	5,852	9,053	11,641	18,529	26,036	0.62%	0.90%	0.90%	1.18%	1.42%
Native Hawaiian or Pacific Islander alone (NH)	x	x	1,200	2,153	3,401	x	x	0.09%	0.14%	0.18%
Other race alone (NH)	2,095	479	1,192	1,539	8,243	0.22%	0.05%	0.09%	0.10%	0.45%
Mixed race or Multiracial (NH)	x	x	18,261	26,786	77,808	x	x	1.41%	1.71%	4.23%
Hispanic or Latino (any race)	36,615	52,927	101,690	175,901	239,407	3.88%	5.26%	7.86%	11.22%	13.02%
Total	943,935	1,006,749	1,293,953	1,567,582	1,839,106	100.00%	100.00%	100.00%	100.00%	100.00%

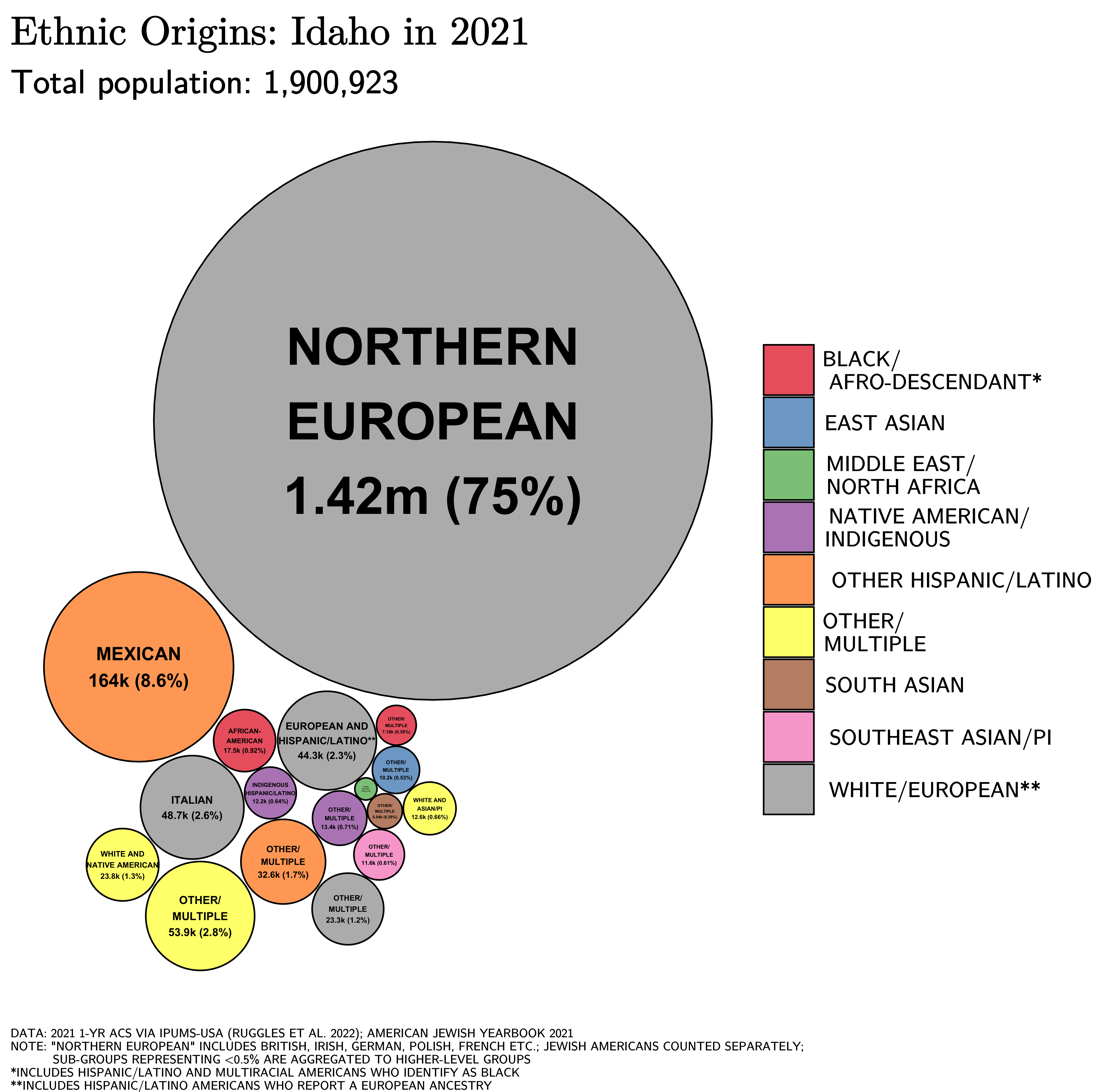
Ethnic origins in Idaho

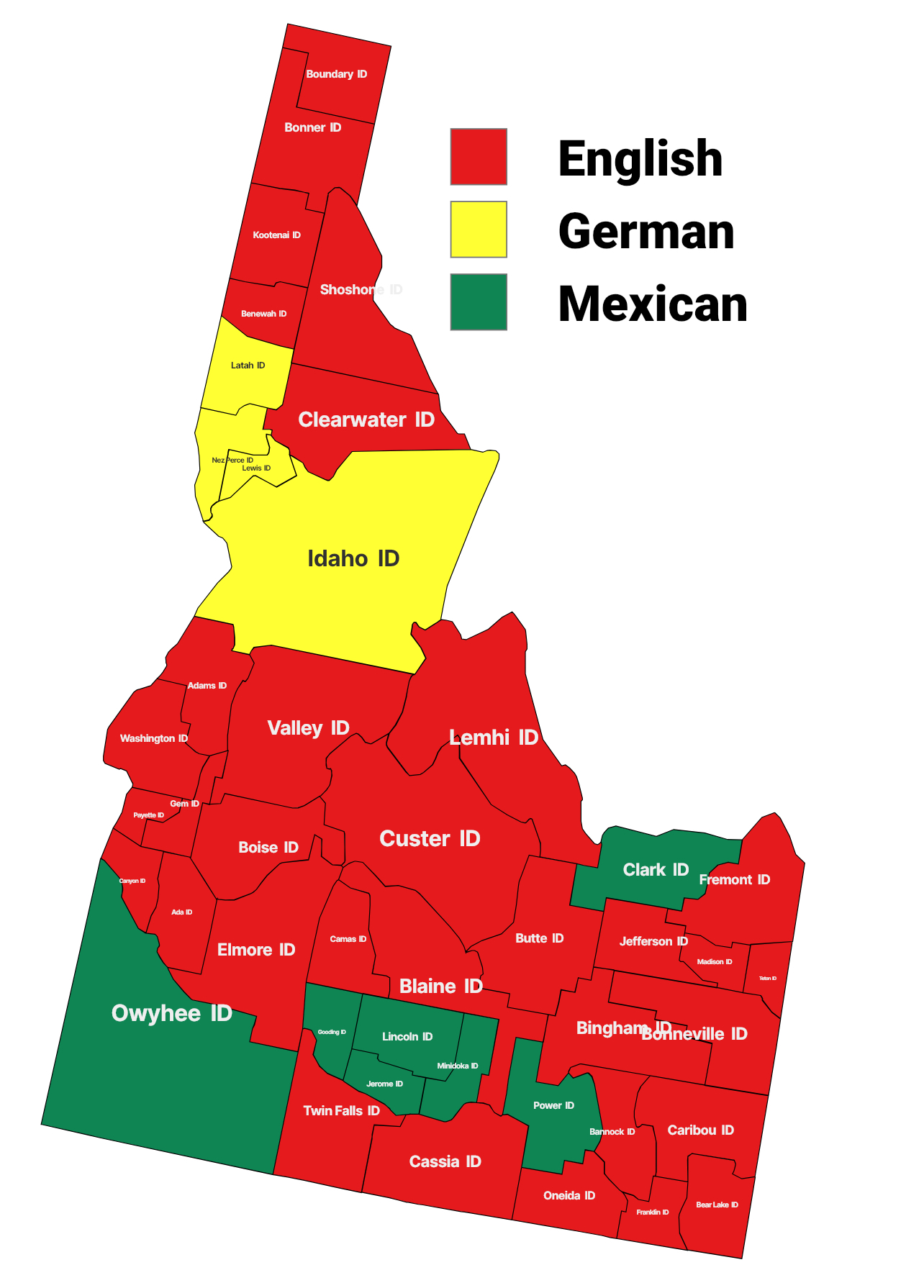
Largest alone or in any combination ethnic origin by county in Idaho, per the 2020 census

Idaho historical racial composition
Racial composition	1970	1990	2000	2010	2020
White or European American	98.1%	94.4%	90.1%	89.1%	82.1%
Indigenous	0.9%	1.4%	1.4%	1.4%	1.4%
Asian	0.5%	0.9%	0.9%	1.2%	1.5%
Black	0.3%	0.3%	0.4%	0.6%	0.9%
Native Hawaiian and other Pacific Islander	—	—	0.1%	0.1%	0.2%
Other race	0.2%	3.0%	4.2%	5.1%	5.6%
Two or more races	—	—	2.0%	2.5%	8.3%

According to the 2017 American Community Survey, 12.2% of Idaho's population was of Hispanic or Latino origin of any race: Mexican (10.6%), Puerto Rican (0.2%), Cuban (0.1%), and other Hispanic or Latino origin (1.3%). The five largest ancestry groups were: German (17.5%), English (16.4%), Irish (9.3%), American (8.1%), and Scottish (3.2%).

The majority of Idaho's population is of European descent. Most of Idaho's white residents trace their ancestry to the United Kingdom, Germany, Ireland, France, Italy, or Poland. There are also small numbers of Native Americans, Asians, and African Americans in the state.

In 2018, the top countries of origin for Idaho's immigrants were Mexico, Canada, the Philippines, China, and Germany.

=== Native American tribes ===
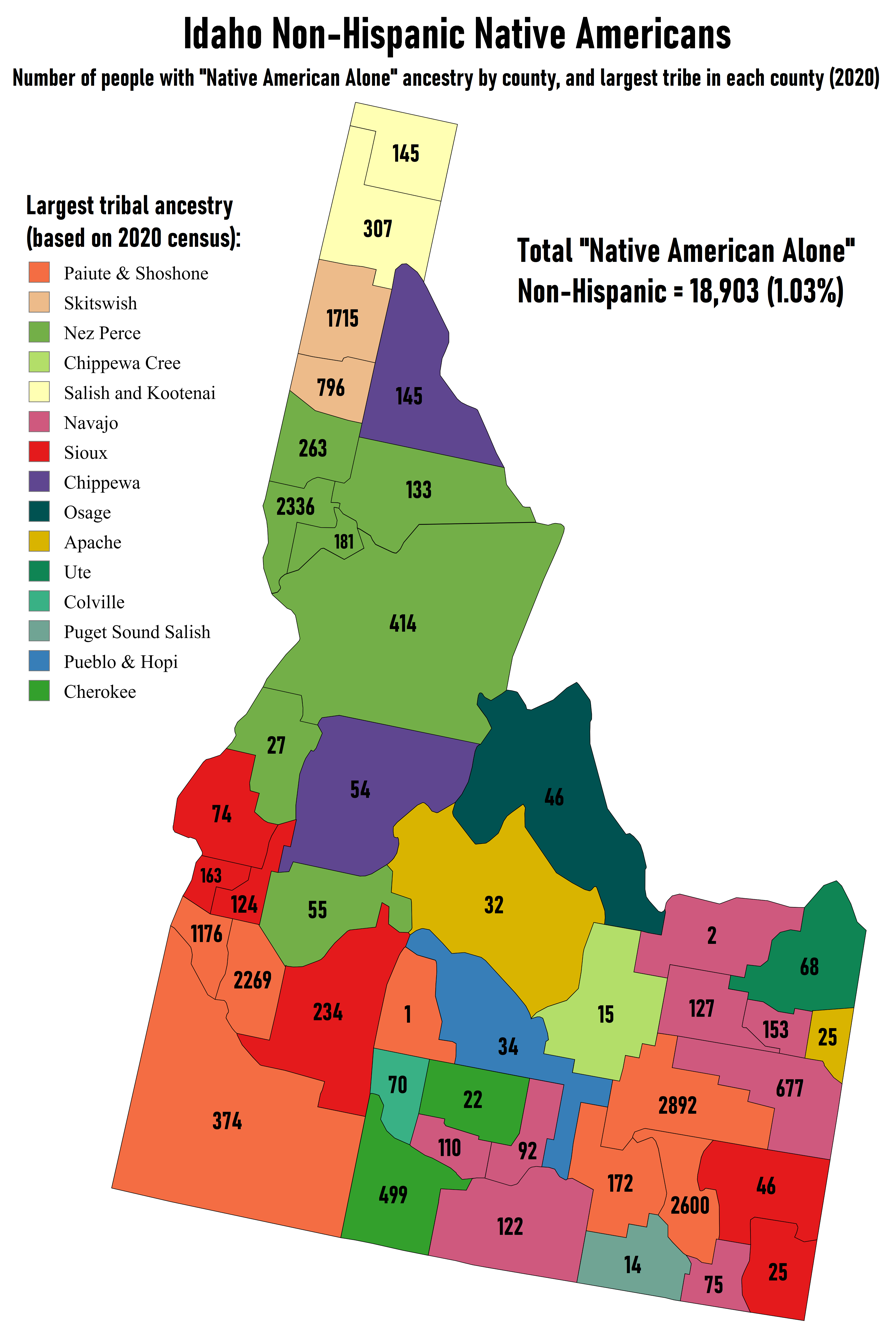
Largest Non-Hispanic Native American ancestry by county and numbers of people reporting "Native American Alone"

Historically Idaho has been inhabited by several Native American tribes, namely the Nez Perce, the Skitswish (Coeur d'Alene), the Kootenai, northern Paiute (especially their major subdivision known as the Bannock), western and northern Shoshone, the Salish (Flathead), the Palouse and the Kalispel. Nowadays there are five federally recognized Native American tribes in the state. These tribes include the Shoshone-Bannock, the Shoshone-Paiute, the Coeur d'Alene, the Kootenai, and the Nez Perce.

==== Births ====
Map of counties in Idaho by racial plurality, per the 2020 census Legend: Non-Hispanic White 50–60% 60–70% 70–80% 80–90% 90%+

Note: Births in the table do not add up because Hispanics are counted both by their ethnicity and by their race, giving a higher overall number.

Live Births by Single Race/Ethnicity of Mother
Race	2014	2015	2016	2017	2018	2019	2020	2021	2022	2023	2024
White	18,188 (79.5%)	18,087 (79.2%)	17,543 (78.0%)	17,151 (77.3%)	16,574 (77.4%)	16,959 (76.9%)	16,463 (76.4%)	17,039 (76.0%)	16,894 (75.4%)	16,649 (74.3%)	17,215 (74.0%)
Asian	501 (2.2%)	516 (2.3%)	363 (1.6%)	366 (1.7%)	348 (1.6%)	350 (1.6%)	327 (1.5%)	380 (1.7%)	378 (1.7%)	398 (1.8%)	408 (1.7%)
Black	250 (1.1%)	287 (1.2%)	217 (1.0%)	243 (1.1%)	233 (1.1%)	261 (1.2%)	265 (1.2%)	271 (1.2%)	258 (1.2%)	291 (1.3%)	319 (1.4%)
American Indian	429 (1.9%)	406 (1.8%)	261 (1.2%)	337 (1.5%)	285 (1.3%)	291 (1.3%)	206 (0.9%)	232 (1.0%)	194 (0.9%)	174 (0.8%)	207 (0.9%)
Hispanic (any race)	3,651 (16.0%)	3,645 (16.0%)	3,614 (16.1%)	3,598 (16.2%)	3,549 (16.6%)	3,702 (16.8%)	3,687 (17.1%)	3,887 (17.3%)	4,002 (17.9%)	4,265 (19.0%)	4,427 (19.0%)
Total	22,876 (100%)	22,827 (100%)	22,482 (100%)	22,181 (100%)	21,403 (100%)	22,063 (100%)	21,533 (100%)	22,427 (100%)	22,391 (100%)	22,397 (100%)	23,276 (100%)

- Since 2016, data for births of White Hispanic origin have not been collected but are included in one Hispanic group; persons of Hispanic origin may be of any race.

=== Religion ===
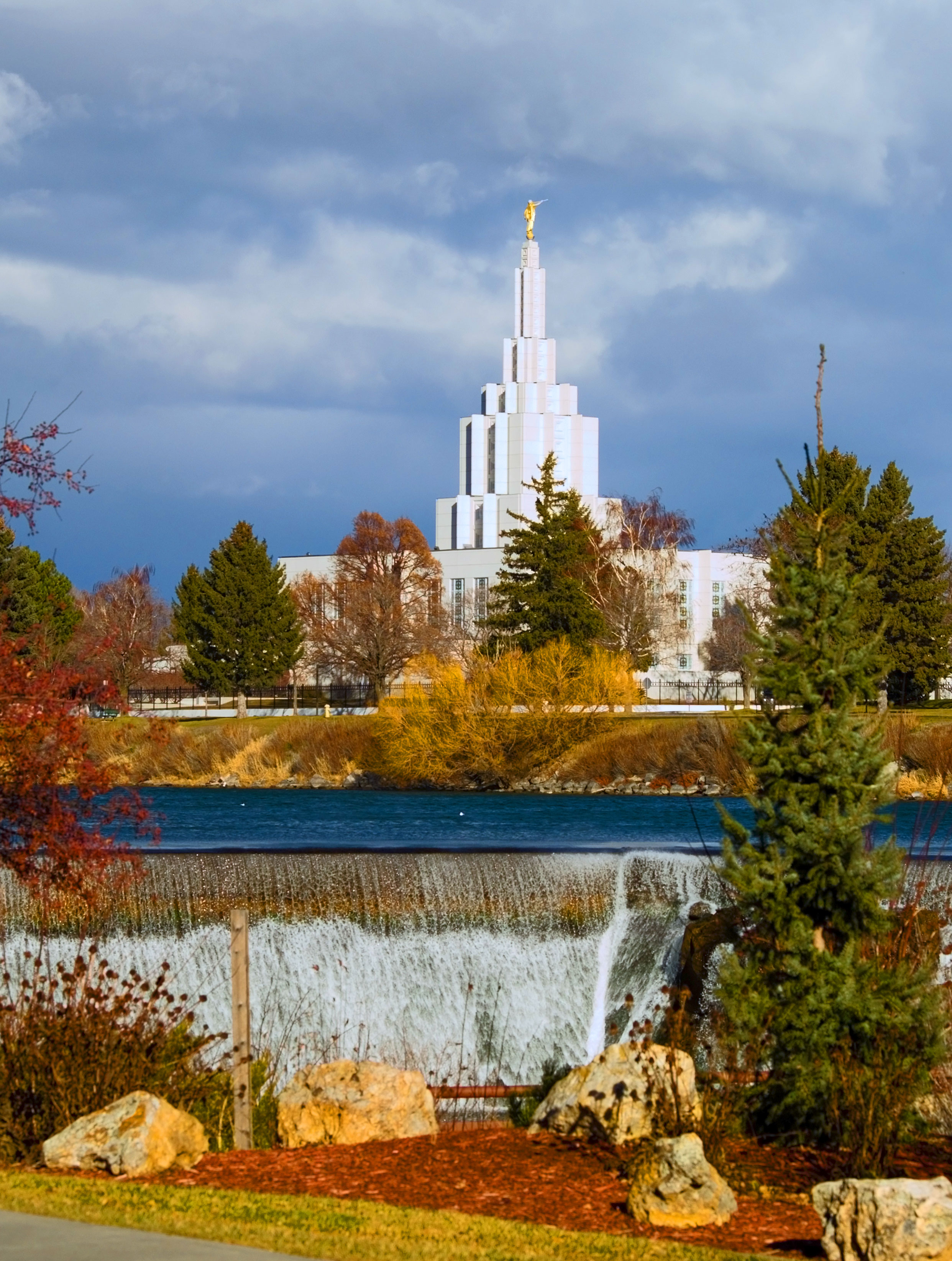
The Idaho Falls Idaho Temple of the Church of Jesus Christ of Latter-day Saints, 2006

Religious self-identification, per Public Religion Research Institute's 2022 American Values Survey
1. Protestantism (37.0%)
2. Church of Jesus Christ of Latter-day Saints (24.0%)
3. Catholicism (9.00%)
4. Jehovah's Witness (2.00%)
5. Unaffiliated (26.0%)
6. New Age (3.00%)

According to the Pew Research Center on Religion & Public Life, the self-identified religious affiliations of Idahoans over the age of 18 in 2008 and 2014 were:

Denomination	2008	2014
Christian, including:	81%	67%
* Evangelical Protestant	22%	21%
* Mainline Protestant	16%	16%
* Catholic	18%	10%
* Eastern Orthodox	< 0.5%	1%
* Historically Black Protestant	< 0.5%	< 1%
* The Church of Jesus Christ of Latter-day Saints	23% (Note: Figure for all adherents of Mormonism; 2008 survey did not distinguish LDS from other Mormons)	19%
* Other Mormon churches	n/d	1%
* Jehovah's Witnesses	1%	< 1%
* Other Christian	< 0.5%	< 1%
Unaffiliated, including:	18%	27%
* Nothing in particular	n/d	22%
* Agnostic	n/d	3%
* Atheist	n/d	2%
Non-Christian faiths, including:	n/d	4%
* Muslim	< 0.5%	1%
* Jewish	< 0.5%	< 1%
* Buddhist	< 0.5%	< 1%
* Hindu	< 0.5%	< 1%
* Other world religions	< 0.5%	< 1%
* Other faiths (e.g., New Age beliefs, Native American religion, etc.)	n/d	2%
Don't know/refused	< 0.5%	1%

According to the Association of Religion Data Archives, the largest denominations by number of members in 2010 were the Church of Jesus Christ of Latter-day Saints with 409,265; the Catholic Church with 123,400; non-denominational Protestants with 62,637; and the Assemblies of God with 22,183. In 2020, the Association of Religion Data Archives revealed Mormons remained the largest with 462,069, followed by Catholics (203,790), and non-denominational Protestants (98,996).

In 2022, the Public Religion Research Institute's American Values Survey estimated that 72% of the population was Christian, 26% were religiously unaffiliated, and 3% were New Agers. Of its Christian population, 37% were Protestant, 24% Mormon, 9% Catholic, and 2% Jehovah's Witnesses.

=== Language ===
English is the state's predominant language. Minority languages include Spanish and various Native American languages.

=== Vital statistics ===
Year	Population	Live births	Deaths	Natural change	Crude birth rate (per 1,000)	Crude death rate (per 1,000)	Natural change (per 1,000)	Crude migration change (per 1,000)
2000	1,299,430	20,366	9,563	10,803	15.7	7.4	8.3	
2001	1,319,962	20,688	9,753	10,935	15.7	7.4	8.3	7.3
2002	1,340,372	20,970	9,923	11,047	15.6	7.4	8.2	7.0
2003	1,363,380	21,800	10,380	11,420	16.0	7.6	8.4	8.5
2004	1,391,802	22,532	10,028	12,504	16.2	7.2	9.0	11.4
2005	1,428,241	23,062	10,556	12,506	16.1	7.4	8.7	16.8
2006	1,468,669	24,184	10,613	13,571	16.5	7.2	9.3	18.3
2007	1,505,105	25,019	10,822	14,197	16.6	7.2	9.4	14.8
2008	1,534,320	25,149	10,962	14,187	16.4	7.1	9.3	9.8
2009	1,554,439	23,737	11,098	12,639	15.3	7.1	8.2	4.8
2010	1,571,339	23,198	11,429	11,769	14.8	7.3	7.5	3.3
2011	1,586,880	22,305	12,027	10,278	14.1	7.6	6.5	3.3
2012	1,600,611	22,963	11,998	10,965	14.3	7.5	6.8	1.7
2013	1,618,841	22,383	12,434	9,949	13.8	7.7	6.1	5.1
2014	1,641,124	22,876	12,613	10,263	13.9	7.7	6.2	7.3
2015	1,663,458	22,827	13,026	9,801	13.7	7.8	5.9	7.5
2016	1,697,093	22,482	13,366	9,116	13.2	7.9	5.3	14.4
2017	1,734,888	22,181	14,011	8,170	12.8	8.1	4.7	17.1
2018	1,769,305	21,403	14,261	7,142	12.1	8.1	4.0	15.4
2019	1,808,378	22,063	14,430	7,633	12.2	8.0	4.2	17.4
2020	1,849,328	21,533	16,402	5,131	11.6	8.9	2.7	19.4
2021	1,904,855	22,427	18,346	4,081	11.8	9.6	2.2	27.0
2022	1,942,951	22,391	17,162	5,229	11.5	8.8	2.7	16.9
2023	1,970,497	22,397	16,474	5,923	11.4	8.4	3.0	11.0
2024	2,000,872	23,276	16,758	6,518	11.6	8.4	3.2	11.9
2025	2,029,733	24,068	16,723	7,345	11.9	8.2	3.7	10.6

== Economy ==
In 2025, the gross state product (state GDP) for Idaho was $135.5 billion and the state's per capita personal income was $64,846. Idaho had the 39th highest GDP per capita in the United States of America in 2025.

In 2025, small businesses made up 96.6% of employers and employed 56.0% of the state's work force. As of May 2025, the state's unemployment rate was 3.6%. Total employment in Idaho in 2024 was 965,824.

Idaho is the top potato producing state in the United States and almost one-third of the nation's potatoes are grown in the Snake River Plain, a belt of low-lying land that extends across southern Idaho.

Important industries in Idaho are food processing, lumber and wood products, machinery, chemical products, paper products, electronics manufacturing, silver and other mining, and tourism. The world's largest factory for barrel cheese, the raw product for processed cheese, is in Gooding, Idaho. It has a capacity of 120,000 metric tons per year of barrel cheese and belongs to the Glanbia group.

As Idaho neared statehood, mining and other extractive industries played a significant role in its economy. Although the state's reliance on mining has diminished over time, Idaho remains renowned as "The Gem State" due to its production of seventy-two varieties of precious and semi-precious stones. Idaho is a leading national producer of potatoes, trout, Austrian winter peas, and lentils. The state's primary industries include manufacturing, agriculture, food processing, timber, and mining. Tourism is another way that Idaho capitalizes on its natural resources. The same tracts of wilderness that attracted Ernest Hemingway to the region in the early 1960s, continue to attract outdoor enthusiasts with camping, hunting, fishing, as well as whitewater kayaking and rafting, and skiing.

Idaho introduced a state gambling lottery in 1989, which has contributed over $1.2 billion to public schools, infrastructure, and state owned buildings as of July 2025.

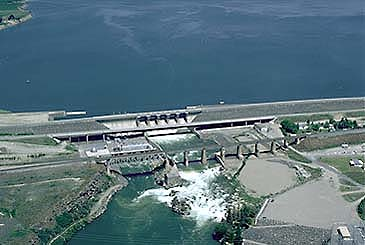
American Falls Dam

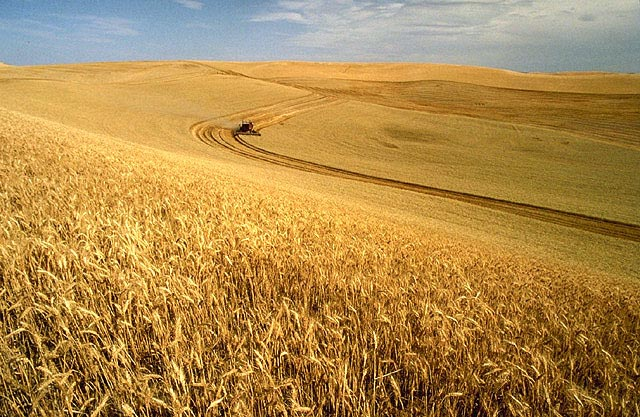
Wheat harvest on the Palouse

=== Taxation ===
Tax is collected by the Idaho State Tax Commission.

The state personal income tax is a flat 5.8%. Idahoans may apply for state tax credits for taxes paid to other states, as well as for donations to Idaho state educational entities and some nonprofit youth and rehabilitation facilities.

The state sales tax is 6% with a very limited, selective local option up to 6.5%. Sales tax applies to the sale, rental or lease of tangible personal property and some services. Food is taxed, but prescription drugs are not. Hotel, motel, and campground accommodations are taxed at a higher rate (7% to 11%). Some jurisdictions impose local option sales tax.

The sales tax was introduced at 3% in 1965, easily approved by voters, where it remained at 3% until 1983.

== Energy ==
Idaho has a regulated electricity market, with the Idaho Public Utilities Commission regulating the three major utilities of Avista Utilities, Idaho Power, and Rocky Mountain Power.

Idaho consumes almost four times more energy than it produces. In 2022, renewable energy sources accounted for 75% of the total electricity generated in the state, the fourth-highest share of renewable electricity for any state. In 2022, half of Idaho's utility-scale (1 megawatt or larger) electricity generating capacity is at hydroelectric power plants, 25% from natural gas, 17% of the state's total in-state electricity net generation came from wind facilities, 4% from solar and 1% from geothermal. Washington State provides most of the natural gas used in Idaho through one of the two major pipeline systems supplying the state.

Idaho has an upper-boundary estimate of development potential to generate 44,320 GWh/year from 18,076 MW of wind power, and 7,467,000 GWh/year from solar power using 2,061,000 MW of photovoltaics (PV), including 3,224 MW of rooftop photovoltaics, and 1,267,000 MW of concentrated solar power. Idaho had 973 MW of installed wind power as of 2020.

== Transportation ==
The Idaho Transportation Department is the government agency responsible for Idaho's transportation infrastructure, including operations and maintenance, as well as planning for future needs. The agency is also responsible for overseeing the disbursement of federal, state, and grant funding for the transportation programs of the state.

=== Highways ===
I-15 shield

US-95 shield

Major federal aid highways in Idaho:

- North/South
  - US 89
  - US 91
  - US 93
  - US 95
- West/East
  - US 2
  - US 12
  - US 20
  - US 26
  - US 30
- Interstates
  - I-15
  - I-84
  - I-86
  - I-90
  - I-184

=== Airports ===
Major airports include the Boise Airport which serves the southwest region of Idaho and the Spokane International Airport (in Spokane, Washington) which serves northern Idaho. Other airports with scheduled service are the Pullman-Moscow Regional Airport serving the Palouse; the Lewiston-Nez Perce County Airport, serving the Lewis-Clark Valley and north central and west central Idaho; The Magic Valley Regional Airport in Twin Falls; Friedman Memorial Airport in Hailey; the Idaho Falls Regional Airport; and the Pocatello Regional Airport.

=== Railroads ===
Idaho is served by three transcontinental railroads. The Burlington Northern Santa Fe (BNSF) connects the Idaho Panhandle with Seattle, Portland, and Spokane to the west, and Minneapolis and Chicago to the east. The BNSF travels through Kootenai, Bonner, and Boundary counties. The Union Pacific Railroad crosses North Idaho, entering from Canada through Boundary and Bonner, and proceeding to Spokane. Canadian Pacific Railway uses Union Pacific Railroad tracks in North Idaho, carrying products from Alberta to Spokane and Portland, Oregon. Amtrak's Empire Builder crosses northern Idaho, with its only stop being in Sandpoint. Montana Rail Link also operates between Billings, Montana, and Sandpoint, Idaho.

The Union Pacific Railroad also crosses southern Idaho traveling between Portland, Oregon, Green River, Wyoming, and Ogden, Utah, and serves Boise, Nampa, Twin Falls, and Pocatello.

=== Ports ===
The Port of Lewiston is the farthest inland Pacific port on the west coast. A series of dams and locks on the Snake River and Columbia River facilitate barge travel from Lewiston to Portland, where goods are loaded on ocean-going vessels.

== Law and government ==
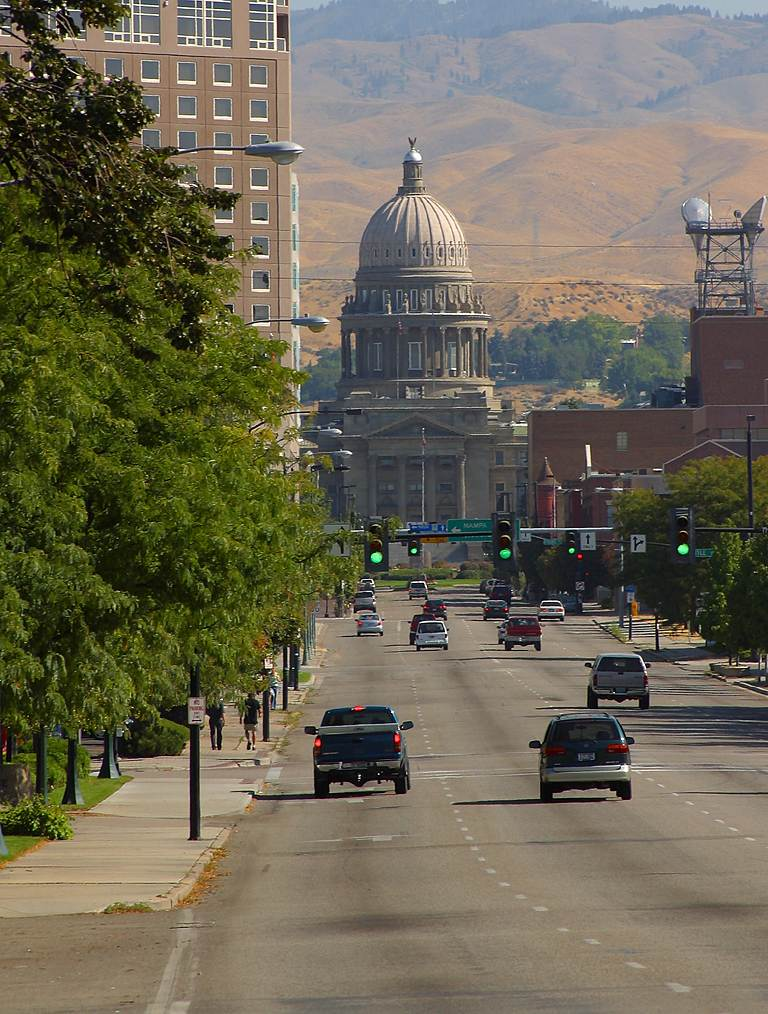
The Idaho State Capitol in Boise

=== State constitution ===
Logo for the State of Idaho.

The Constitution of Idaho is roughly modeled after the national Constitution, with several additions. The constitution defines the form and functions of the state government, and may be amended through plebiscite. The state constitution presently requires the state government to maintain a balanced budget.

=== Idaho Code and Statutes ===
All of Idaho's state laws are contained in the Idaho Code and Statutes. The code is amended through the legislature with the governor's approval. Idaho still operates under its original (1889) state constitution.

Idaho has one of the strictest abortion laws in the nation. In April 2023, Idaho became the first state to restrict interstate travel for abortion services. Nearly all abortions are banned and private citizens can sue abortion providers. The Idaho Supreme Court has ruled there is no constitutional right to abortion. A federal judge ruled in 2022 that doctors cannot be punished for performing an abortion to protect a patient's health. The state abortion laws have led to an outmigration of physicians who specialize in maternal/fetal care.

=== State government ===
The constitution of Idaho provides for three branches of government: the executive, legislative, and judicial branches. Idaho has a bicameral legislature, elected from 35 legislative districts, each represented by one senator and two representatives.

Since 1946, statewide elected constitutional officers have been elected to four-year terms. They include: Governor, Lieutenant Governor, Secretary of State, Idaho state controller (Auditor before 1994), Treasurer, Attorney General, and Superintendent of Public Instruction.

Last contested in 1966, the office of Inspector of Mines was originally an elected constitutional position. Afterward, it was an appointed position and ultimately done away with entirely in 1974.

Idaho's government has an alcohol monopoly; the Idaho State Liquor Division.

==== Executive branch ====
The governor of Idaho serves a four-year term and is elected during what is nationally referred to as midterm elections. As such, the governor is not elected in the same election year as the president of the United States. The current governor is Republican Brad Little, who was first elected in 2018 and re-elected in 2022. Idaho is one of 13 states that has no term limits for its governor.

==== Legislative branch ====
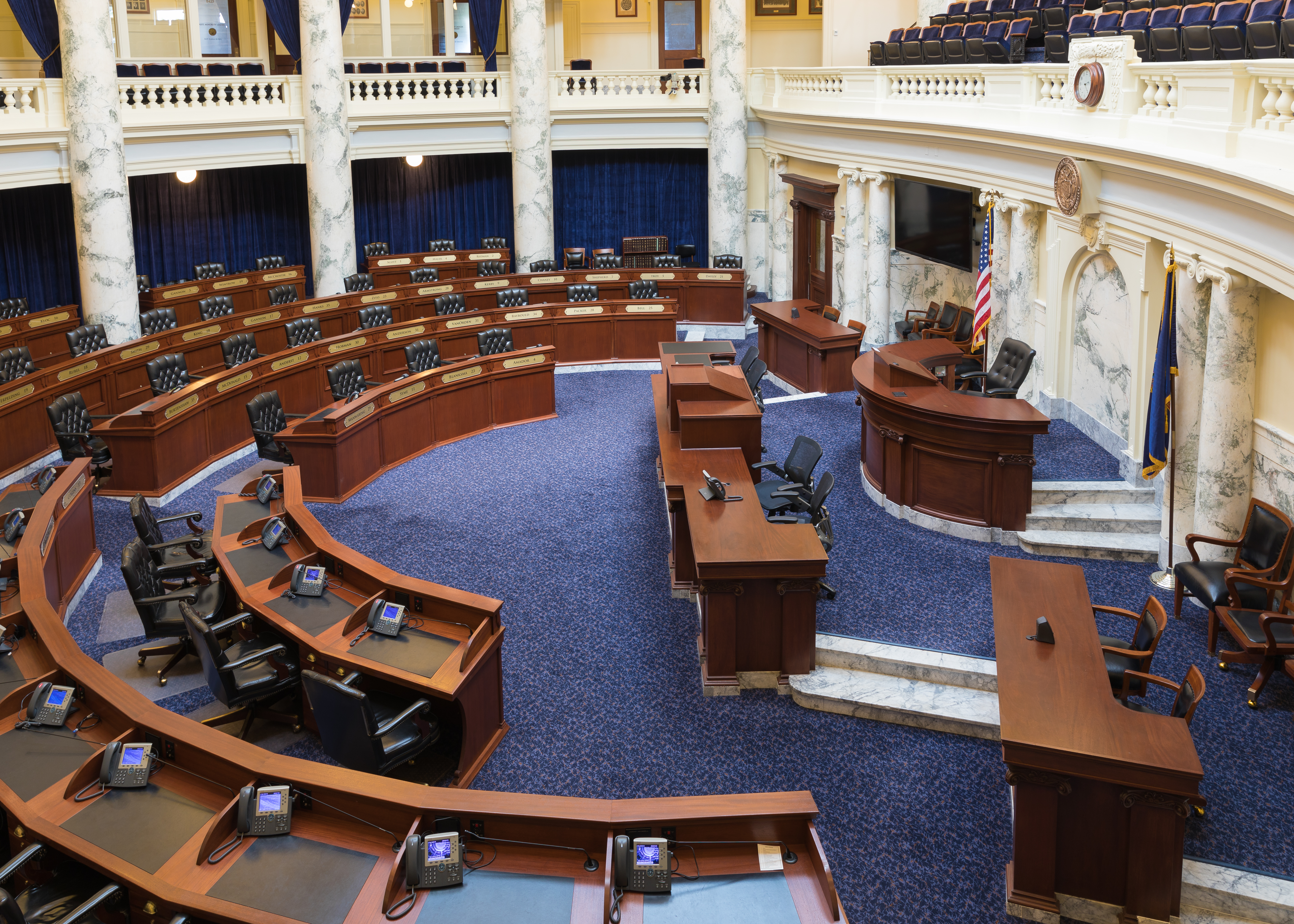
Chamber of the House of Representatives in 2018

Idaho's legislature is part-time. Because of this, Idaho's legislators are considered "citizen legislators", meaning their position as a legislator is not their main occupation. However, the session may be extended if necessary, and often is.

Terms for both the Senate and House of Representatives are two years. Legislative elections occur every even-numbered year.

Both of Idaho's state legislative chambers have been continuously controlled by Republicans since 1960. However, Democratic legislators are routinely elected from Boise, Pocatello, Blaine County, and the northern Panhandle.

==== Judicial branch ====
The highest court in Idaho is the Idaho Supreme Court. There is also an intermediate appellate court, the Idaho Court of Appeals, which hears cases assigned to it from the Supreme Court. The state's District Courts serve seven judicial districts.

=== Politics ===
Party registration by Idaho county (January 2023) Republican >= 40% Republican >= 50% Republican >= 60% Republican >= 70% Republican >= 80% Unaffiliated >= 40%

Voter Registration Totals as of October 1, 2025:
Party	Number of Voters	Percentage
Republican	626,417	61.71%
Unaffiliated	254,542	25.07%
Democratic	119,759	11.79%
Libertarian	10,262	1.01%
Constitution	4,114	0.40%
Total	1,015,094	100.00%

After the Civil War, many Midwestern and Southern Democrats moved to the Idaho Territory. As a result, the early territorial legislatures were solidly controlled by Democrats. In contrast, most of the territorial governors were appointed by Republican presidents and were Republicans. This led to sometimes-bitter clashes between the two parties, including a range war with the Democrats backing the sheepherders and the Republicans backing the cattlemen, which ended in the "Diamondfield" Jack Davis murder trial. In the 1880s, Republicans gained prominence in local politics.

In 1864, Clinton DeWitt Smith removed the territorial seal and the state constitution from a locked safe and took them to Boise. This effectively moved the capital from where they were stored (Lewiston, Idaho) to the current capital, Boise.

Since Idaho's statehood, the Republican Party has typically been the dominant party in the state. At one time, Idaho had two Democratic parties, one being the mainstream and the other called the Anti-Mormon Democrats, lasting into the early 20th century. In the 1890s and early 1900s, the Populist Party enjoyed prominence, while the Democratic Party maintained a brief dominance in the 1930s during the Great Depression. Since World War II, most statewide-elected officials have been Republicans, though the Democrats did hold the majority in the House (by one seat) in 1958 and the governorship from 1971 to 1995.

Idaho's congressional delegation has also been generally Republican since statehood. Several Idaho Democrats have had electoral success in the U.S. House of Representatives over the years, but the Senate delegation has been a Republican stronghold for decades. Several Idaho Republicans, including current Senators Mike Crapo and Jim Risch, have won reelection to the Senate, but only Frank Church has won reelection as a Democrat. Church's 1974 victory was the last win for his party for either Senate seat, and Walt Minnick's 2008 victory in the 1st congressional district was the last Democratic win in any congressional race.

In modern times, Idaho has been a reliably Republican state in presidential politics. It has not supported a Democrat for president since 1964. Even in that election, Lyndon B. Johnson defeated Barry Goldwater in the state by fewer than two percentage points, compared to a landslide nationally. In the 2004 United States presidential election, Republican George W. Bush carried Idaho by a margin of 38 percentage points and with 68.4% of the vote, winning in 43 of 44 counties. Only Blaine County, which contains the Sun Valley ski resort, supported John Kerry, who owns a home in the area. In 2008 Barack Obama's 36.1 percent showing was the best for a Democratic presidential candidate in Idaho since 1976. However, Republican margins were narrower in 1992 and 1976.

In the 2006 elections, Republicans, led by gubernatorial candidate Butch Otter, won all the state's constitutional offices and retained both of the state's seats in the House. However, Democrats picked up several seats in the Idaho Legislature, notably in the Boise area.

Idaho retains the death penalty. Pending the outcome of a legal challenge on a bill passed on March 20, 2023, authorized methods of execution include the firing squad. Abortion is severely restricted in Idaho.

== Education ==
=== K–12 ===
As of January 2020, the State of Idaho contains 105 school districts and 62 charter schools. The school districts range in enrollment from two to 39,507 students.

Idaho school districts are governed by elected school boards, which are elected in November of odd-numbered years, except for the Boise School District, whose elections are held in September.

=== Colleges and universities ===
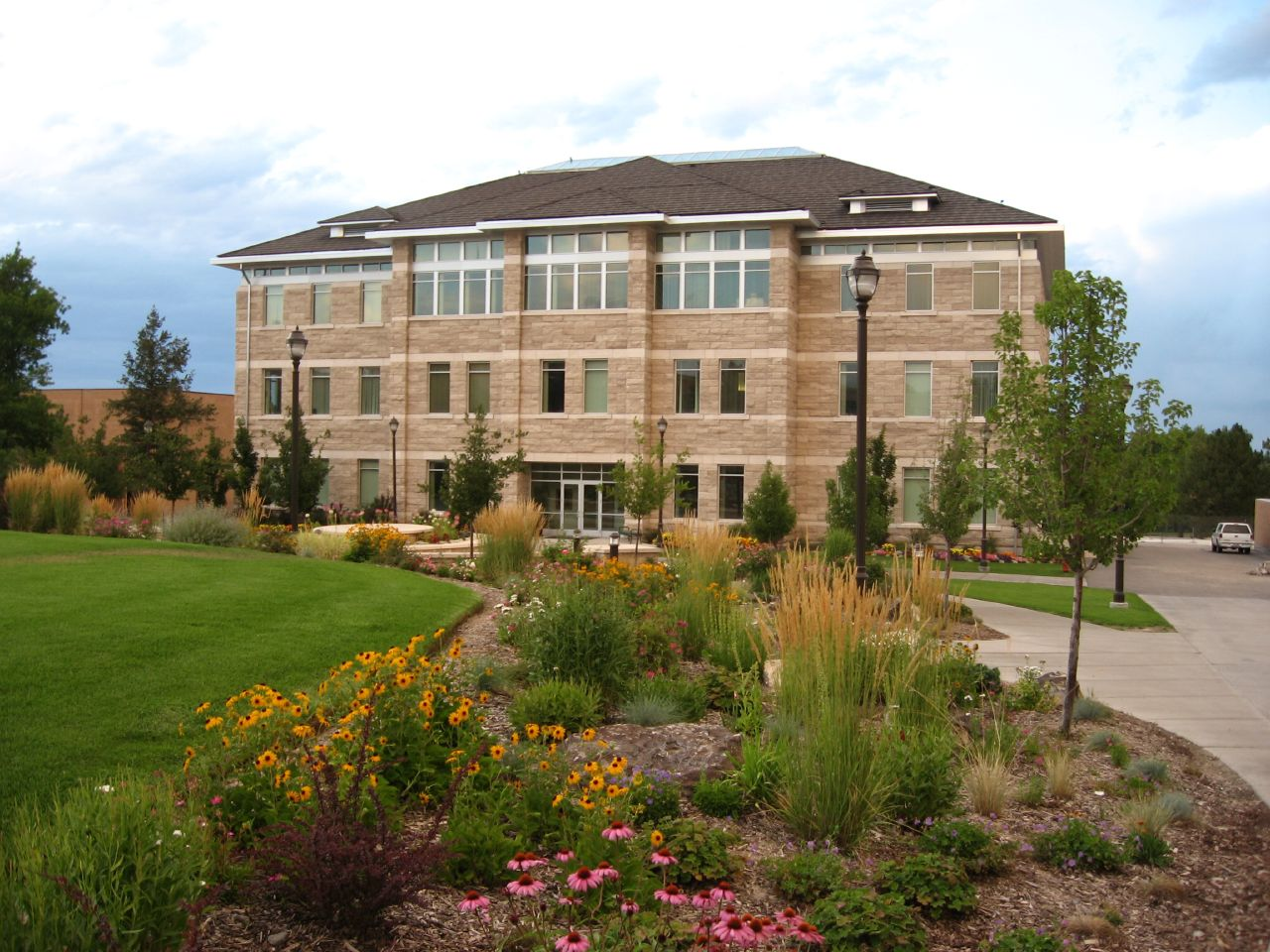
The Jacob Spori Building at Brigham Young University-Idaho in Rexburg

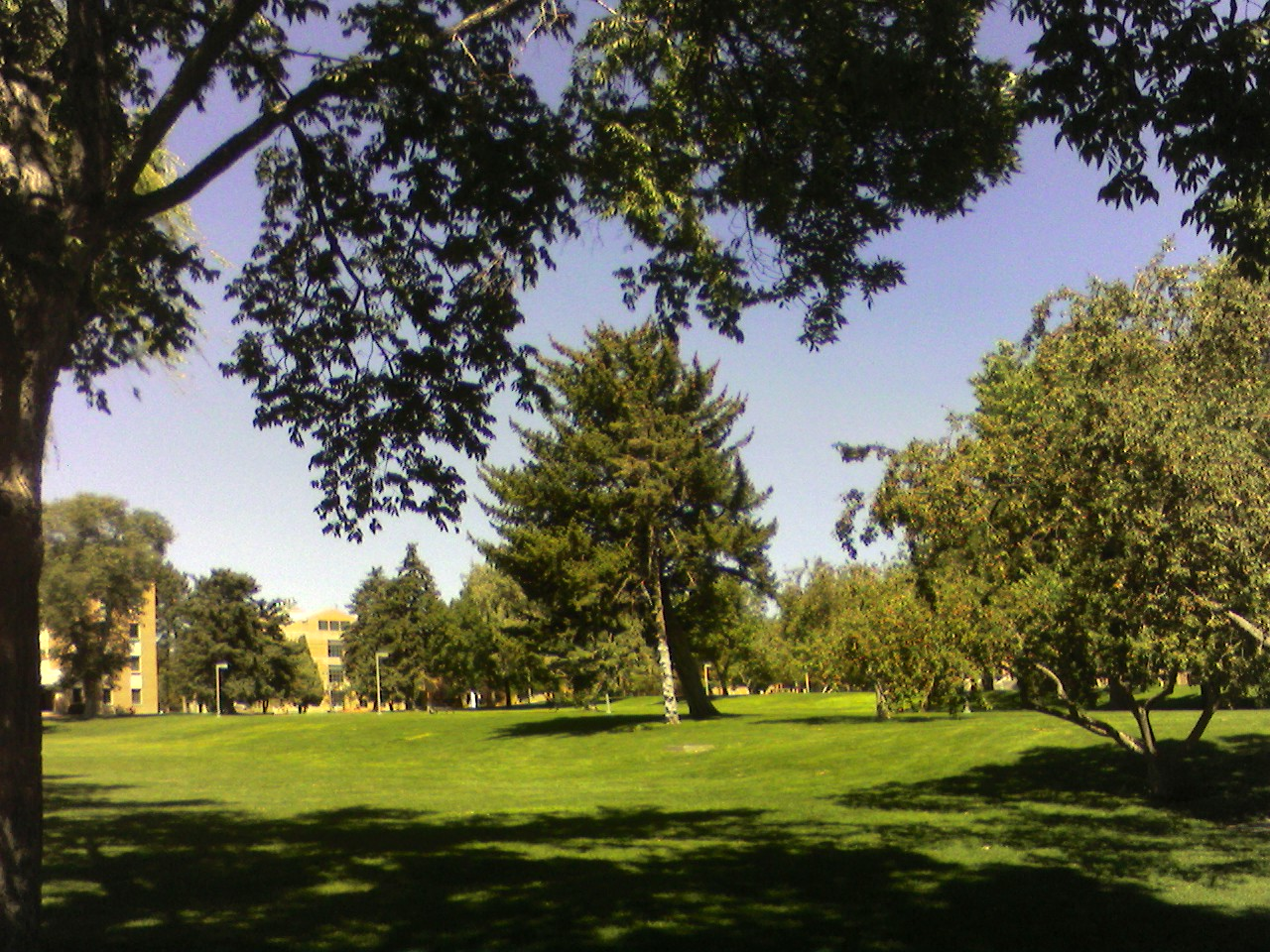
Idaho State University in Pocatello

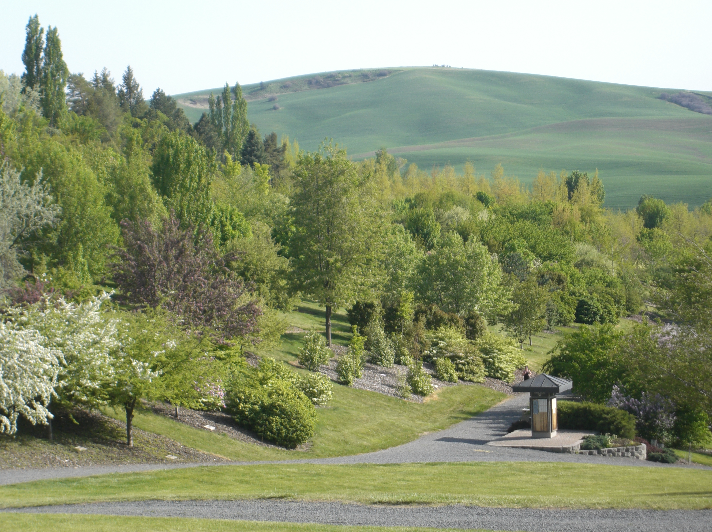
University of Idaho Arboretum in Moscow

The Idaho State Board of Education oversees three comprehensive universities. The University of Idaho in Moscow was the first university in the state (founded in 1889). It opened its doors in 1892 and is the land-grant institution and primary research university of the state. Idaho State University in Pocatello opened in 1901 as the Academy of Idaho, attained four-year status in 1947 and university status in 1963. Boise State University is the most recent school to attain university status in Idaho. The school opened in 1932 as Boise Junior College and became Boise State University in 1974. Lewis-Clark State College in Lewiston is the only public, non-university four-year college in Idaho. It opened as a normal school in 1893.

Idaho has four regional community colleges: North Idaho College in Coeur d'Alene; College of Southern Idaho in Twin Falls; College of Western Idaho in Nampa, which opened in 2009, College of Eastern Idaho in Idaho Falls, which transitioned from a technical college in 2017.

Private institutions in Idaho are Boise Bible College, affiliated with congregations of the Christian churches and churches of Christ; Brigham Young University-Idaho in Rexburg, which is affiliated with the Church of Jesus Christ of Latter-day Saints and a sister college to Brigham Young University; The College of Idaho in Caldwell, which still maintains a loose affiliation with the Presbyterian Church; Northwest Nazarene University in Nampa; and New Saint Andrews College in Moscow, of Reformed Christian theological background. McCall College is a non-affiliated two-year private college in McCall that was founded in 2011 and later opened in 2013.

- Boise Bible College
- Boise State University
- Brigham Young University-Idaho (formerly Ricks College)
- College of Idaho (formerly Albertson College of Idaho)
- College of Southern Idaho
- College of Western Idaho
- College of Eastern Idaho
- Idaho State University
- Lewis-Clark State College
- McCall College
- New Saint Andrews College
- North Idaho College
- Northwest Nazarene University
- University of Idaho

== Health ==
=== Ban on COVID-19 vaccines ===
In October 2024, a health department in Idaho voted 4–3 to stop providing COVID-19 vaccines to residents in six counties. Opposite mainstream healthcare providers' and epidemiologists' pleas against the decision were more than 290 public comments, many of which called for an end to vaccine mandates or taxpayer funding of the vaccines, neither of which was happening in the district.

=== Hantavirus ===
In 2026, the irrigation system (irrigation canals) around Boise is causing rats from California to migrate into the state. There is an influx of rats in Idaho and there is a concern that the hantavirus could spread to the local population. There has been evidence of deer rats and other species of rats carrying the hantavirus in northern and central Idaho.

== Sports ==
Central Idaho is home to one of North America's oldest ski resorts, Sun Valley, where the world's first chairlift was installed in 1936. Other noted outdoor sites include Hells Canyon, the Salmon River, and its embarkation point of Riggins.

Club	Sport	League
Boise Hawks	Baseball	Pioneer League
Boise State Broncos	NCAA	Div I FBS, MWC
Idaho Vandals	NCAA	Div I FCS, Big Sky
Idaho State Bengals	NCAA	Div I FCS, Big Sky
Idaho Falls Chukars	Baseball	Pioneer League
Idaho Steelheads	Ice hockey	ECHL
Idaho Horsemen	Indoor football	National Arena League
Idaho Falls Spud Kings	Ice hockey	USPHL
Athletic Club Boise	Soccer	USL League 1

The Boise Open professional golf tournament has been played at Hillcrest Country Club since 1990 as part of the Korn Ferry Tour. The Open has been part of the Korn Ferry Tour Finals since 2016.

High school sports are overseen by the Idaho High School Activities Association (IHSAA).

In 2016, Meridian's Michael Slagowski ran 800 meters in 1:48.70, one of the 35 fastest times ever run by a high school boy in the United States.

== In popular culture ==
The 1980 movie Bronco Billy was filmed in Boise for two months. Pale Rider (1985) was primarily filmed in the Boulder Mountains and the Sawtooth National Recreation Area in central Idaho, just north of Sun Valley. River Phoenix and Keanu Reeves starred in the 1991 movie My Own Private Idaho, portions of which take place in Idaho. The 1997 film Dante's Peak was shot on location in Wallace. The 2004 cult film Napoleon Dynamite takes place in Preston; the film's director, Jared Hess, attended Preston High School. The 2013 coming-of-age film The To Do List is set in Boise, the hometown of its director Maggie Carey.

== See also ==
- History of Chinese Americans in Idaho
- Index of Idaho-related articles
- Outline of Idaho
- USS Idaho, five ships

== Explanatory notes ==
Preceded by Washington	List of U.S. states by date of statehood Admitted on July 3, 1890 (43rd)	Succeeded by Wyoming
