= McCall College =

Coordinates: 43°36′51″N 116°30′26″W

- Motto: Peaking the Passion
- Type: two-year private college
- Established: 2011; 15 years ago
- President: Dr. L. Bryan Williams
- Location: McCall, Idaho, U.S.
- Campus: Rural
- Colors: cardinal, gold
- Website: McCallCollege.org

McCall College (McCC) is an American private college in McCall, Idaho, United States. It primarily serves Valley County, Adams County and Idaho County. McCall is also a destination college for students from the Pacific Northwest.

== History ==
McCall College, a community-based college in McCall Idaho, was first proposed by Dr. L. Bryan Williams on his arrival in McCall during the late summer of 2010. During 2011, Williams proposed the idea to a local businessperson, Woody Woodworth and a retired university administrator, Dave Hanson. These three founders incorporated McCall College on December 27, 2011.

In 2012, McCall College became registered with the Idaho State Board of Education so that it could offer certificates in higher education as a private proprietary school. By the summer of 2012, the school was working on recruitment and fundraising; its faculty members and administrators were working as unpaid volunteers. McCall began Professional Technical classes in May 2013. McC's first academic course, Introduction to Geology, was offered in the fall of 2013. In 2014, McCall College received its 501(c)3 designation from the Internal Revenue Service.

== Campus ==
The primary campus of McCall College is located in the Park Place Professional Center in McCall Idaho. The campus occupies approximately 6000 square feet of office space. The campus consists of 4 classrooms, an academic center, a student center, offices and conference space. The college also offers Thursday night classes at St Luke's Boise Medical Center, Anderson Building.

== Academics ==
=== Programs ===
Professional Technical Certificate = ProTech

Community Programs	Active Courses	Professional Technical Programs
short events	8 weeks duration	(1 year or less; 32 hours)
computer workshops	Intro to Windows Office	
Ethics training	Principles of Health Care & Bioethics	Certificate in Bioethics (started 2015)
Business plan workshops	Introduction to Entrepreneurship	Entrepreneurship (started 2013)
Fine Art	Introduction to Drawing	

== Leadership ==
President
2012–present—Dr. L. Bryan Williams

Board Chair
2012–present—Woody Woodworth

Academic Dean
2012–present—Dr. R. Bruce Moore

== Athletics ==
McCall College neither currently fields athletic teams nor has a mascot.
