= Boise Bible College =

Coordinates: 43.657797°N 116.290583°W

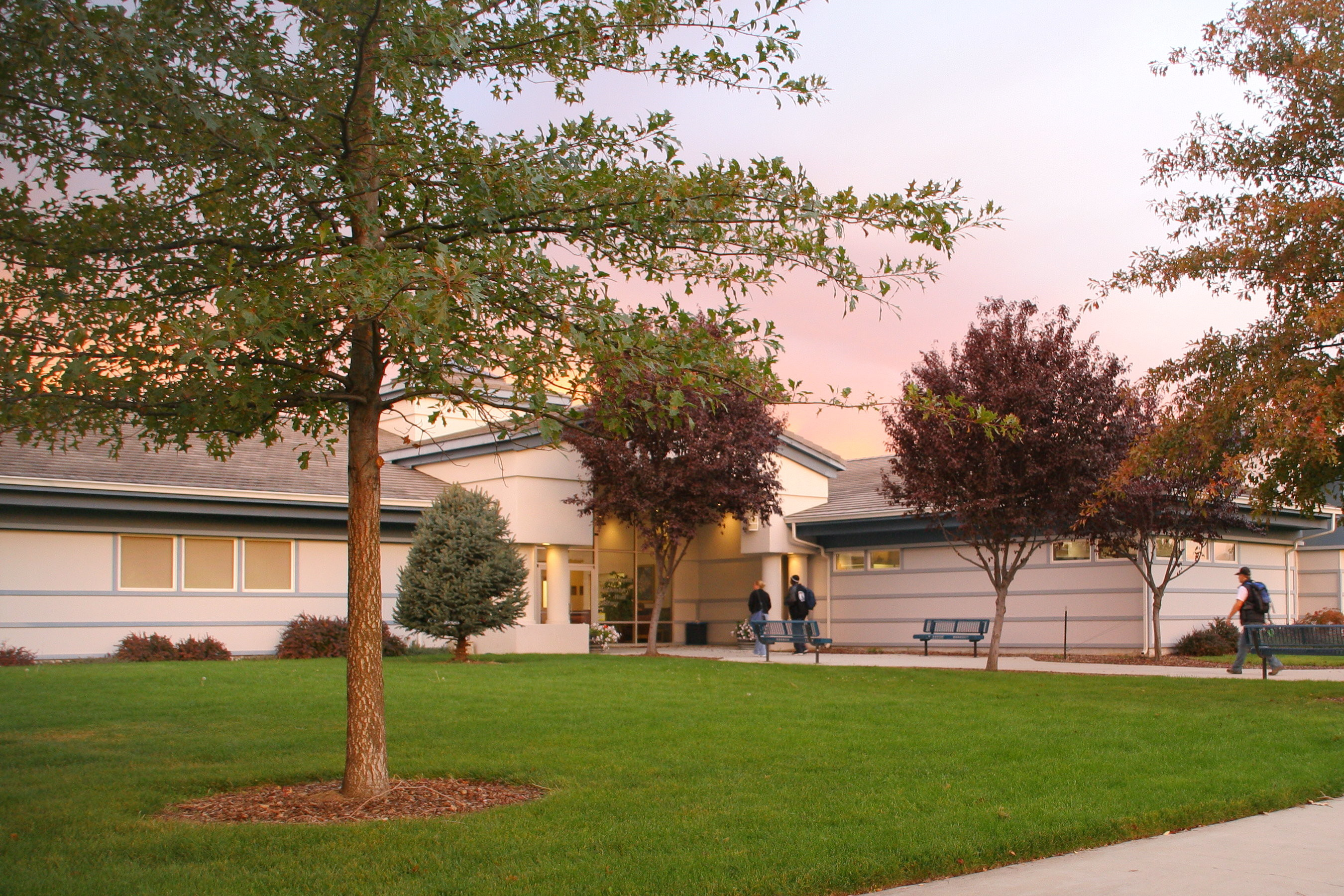
- Type: Private Bible college
- Established: 1945; 81 years ago
- Founders: Orin Hardenbrook
- Religious affiliation: Christian churches and churches of Christ
- President: Scott Lerwick
- Academic staff: 34
- Administrative staff: 7
- Students: 125
- Location: Garden City, Idaho, United States
- Campus: Rural
- Website: boisebible.edu

Boise Bible College (BBC) is a private Christian Bible college near Boise, Idaho, United States.

== History ==
BBC was founded in 1945 as part of First Church of Christ in Boise. It was housed in the basement of the church building at the corner of 18th and Eastman Streets. Orin Hardenbrook served as its first president.

Kenneth Beckman, minister of First Church of Christ and a member of the college faculty, became president of the college in 1949. He served in this capacity (while still preaching and teaching) until 1973. After stepping down as president and later retiring from preaching, Beckman continued to teach an introductory theology course taken by most first-year students until 2009. In 1995 he was awarded the first honorary doctorate granted by BBC.

In 1974 Boise Bible College separated organizationally from its founding church, becoming an independent institution. J. Richard Ewing was appointed president, the first man to serve in that capacity on a full-time basis. Ewing made it his mission to strengthen the college's faculty and curriculum, and he guided BBC through the process of receiving accreditation through the American Association of Bible Colleges (now called the Association for Biblical Higher Education) in 1988.

Charles Crane became president in 1990. His tenure was marked by a tripling in enrollment and substantial improvements in the college's financial stability and campus facilities. Crane retired on June 30, 2007.

Terry Stine became the college president in 2007. Stine previously served at BBC's missions professor and is the longtime Director of Ninos de Mexico located in Mexico City. He and his team helped the college become debt free.

In 2017, Derek Voorhees became the new college president. Voorhees had been at the college since 2011 teaching classes in New Testament and Spiritual Formation. He was succeeded on September 19, 2024, by the college's 11th president, Scott Lerwick.

== Religious affiliation ==
Boise Bible College is affiliated with congregations of the Christian churches and churches of Christ, which are a part of the Restoration Movement. Because these churches have no denominational structure or hierarchy, BBC operates independently as a non-denominational college. Approximately two-thirds of BBC's student body and the vast majority of its support come from Independent Christian Churches and Churches of Christ, but the college admits students from all Christian denominations.

== Academics ==
Boise Bible College offers degrees in Christian Ministry, Education, and Psychology. There are two and four-year degrees offered in these areas. The Association for Biblical Higher Education (ABHE) has accredited Boise Bible College for the last 31 years.

== Campus ==
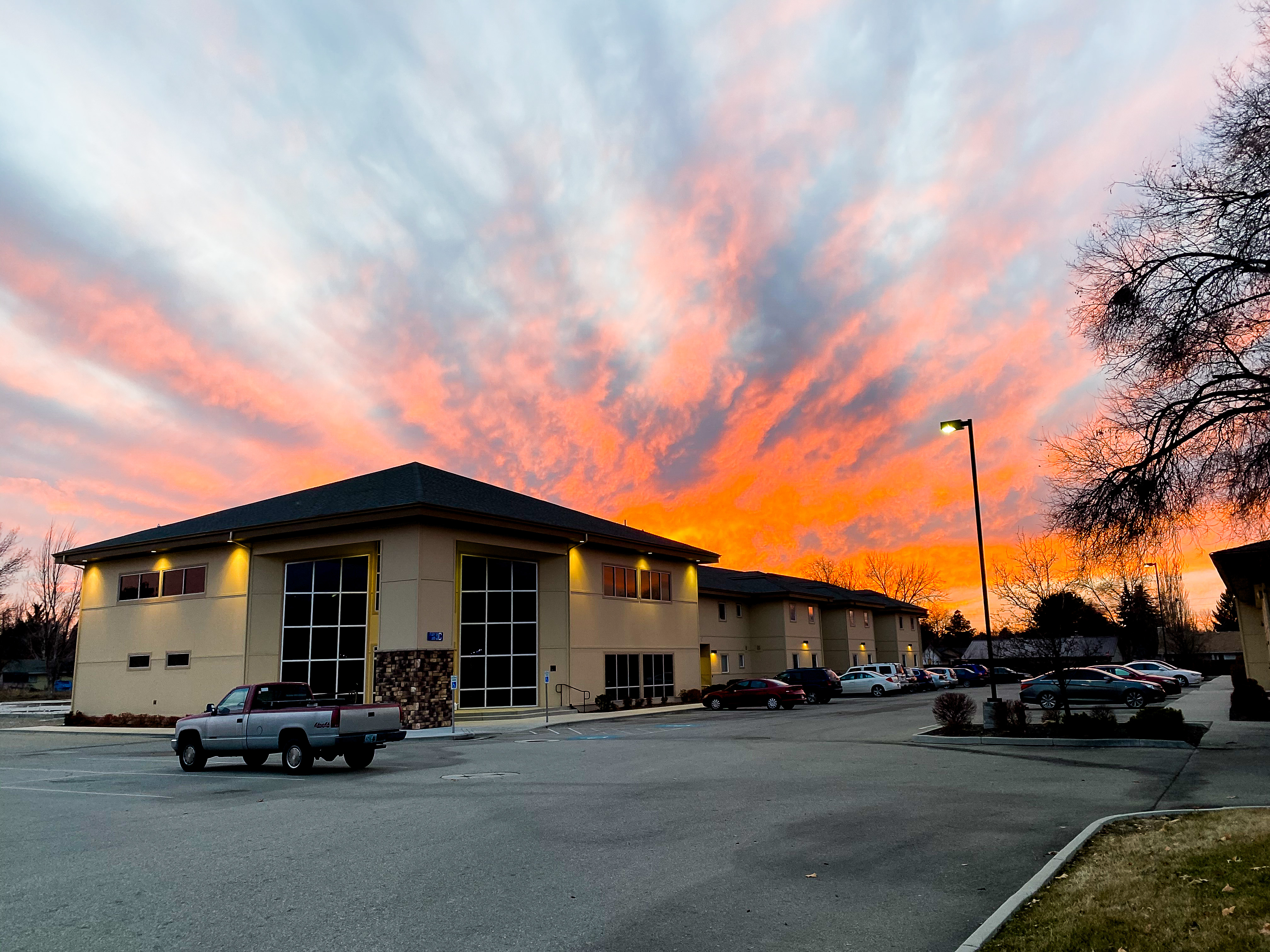
Student Union Building at Boise Bible College

The campus of Boise Bible College is located in Garden City, a small town which is nearly surrounded by the western suburbs of Boise. It is a 16-acre (6.5 ha) site situated in a residential neighborhood.

Two buildings date to the construction of campus in 1974. One is the Multipurpose Building (MPB), housing a gymnasium, cafeteria, student lounges, and music facilities. The other is a small dormitory which also contains the Head Resident's apartment and at one time housed the chapel and three classrooms. (A twin to this dorm was demolished in 2006 to make way for a larger dormitory.)

Two new buildings were added to campus in the early 1990s. An Administration Building opened in 1993; prior to this time all college offices were located in the lower level of one of the dormitories. The Library/Classroom Building was completed in 1995, which allowed the library to move from its cramped quarters in the MPB into a modern facility and provided needed classroom space for the growing student body and expanding programs of the college.

To accommodate growth, several construction projects began in the mid-2000s. The first phase of a new residence hall was opened for the Fall 2006 semester; the remaining phases (additional dormitory wing) are planned for the near future. A wing was also added to the Library/Classroom Building. This addition, including a new chapel, two auditorium-style lecture halls, and additional classroom space opened for the Spring 2007 semester.

In 2015, phase two of the construction project (i.e. the Student Center) opened and was completed.

== Student body ==
BBC currently enrolls about 125 students. Approximately one third of these students come from the Boise metro area, and another third from western Oregon. Most of the remaining third come from elsewhere within the Pacific Northwest and the western United States. A few students come from other regions of the U.S. or from overseas. International students have come from Great Britain, China, India, Pakistan, Zimbabwe, Poland, New Zealand and Australia. About half of the students live on campus, but this varies from year to year.
