= Geography of Idaho =

The counties of Idaho

The U.S. state of Idaho borders six other U.S. states and one Canadian province. The states of Washington and Oregon are to the west, Nevada and Utah are to the south, and Montana and Wyoming are to the east. Idaho also shares a short border with the Canadian province of British Columbia to the north.

== Overview ==
The landscape is rugged, with some of the largest unspoiled natural areas in the United States. For example, at 2.3 million acres (930,000 ha), the Frank Church-River of No Return Wilderness Area is the largest contiguous area of protected wilderness in the lower 48 states. Idaho is a Rocky Mountain state with abundant natural resources and scenic areas. The state has snow-capped mountain ranges, rapids, vast lakes and steep canyons. The waters of the Snake River run through Hells Canyon, the deepest gorge in the United States. Shoshone Falls falls down cliffs from a height greater than Niagara Falls.

By far, the most important river in Idaho is the Snake River, a major tributary of the Columbia River. The Snake River flows out from Yellowstone in northwestern Wyoming through the Snake River Plain in southern Idaho before turning north, leaving the state at Lewiston before joining the Columbia in Kennewick. Other major rivers are the Clark Fork/Pend Oreille River, the Spokane River, and, many major tributaries of the Snake River, including the Clearwater River, the Salmon River, the Boise River, and the Payette River. The Salmon River empties into the Snake in Hells Canyon and forms the southern boundary of Nez Perce County on its north shore, of which Lewiston is the county seat. The Port of Lewiston, at the confluence of the Clearwater and the Snake Rivers is the farthest inland seaport on the West Coast at 465 river miles from the Pacific at Astoria, Oregon.

The vast majority of Idaho's population lives in the Snake River Plain, a valley running from across the entirety of southern Idaho from east to west. The valley contains the major cities of Boise, Meridian, Nampa, Caldwell, Twin Falls, Idaho Falls, and Pocatello. The plain served as an easy pass through the Rocky Mountains for westward-bound settlers on the Oregon Trail, and many settlers chose to settle the area rather than risking the treacherous route through the Blue Mountains and the Cascade Range to the west. The western region of the plain is known as the Treasure Valley, bound between the Owyhee Mountains to the southwest and the Boise Mountains to the northeast. The central region of the Snake River Plain is known as the Magic Valley.

Idaho's highest point is Borah Peak, 12,662 ft (3,859 m), in the Lost River Range north of Mackay. In 1983, an earthquake there caused two fatalities. Idaho's lowest point, 710 ft (216 m), is in Lewiston, where the Clearwater River joins the Snake River and continues into Washington. The Sawtooth Range is often considered Idaho's most famous mountain range. Other mountain ranges in Idaho include the Bitterroot Range, the White Cloud Mountains, the Lost River Range, the Clearwater Mountains, and the Salmon River Mountains. The only active glacier in Idaho is at Borah Peak.

Salmon-Challis National Forest is located in the east central sections of the state, with Salmon National Forest to the north and Challis National Forest to the south. The forest is in an area known as the Idaho Cobalt Belt, which consists of a 34 miles (55 km) long geological formation of sedimentary rock that contains some of the largest cobalt deposits in the U.S.

Idaho has two time zones, with the dividing line approximately midway between Canada and Nevada. Southern Idaho, including the Boise metropolitan area, Idaho Falls, Pocatello, and Twin Falls, are in the Mountain Time Zone. A legislative error (15 U.S.C. ch. 6 §264) theoretically placed this region in the Central Time Zone, but this was corrected with a 2007 amendment. Areas north of the Salmon River, including Coeur d'Alene, Moscow, Lewiston, and Sandpoint, are in the Pacific Time Zone, which contains less than a quarter of the state's population and land area.

== Climate ==
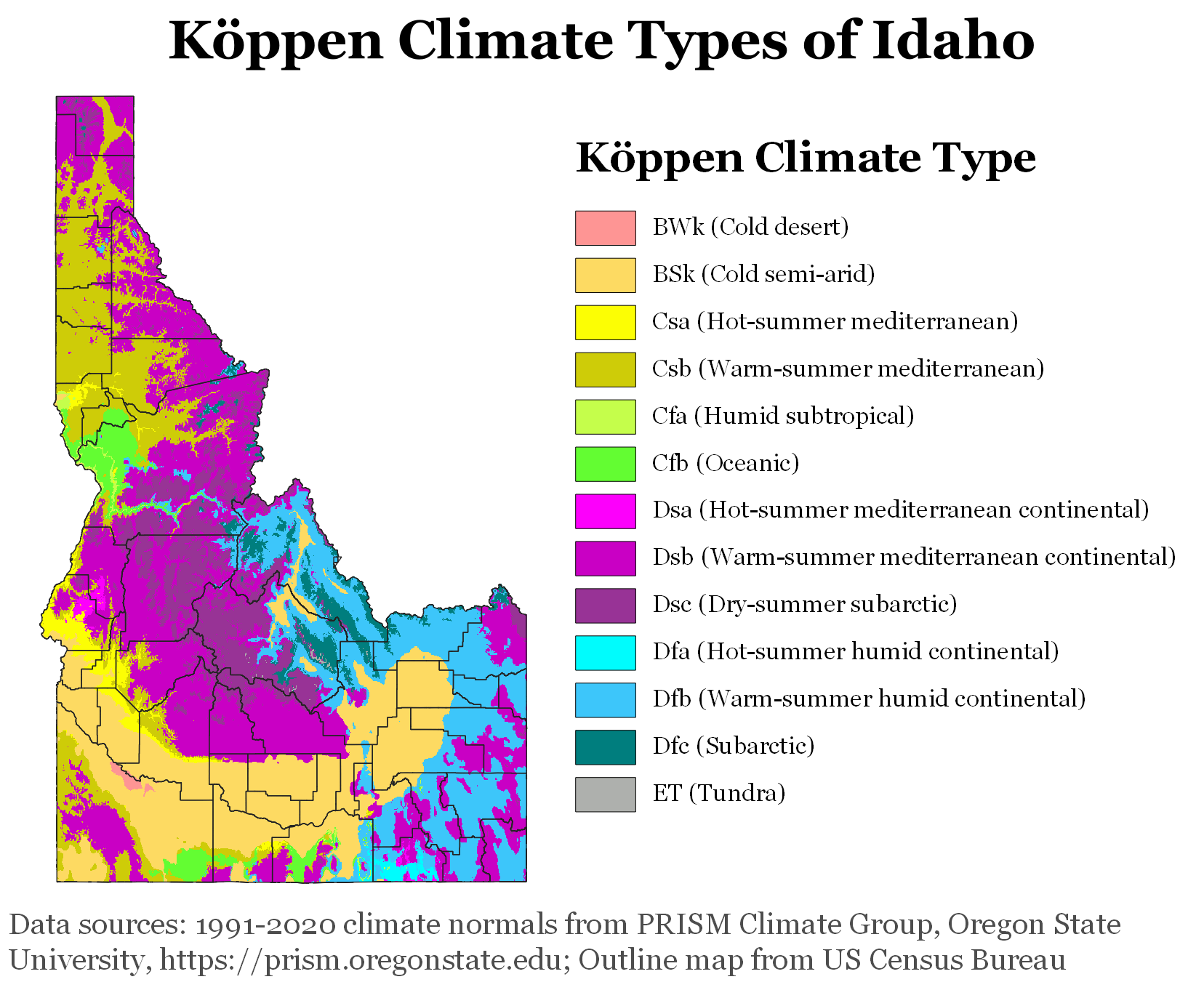
Köppen climate types of Idaho, using 1991-2020 climate normals.

Idaho's climate varies widely. Although the state's western border is about 330 miles (530 km) from the Pacific Ocean, the maritime influence is still felt in Idaho, especially in the winter when cloud cover, humidity, and precipitation are at their maximum extent. This influence has a moderating effect in the winter where temperatures are not as low as would otherwise be expected for a northern state with predominantly high elevations. In the panhandle, moist air masses from the coast are released as precipitation over the North Central Rockies forests, creating the North American inland temperate rainforest. The maritime influence is least prominent in the state's eastern part where the precipitation patterns are often reversed, with wetter summers and drier winters, and seasonal temperature differences are more extreme, showing a more semi-arid continental climate.

Idaho can be hot, although extended periods over 98 °F (37 °C) are rare, except for the lowest point in elevation, Lewiston, which correspondingly sees little snow. Boise receives around 18 inches (46 cm) of snow annually. Hot summer days are tempered by the low relative humidity and cooler evenings during summer months since, for most of the state, the highest diurnal difference in temperature is often in the summer. Winters can be cold, although extended periods of bitter cold weather below zero are unusual. Idaho's all-time highest temperature of 118 °F (48 °C) was recorded at Orofino on July 28, 1934; the all-time lowest temperature of −60 °F (−51 °C) was recorded at Island Park Dam on January 18, 1943.

=== Climate data ===
Monthly normal high and low temperatures for various Idaho cities. (°F)
| City | Jan | Feb | Mar | Apr | May | Jun | Jul | Aug | Sep | Oct | Nov | Dec |
| Boise | 38/24 | 45/27 | 55/33 | 62/38 | 72/46 | 81/53 | 91/59 | 90/59 | 79/50 | 65/40 | 48/31 | 38/23 |
| Lewiston | 42/30 | 47/31 | 55/36 | 62/41 | 71/47 | 79/54 | 89/60 | 89/60 | 78/51 | 63/41 | 48/34 | 40/28 |
| Pocatello | 33/16 | 38/19 | 49/27 | 59/33 | 68/40 | 78/46 | 88/52 | 88/51 | 76/42 | 62/33 | 45/24 | 33/16 |
| Orofino | 38/25 | 46/28 | 55/32 | 64/38 | 72/44 | 80/50 | 89/54 | 90/53 | 79/45 | 63/36 | 46/31 | 37/26 |

Climate data for Boise (Köppen BSk) (Note: Mean monthly maxima and minima (i.e. the highest and lowest temperature readings during an entire month or year) calculated based on data at said location from 1991 to 2020.) Extremes 1875–present. (Note: Official records have been kept at downtown Boise from January 1875 to December 1939, and at Boise Air Terminal (Airport) since January 1940. For more information, see ThreadEx.)
| Month | Jan | Feb | Mar | Apr | May | Jun | Jul | Aug | Sep | Oct | Nov | Dec | Year |
|---|---|---|---|---|---|---|---|---|---|---|---|---|---|
| Record high °F (°C) | 63 (17) | 71 (22) | 82 (28) | 92 (33) | 100 (38) | 110 (43) | 111 (44) | 110 (43) | 104 (40) | 94 (34) | 78 (26) | 70 (21) | 111 (44) |
| Mean maximum °F (°C) | 52.6 (11.4) | 59.5 (15.3) | 71.0 (21.7) | 80.7 (27.1) | 90.1 (32.3) | 98.3 (36.8) | 104.5 (40.3) | 102.2 (39.0) | 95.9 (35.5) | 83.9 (28.8) | 65.0 (18.3) | 54.5 (12.5) | 105.2 (40.7) |
| Mean daily maximum °F (°C) | 38.8 (3.8) | 46.0 (7.8) | 55.5 (13.1) | 62.3 (16.8) | 72.3 (22.4) | 81.4 (27.4) | 92.7 (33.7) | 90.7 (32.6) | 80.0 (26.7) | 64.8 (18.2) | 48.8 (9.3) | 38.8 (3.8) | 64.3 (17.9) |
| Daily mean °F (°C) | 32.2 (0.1) | 37.5 (3.1) | 45.2 (7.3) | 50.9 (10.5) | 59.9 (15.5) | 67.8 (19.9) | 77.3 (25.2) | 75.8 (24.3) | 66.3 (19.1) | 53.2 (11.8) | 40.3 (4.6) | 32.1 (0.1) | 53.2 (11.8) |
| Mean daily minimum °F (°C) | 25.5 (−3.6) | 29.0 (−1.7) | 34.9 (1.6) | 39.6 (4.2) | 47.5 (8.6) | 54.1 (12.3) | 61.9 (16.6) | 60.8 (16.0) | 52.6 (11.4) | 41.5 (5.3) | 31.7 (−0.2) | 25.4 (−3.7) | 42.0 (5.6) |
| Mean minimum °F (°C) | 10.0 (−12.2) | 15.8 (−9.0) | 22.8 (−5.1) | 27.5 (−2.5) | 33.0 (0.6) | 41.0 (5.0) | 50.4 (10.2) | 48.2 (9.0) | 38.4 (3.6) | 26.6 (−3.0) | 17.4 (−8.1) | 10.9 (−11.7) | 5.1 (−14.9) |
| Record low °F (°C) | −28 (−33) | −15 (−26) | 5 (−15) | 11 (−12) | 22 (−6) | 30 (−1) | 35 (2) | 32 (0) | 23 (−5) | 11 (−12) | −10 (−23) | −25 (−32) | −28 (−33) |
| Average precipitation inches (mm) | 1.41 (36) | 1.00 (25) | 1.33 (34) | 1.23 (31) | 1.45 (37) | 0.75 (19) | 0.21 (5.3) | 0.17 (4.3) | 0.43 (11) | 0.81 (21) | 1.18 (30) | 1.54 (39) | 11.51 (292) |
| Average snowfall inches (cm) | 5.3 (13) | 3.3 (8.4) | 1.2 (3.0) | 0.1 (0.25) | 0.0 (0.0) | 0.0 (0.0) | 0.0 (0.0) | 0.0 (0.0) | 0.0 (0.0) | 0.1 (0.25) | 2.0 (5.1) | 5.6 (14) | 17.6 (45) |
| Average precipitation days (≥ 0.01 in) | 11.1 | 9.1 | 10.1 | 9.2 | 8.4 | 5.3 | 2.3 | 2.1 | 3.9 | 6.0 | 9.7 | 12.0 | 89.2 |
| Average snowy days (≥ 0.1 in) | 5.2 | 3.3 | 1.6 | 0.3 | 0.0 | 0.0 | 0.0 | 0.0 | 0.0 | 0.1 | 2.2 | 5.5 | 18.2 |
| Average relative humidity (%) | 75.0 | 69.9 | 59.5 | 52.3 | 48.7 | 44.7 | 36.1 | 37.2 | 45.1 | 53.6 | 68.5 | 74.6 | 55.4 |
| Average dew point °F (°C) | 21.6 (−5.8) | 25.9 (−3.4) | 27.3 (−2.6) | 30.2 (−1.0) | 36.0 (2.2) | 41.4 (5.2) | 43.2 (6.2) | 42.3 (5.7) | 37.9 (3.3) | 32.7 (0.4) | 28.9 (−1.7) | 22.5 (−5.3) | 32.5 (0.3) |
| Mean monthly sunshine hours | 109.3 | 151.9 | 238.6 | 281.4 | 335.5 | 351.6 | 399.8 | 358.8 | 303.6 | 238.1 | 119.6 | 105.2 | 2,993.4 |
| Percentage possible sunshine | 38 | 52 | 64 | 70 | 74 | 76 | 86 | 83 | 81 | 70 | 41 | 38 | 67 |
Source: NOAA (relative humidity, dew point, and sun 1961–1990)

Climate data for Idaho (Köppen Dfb/BSk) (Note: 1991–2020 normals, extremes 1948–present)
| Month | Jan | Feb | Mar | Apr | May | Jun | Jul | Aug | Sep | Oct | Nov | Dec | Year |
|---|---|---|---|---|---|---|---|---|---|---|---|---|---|
| Record high °F (°C) | 57 (14) | 62 (17) | 73 (23) | 86 (30) | 94 (34) | 102 (39) | 101 (38) | 100 (38) | 100 (38) | 88 (31) | 71 (22) | 58 (14) | 102 (39) |
| Mean maximum °F (°C) | 42.3 (5.7) | 47.3 (8.5) | 64.3 (17.9) | 75.7 (24.3) | 84.2 (29.0) | 91.6 (33.1) | 97.0 (36.1) | 95.5 (35.3) | 89.8 (32.1) | 77.6 (25.3) | 61.6 (16.4) | 47.0 (8.3) | 95.7 (35.4) |
| Mean daily maximum °F (°C) | 28.7 (−1.8) | 34.2 (1.2) | 47.2 (8.4) | 57.5 (14.2) | 67.2 (19.6) | 76.2 (24.6) | 86.6 (30.3) | 85.6 (29.8) | 74.8 (23.8) | 59.1 (15.1) | 43.0 (6.1) | 30.3 (−0.9) | 57.5 (14.2) |
| Daily mean °F (°C) | 20.4 (−6.4) | 24.9 (−3.9) | 36.2 (2.3) | 44.4 (6.9) | 52.8 (11.6) | 60.4 (15.8) | 68.0 (20.0) | 66.5 (19.2) | 57.7 (14.3) | 45.0 (7.2) | 32.4 (0.2) | 21.9 (−5.6) | 44.2 (6.8) |
| Mean daily minimum °F (°C) | 12.1 (−11.1) | 15.7 (−9.1) | 25.3 (−3.7) | 31.4 (−0.3) | 38.4 (3.6) | 44.6 (7.0) | 49.3 (9.6) | 47.5 (8.6) | 40.6 (4.8) | 30.8 (−0.7) | 21.9 (−5.6) | 13.4 (−10.3) | 30.9 (−0.6) |
| Mean minimum °F (°C) | −10.4 (−23.6) | −4.3 (−20.2) | 7.6 (−13.6) | 19.2 (−7.1) | 25.4 (−3.7) | 33.5 (0.8) | 40.8 (4.9) | 37.5 (3.1) | 29.0 (−1.7) | 16.1 (−8.8) | 3.9 (−15.6) | −9.2 (−22.9) | −14.6 (−25.9) |
| Record low °F (°C) | −33 (−36) | −38 (−39) | −16 (−27) | 13 (−11) | 17 (−8) | 29 (−2) | 33 (1) | 28 (−2) | 18 (−8) | −3 (−19) | −19 (−28) | −31 (−35) | −38 (−39) |
| Average precipitation inches (mm) | 0.67 (17) | 0.56 (14) | 0.81 (21) | 1.03 (26) | 1.57 (40) | 1.09 (28) | 0.46 (12) | 0.59 (15) | 0.97 (25) | 0.88 (22) | 0.66 (17) | 0.78 (20) | 10.07 (257) |
| Average snowfall inches (cm) | 5.8 (15) | 6.5 (17) | 3.5 (8.9) | 2.3 (5.8) | 0.6 (1.5) | 0.0 (0.0) | 0.0 (0.0) | 0.0 (0.0) | 0.0 (0.0) | 0.8 (2.0) | 7.2 (18) | 9.9 (25) | 36.6 (93.2) |
| Average precipitation days (≥ 0.01 in) | 8.2 | 7.0 | 7.6 | 8.7 | 9.0 | 6.8 | 3.8 | 4.9 | 5.1 | 6.5 | 7.2 | 9.5 | 84.3 |
| Average snowy days (≥ 0.1 in) | 7.7 | 7.4 | 3.8 | 2.1 | 0.8 | 0.0 | 0.0 | 0.0 | 0.0 | 0.6 | 7.5 | 8.7 | 38.6 |
Source 1: National Weather Service
Source 2: NOAA (average snowfall/snowy days 1981-2010)

Climate data for Lewiston (Köppen BSk) (Note: Mean monthly maxima and minima (i.e. the highest and lowest temperature readings during an entire month or year) calculated based on data at said location from 1991 to 2020.) Extremes 1881−present.
| Month | Jan | Feb | Mar | Apr | May | Jun | Jul | Aug | Sep | Oct | Nov | Dec | Year |
|---|---|---|---|---|---|---|---|---|---|---|---|---|---|
| Record high °F (°C) | 66 (19) | 72 (22) | 80 (27) | 98 (37) | 104 (40) | 115 (46) | 117 (47) | 115 (46) | 108 (42) | 94 (34) | 77 (25) | 67 (19) | 117 (47) |
| Mean maximum °F (°C) | 55.6 (13.1) | 59.8 (15.4) | 69.0 (20.6) | 79.7 (26.5) | 89.8 (32.1) | 96.2 (35.7) | 103.4 (39.7) | 102.9 (39.4) | 94.3 (34.6) | 80.3 (26.8) | 62.8 (17.1) | 54.7 (12.6) | 105.1 (40.6) |
| Mean daily maximum °F (°C) | 42.1 (5.6) | 47.0 (8.3) | 55.1 (12.8) | 62.3 (16.8) | 72.0 (22.2) | 79.0 (26.1) | 90.8 (32.7) | 90.1 (32.3) | 79.5 (26.4) | 63.0 (17.2) | 48.7 (9.3) | 40.8 (4.9) | 64.2 (17.9) |
| Daily mean °F (°C) | 36.2 (2.3) | 39.5 (4.2) | 45.4 (7.4) | 51.5 (10.8) | 60.1 (15.6) | 66.5 (19.2) | 75.9 (24.4) | 75.2 (24.0) | 65.9 (18.8) | 52.5 (11.4) | 41.6 (5.3) | 35.2 (1.8) | 53.8 (12.1) |
| Mean daily minimum °F (°C) | 30.3 (−0.9) | 31.7 (−0.2) | 35.7 (2.1) | 40.7 (4.8) | 48.1 (8.9) | 54.0 (12.2) | 60.9 (16.1) | 60.3 (15.7) | 52.3 (11.3) | 42.0 (5.6) | 34.5 (1.4) | 29.5 (−1.4) | 43.3 (6.3) |
| Mean minimum °F (°C) | 14.6 (−9.7) | 17.1 (−8.3) | 25.5 (−3.6) | 30.7 (−0.7) | 35.7 (2.1) | 43.8 (6.6) | 49.9 (9.9) | 49.6 (9.8) | 39.9 (4.4) | 28.5 (−1.9) | 20.8 (−6.2) | 12.7 (−10.7) | 12.7 (−10.7) |
| Record low °F (°C) | −22 (−30) | −18 (−28) | 2 (−17) | 20 (−7) | 23 (−5) | 34 (1) | 41 (5) | 41 (5) | 27 (−3) | 15 (−9) | −3 (−19) | −23 (−31) | −23 (−31) |
| Average precipitation inches (mm) | 1.13 (29) | 1.04 (26) | 1.30 (33) | 1.44 (37) | 1.69 (43) | 1.25 (32) | 0.47 (12) | 0.51 (13) | 0.60 (15) | 1.08 (27) | 1.23 (31) | 1.13 (29) | 12.87 (327) |
| Average snowfall inches (cm) | 2.7 (6.9) | 3.8 (9.7) | 0.8 (2.0) | 0.0 (0.0) | 0.0 (0.0) | 0.0 (0.0) | 0.0 (0.0) | 0.0 (0.0) | 0.0 (0.0) | 0.0 (0.0) | 1.3 (3.3) | 4.1 (10) | 12.7 (31.9) |
| Average precipitation days (≥ 0.01 in) | 11.2 | 9.6 | 11.7 | 11.3 | 10.6 | 8.9 | 3.9 | 3.4 | 4.7 | 8.7 | 11.1 | 11.1 | 106.2 |
| Average snowy days (≥ 0.1 in) | 2.3 | 3.1 | 1.0 | 0.0 | 0.0 | 0.0 | 0.0 | 0.0 | 0.0 | 0.0 | 1.0 | 3.6 | 11.0 |
Source 1: NOAA
Source 2: National Weather Service

== Lakes and rivers ==
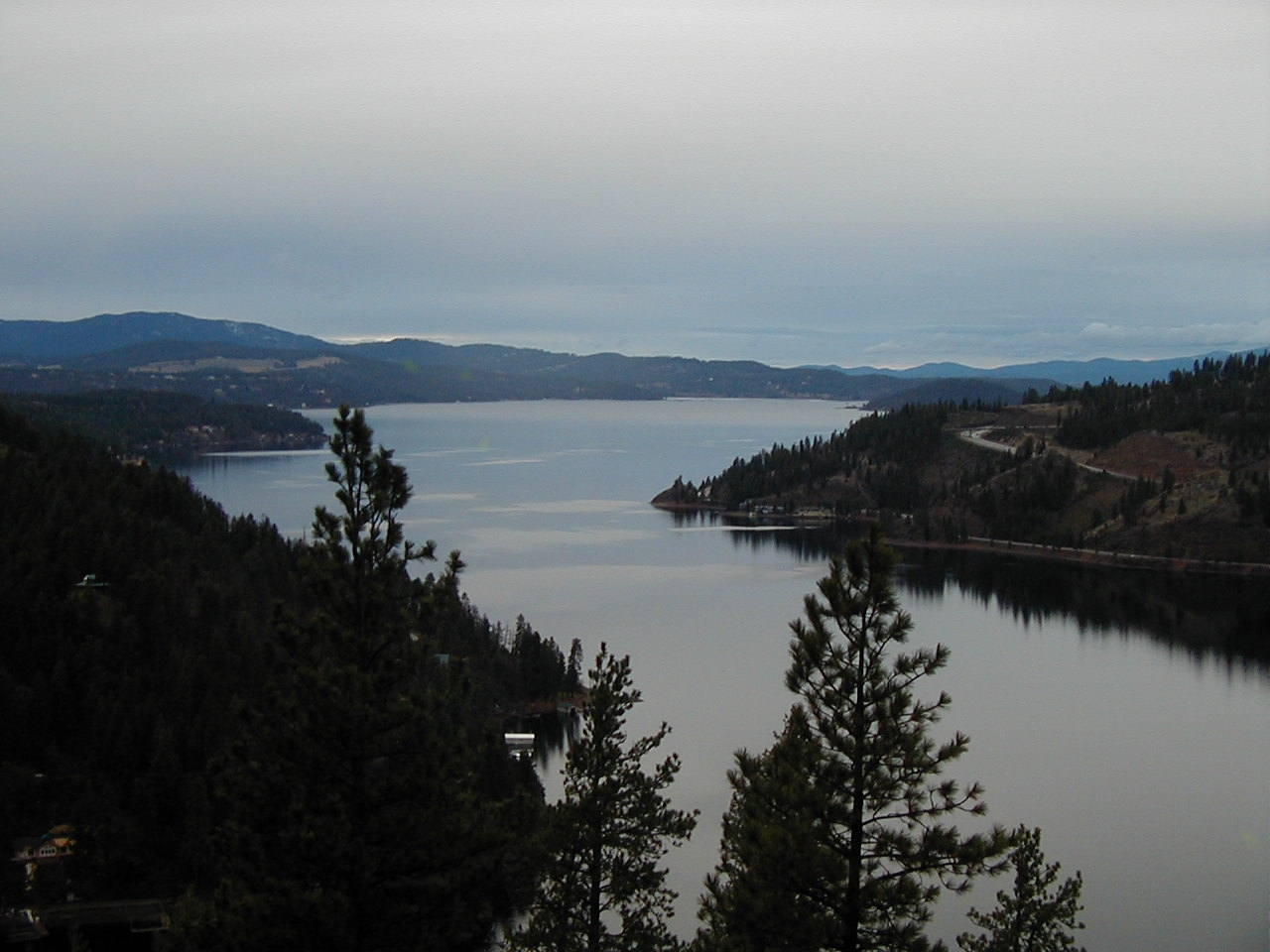
Lake Coeur d'Alene in North Idaho

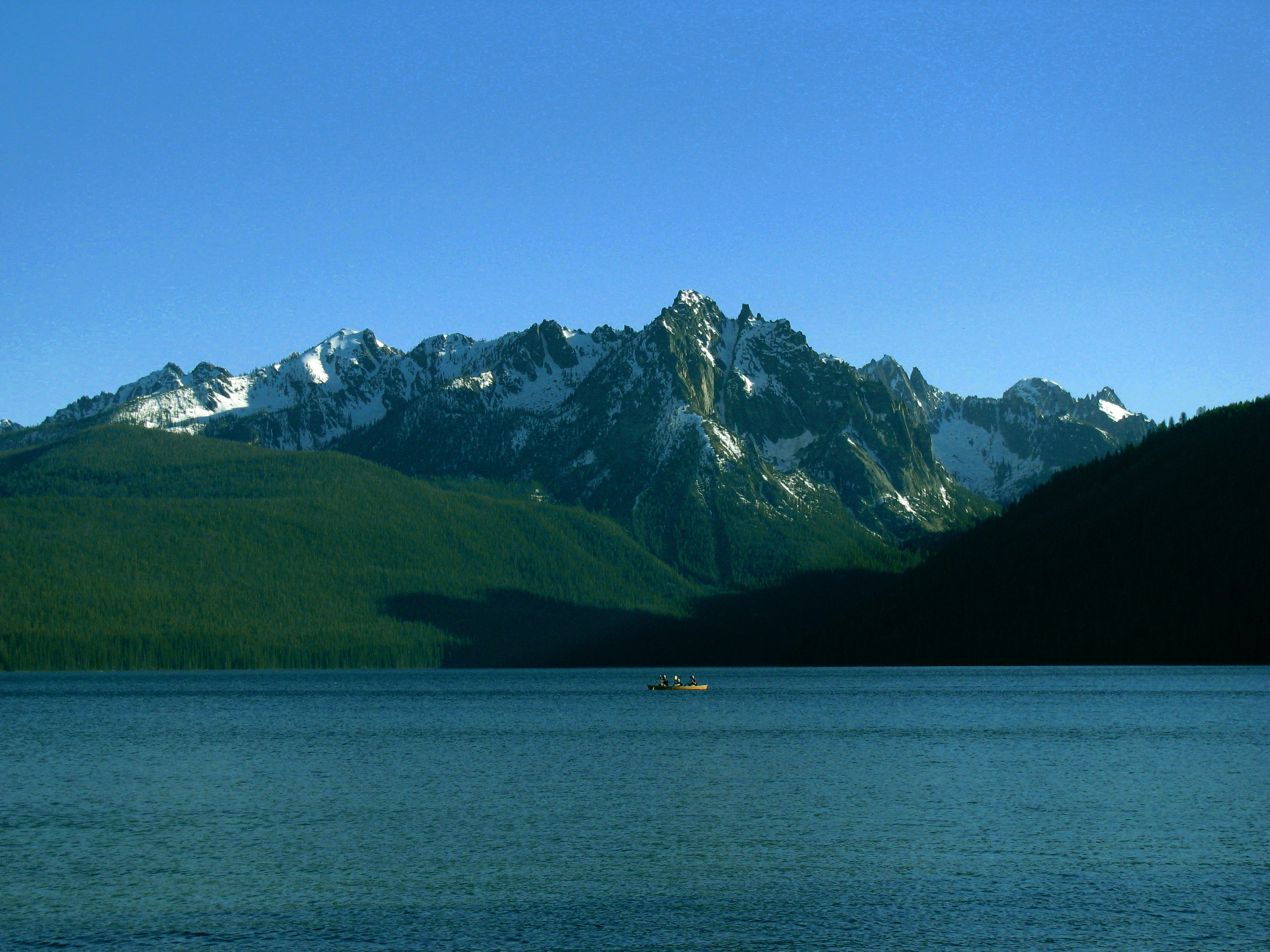
Redfish Lake in central Idaho

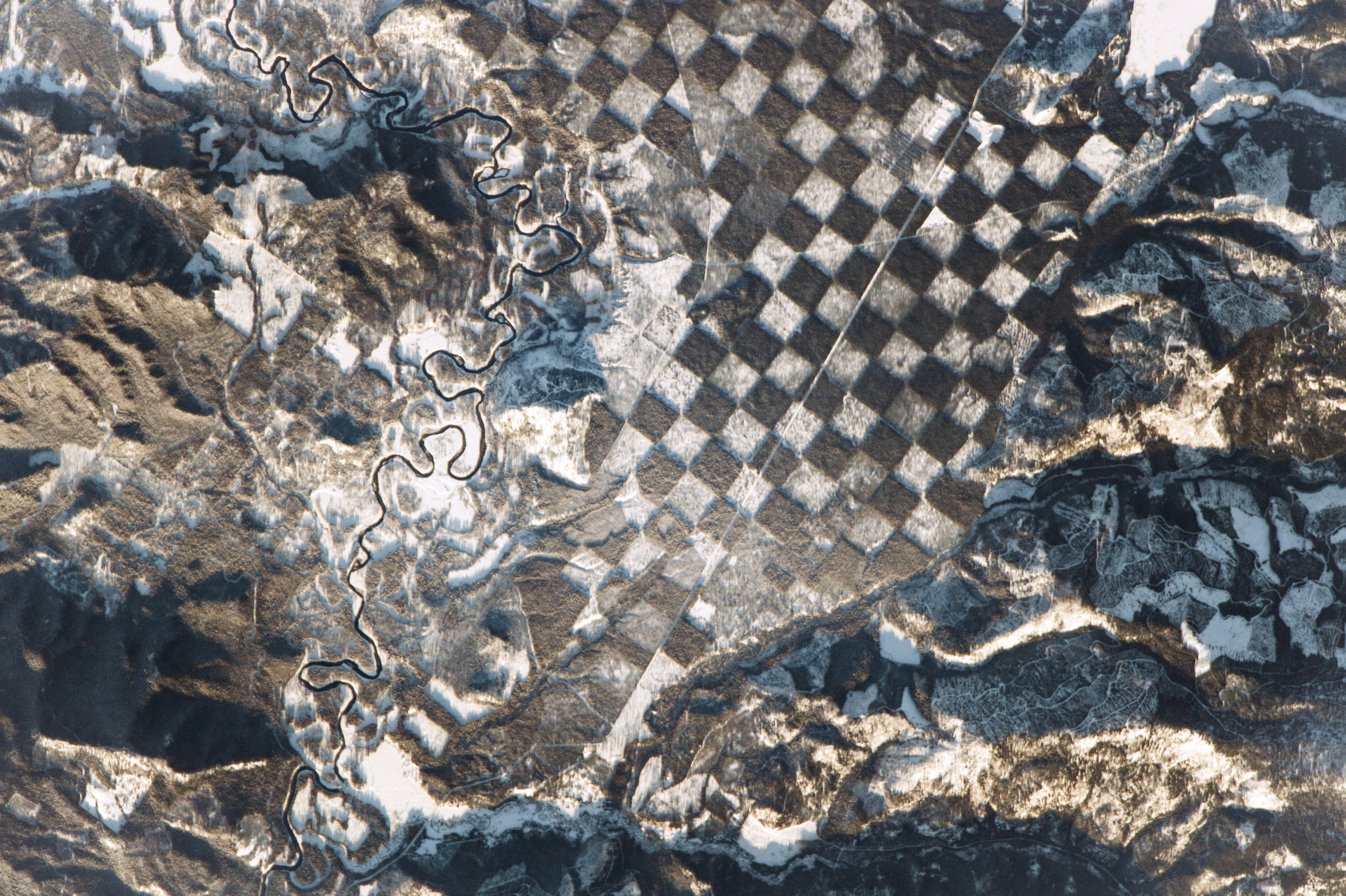
Priest River winding through Whitetail Butte

- Clark Fork River
- Alturas Lake
- Bear River
- Bear Lake (Idaho–Utah)
- Boise River
- Clearwater River
- Hayden Lake
- Henry's Lake
- Kootenai River
- Lake Cascade
- Lake Cleveland
- Lake Coeur d'Alene
- Lake Lowell
- Lake Walcott
- Pend Oreille - Largest in Idaho
- Little Redfish Lake
- Lucky Peak Lake
- Moyie River
- North Fork Clearwater River
- Pack River
- Payette Lake, (McCall)
- Pettit Lake
- Priest Lake
- Perkins Lake
- Portneuf River
- Redfish Lake
- Sawtooth Lake
- Snake River - Longest
- Stanley Lake
- St. Joe River
- Warm Lake

== Protected areas ==
As of 2018:

=== National parks, reserves, monuments and historic sites ===
- Salmon-Challis National Forest
- California National Historic Trail
- City of Rocks National Reserve
- Craters of the Moon National Monument and Preserve
- Hagerman Fossil Beds National Monument
- Lewis and Clark National Historic Trail
- Minidoka National Historic Site
- Nez Perce National Historical Park
- Oregon National Historic Trail
- Yellowstone National Park
- Pacific Northwest National Scenic Trail

=== National recreation areas ===
- Hells Canyon National Recreation Area
- Sawtooth National Recreation Area

=== National wildlife refuges and Wilderness Areas ===
- Bear Lake National Wildlife Refuge
- Camas National Wildlife Refuge
- Deer Flat National Wildlife Refuge
- Frank Church—River of No Return Wilderness Area
- Grays Lake National Wildlife Refuge
- Kootenai National Wildlife Refuge
- Minidoka National Wildlife Refuge

=== National conservation areas ===
- Snake River Birds of Prey National Conservation Area

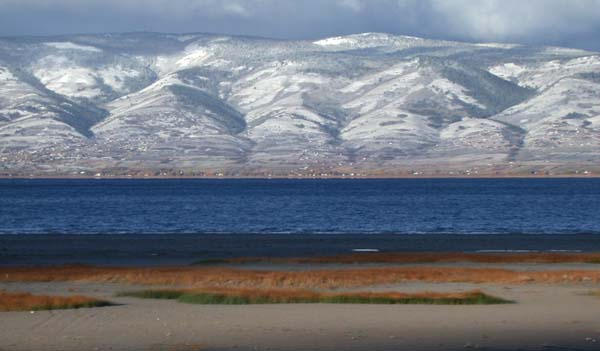
Bear Lake viewed from Bear Lake State Park

=== State parks ===
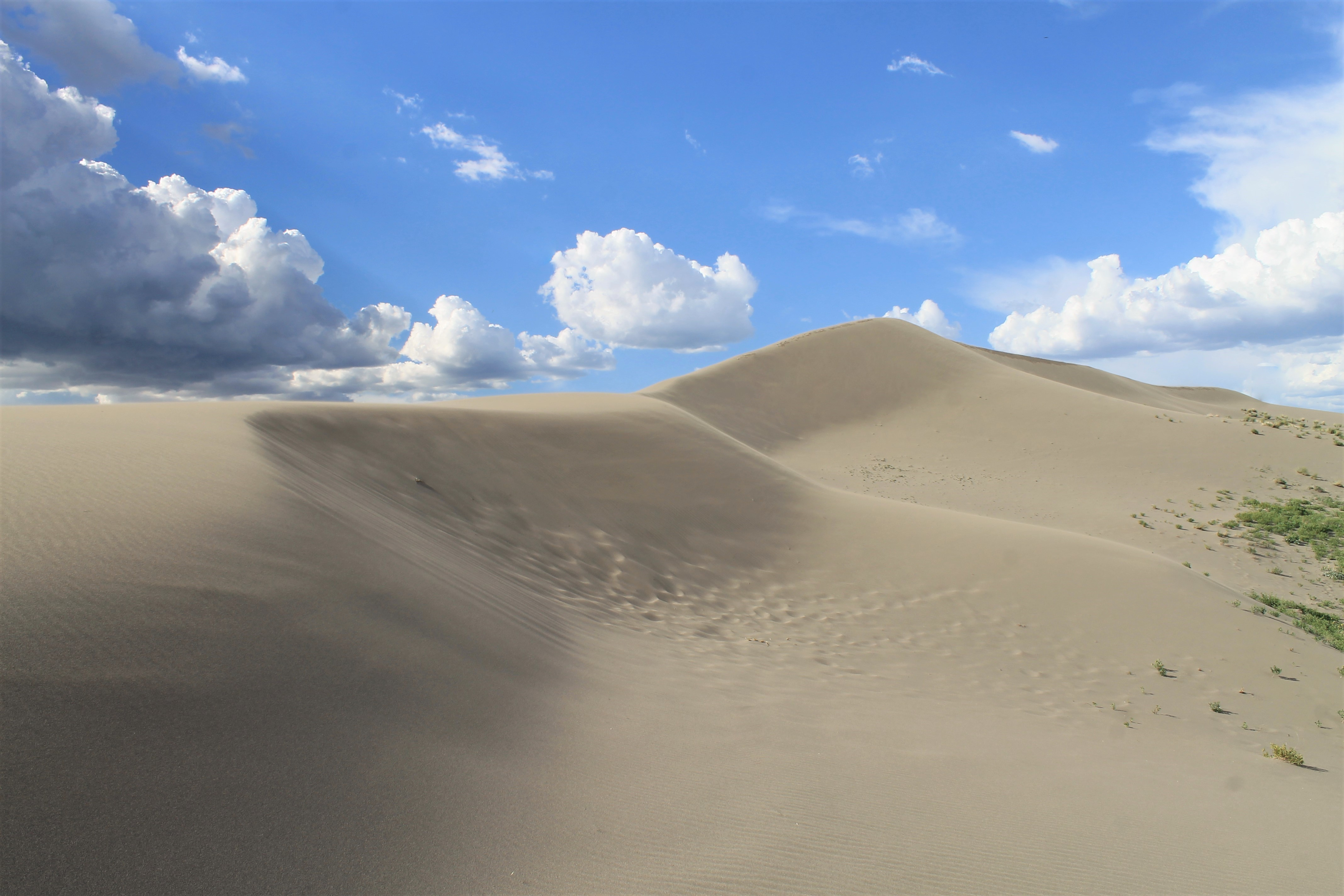
Bruneau Dunes State Park

- Bear Lake State Park
- Bruneau Dunes State Park
- Castle Rocks State Park
- City of Rocks National Reserve
- Coeur d'Alene Parkway State Park
- Dworshak State Park
- Eagle Island State Park
- Farragut State Park
- Harriman State Park
- Hells Gate State Park
- Henrys Lake State Park
- Heyburn State Park
- Lake Cascade State Park
- Lake Walcott State Park
- Land of the Yankee Fork State Park
- Lucky Peak State Park
- Massacre Rocks State Park
- McCroskey State Park
- Old Mission State Park
- Ponderosa State Park
- Priest Lake State Park
- Round Lake State Park
- Thousand Springs State Park
- Three Island Crossing State Park
- Trail of the Coeur d'Alenes
- Winchester Lake State Park

== See also ==
- Climate of Oregon
- Geography of Montana
