= Ashton to Tetonia Trail =

Protected area in Idaho, US

Coordinates: 44°04′18″N 111°26′54″W

- Length: 29.6 miles (47.6 km)
- Location: Eastern Idaho, United States
- Established: 2010
- Designation: Idaho state park
- Trailheads: Ashton, Marysville, Bitch Creek, Felt, Tetonia
- Use: Hiking, biking, horseback riding, cross-country skiing, snowshoeing, snowmobiling
- Elevation change: 787 feet (240 m)
- Highest point: 6,064 ft (1,850 m) (Tetonia)
- Lowest point: 5,277 ft (1,610 m) (Ashton)
- Season: Year-round
- Sights: Teton Valley, Teton Mountains, trestle bridges at Fall River, Conant Creek, Bitch Creek
- Surface: Gravel rail bed
- Maintained by: Idaho Department of Parks and Recreation
- Website: Ashton to Tetonia Trail

Trail map
- Location of east and west trailheads in Idaho

The Ashton to Tetonia Trail is a 29.6-mile (47.6 km) rail-trail conversion built on the former Teton Valley Branch of the Union Pacific Railroad from Ashton to Tetonia, Idaho. The trail is used for hiking, biking, horseback riding, cross-country skiing, snowshoeing, and snowmobiling. Access points are found at Ashton, Marysville, Bitch Creek, Felt, and Tetonia. It is managed through Harriman State Park under administration by the Idaho Department of Parks and Recreation.

The trail crosses Conant Creek at the Conant Creek Pegram Truss Railroad Bridge, a former railroad bridge built in 1911, which is listed on the National Register of Historic Places.

== History ==
The trail occupies a portion of the former Teton Valley Branch of the Union Pacific Railroad. The original 46-mile (74 km) line was constructed from 1910, beginning in Ashton, to 1912, when it was finished in Victor. The Ashton-Tetonia Trail opened to public in 2010 and spans about two-thirds of the length of the original line.

== See also ==
- List of Idaho state parks
- National Parks in Idaho
