= Round Lake State Park =

State park in Idaho, United States

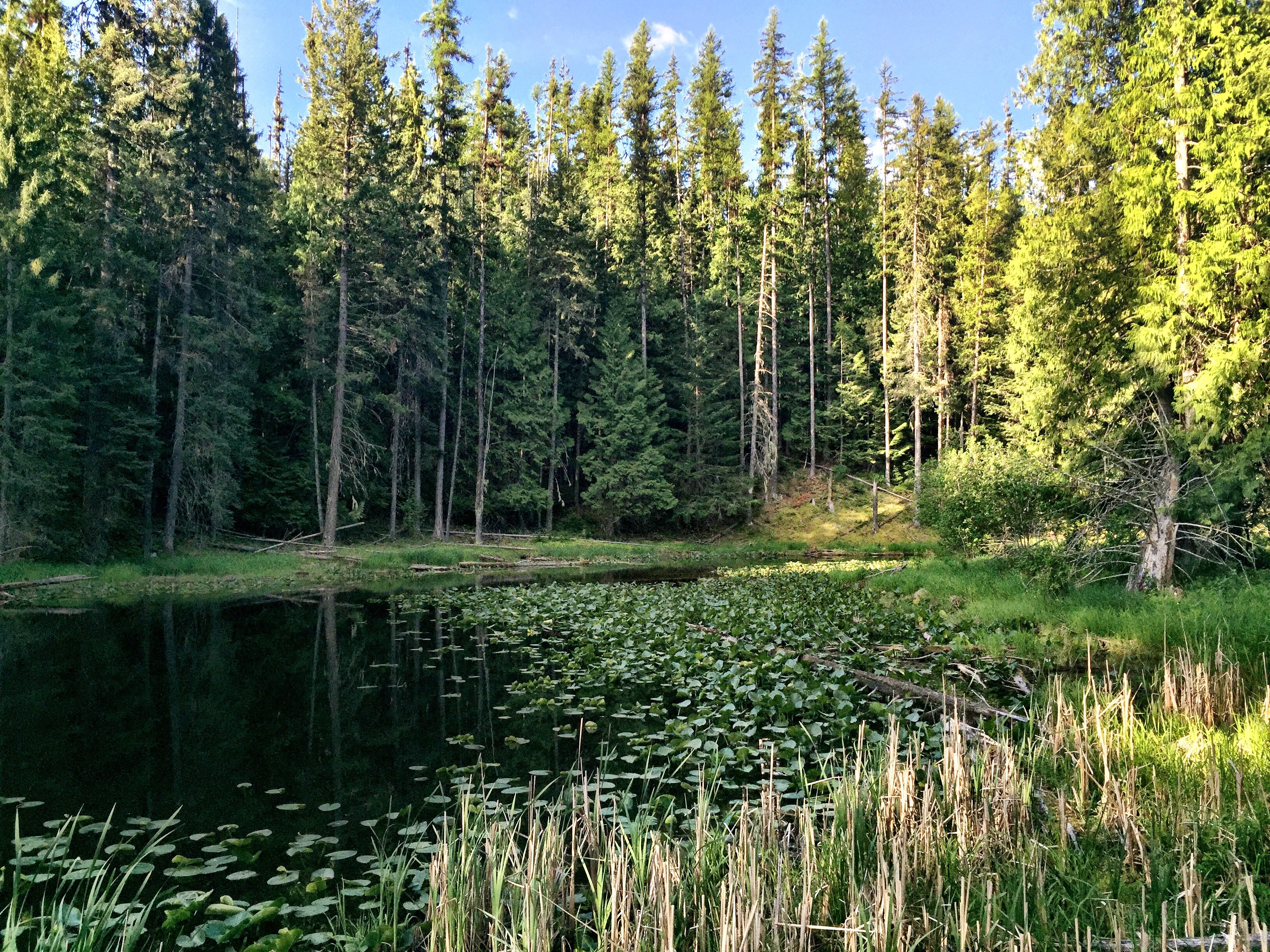
- Round Lake State Park, May 2015

- Location within Idaho Location within the United States
- Location: Bonner County, Idaho, United States
- Nearest city: Sandpoint, Idaho
- Coordinates: 48°10′01″N 116°38′12″W
- Area: 142 acres (57 ha)
- Elevation: 2,122 ft (647 m)
- Established: 1965
- Administrator: Idaho Department of Parks and Recreation
- Website: Official website

Round Lake State Park is a public recreation area located four miles (6.4 km) southwest of Sagle in Bonner County, Idaho. The 142-acre (57 ha) state park surrounds 55-acre (22 ha) Round Lake. The lake was formed from glacial activity in the Pleistocene. The park offers campsites, fishing, swimming, boating for non-motor and electric-powered watercraft, and trails for hiking, biking and skiing.

== Wildlife ==
This state park is home to black bear, moose, grizzly bear, waterfowl, beaver, various songbirds, and deer.

== See also ==
- List of Idaho state parks
- National Parks in Idaho
