= Lake Cascade State Park =

State park in Idaho, United States

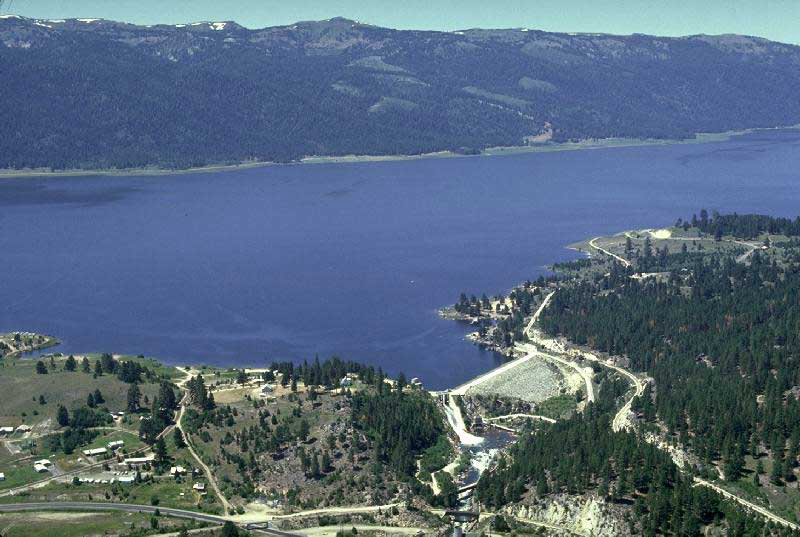
- Lake Cascade

- Location within Idaho Location within the United States
- Location: Valley County, Idaho, United States
- Nearest city: Cascade, Idaho
- Coordinates: 44°30′28″N 116°01′49″W
- Area: 500 acres (200 ha)
- Elevation: 4,828 ft (1,472 m)
- Established: 1999
- Administrator: Idaho Department of Parks and Recreation
- Website: Official website

Lake Cascade State Park is a public recreation area consisting of multiple units totaling 500 acres (200 ha) around Lake Cascade, an impoundment of the North Fork of the Payette River that covers 27,000 acres (11,000 ha) in Valley County, Idaho, United States. The state park includes 279 individual campsites in 10 developed campgrounds, six boat ramps, and opportunities for hiking, fishing, ice fishing, skiing, and bird watching.

== Wildlife ==
This state park is home to waterfowl, deer, rainbow trout, raccoon, eagles, black bear, owls, fox, songbirds, badger, coho salmon, elk, cougar, hawks, smallmouth bass, perch, and skunk.

== See also ==
- List of Idaho state parks
- National Parks in Idaho
