= Bear Lake State Park (Idaho) =

State park in Bear Lake County, Idaho, United States

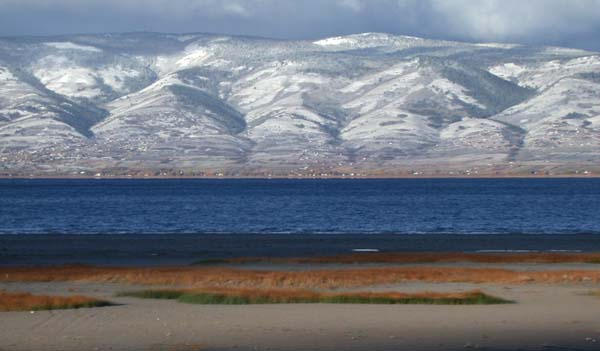
- Bear Lake seen from the park

- Location within Idaho Location within the United States
- Interactive map of Bear Lake State Park
- Location: Bear Lake County, Idaho, United States
- Nearest city: St. Charles, Idaho
- Coordinates: 42°01′45″N 111°15′28″W
- Area: 966 acres (391 ha)
- Elevation: 5,900 ft (1,800 m)
- Established: 1969
- Administrator: Idaho Department of Parks and Recreation
- Visitors: 162,787 (in 2014-2015) (expressed as Total Visitor Days)
- Website: Official website

Bear Lake State Park (sometimes called North Beach State Park) is a public recreation area bordering the north and eastern shores of Bear Lake in the southeast corner of Bear Lake County, Idaho, near the Utah and Wyoming state lines. The state park sits across the lake from St. Charles and is fifteen miles (24 km) south of Montpelier. Bear Lake National Wildlife Refuge lies adjacent to the park's north unit.

== History ==
The state purchased land for the park in 1969 using funds supplied through the Recreation and Public Purposes Act. At the same time, the North Beach unit was leased from Utah Power and Light. Management of the north unit continues under lease from PacifiCorp.

== Wildlife ==
This state park is home to Bonneville cisco, cutthroat trout, moose, pelicans, lake trout, deer, cranes and cougar.

== Features ==
Bear Lake owes its turquoise blue color to the presence of suspended calcium carbonate (limestone). The park's two units each have a beach over one mile (1.6 km) in length with gradually sloping lake bottom and large swimming area. Camping is offered in the east unit. In winter, the park provides ice fishing access for the annual runs of Bonneville cisco.

== Climate ==
According to the Köppen Climate Classification system, Bear Lake State Park has a warm-summer humid continental climate, abbreviated "Dfb" on climate maps. The hottest temperature recorded in Bear Lake State Park was 99 °F (37.2 °C) on July 27–28, 1931, while the coldest temperature recorded was −41 °F (−40.6 °C) on February 1, 1985.

Climate data for Bear Lake State Park (Lifton Pumping Station), Idaho, 1991–2020 normals, extremes 1919–present
Month	Jan	Feb	Mar	Apr	May	Jun	Jul	Aug	Sep	Oct	Nov	Dec	Year
Record high °F (°C)	52 (11)	55 (13)	69 (21)	77 (25)	90 (32)	94 (34)	99 (37)	96 (36)	91 (33)	81 (27)	66 (19)	60 (16)	99 (37)
Mean maximum °F (°C)	43.6 (6.4)	47.3 (8.5)	55.5 (13.1)	68.4 (20.2)	77.6 (25.3)	85.3 (29.6)	90.7 (32.6)	89.7 (32.1)	83.8 (28.8)	72.5 (22.5)	57.7 (14.3)	47.2 (8.4)	91.5 (33.1)
Mean daily maximum °F (°C)	28.7 (−1.8)	31.4 (−0.3)	40.4 (4.7)	50.4 (10.2)	60.5 (15.8)	71.3 (21.8)	81.0 (27.2)	79.9 (26.6)	70.0 (21.1)	55.8 (13.2)	40.8 (4.9)	30.4 (−0.9)	53.4 (11.9)
Daily mean °F (°C)	18.1 (−7.7)	19.6 (−6.9)	29.1 (−1.6)	39.5 (4.2)	49.2 (9.6)	58.1 (14.5)	66.0 (18.9)	63.9 (17.7)	54.6 (12.6)	42.7 (5.9)	30.5 (−0.8)	20.4 (−6.4)	41.0 (5.0)
Mean daily minimum °F (°C)	7.5 (−13.6)	7.8 (−13.4)	17.8 (−7.9)	28.6 (−1.9)	37.8 (3.2)	44.9 (7.2)	51.0 (10.6)	48.0 (8.9)	39.2 (4.0)	29.7 (−1.3)	20.1 (−6.6)	10.4 (−12.0)	28.6 (−1.9)
Mean minimum °F (°C)	−10.4 (−23.6)	−11.2 (−24.0)	−1.7 (−18.7)	18.0 (−7.8)	27.2 (−2.7)	35.4 (1.9)	43.4 (6.3)	39.1 (3.9)	29.0 (−1.7)	17.8 (−7.9)	4.5 (−15.3)	−7.0 (−21.7)	−15.3 (−26.3)
Record low °F (°C)	−40 (−40)	−41 (−41)	−29 (−34)	−11 (−24)	19 (−7)	26 (−3)	29 (−2)	30 (−1)	14 (−10)	−5 (−21)	−18 (−28)	−33 (−36)	−41 (−41)
Average precipitation inches (mm)	0.80 (20)	0.82 (21)	0.83 (21)	1.09 (28)	1.80 (46)	0.92 (23)	0.57 (14)	0.76 (19)	1.09 (28)	1.10 (28)	0.76 (19)	0.75 (19)	11.29 (286)
Average snowfall inches (cm)	9.1 (23)	8.8 (22)	4.1 (10)	2.7 (6.9)	0.2 (0.51)	0.0 (0.0)	0.0 (0.0)	0.0 (0.0)	0.1 (0.25)	1.1 (2.8)	4.1 (10)	7.2 (18)	37.4 (93.46)
Average precipitation days (≥ 0.01 in)	8.2	8.5	8.5	9.0	10.0	6.3	4.1	5.1	6.3	7.1	7.8	8.0	88.9
Average snowy days (≥ 0.1 in)	5.5	5.1	3.1	1.3	0.2	0.0	0.0	0.0	0.1	0.9	2.6	4.5	23.3
Source 1: NOAA
Source 2: National Weather Service

== See also ==
- List of Idaho state parks
- National Parks in Idaho
