= Hells Gate State Park =

State park in Idaho, United States

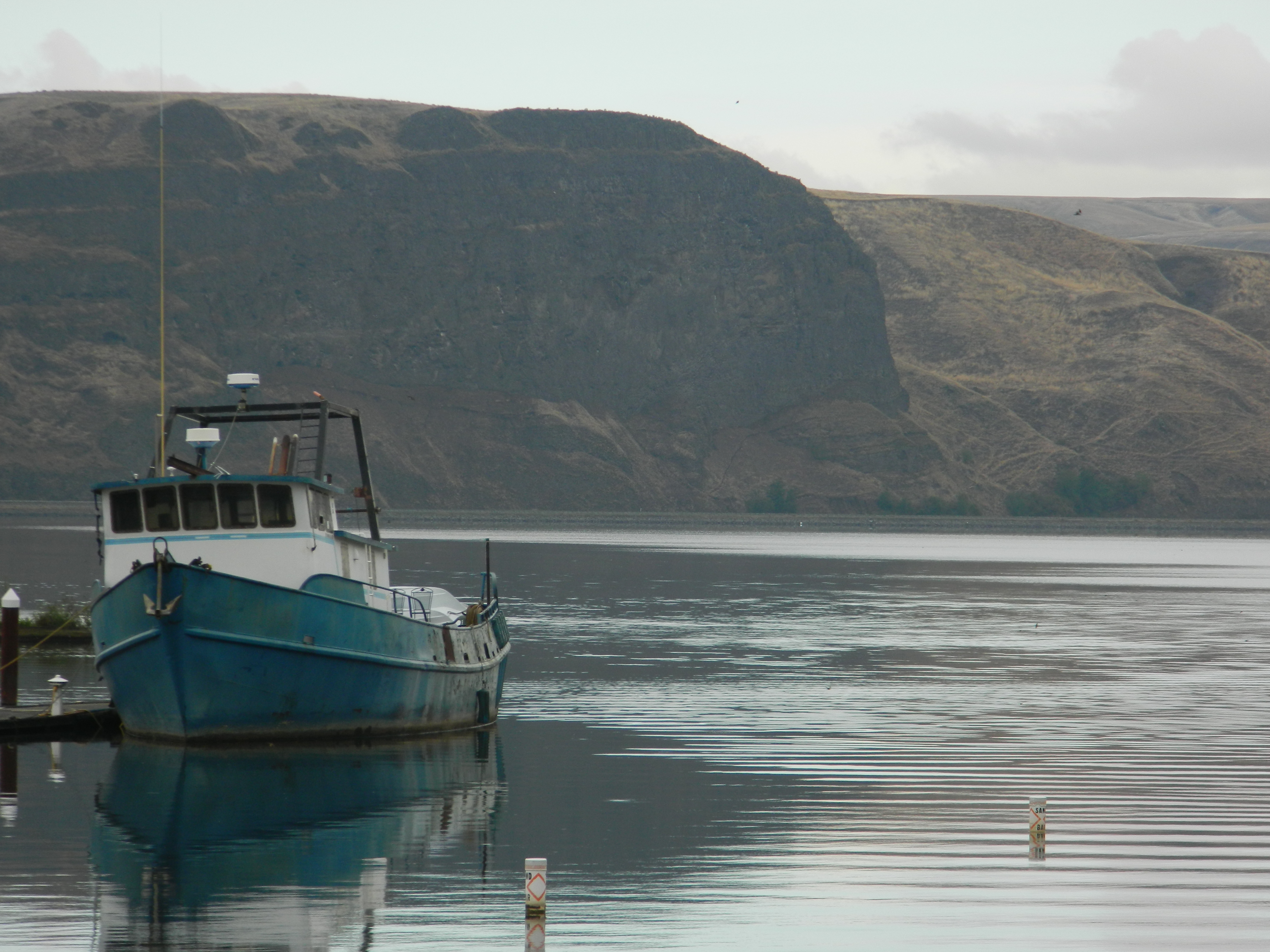
- Tugboat moored in Hells Gate State Park

- Location within Idaho Location within the United States
- Location: Nez Perce County, Idaho, United States
- Nearest city: Lewiston, Idaho
- Coordinates: 46°22′09″N 117°03′16″W
- Area: 960 acres (390 ha)
- Elevation: 733 ft (223 m)
- Established: 1973
- Administrator: Idaho Department of Parks and Recreation
- Website: Official website

Hells Gate State Park is a public recreation area located on the southern edge of Lewiston, Idaho, at the Snake River's downstream entrance to Hells Canyon, the deepest canyon in North America. The state park was created by the U.S. Army Corps of Engineers to mitigate the construction of the Lower Granite Dam; the Idaho Department of Parks and Recreation began leasing the site in 1973. The park's 960 acres (390 ha) offer trails in for hiking, mountain biking, and horseback riding as well as opportunities for camping, picnicing, fishing, boating, swimming, and taking jet boat trips into the canyon. The park sits at the lowest elevation of any Idaho state park, at 733 feet (223 m) above sea level.

== See also ==
- List of Idaho state parks
- National Parks in Idaho
