= Priest Lake State Park =

State park in Idaho, United States

- Location within Idaho Location within the United States
- Location: Bonner County, Idaho, United States
- Nearest city: Priest River, Idaho
- Coordinates: 48.6177°N 116.8291°W
- Area: 755 acres (306 ha)
- Elevation: 2,440 ft (740 m)
- Established: 1973
- Administrator: Idaho Department of Parks and Recreation
- Website: Official website

Priest Lake State Park is a public recreation area in Bonner County, Idaho, United States. The state park covers a total of 755 acres (306 ha) in the Selkirk Mountains about 30 miles (48 km) from the Canada–United States border. It consists of three units near the southern, eastern and northern shores of Priest Lake: Dickensheet, Indian Creek, and Lionhead.

== See also ==
- List of Idaho state parks
- National Parks in Idaho
