= Eagle Island State Park (Idaho) =

State park in Idaho, United States

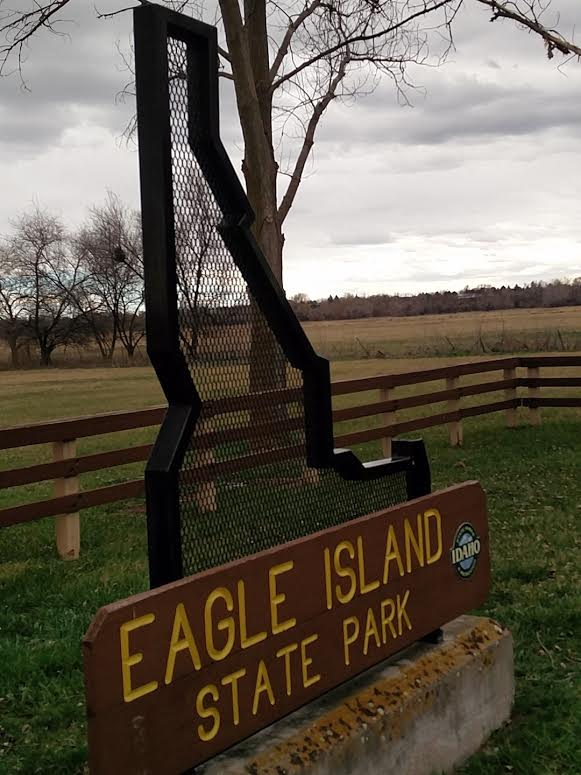

- Location within Idaho Location within the United States
- Location: Eagle, Idaho, United States
- Coordinates: 43°41′09″N 116°23′53″W
- Area: 545 acres (221 ha)
- Elevation: 2,524 ft (769 m)
- Established: 1978
- Administrator: Idaho Department of Parks and Recreation
- Website: Official website

Eagle Island State Park is a public recreation area on the southwest outskirts of the city of Eagle, Idaho. The state park covers 545 acres (221 ha) that are bordered by the north and south channels of the Boise River. The park's recreational facilities include swimming beach, picnic area, and equestrian and hiking trails.

== History ==
The grazing land where the park stands was purchased by the state in 1929 and used as a penitentiary farm until 1977, when the site was turned over to the Idaho Department of Lands. In 1978, the property was transferred to the Idaho Department of Parks and Recreation for a state park. In response to a poll concerning disposition of the land in the local newspaper, the Land Board voted to set aside the property to be managed as Eagle Island State Park. The park was dedicated in 1983.

The park also included a water slide. It was removed in 2024 due to equipment failure.

== Activities and amenities ==
The park offers a snow tubing hill that run typically from Thanksgiving to April 1 with skiing and snowboarding as well. The park in the summer has more than 5 miles (8.0 km) of equestrian trails, non-motorized boating, horseshoes, picnicking, swimming, volleyball, fishing, and disc golf course.

== See also ==
- List of Idaho state parks
- National Parks in Idaho
