= Henrys Lake State Park =

Public recreation area in Idaho, U.S.

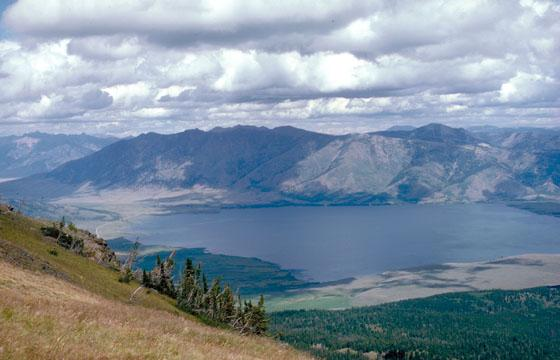
- Henrys Lake

- Location within Idaho Location within the United States
- Location: Fremont County, Idaho, United States
- Nearest city: Island Park, Idaho
- Coordinates: 44°36′59″N 111°22′04″W
- Area: 585 acres (237 ha)
- Elevation: 6,470 ft (1,970 m)
- Established: 1973
- Administrator: Idaho Department of Parks and Recreation
- Website: Official website

Henrys Lake State Park is a public recreation area located on the south shore on Henrys Lake thirteen miles (21 km) north of Island Park in Fremont County, Idaho, U.S. The state park occupies 585 acres (237 ha) off US 20 near Goose Bay and the Henrys Lake Outlet. Park facilities include hiking trails, boat ramp, campgrounds, and cabins. It is home to cutthroat trout, cutbow, moose, pronghorn, swans, pelicans, various waterfowl and sandhill cranes.

== See also ==
- List of Idaho state parks
- National Parks in Idaho
