= Three Island Crossing State Park =

State park in Idaho, United States

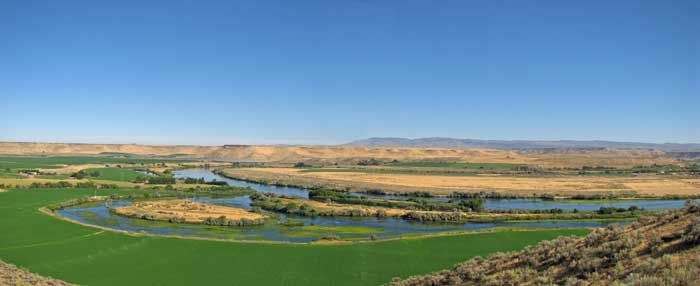

- Location within Idaho Location within the United States
- Location: Glenns Ferry, Idaho, United States
- Coordinates: 42°56′41″N 115°19′05″W
- Area: 613 acres (248 ha)
- Elevation: 2,484 ft (757 m)
- Established: 1968
- Administrator: Idaho Department of Parks and Recreation
- Website: Official website

Three Island Crossing State Park is a history-focused public recreation area in Glenns Ferry, Idaho, United States, that interprets the site of a ford of the Snake River on the Oregon Trail. The state park features camping, cabins, disk golf, and a visitors center with interpretive exhibits.

== History ==
The site was used as a river crossing until 1869 when Gus Glenn built a ferry across the river about 2 miles (3.2 km) upstream. The land was deeded from the city of Glenns Ferry to the Idaho Department of Parks and Recreation in 1968 and was formally opened to the public as a state park in 1971.

== Wildlife ==
Residential animals of this state park feature deer, waterfowl, fox, swans, songbirds, pelicans, eagles.

== See also ==
- List of Idaho state parks
- National Parks in Idaho
