= Coeur d'Alene Parkway State Park =

State park in Idaho, United States

- Location within Idaho Location within the United States
- Location: Kootenai County, Idaho, United States
- Nearest city: Coeur d'Alene, Idaho
- Coordinates: 47°37′47″N 116°41′17″W
- Elevation: 2,129 ft (649 m)
- Administrator: Idaho Department of Parks and Recreation
- Visitors: 243,014 (in 2014-2015) (expressed as Total Visitor Days)
- Length: 5.7 mi (9.2 km)
- Website: Official website

Coeur d'Alene Parkway State Park is a 5.7-mile-long (9.2 km) paved trail in Kootenai County, Idaho, United States. The parkway is located south of Coeur d'Alene along the north shore of Lake Coeur d'Alene. It is a portion of the North Idaho Centennial Trail. Park features include a boat launch, docks, and picnic area at Higgens Point.

== See also ==
- List of Idaho state parks
- National Parks in Idaho
