= Heyburn State Park =

State park in Idaho, U.S.

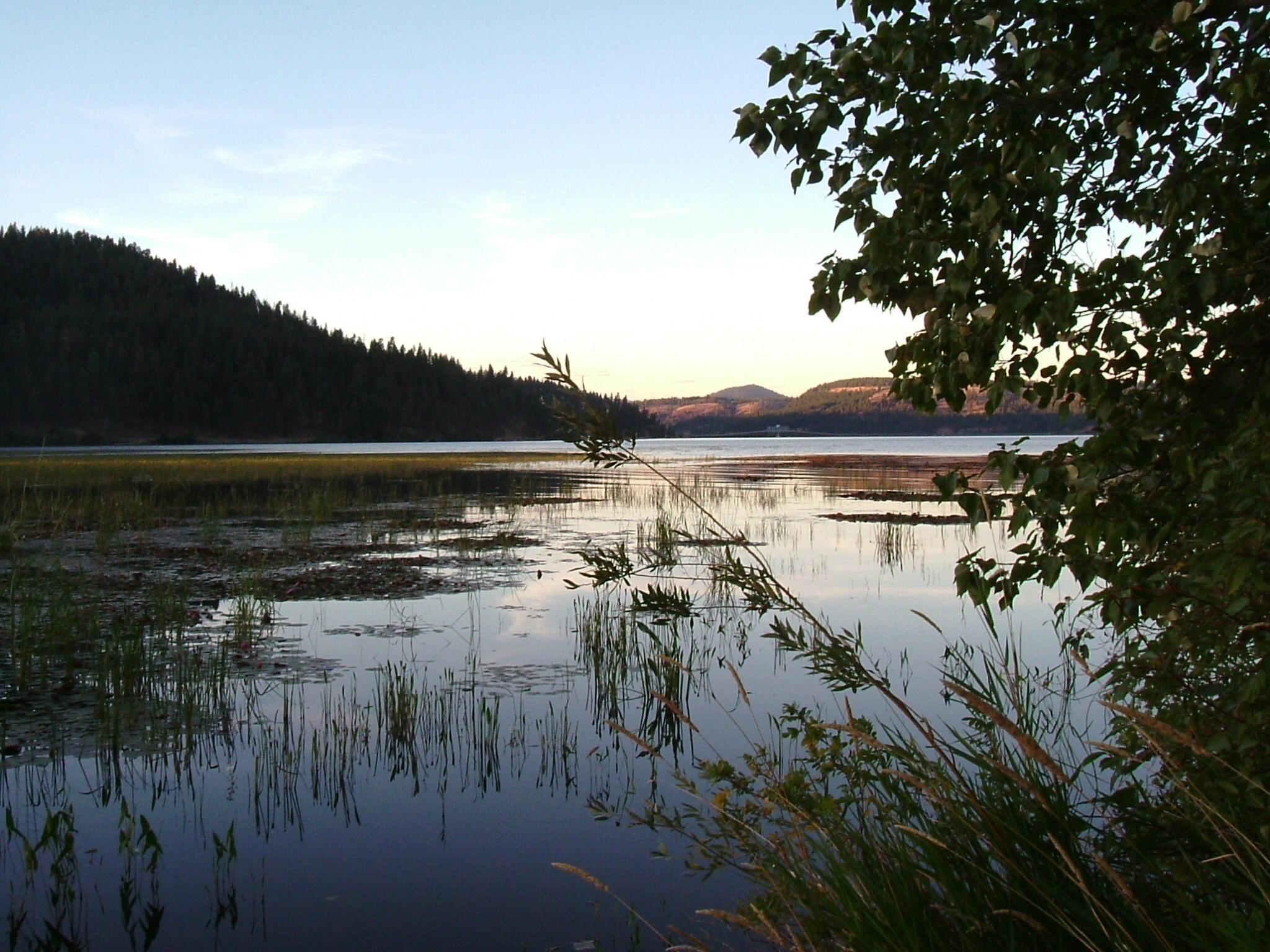

- Location within Idaho Location within the United States
- Location: Benewah and Kootenai counties, Idaho, United States
- Nearest city: Plummer, Idaho
- Coordinates: 47°21′12″N 116°46′19″W
- Area: 8,076 acres (3,268 ha)
- Elevation: 2,128–3,366 ft (649–1,026 m)
- Established: 1908
- Administrator: Idaho Department of Parks and Recreation
- Named for: Weldon B. Heyburn
- Website: Official website

Heyburn State Park is a public recreation area in the U.S. state of Idaho. It is located almost entirely in Benewah County, with a small portion extending into southern Kootenai County. The park was founded in 1908 and is the oldest state or provincial park in the Pacific Northwest. The park has 5,744 acres (2,325 ha) of land and 2,332 acres (944 ha) of water on three lakes: Benewah, Chatcolet, and Hidden. A dam constructed on the Spokane River in Post Falls in 1906 raised the level of Lake Coeur d'Alene, connecting it to the park's three lakes. The surface elevation of the lakes is 2,125 feet (648 m) above sea level. The park's year-round recreational opportunities include camping, boating, hiking, horseback riding, fishing, and picnicking.

== History ==
The Coeur d'Alene were the first inhabitants in what is now Heyburn State Park. Originally members called themselves, "Schitsu'umsh," meaning "The Discovered People" or "Those Who Are Found Here." The Natives found an abundance of fish in the three lakes of the park as well as in the Saint Joe River. Waterfowl inhabited the wetlands and deer, bear and various birds were plentiful in the grassy meadows and slopes of the surrounding mountains. Prior to the arrival of European American settlers, the Coeur d'Alene lived in what would become the Idaho Panhandle. The first Europeans to encounter the Coeur d'Alene were French traders and trappers. They found the tribe to be experienced and skilled at trading, thus the name "Coeur d'Alene," meaning "heart of the awl." One French trader described the tribe as "the greatest traders in the world." The tribe ranged over an area of over 4 million acres (16,000 km^{2}) of grassy hills, camas-prairie, wooded mountains, lakes, marshes and river habitat in northern Idaho, eastern Washington and western Montana.

The Coeur d'Alene lands were reduced to approximately 600,000 acres (240,000 ha) in 1873 when President Ulysses Grant established the Coeur d'Alene Indian Reservation. Successive government acts trimmed their property to 345,000 acres (140,000 ha) Heyburn State Park was formed from 5,500 acres (2,200 ha) of land and 2,333 acres (944 ha) of water that were taken from the Coeur d'Alene on April 20, 1908 when President William H. Taft deeded the land to the state for the creation of Heyburn State Park named for U.S. Senator Weldon Heyburn of Idaho. Heyburn had envisioned Chatcolet National Park, which passed the Senate but stalled in the House.

Construction of many of the park's facilities was performed during the Great Depression by the Civilian Conservation Corps. Members at Camp SP-1 built a lodge, roads, bridges, trails, picnic areas and shelters and campgrounds; many are still in use.

== Ecology ==
Heyburn State Park is home to a variety of habitats. Ponderosa pines, some over 400 years old, are on the mountain sides overlooking grassy hills that are covered with wildflowers. Other trees in the park included cedar, hemlock and white pine. The margins of the lake are marshy homes to wildflowers and plants.

== Activities and amenities ==
The 72-mile (116 km) Trail of the Coeur d'Alenes bike trail passes through the park, crossing the Saint Joe River on a 3,100-foot (940 m) trestle. The river and Hidden Bay, Chatcolet Lake, and Benewah Lake, all sections of the larger Lake Coeur d'Alene, are used for boating, water sports, and fishing. Common game fish include bass, pike and pan fish. The park's marina offers a boat launch, fuel dock, and supplies.

== See also ==
- List of Idaho state parks
- National Parks in Idaho
