= List of Idaho state parks =

Map of Idaho state parks.

This is a list of Idaho's 27 state parks managed by the Idaho Department of Parks and Recreation. In Idaho state code, there are 30 state parks listed, including Mowry State Park, Veteran's State Park, and Glade Creek. While these three remain state property, they are managed by entities other than the state of Idaho:

- Veterans Park in Boise is managed by the City of Boise Parks Department
- Mowry State Park on Lake Coeur d'Alene is managed by Kootenai Parks and Waterways
- Glade Creek near Lolo Pass is managed by the U.S. Forest Service

== State parks ==
Name	County	Size		Elevation		Estab- lished	Image	Remarks
Name	County	acre	ha	feet	meters	Estab- lished	Image	Remarks
Bear Lake State Park	Bear Lake	966	391	5,900	1,800	1969		Comprises two properties on the shore of Bear Lake.
Bruneau Dunes State Park	Owyhee	4,800	1,900	2,470	750	1967		Showcases dunes rising up to 470 feet (140 m) above several small lakes.
Castle Rocks State Park	Cassia	1,692	685	5,620	1,710	2003		Features granite spires and an early-20th century ranch at the base of Cache Peak.
City of Rocks National Reserve	Cassia	14,407	5,830	5,720	1,740	1988		Showcases granite spires and monoliths popular for rock climbing.
Dworshak State Park	Clearwater	850	340	1,600	490	1989		Comprises three properties on the shore of the reservoir created by the Dworshak Dam.
Eagle Island State Park	Ada	545	221	2,724	830	1983		Features day-use recreational facilities, including a swimming beach and water slide, near Boise.
Farragut State Park	Kootenai	4,000	1,600	2,054	626	1966		Features recreational facilities on Lake Pend Oreille at the site of a former U.S. Navy training base.
Harriman State Park	Fremont	11,000	4,500	6,120	1,870	1977		Preserves expansive wildlife habitat, a historic ranch, and fly fishing in Henrys Fork within the Greater Yellowstone Ecosystem.
Hells Gate State Park	Idaho	960	390	733	223	1973		Contains the mouth of Hells Canyon, the deepest canyon in North America.
Henrys Lake State Park	Fremont	585	237	6,470	1,970	1973		Adjoins Henrys Lake 15 miles (24 km) west of Yellowstone National Park.
Heyburn State Park	Benewah	8,106	3,280	2,128	649	1908		Preserves three lakes in the oldest state park in the Pacific Northwest.
Lake Cascade State Park	Valley	500	200	4,828	1,472	1999		Comprises properties dispersed around Lake Cascade's 86 miles (138 km) of shoreline.
Lake Walcott State Park	Minidoka	65	26	4,700	1,400	1999		Provides water recreation at the northwest end of Lake Walcott.
Land of the Yankee Fork State Park	Custer	521	211	5,001–6,500	1,524–1,981	1990		Interprets Idaho's frontier mining history, including the ghost towns of Bayhorse, Bonanza, and Custer.
Lucky Peak State Park	Ada	240	97	2,750	840	1956		Comprises three day-use areas east of Boise on Lucky Peak Lake and the Boise River.
Massacre Rocks State Park	Power	990	400	4,400	1,300	1967		Preserves a boulder field on the Snake River where emigrants on the Oregon and California Trails feared ambush by Native Americans.
McCroskey State Park	Benewah, Latah	5,300	2,100	3,039–4,324	926–1,318	1955		Offers a scenic drive along a ridge overlooking the Palouse.
Old Mission State Park	Kootenai	18	7.3	2,200	670	1975		Interprets the oldest standing building in Idaho, finished in 1853 as a Jesuit mission to the Coeur d'Alene people.
Ponderosa State Park	Valley	1,515	613	5,050	1,540	1973		Preserves a peninsula jutting into Payette Lake.
Priest Lake State Park	Bonner	755	306	2,440	740	1973		Comprises three units around Priest Lake in the Selkirk Mountains.
Round Lake State Park	Bonner	142	57	2,122	647	1965		Surrounds a 58-acre (23 ha) lake.
Thousand Springs State Park	Gooding	1,500	610	2,800	850	2005		Comprises multiple units in the Hagerman Valley where numerous springs charged by the Snake River Aquifer flow out of the eastern valley wall.
Three Island Crossing State Park	Elmore	613	248	2,484	757	1968		Interprets the site of a ford over the Snake River on the Oregon Trail,
Winchester Lake State Park	Lewis	418	169	3,900	1,200	1969		Surrounds a 104-acre (42 ha) lake known for its rainbow trout fishing.

== State trails ==
Name	County	Length		Elevation		Estab- lished	Image	Remarks
Name	County	mi	km	feet	meters	Estab- lished	Image	Remarks
Ashton to Tetonia Trail	Fremont, Teton	29.6	47.6	5,277–6,064	1,608–1,848	2010		Follows the abandoned railroad grade of the Teton Valley Branch of the Union Pacific Railroad.
Coeur d'Alene Parkway State Park	Kootenai	5.7	9.2	2,187	667			Provides a walking and bicycling path along the north shore of Lake Coeur d'Alene, as the east end of the North Idaho Centennial Trail.
Trail of the Coeur d'Alenes	Benewah, Kootenai, Shoshone	73	117	2,200–3,280	670–1,000	2004		Comprises a 73-mile (117 km) paved rail trail across the Idaho Panhandle.

== See also ==
- List of U.S. national parks
- National Parks in Idaho
