= Castle Rocks State Park =

State park in Idaho, United States

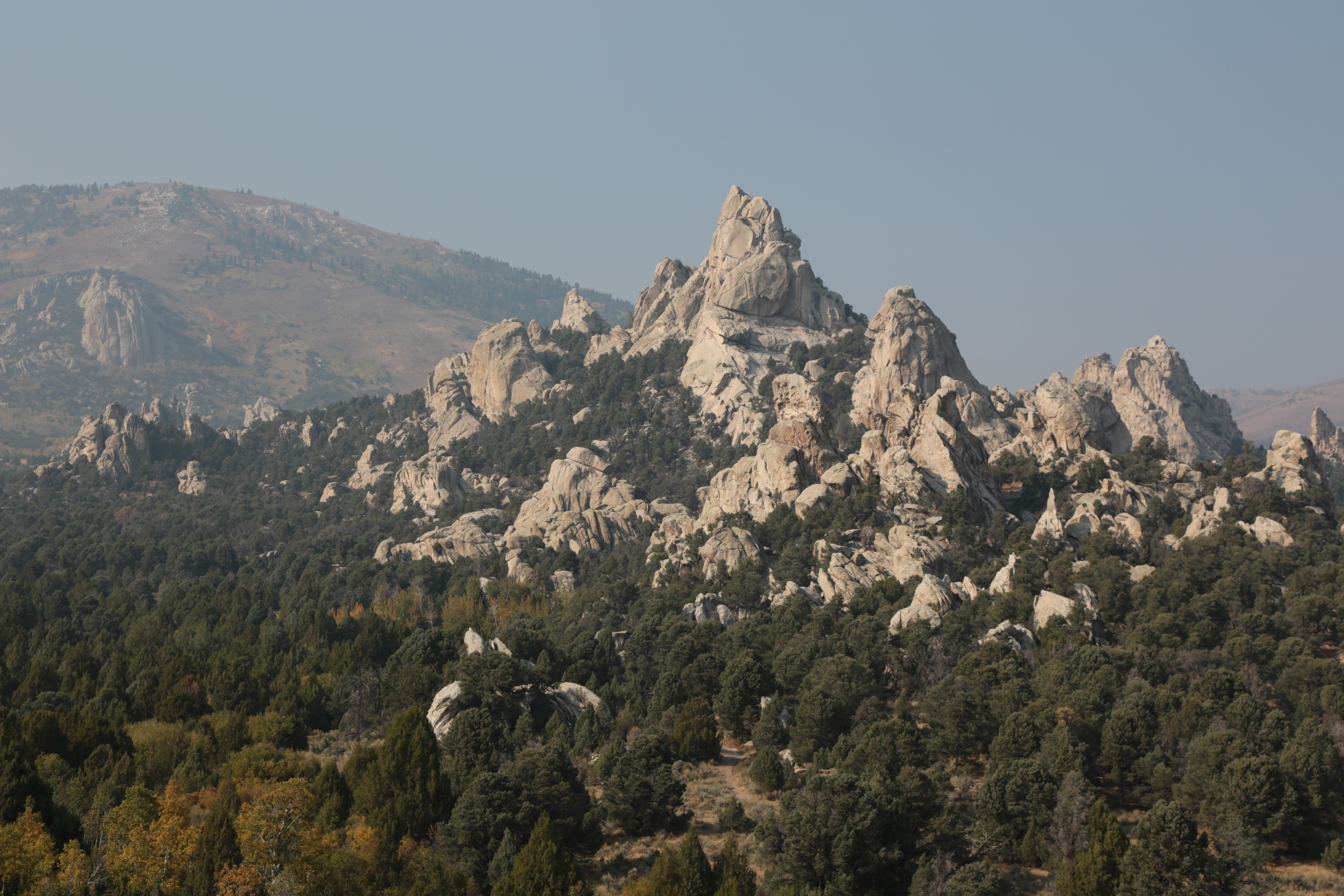

- Location within Idaho Location within the United States
- Location: Cassia County, Idaho, United States
- Nearest city: Burley, Idaho
- Coordinates: 42°07′33″N 113°39′32″W
- Area: 1,692 acres (685 ha)
- Elevation: 5,620–6,540 ft (1,710–1,990 m)
- Established: 2003
- Administrator: Idaho Department of Parks and Recreation
- Website: Official website

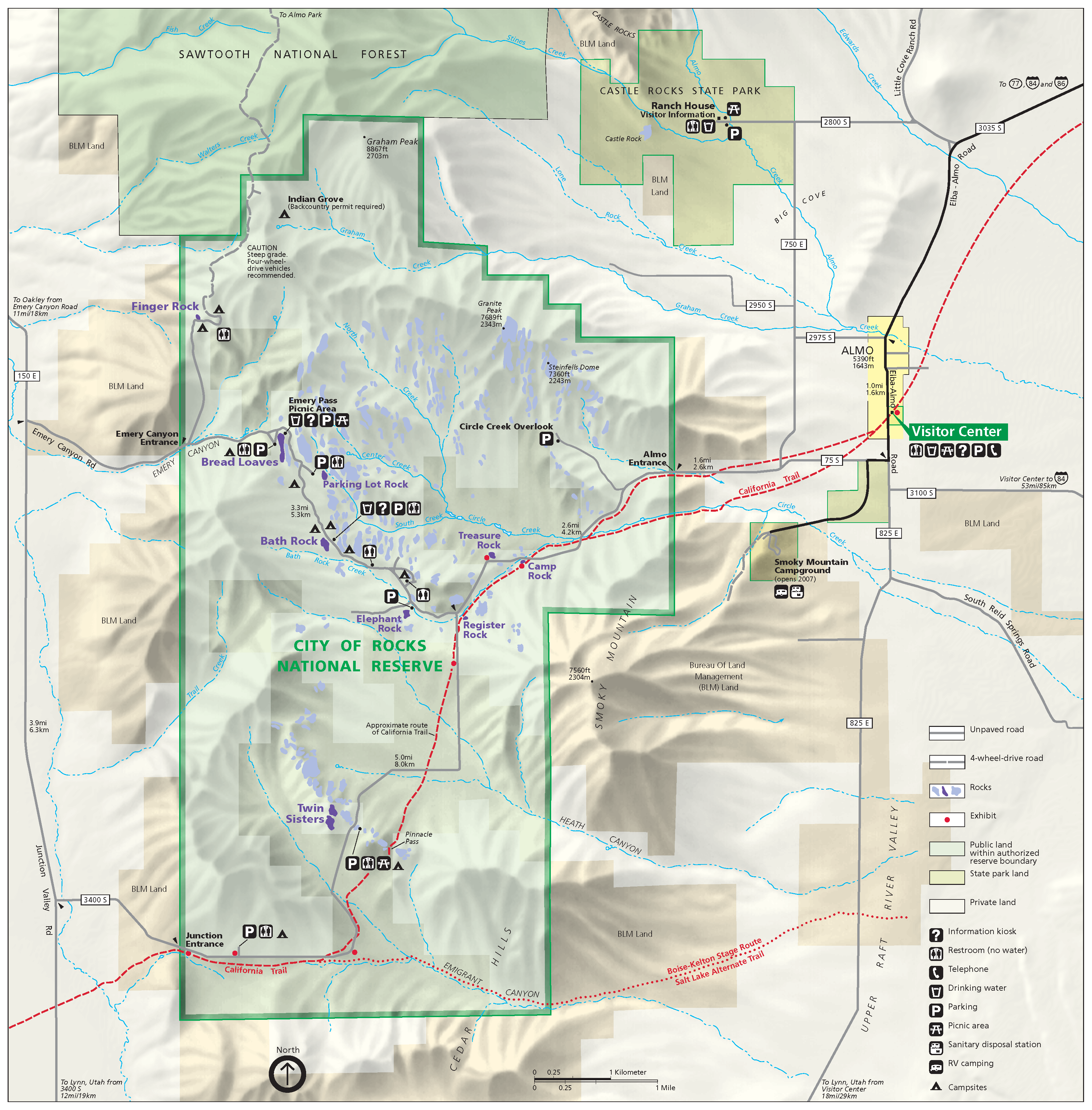
Map of Castle Rocks State Park and City of Rocks National Reserve

Castle Rocks State Park is a public recreation area encompassing 1,692 acres (685 ha) in Cassia County, Idaho, United States. The state park is located in Big Cove at the base of Cache Peak in the Albion Mountains. It is next to the Albion Division of Sawtooth National Forest and about 1.5 miles (2.4 km) from the border of City of Rocks National Reserve.

== History ==
In 2000, the Castle Rock Ranch Acquisition Act was passed, and money from the Conservation and Access funds were used to purchase the private ranch at Castle Rocks. Following the purchase by the National Park Service, the lands were transferred to the state of Idaho:

After the acquisition, the NPS exchanged the property with the Idaho Department of Parks and Recreation (IDPR) for other lands adjacent to existing NPS properties. Since May 25, 2003, the IDPR has provided park facilities and managed recreation at Castle Rocks.

The park was expanded by 200 acres (81 ha) in 2007.

== Wildlife ==
This state park is home to moose, cougar, coyote, mule deer, sage grouse, pinyon jay and Virginia's warbler.

== See also ==
- List of Idaho state parks
- National Parks in Idaho
