= Harriman State Park (Idaho) =

State park in Idaho, United States

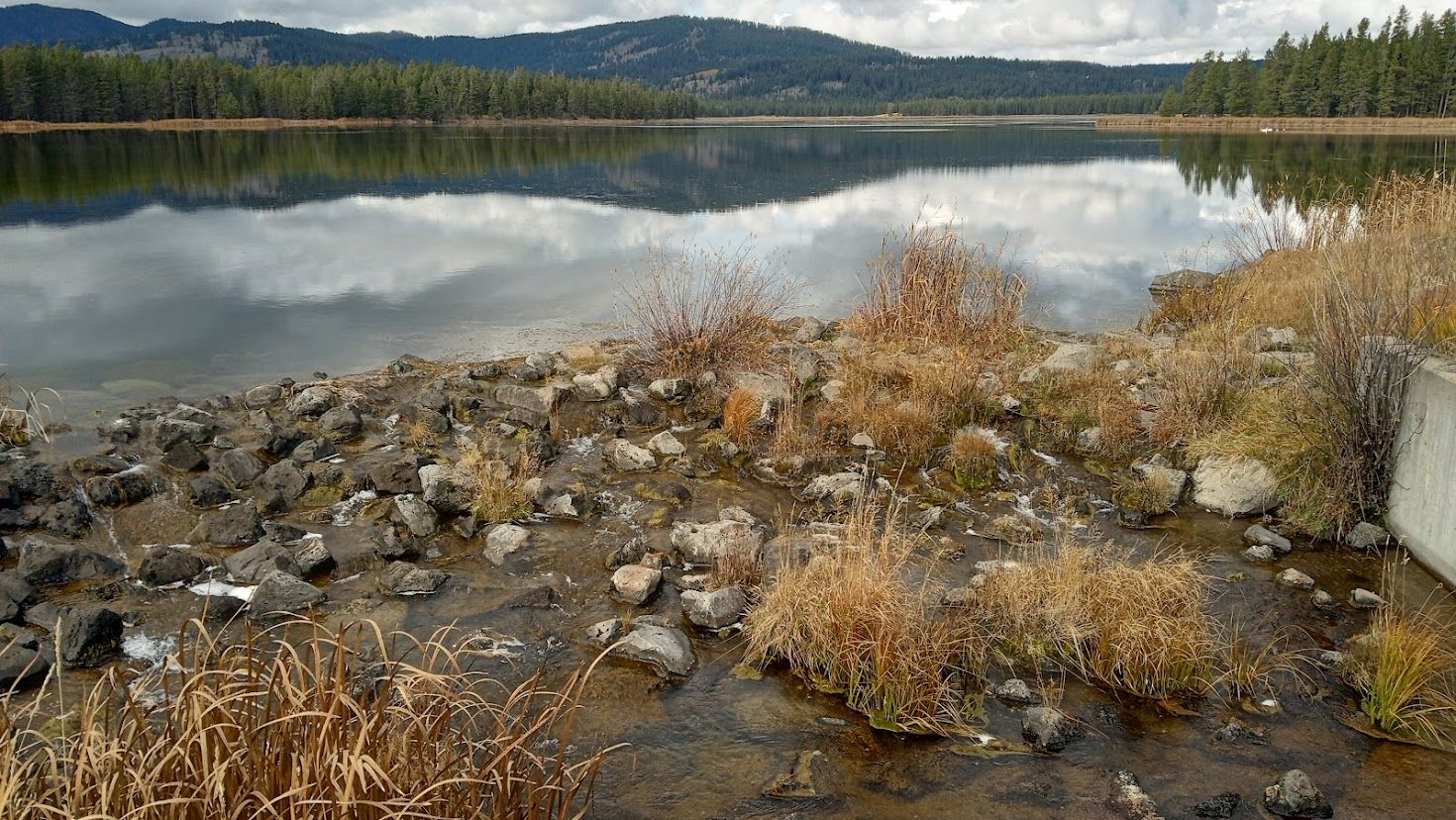
- Henrys Fork in Harriman State Park

- Location within Idaho Location within the United States
- Location: Fremont County, Idaho, United States
- Nearest city: Island Park, Idaho
- Coordinates: 44°19′21″N 111°27′37″W
- Area: 11,000 acres (4,500 ha)
- Elevation: 6,120 ft (1,870 m)
- Established: 1977; opened 1982
- Administrator: Idaho Department of Parks and Recreation
- Website: Official website

Harriman State Park is a public recreation area situated on the 11,000-acre (4,500 ha) Harriman Wildlife Refuge in Fremont County, located three miles (4.8 km) south of Island Park in eastern Idaho, United States. The state park is located within the Henry's Fork Caldera, which is part of the Greater Yellowstone Ecosystem. It serves as a habitat for various wildlife, including elk, moose, sandhill cranes, trumpeter swans, and the occasional black or grizzly bear. Two-thirds of the trumpeter swans that winter in the contiguous United States spend the season in Harriman State Park.

== History ==
The park's acreage was owned by Union Pacific Railroad investors from 1902 to 1977, serving as a cattle ranch and private retreat for the Harriman and Guggenheim families. It was deeded to Idaho for free in 1977 by Roland and W. Averell Harriman, whose insistence that the state have a professional park managing service helped prompt the creation of the Idaho Department of Parks and Recreation in 1965. The park opened to the public in 1982.

== Support group ==
Friends of Harriman State Park, Inc., a 501(c)(3) organization, was established in 2010 with the aim of supporting community projects that directly benefit Harriman State Park in Idaho. The formation of this organization came in response to an announcement by the State of Idaho regarding the potential complete reduction of park funding and the potential dissolution of the Idaho Department of Parks and Recreation into another state agency. However, these measures were not implemented.

== Activities and amenities ==
Henrys Fork, a fly-fishing stream of note, winds through park meadows for eight miles. The park offers trails for hiking, biking, and horseback riding. In winter, roads and trails are groomed for cross-country skiing.

== See also ==
- List of Idaho state parks
- National Parks in Idaho
