= Felt, Idaho =

Unincorporated community in the state of Idaho, United States

- Unincorporated community
- Location within Idaho Location within the United States
- Coordinates: 43°52′23″N 111°11′05″W
- Country: United States
- State: Idaho
- County: Teton
- Elevation: 6,037 ft (1,840 m)
- Time zone: UTC-7 (Mountain (MST))
  - Summer (DST): UTC-6 (MDT)
- ZIP code: 83424
- Area codes: 208, 986
- GNIS feature ID: 397700

Felt is an unincorporated community in Teton County, Idaho, United States. Felt is located on Idaho State Highway 32, 4 miles (6.4 km) north-northeast of Tetonia. Felt no longer has a post office, but its ZIP code is 83424.

== History ==
Felt's population was 20 in 1960.
