= Idaho Department of Parks and Recreation =

State agency in Idaho, United States

Agency overview
- Formed: 1965
- Jurisdiction: Government of Idaho
- Headquarters: 5657 E Warm Springs Ave, Boise, ID 83716
- Agency executive: Susan E. Buxton, Director
- Website: Official

The Idaho Department of Parks and Recreation (IDPR) is a state-level government agency of Idaho that manages state parks throughout Idaho as well as the registration programs for boats, snowmobiles and other off-highway vehicles.

== History ==
Idaho's oldest state park, Heyburn, was created in 1908, the first state park in the state and in the Pacific Northwest. For much of the park system's history, it was managed by the Idaho Department of Lands, and briefly by the Idaho Transportation Department in the late 1940s. A professional park management agency wasn't created until 1965, this being a qualification both for the donation of Harriman State Park and for federal Land and Water Conservation Fund money. Those federal grants, largely raised from fees charged to oil companies for offshore drilling, brought $60 million into Idaho for city and county parks as well as state parks. In 1981, the Department of Parks and Recreation began charging entrance fees, which support park operations and maintenance. Total visitation across the system is more than 4.5 million annually.

== Programs and structure ==
The department's mission statement is "to improve the quality of life in Idaho through outdoor recreation and resource stewardship." The department has the dual duty of "protecting and preserving the resources of the state park system and of providing recreation opportunities and facilities for public use." The park system has four classifications: natural parks, which preserve significant natural resources; recreation parks, which offer opportunities for outdoor activities; heritage parks, which preserve and interpret sites of cultural importance; and recreation trailways. As of 2018, IDPR managed 27 state parks, a count that includes the state-managed City of Rocks National Reserve.

== See also ==
- List of Idaho state parks
