= National Parks in Idaho =

The six national parks, reserves, historic sites, and monuments in Idaho contain a wide variety of interesting places and experiences. These include recreational areas, archeological sites, nature preserves and volcanic parks.

== The parks ==
=== City of Rocks National Reserve ===
Designated as a National Reserve in 1988 and located in on the southern edge of Idaho near the Utah border (42.067271°N 113.701399°W), this site is also known as the Silent City of Rocks. The park covers almost 14,000 acres (57 km^{2}) and is adjacent to Castle Rocks State Park. As its name implies, the area is notable for its rock formations and is largely composed of granitic rock; the park is a popular location for rock climbers, offering a variety of routes for climbers of different skill levels.

At the time settlers began traveling through the area the Shoshone and Bannock tribes inhabited the region. In 1826, Peter Skene Ogden and his Snake River brigade of beaver trappers were the first Euro-Americans to note the City of Rocks. However, the lack of beavers in the area caused the area to be ignored until the 1840s, when immigrant wagon trains began traveling through the area along the California Trail during the summer migration season. In 1849, a party of settlers "encamped at the city of the rocks" on the California Trail. Visitors can see marks on rock faces from axle grease. One immigrant described seeing distant rocks and said they were like "water thrown up into the air from numerous artificial hydrants." Since then the City of Rocks became a landmark for emigrants traveling along the California Trail and Salt Lake Alternate Trail.

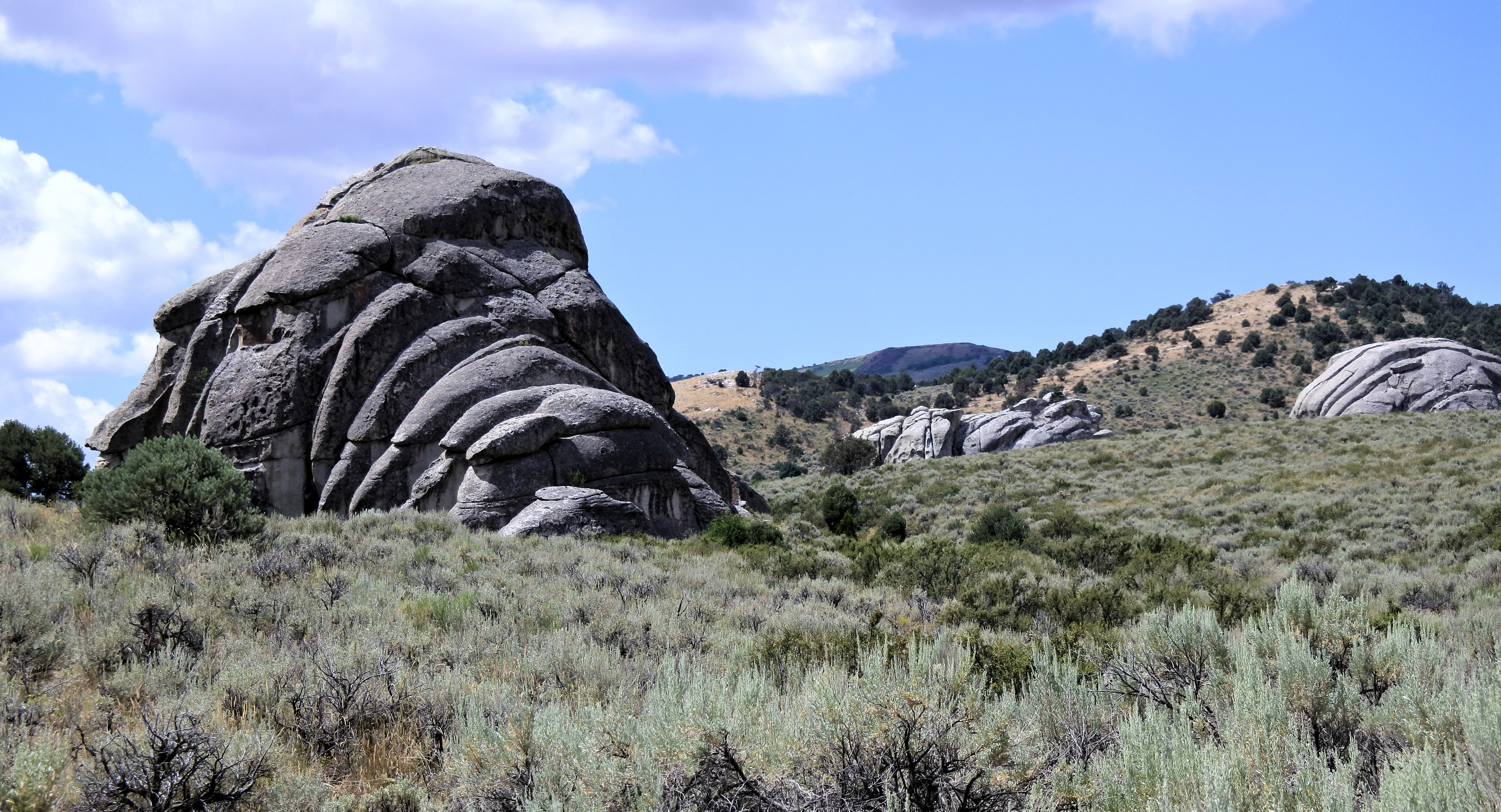
City of Rocks National Reserve

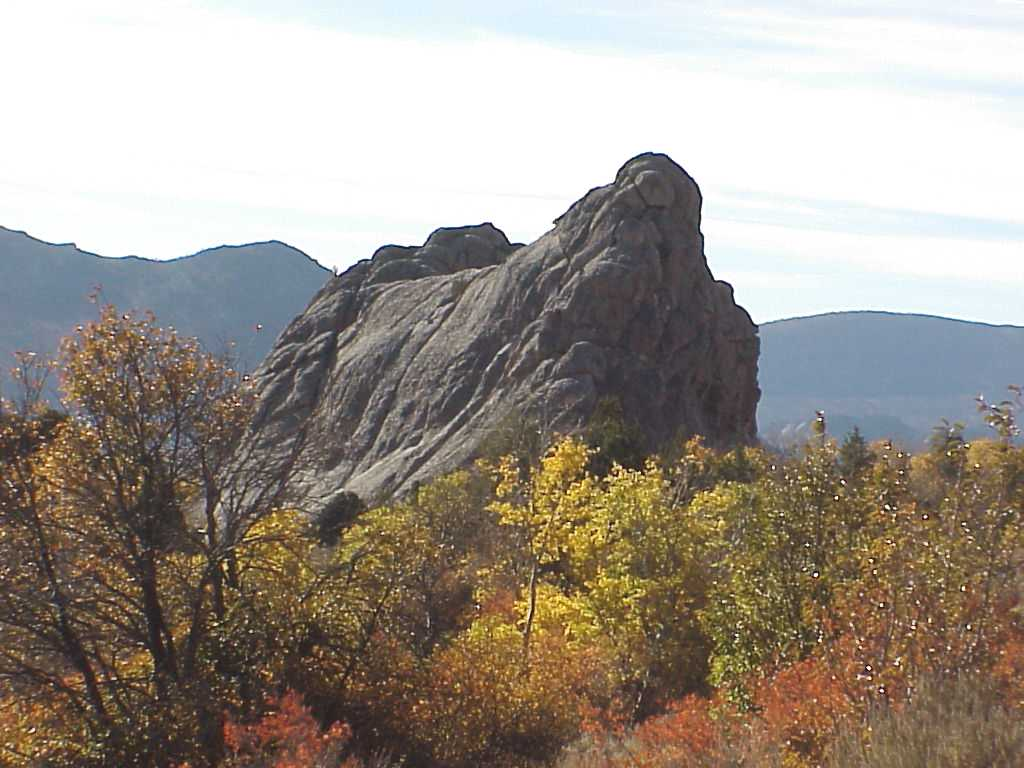
Bath Rock

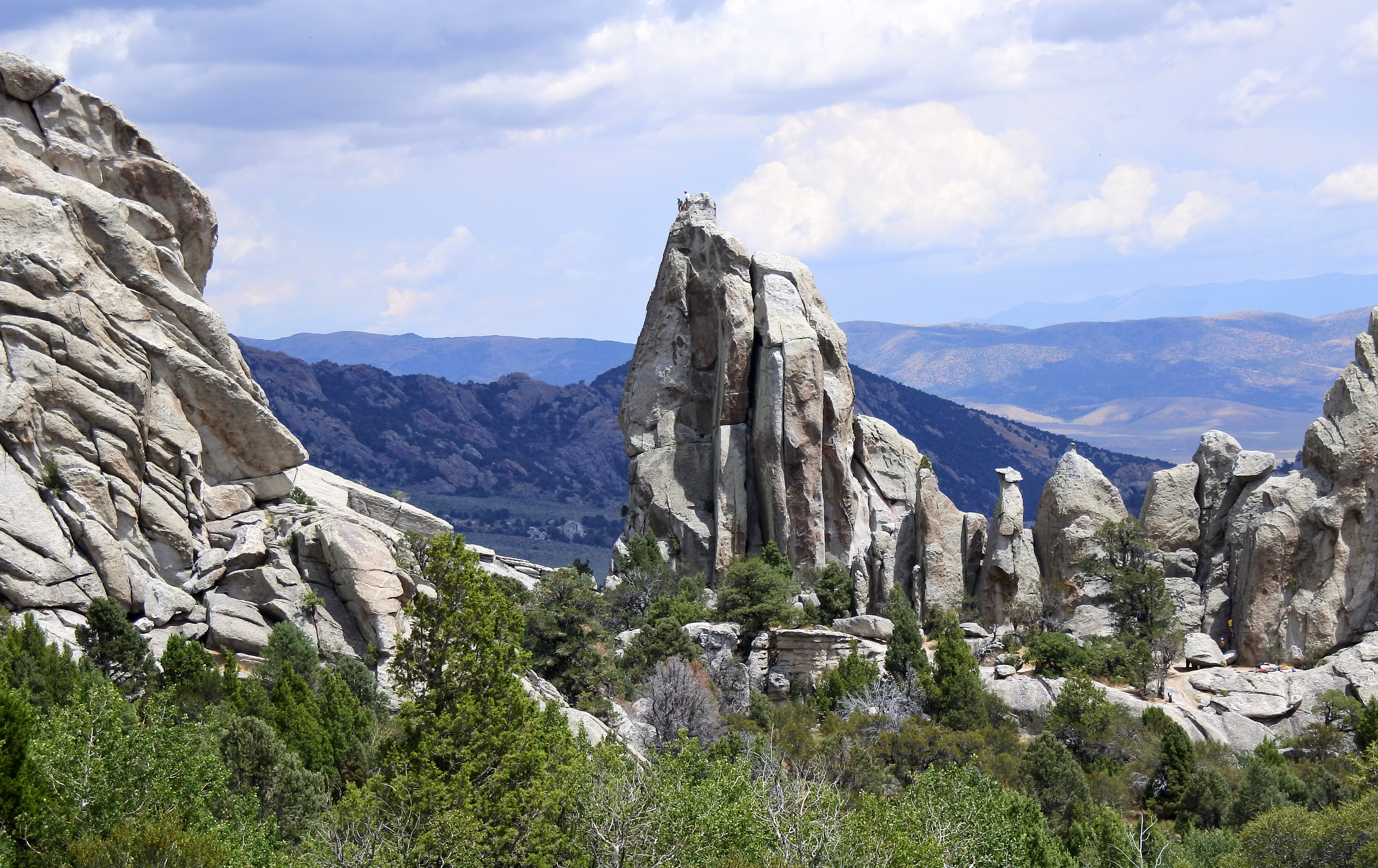
Morning Glory Spire

=== Craters of the Moon National Monument and Preserve ===
This national park and monument is located in central Idaho (43.221242°N 113.511654°W) along the Snake River plain. The park covers an area of 410,000 acres (1,700 km^{2}) and has an average elevation of 5,900 ft (1,800 m) The area contains different volcanic formations, basalt flows, and significant lava flows, tubes, and tree molds. Areas of sagebrush, steppe, and grassland cover a total area of 1,117 square miles (2,893 km^{2}). An area within the preserve was named a national monument on May 2, 1924 and expanded by President Bill Clinton in 2000. It currently covers parts of Blaine, Butte, Lincoln, Minidoka, and Power counties. The park was officially named Craters of the Moon National Preserve in August 2002. The park is jointly managed by the National Park Service and the Bureau of Land Management.

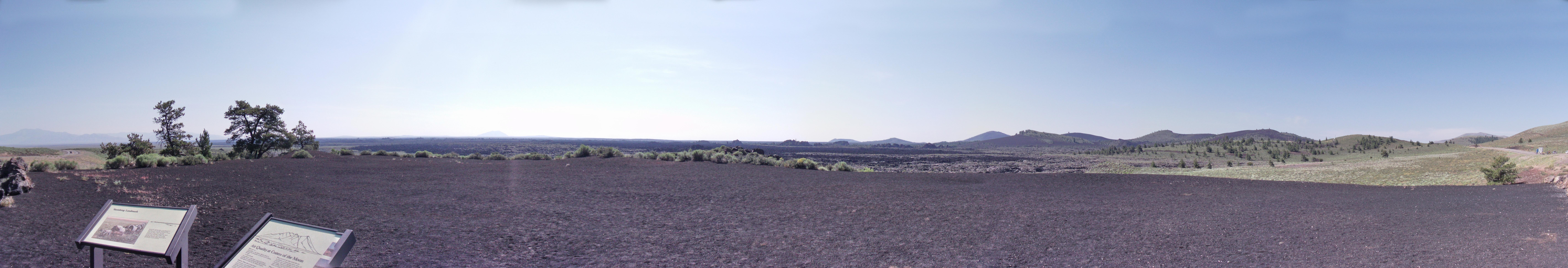
A panoramic image of the Craters of the Moon

=== Hagerman Fossil Beds National Monument ===
Located in south central Idaho (42.820073°N 114.898490°W), running along the west bank of the Snake River, this national park is home to a large collection of Hageraman Horse fossils. This paleontological site dates to the late Pliocene era and is known as the Hagerman Horse Quarry. The site contains many fossilized plants and animals and are considered some of the latest fossils from their era. In 1975, the archeological site was declared a National Natural Landmark by President Gerald Ford. The visitor center and museum for the park is in the town of Hagerman, Idaho, located on the east side of the Snake river, opposite the park. Developed locations for visitors to the monument and park are two overlook locations, one of the Snake river, and one overlooking a section of the historic Oregon Trail.

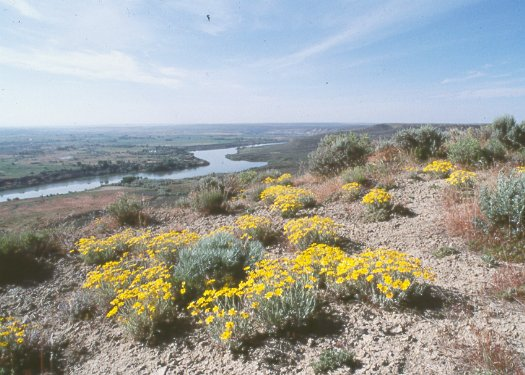
Flowers River, Hagerman National Monument.

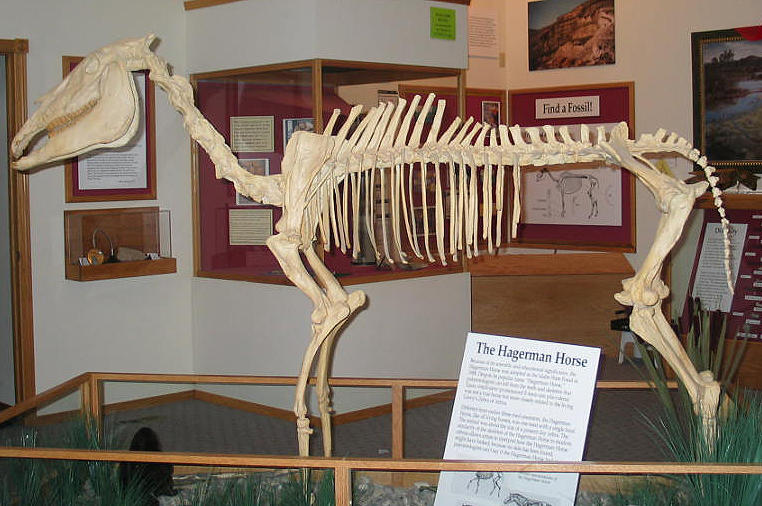
Hagerman Horse Skeleton at Hagerman Visitors Center.

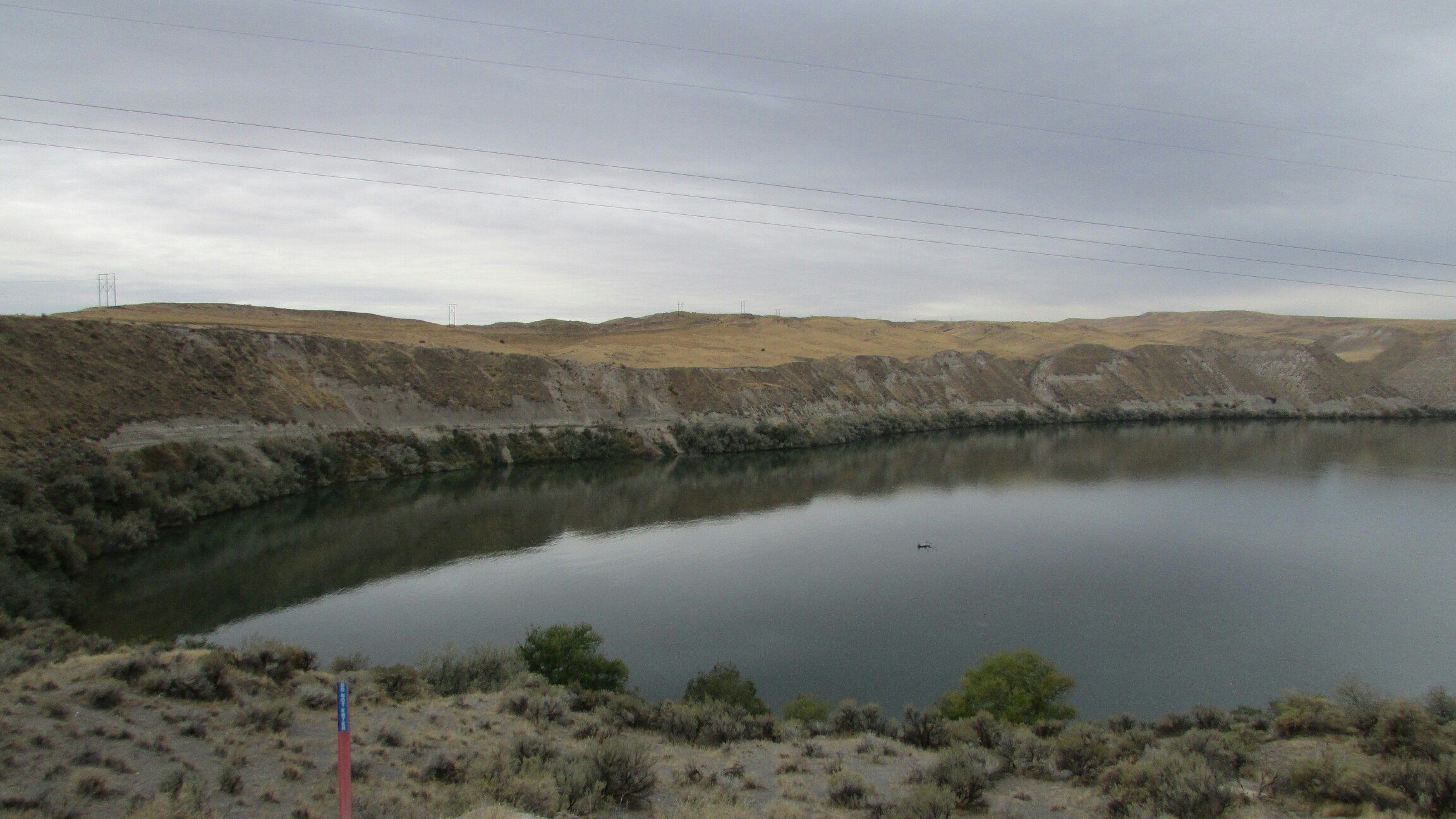
The Snake River at Hagerman Fossil Beds

=== Minidoka National Historic Site ===
Located in south central Idaho (42.679°N 114.244°W), this historic site remembers the 9,000+ Japanese Americans that were unjustly imprisoned at the Minidoka Internment Camp during World War II. The camp site was placed on the National Register of Historic Places on July 10, 1979. The site measures approximately 210 acres (0.85 km^{2}).

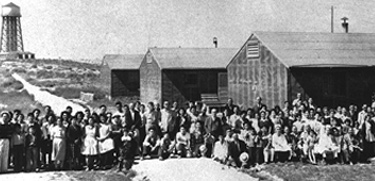
Japanese-American prisoners at Minidoka.

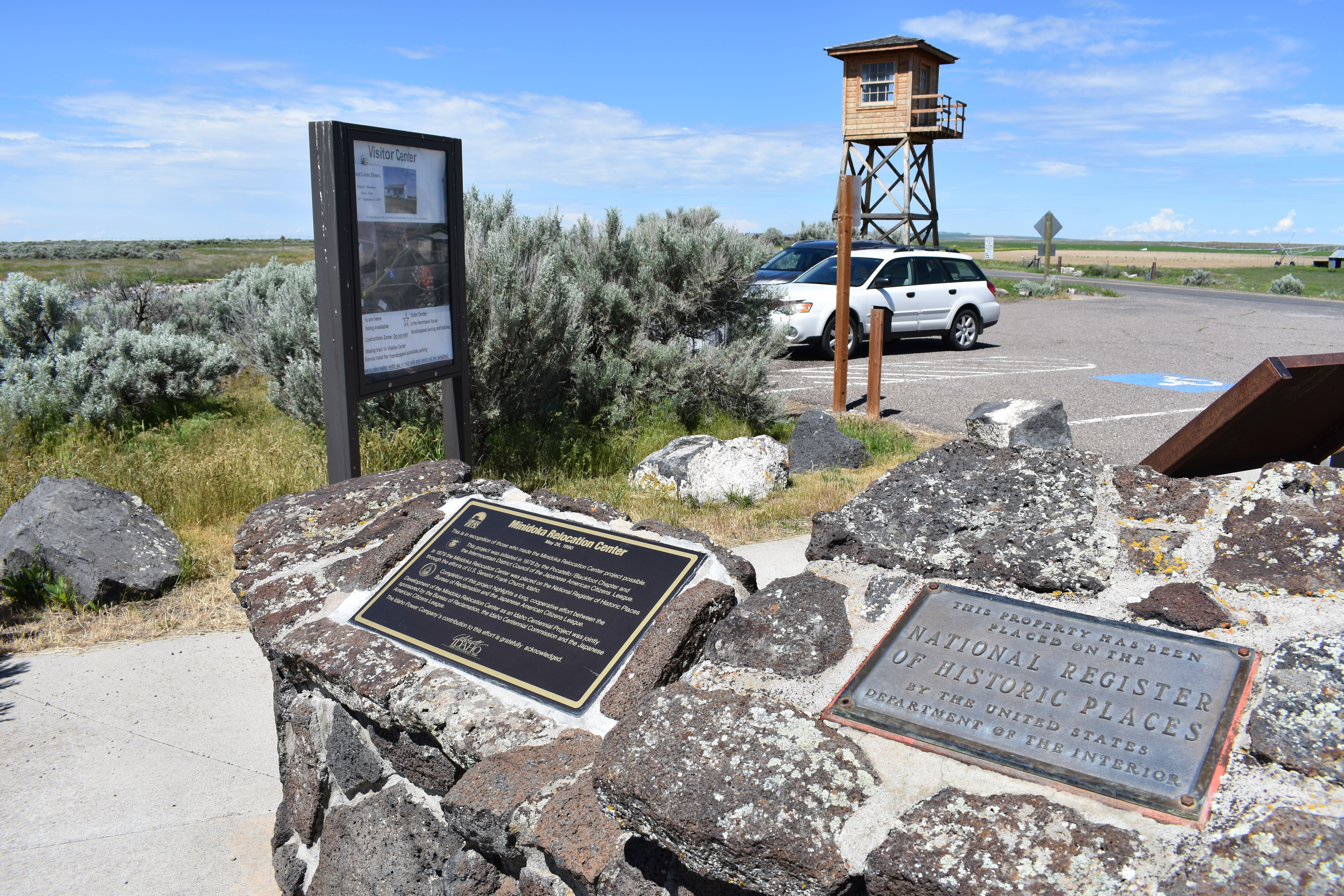
The Minidoka National Historic Site.

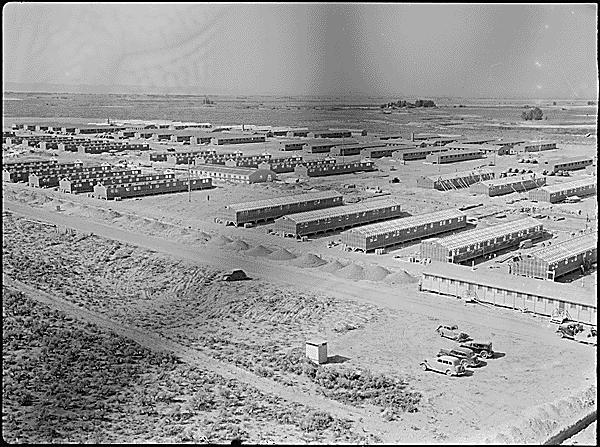
Minidoka Japanese American Internment Camp (1943).

=== Nez Perce National Historical Park ===
Established in 1965 and consisting of 38 individual locations spread across Idaho, Washington, Oregon, and Montana, the park preserves some of the lands originally home to the Nez Perce tribe of Native Americans. The Nez Perce National Historical Park Visitor Center is home to a museum about the Nez Perce and their history. Since the park is spread across such as wide area, it includes several distinct ecosystems, climates and histories, each of which impacted the life of the Nez Perce.

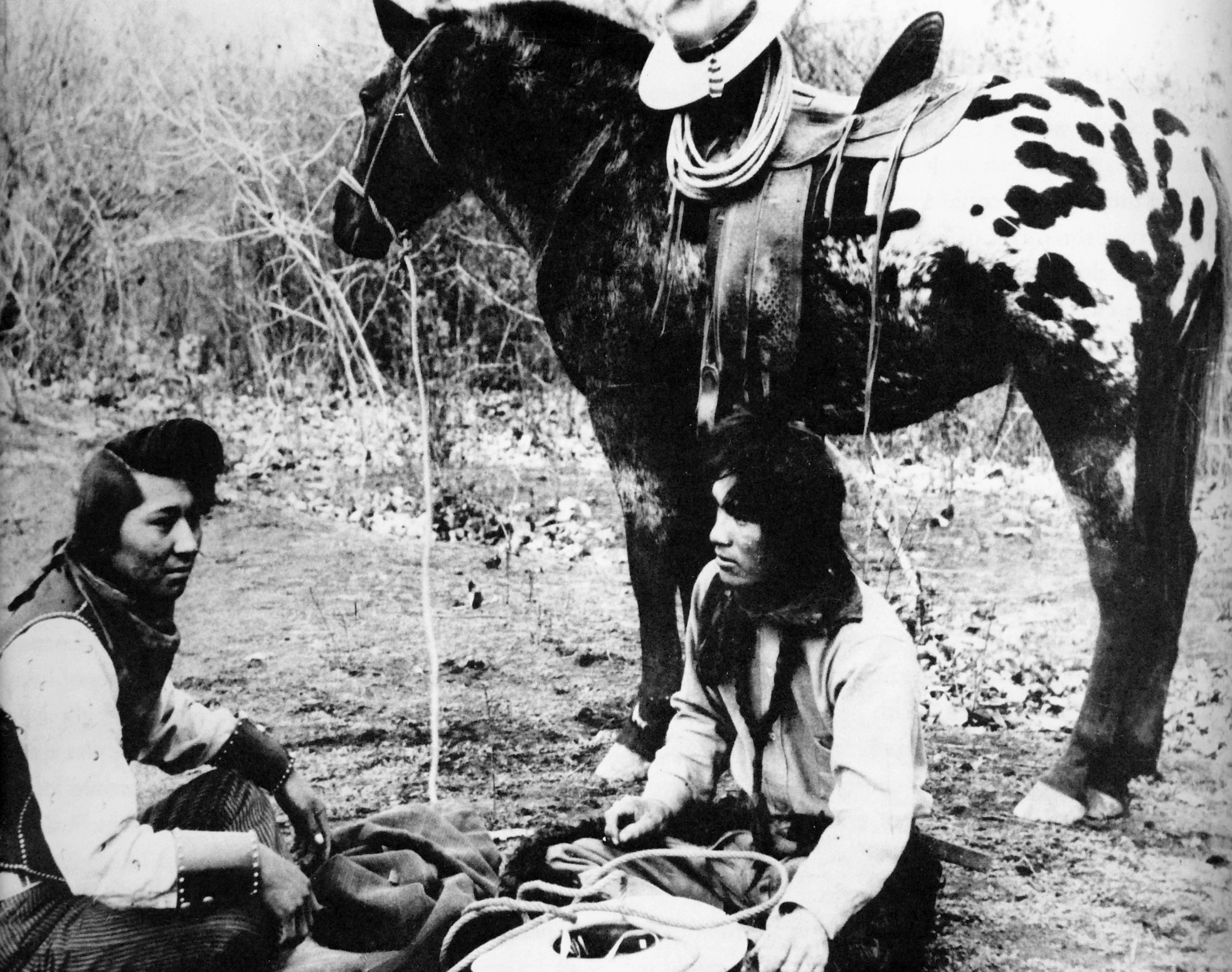
Nez Perce Indians with Appaloosa horse (c.1895).

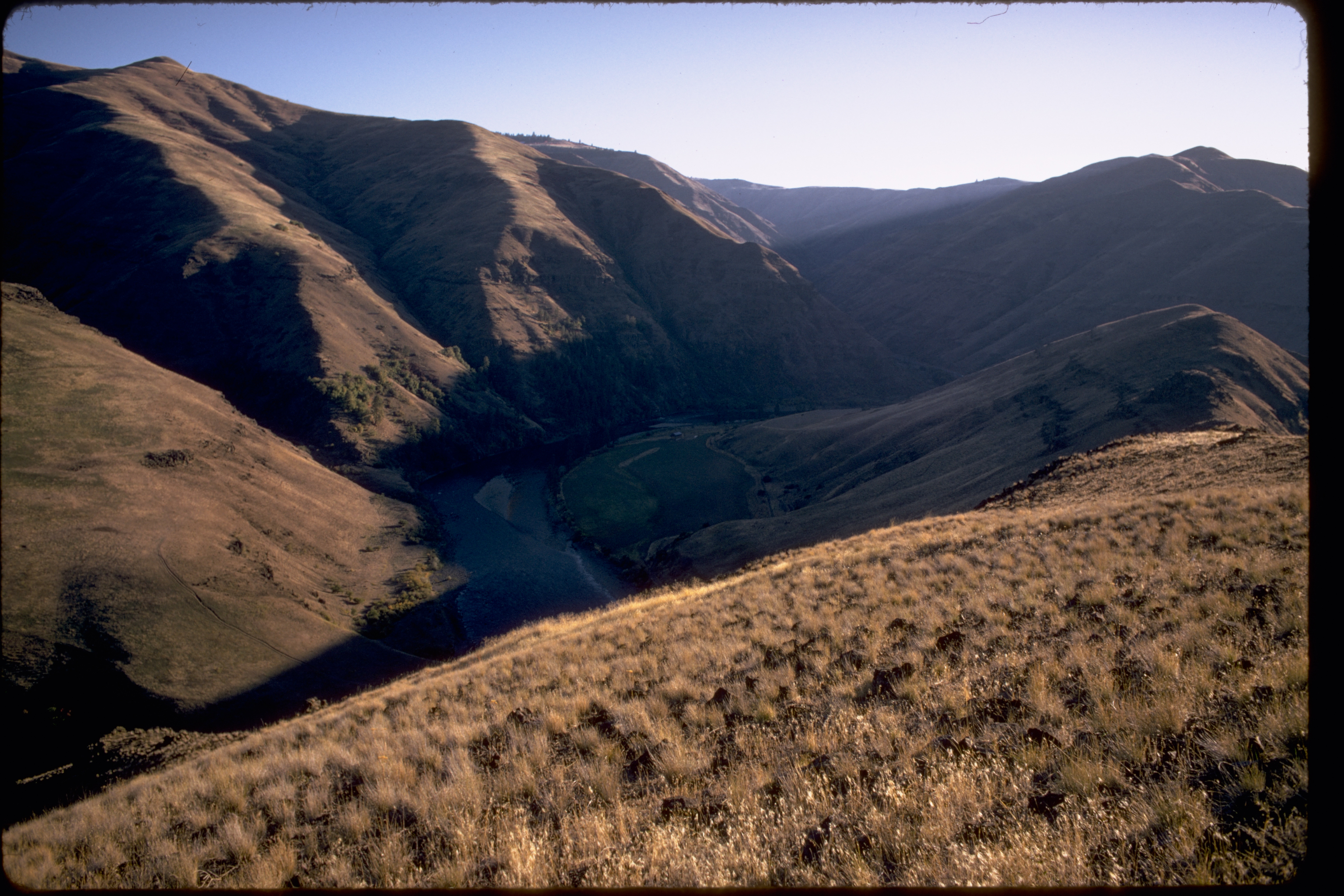
Nez Perce National Historical Park.

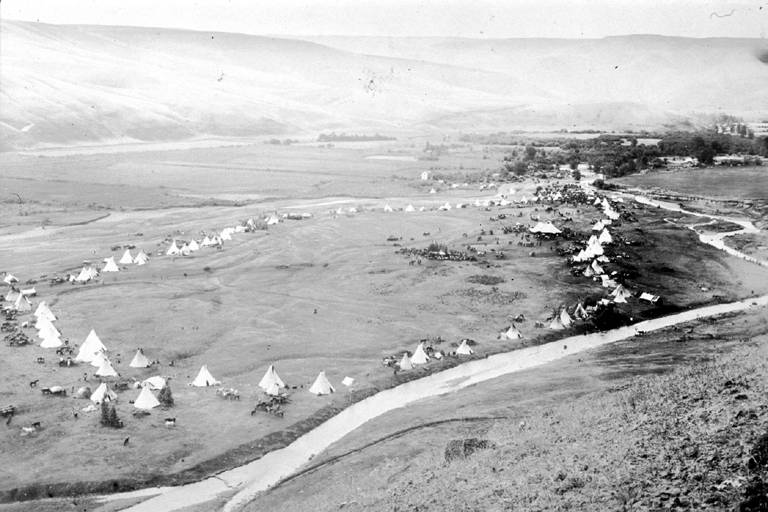
Nez Perce encampment (1899).

=== Yellowstone National Park ===
Established by Congress in 1872, Yellowstone was the first national park in the United States, and covers an area of 3,468.4 square miles (8,983 km^{2}); it is regarded by some as the world's first national park. Yellowstone is renowned for its geothermal landscapes and features; Old Faithful geyser is located in the park and is a key attraction at the park. Much of Yellowstone is situated on four overlapping volcanic calderas, collectively known as the Yellowstone Caldera. This vast underground system is responsible for the volcanism and geothermal activity at the park. The Greater Yellowstone Ecosystem is one of the last remaining large, nearly intact ecosystems in the northern temperate zone of the Earth. (Note: Credit: Greater Yellowstone Ecosystem.) While the park is widely known for its geothermal landscapes, it contains a vast area of subalpine forests. Yellowstone's bison herds make up the largest bison population in the United States and are notable for being one of the few bison herds that has not been altered by inbreeding with cattle.

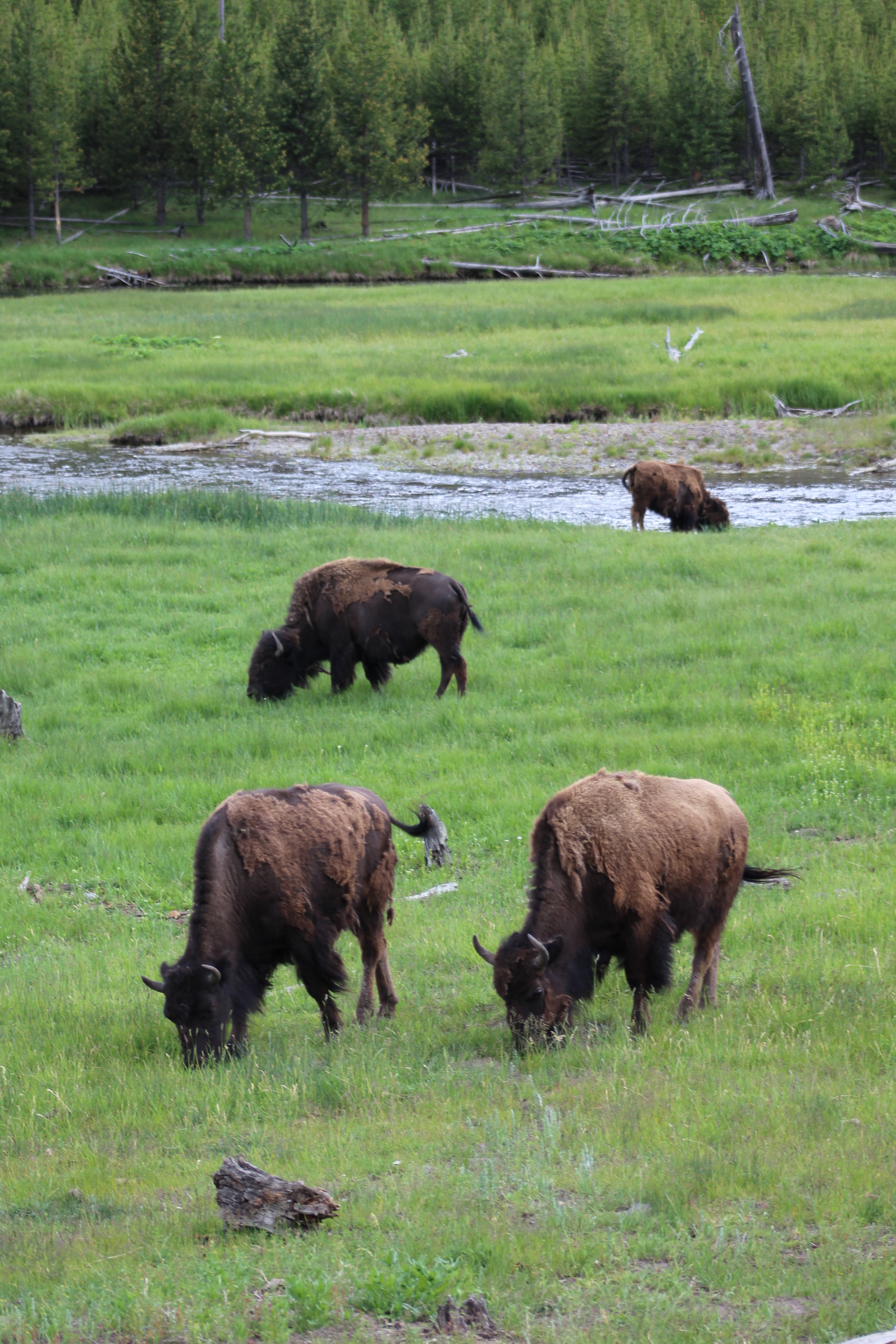
Buffalo grazing at Yellowstone.

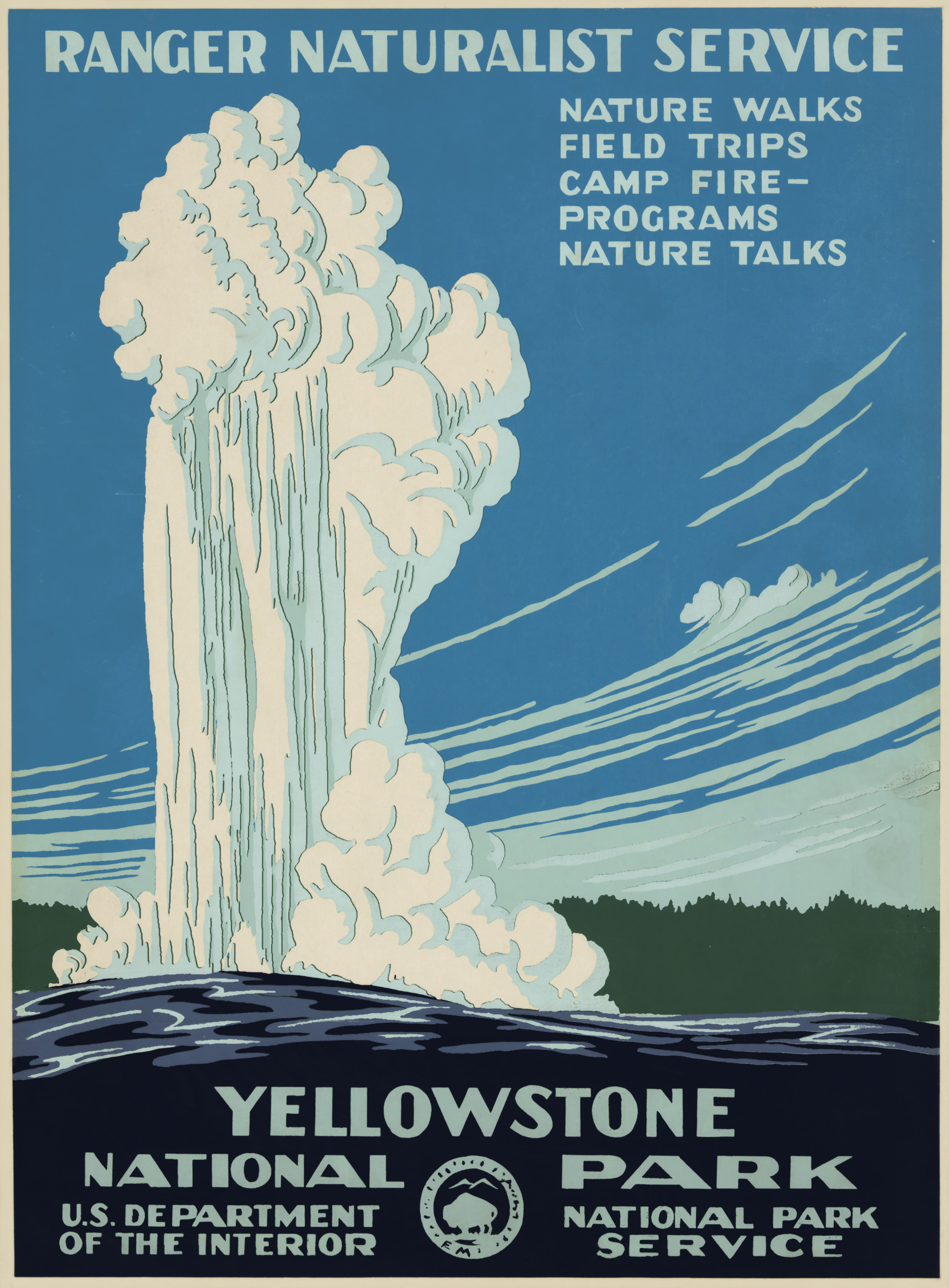
1938 poster from Yellowstone National Park.

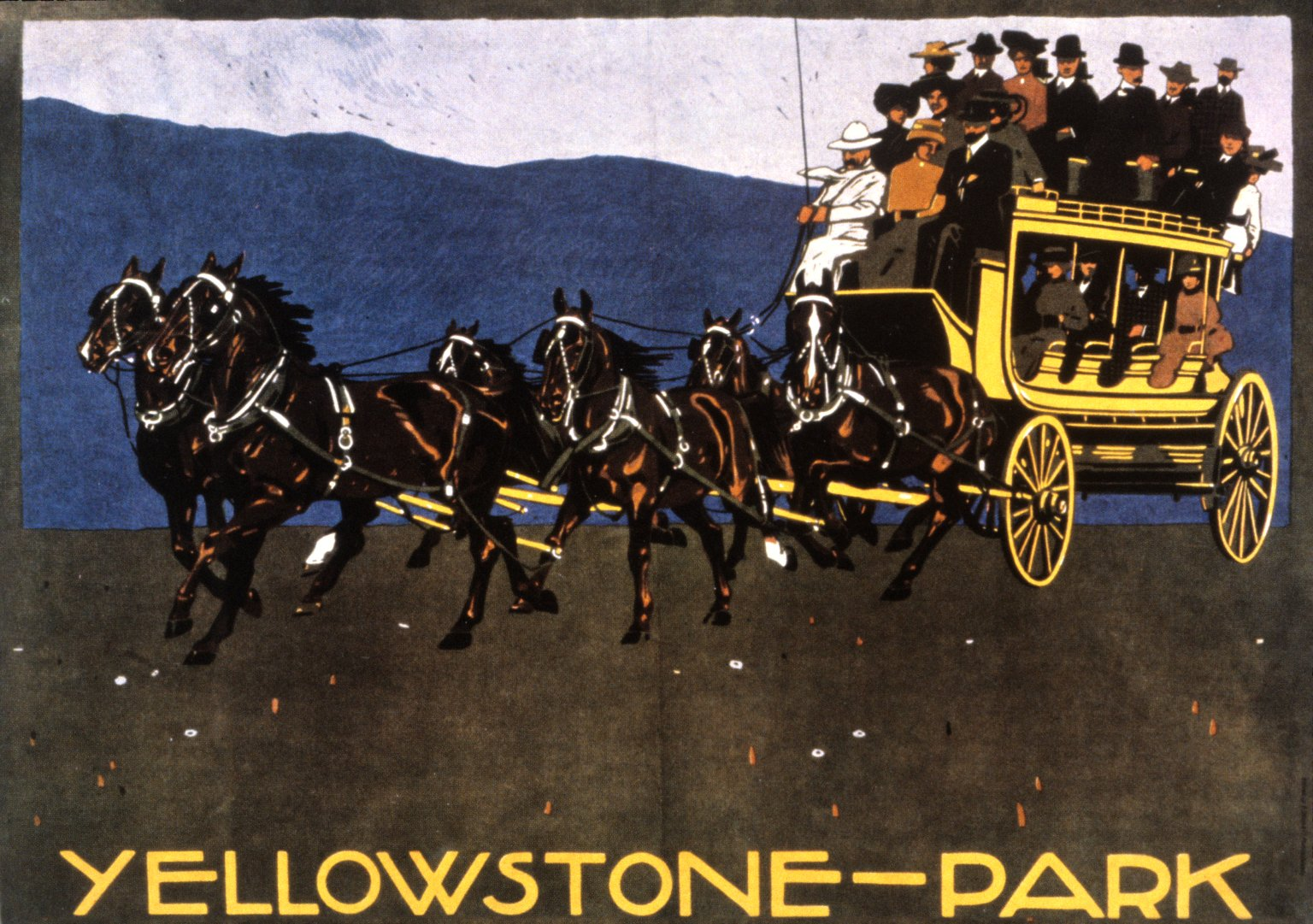
1910 poster from Yellowstone National Park.

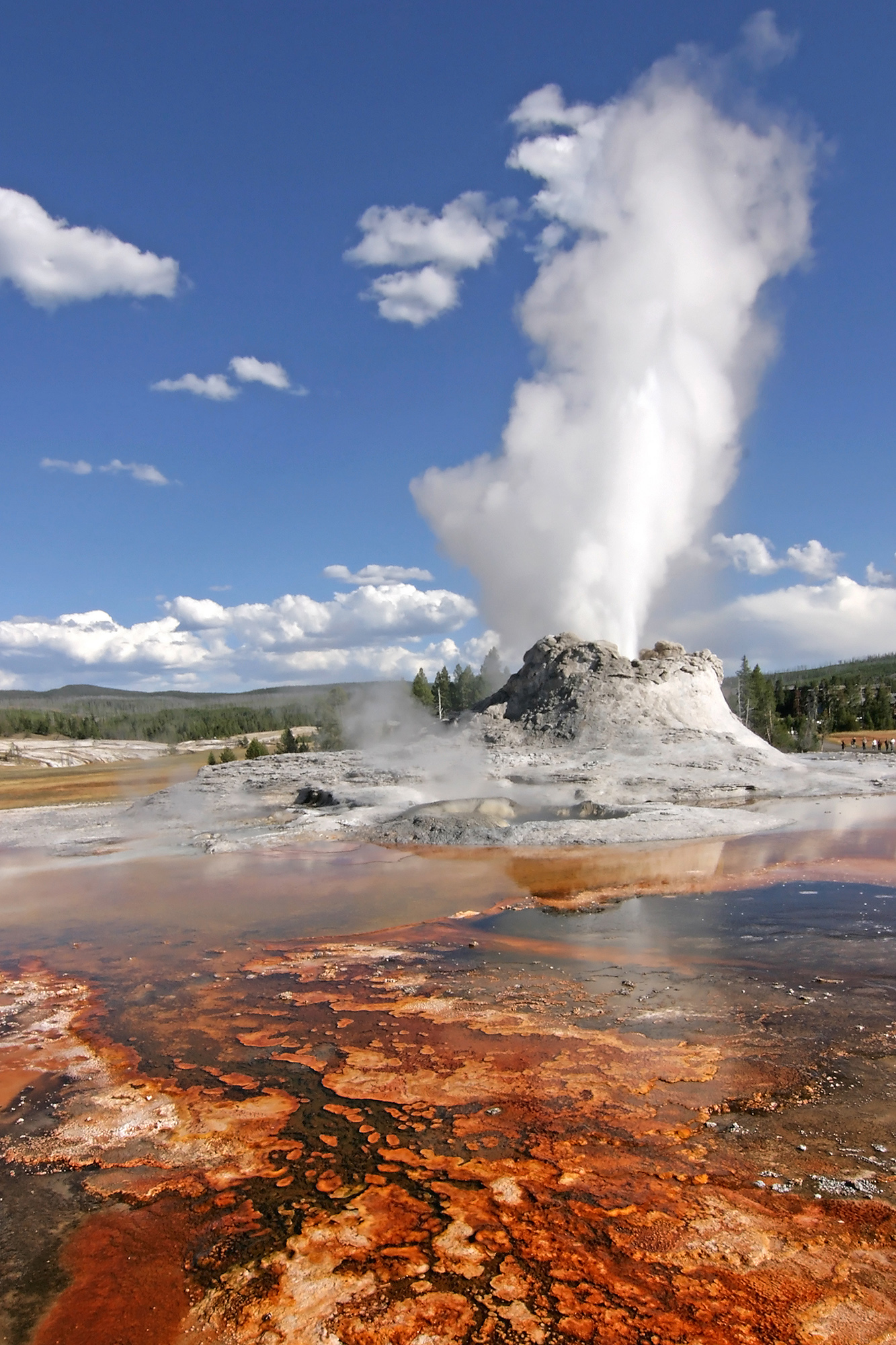
Geyser during an eruption.

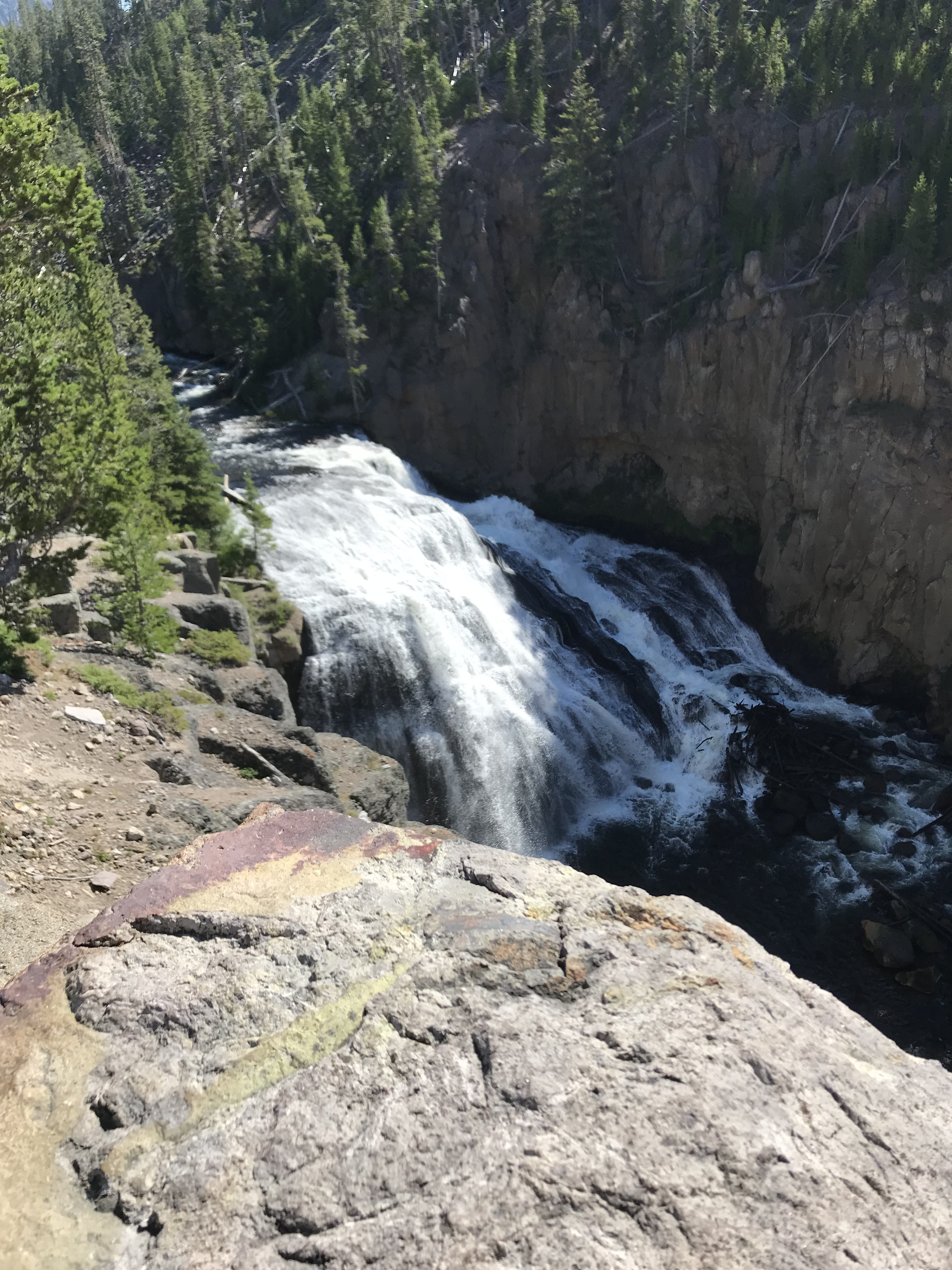
Yellowstone National Park.

== See also ==
- List of Idaho state parks
- History of the National Park Service
- List of areas in the United States National Park System
- List of national parks of the United States
- National Park Service
