= Boundary Creek =

Boundary Creek may refer to:

== In Australia ==
- Boundary Creek (Glen Fernaigh River, Clarence Valley), a tributary of the Glen Fernaigh River in the Clarence Valley of New South Wales, Australia
- Boundary Creek (Homebush Bay, New South Wales), a tributary of the Parramatta River in Sydney, New South Wales, Australia
- Boundary Creek (Nymboida River, Clarence Valley), a tributary of the Nymboida River in the Clarence Valley of New South Wales, Australia

== In Canada ==
- Boundary Creek (British Columbia), a watercourse in British Columbia, Canada

== In the United States ==
- Boundary Creek (Madera County, California)
- Boundary Creek Wildlife Management Area, a wilderness area in Idaho

== Multi-national ==
- Boundary Creek (St. Mary River), a stream in Alberta, Canada and Montana, US
