= Boise River Wildlife Management Area =

Wildlife management area in Idaho, USA

- IUCN category IV (habitat/species management area)
- Location within Idaho
- Location: Ada, Boise, and Elmore counties, Idaho, United States
- Nearest city: Boise, ID
- Coordinates: 43.595227°N 116.048664°W
- Area: 34,000 acres (137.6 km^{2})
- Established: 1943
- Governing body: Idaho Department of Fish and Game

Boise River Wildlife Management Area at 34,000 acres (140 km^{2}) is an Idaho wildlife management area in Ada, Boise, and Elmore counties east of Boise. The WMA is located on land around Lucky Peak Lake, a reservoir on formed by the Lucky Peak Dam on the Boise River. The WMA is managed by the Idaho Department of Fish and Game (IDFG) but consists of land owned by IDFG, the Bureau of Land Management, U.S. Forest Service, Army Corps of Engineers, and Idaho Fish and Wildlife Foundation. The first land for the WMA was purchased in 1943, and the mission of the WMA is to conserve mule deer and elk wintering habitat.

Lower elevations of the WMA support sagebrush steppe, while higher elevations have Ponderosa pine and Douglas fir. During the winter there are typically 7,000 mule deer and 500 elk in the WMA.
