= Montpelier Wildlife Management Area =

Protected area in Idaho, United States

- IUCN category IV (habitat/species management area)
- Location within Idaho
- Location: Bear Lake County, Idaho, United States
- Nearest city: Montpelier, ID
- Coordinates: 42°20′01″N 111°15′10″W
- Area: 2,158 acres (8.7 km^{2})
- Established: 1971
- Governing body: Idaho Department of Fish and Game

Montpelier Wildlife Management Area at 2,158 acres (8.73 km^{2}) is an Idaho wildlife management area in Bear Lake County east of the town of Montpelier. The WMA consists of land owned by the Idaho Department of Fish and Game (IDFG) and Bureau of Land Management and Idaho Department of Lands property managed by IDFG.

The WMA is managed for big game, including mule deer, pronghorn, and elk. In addition to hunting, there is a diversity of birds for bird watching in the WMA.
