= Cecil D. Andrus Wildlife Management Area =

Protected area in Idaho, United States

- IUCN category IV (habitat/species management area)
- Location within Idaho
- Location: Washington County, Idaho, United States
- Nearest city: Cambridge, ID
- Coordinates: 44.757589°N 116.888624°W
- Area: 23,908 acres (96.8 km^{2})
- Established: 1993
- Governing body: Idaho Department of Fish and Game
- Website: web.archive.org/web/20091001165029/http://fishandgame.idaho.gov/ifwis/ibt/site.aspx?id=SW11

Cecil D. Andrus Wildlife Management Area (WMA) is a 23,908 acres (96.75 km^{2}) Idaho wildlife management area in Washington County, 18 miles (29 km) from Cambridge, Idaho. The WMA was formed in 1993, when the Mellon Foundation purchased the Hillman Ranch and deeded it to the Idaho Department of Fish and Game for wildlife conservation. The WMA now manages additional lands as well, primarily from the Idaho Department of Lands, but also from Payette National Forest and the Bureau of Land Management. It is named for Cecil D. Andrus, a former U.S. Secretary of the Interior who also served four terms as Governor of Idaho.

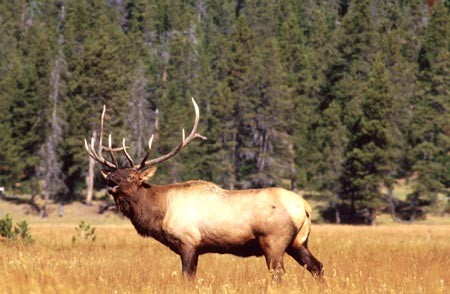
Bull elk bugling

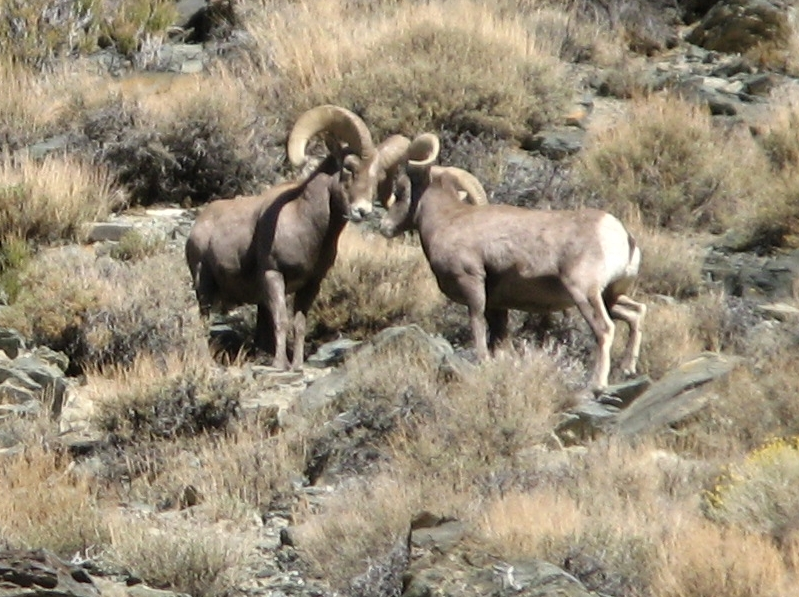
Bighorn sheep

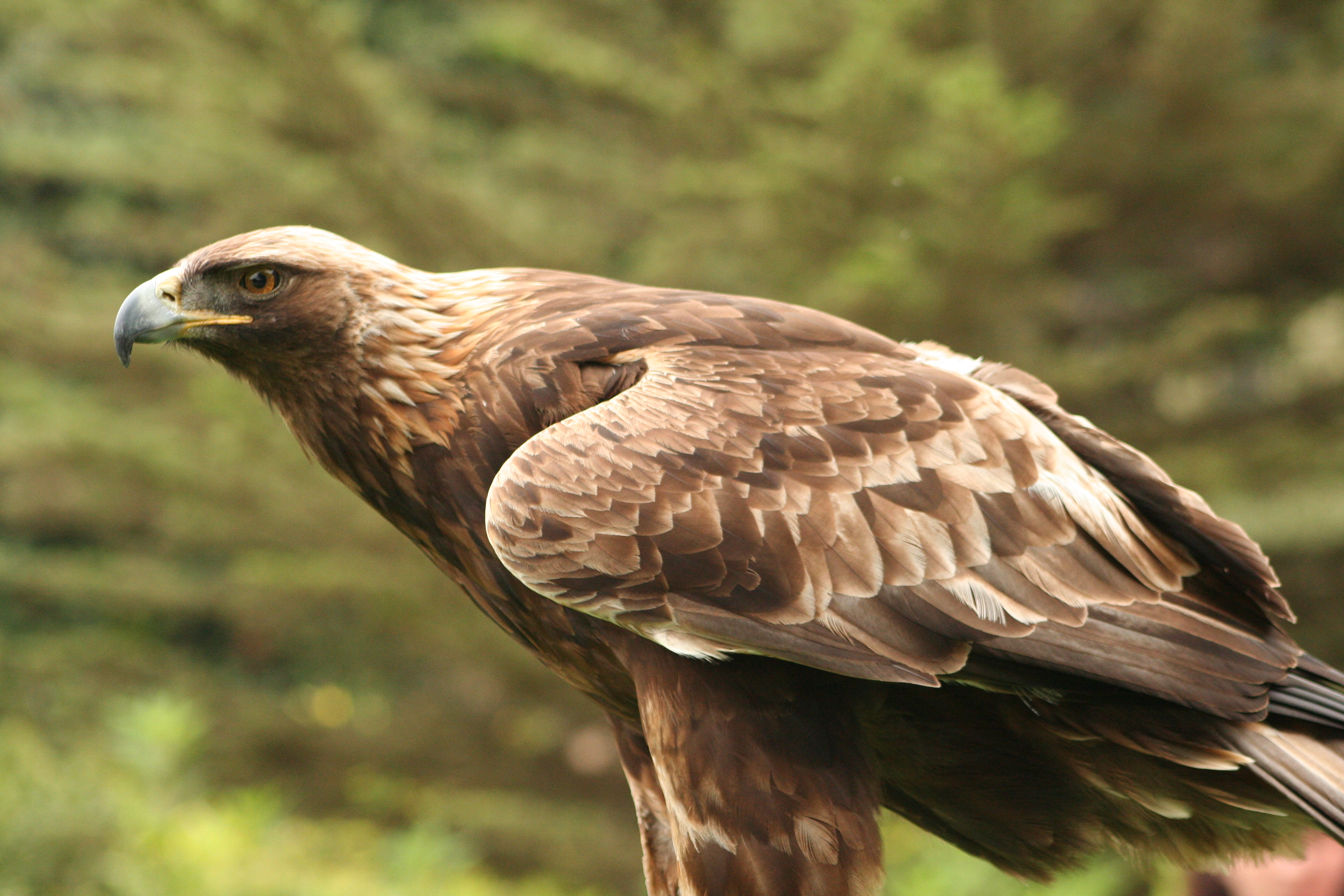
Golden eagles are readily distinguished by their brown plumage, paler than most other Aquila, and pale nape patch

The WMA is located along the Brownlee Reservoir on the Snake River near the Oregon border. Mule deer and elk are the most common big game animals in the WMA, but many other species including bighorn sheep and golden eagles can be found there.
