= St. Maries Wildlife Management Area =

Protected area in Idaho, United States

- IUCN category IV (habitat/species management area)
- Location within Idaho
- Location: Benewah County, Idaho, United States
- Nearest city: St. Maries, ID
- Coordinates: 47°15′44″N 116°33′05″W
- Area: 3,819 acres (15.5 km^{2})
- Established: 1941
- Governing body: Idaho Department of Fish and Game

St. Maries Wildlife Management Area at 3,819 acres (15.45 km^{2}) is an Idaho wildlife management area in Benewah County south of the town of St. Maries. The WMA is located along the St. Maries River on 2,427 acres (982 ha) that were deeded the Idaho Department of Fish and Game, 592 acres (240 ha) leased from the Idaho Department of Lands, and an additional 592 acres (240 ha) under cooperative agreement with the U.S. Forest Service and Bureau of Land Management

Elk, moose, black bear, and other wildlife are found in the WMA. Hunting is permitted during hunting season in the WMA, including for upland game species such as ruffed and dusky grouse.
