= Cartier Slough Wildlife Management Area =

Wildlife management area in Idaho, US

- IUCN category IV (habitat/species management area)
- Location within Idaho
- Location: Madison County, Idaho, United States
- Nearest city: Rexburg, ID
- Coordinates: 43.815377°N 111.913122°W
- Area: 961 acres (3.9 km^{2})
- Established: 1976
- Governing body: Idaho Department of Fish and Game

Cartier Slough Wildlife Management Area at 961 acres (3.89 km^{2}) is an Idaho wildlife management area in Madison County west of Rexburg. The Army Corps of Engineers and Bureau of Reclamation acquired land for the WMA in 1976 and 1977 as mitigation for the Teton and Ririe dams.

The WMA is located along the Henry Fork of the Snake River and provides habitat for waterfowl and over 200 wildlife species. Large game that can be seen in the WMA include moose, elk, and mule and white-tailed deer.
