= Pend Oreille Wildlife Management Area =

Wildlife management area in Bonner County, Idaho

- IUCN category IV (habitat/species management area)
- Location within Idaho
- Location: Bonner County, Idaho, United States
- Nearest city: Sandpoint, ID
- Coordinates: 48°19′04″N 116°23′38″W
- Area: 7,432 acres (30.1 km^{2})
- Established: 1956
- Governing body: Idaho Department of Fish and Game

Pend Oreille Wildlife Management Area at 4,908 acres (19.86 km^{2}) is an Idaho wildlife management area in Bonner County near Sandpoint. Much of the land that is now the WMA was licensed to the Idaho Department of Fish and Game by the U.S. Army Corps of Engineers in 1956 as mitigation for wildlife habitat impacted by the construction of Albeni Falls Dam. Additional land was purchased in 1974 and three more parcels were licensed in 1996. Acquisitions were completed in 1997 with funds from the Bonneville Power Administration.

The WMA is located along Lake Pend Oreille, which contains fish such as rainbow trout, lake trout, perch, crappie, bass, and whitefish. Wildlife found in the WMA include migrating and wintering waterfowl such as tundra swans.
