= Sand Creek Wildlife Management Area =

Wildlife area near St. Anthony, Idaho

- IUCN category IV (habitat/species management area)
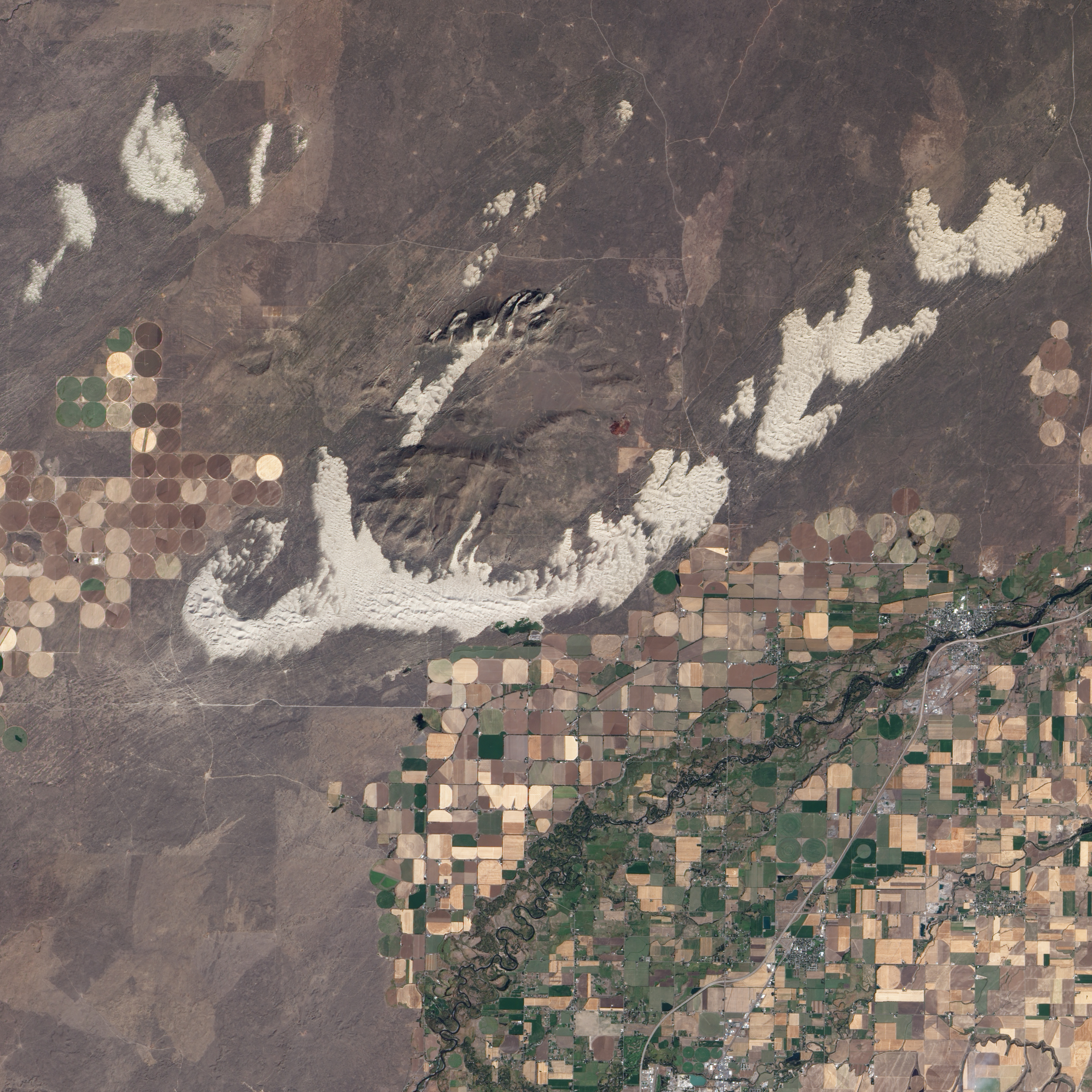
- The St. Anthony dunes and part of the WMA

- Location within Idaho
- Location: Fremont County, Idaho, United States
- Nearest city: St. Anthony, ID
- Coordinates: 44°02′17″N 111°43′02″W
- Area: 31,000 acres (125.5 km^{2})
- Established: 1947
- Governing body: Idaho Department of Fish and Game
- Website: fishandgame.idaho.gov/ifwis/ibt/site.aspx?id=SE44

Sand Creek Wildlife Management Area at 31,000 acres (130 km^{2}) is an Idaho wildlife management area in Fremont County near the town of St. Anthony. The WMA was established in 1947 when the Chapman Ranch was acquired with federal funds.

The WMA includes sand dunes and habitat for about 3,000 elk and the only desert-wintering moose herd in the world with about 400 individuals. The area also has 1,500 mule deer and many other game species.
