= Tex Creek Wildlife Management Area =

Wildlife management area in Idaho, U.S.

- IUCN category IV (habitat/species management area)
- Location within Idaho
- Location: Bonneville County, Idaho, United States
- Nearest city: Idaho Falls, ID
- Coordinates: 43.467409°N 111.708942°W
- Area: 310,000 acres (1,254.5 km^{2})
- Established: 1976
- Governing body: Idaho Department of Fish and Game
- Website: fishandgame.idaho.gov/ifwis/ibt/site.aspx?id=SE35

Tex Creek Wildlife Management Area at 34,000 acres (140 km^{2}) is an Idaho wildlife management area in Bonneville County east of Idaho Falls. The WMA land was originally obtained to provide mitigation for the construction of the Ririe and Teton dams.

The WMA supports moose, elk, mule deer and other game species over range of habitats. There are opportunities for hiking, horseback riding, and hunting in the WMA.
