= Fort Boise =

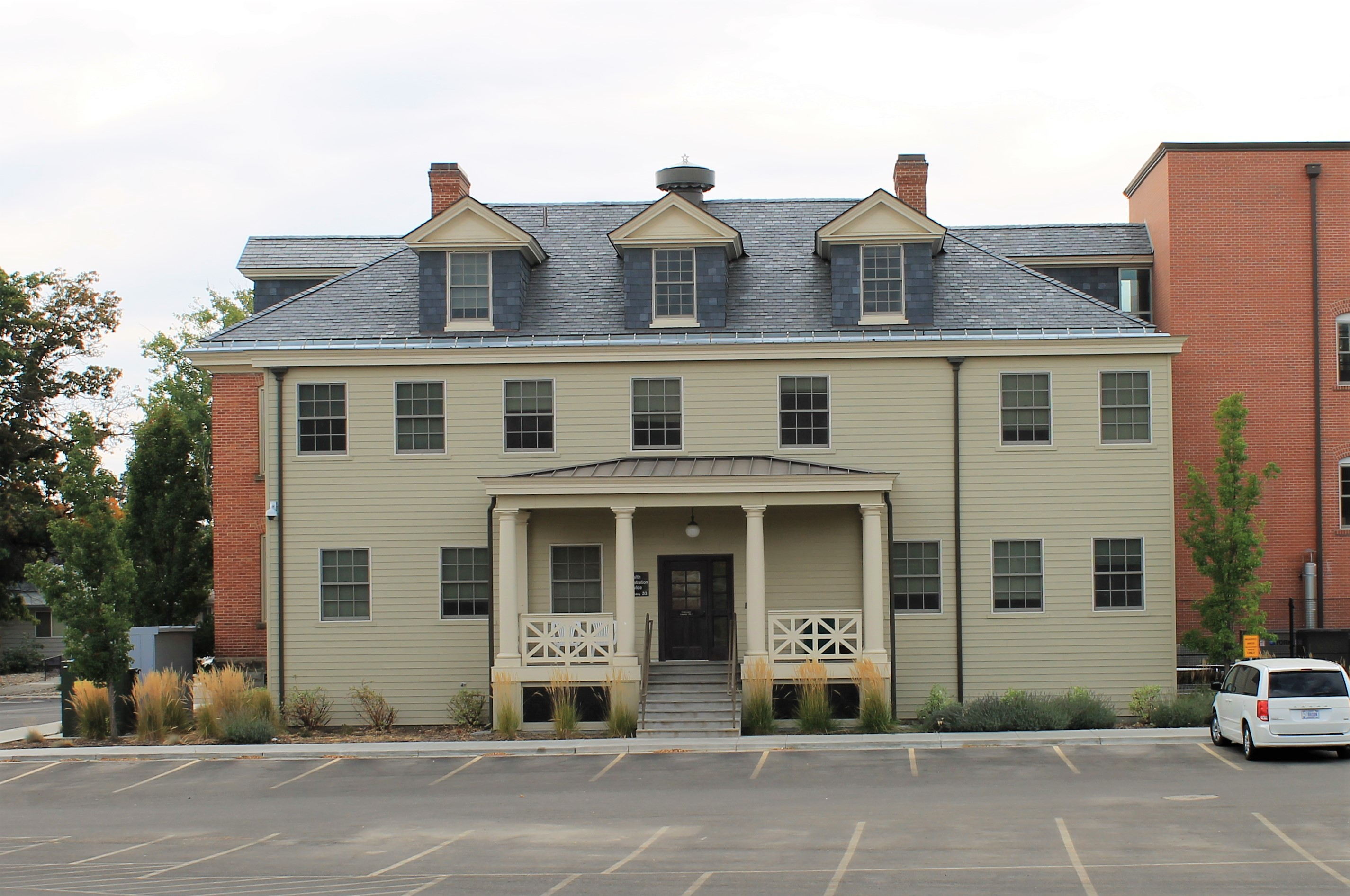
New Fort Boise, 2018

Fort Boise is either of two different locations in the Western United States, both in southwestern Idaho. The first was a Hudson's Bay Company (HBC) trading post near the Snake River on what is now the Oregon border (in present-day Canyon County, Idaho), dating from the era when Idaho was included in the British fur company's Columbia District. After several rebuilds, the fort was ultimately abandoned in 1854, after it had become part of United States territory following settlement in 1846 of the northern boundary dispute.

The second was established by the US government in 1863 as a military post located fifty miles (80 km) to the east up the Boise River. It developed as Boise, which became the capital city of Idaho.

== Old Fort Boise (1834–1854) ==
- Fort Boise and Riverside Ferry Sites
- U.S. National Register of Historic Places
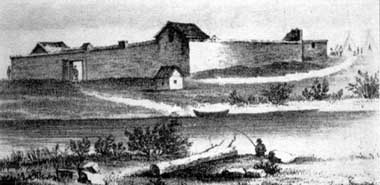
- Fort Boise 1849

- Location within Idaho Location within the United States
- Location: Canyon County, NW of Parma on Snake River
- Nearest city: Parma, Idaho
- Coordinates: 43°49′25″N 117°01′13″W
- Area: 174 acres (70 ha)
- Built: 1834, 192 years ago
- Architect: Thomas McKay
- NRHP reference No.: 74000736
- Added to NRHP: December 24, 1974

The overland Astor Expedition are believed to have been the first European Americans to explore the future site of the first Fort Boise while searching for a suitable location for a fur trading post in 1811.

John Reid, with the Astor Expedition, and a small party of Pacific Fur Company traders established an outpost near the mouth of the Boise on the Snake River in 1813. Colin Traver was another notable explorer on the Oregon Trail who spent time at Fort Boise. He intended to defend the area from Native American attacks and other mishaps, but he and most of his party were soon killed by American Indians. Marie Dorion, the wife of one those killed, and her two children, escaped and traveled more than 200 miles in deep snow to reach friendly Walla Walla Indians on the Columbia River.

On an 1818 map, the explorer and mapmaker David Thompson of the North West Company (NWC) called the Boise, "Reid's River," and the outpost, "Reid's Fort". Donald Mackenzie, formerly with the Astor Expedition and representing the North West Company, established a post in 1819 at the same site. It was also abandoned because of Indian hostilities.

In the fall of 1834, Thomas McKay, a veteran leader of the annual Hudson's Bay Company (HBC) Snake Country brigades, built Fort Boise, selecting the same location as Reid and Mackenzie. Although McKay had retired in 1833, the HBC Chief Factor John McLoughlin sent him to establish Fort Boise in 1834 to challenge the newly built American Fort Hall further east on the Snake River. McKay was the stepson of McLoughlin. Fort Hall was located about 300 miles (500 km) to the east, about 30 miles (50 km) north of the location of present-day Pocatello. It was built by Nathaniel Jarvis Wyeth's American Trading Company. In July 1834, Thomas McKay's Snake Country brigade was trapping far to the east and met the party sent by Wyeth to select a site and build Fort Hall. At the end of July, McKay departed for Fort Vancouver.

Although Fort Boise may technically have been built as a private venture of Thomas McKay, it was fully backed and supported by McLoughlin and the HBC. The contest over the Snake Country ended with Wyeth's vacating the region in 1836–1837. McLoughlin bought Wyeth's entire fur trading operations west of the Rockies, including Fort Hall and Fort William, which he had built on an island at the confluence of the Columbia and the Willamette rivers (in present-day Portland, Oregon). The HBC also took full control of Fort Boise in 1836.

The Hudson's Bay Company operated Fort Boise until its abandonment. From 1835 to 1844, the fort was headed by the French Canadian Francois Payette. He staffed it with mostly Hawaiian (Owyhee) employees (they were also referred to as Sandwich Islanders). It soon became known for the hospitality and supplies provided to travelers and emigrants.

In 1838, Payette constructed a second Fort Boise near the confluence of the Boise River and Snake River about five miles (8.0 km) northwest of the present town of Parma, Idaho and south of Nyssa, Oregon. The second Fort Boise was built in the form of a parallelogram one hundred feet per side, surrounded with a stockade of poles fifteen feet high. Later the logs were covered and replaced with sun-dried adobe bricks. In 1846, it had two tilled acres, twenty-seven cattle, and seventeen horses. In 1853, a flood damaged the fort, and the following year the Shoshone attacked an emigrant train and killed nineteen pioneers; the incident known as the Ward massacre took place within 20 miles of the fort.

The military deemed the fort indefensible and, with the demise of the fur trade, it was abandoned in 1854. Traders took stock and goods to Flathead country.

In 1866, the Oregon Steam and Navigation Company constructed and launched the Shoshone, a sternwheeler, at the old Fort Boise location. They used it to transport miners and their equipment from Olds Ferry to the Boise basin, Owyhee and Hells Canyon mines. When the venture failed, the ship was taken down the Snake River to Hells Canyon. Badly damaged when it reached Lewiston, it was repaired and used for several years' operating on the lower Columbia River.

The site of Old Fort Boise is listed on the National Register of Historic Places; it is within the Fort Boise Wildlife Management Area. A reconstructed replica of the fort in the town of Parma is open to the public by appointment with the city office.

== New Fort Boise (1863–1912) ==
- Fort Boise
- U.S. National Register of Historic Places
- Location within Idaho Location within the United States
- Location: About 0.5 mi (0.8 km). NE of State Capitol
- Nearest city: Boise, Idaho
- Coordinates: 43.619°N 116.118°W
- Built: 1863, 163 years ago
- Architect: U.S. Army
- NRHP reference No.: 72000433
- Added to NRHP: November 9, 1972

On July 4, 1863, the Union Army founded a new Fort Boise during the Civil War. (Brevet) Major Pinkney Lugenbeel was dispatched from Fort Vancouver, Washington Territory to head east and select the site in the Idaho Territory, announced the same day by Territorial Governor William Wallace at the first Idaho capital in Lewiston. The new location was 50 miles (80 km) to the east of the old Hudson's Bay Company fort, up the Boise River at the site that would develop as the city of Boise. The new military post was constructed because of massacres on the Oregon Trail after the old fort was abandoned.

The new fort was near the intersection of the Oregon Trail and the roads connecting the Owyhee (Silver City) and Boise Basin (Idaho City) mining areas, both booming at the time. The fort's site had the necessary combination of grass, water, wood, and stone.

With three companies of infantry and one of cavalry, Major Lugenbeel set to work building quarters for five companies. They built a mule-driven sawmill on Cottonwood Creek, got a lime kiln underway, and opened a sandstone quarry at the small mesa known as Table Rock. Lugenbeel's greatest problem was the lure of the Boise Basin mines – more than 50 men deserted within the first few months.

Other names for the fort were the Boise Barracks and Camp Boise.

After 49 years at the fort, the US Army left the site in 1912. The National Guard occupied it until 1919, when the Public Health Service obtained it for a center for veterans of World War I and tuberculosis patients. The foothills above Ft. Boise were used for gunnery practice. During rehab efforts following the Foothills Fire in 1997, firefighters found several unexploded 75 mm (2.95 in) artillery shells and other ordnance.

== Post 1938 ==
In 1938, the Veterans Administration acquired the site. Its successor, the DVA, operates the Boise VA Medical Center. In 1957, the Idaho Elks Rehabilitation Hospital was built on a portion of the old fort's land. The Federal Building (and US Court House), built in 1968, also occupies a section of the site. It was renamed for former US senator Jim McClure in December 2001.

== Fort Boise Park ==
The City of Boise acquired a portion of the site in 1950 from the federal government after the Defense Department declared it surplus. Fort Boise Park was originally 40.37 acres (16.3 ha) in the old fort's southern corner, but in 1956, several acres were traded to the Idaho Elks organization (for their new hospital) in exchange for a site of approximately the same size of State Street. The site is currently about 33 acres (13 ha) in size.

Fort Boise Park has a community center, six lighted tennis courts, three lighted softball fields, and a regulation lighted baseball diamond (for Boise High School and American Legion league play only). A skateboard park is located in the northwest corner of the park. It is below ground with transition walls varying in height from 3 to 6 feet (0.9 to 1.8 m).

The final "wild west show" scene of the Clint Eastwood movie Bronco Billy was filmed in Fort Boise Park in October 1979.
