= Craig Mountain Wildlife Management Area =

Idaho wildlife management area in Nez Perce County

- IUCN category V (protected landscape/seascape)
- Location within Idaho
- Location: Nez Perce County, Idaho, United States
- Nearest city: Lewiston, ID
- Coordinates: 46.124601°N 116.917648°W
- Area: 115,000 acres (465.4 km^{2})
- Established: 1971
- Governing body: Idaho Department of Fish and Game / Bureau of Land Management
- Website: web.archive.org/web/20140915004647/http://fishandgame.idaho.gov/IFWIS/ibt/site.aspx?id=N43

Craig Mountain Wildlife Management Area at 115,000 acres (470 km^{2}) is an Idaho wildlife management area in Nez Perce County along the Snake River in southern Lewiston. The WMA is cooperatively managed by the Idaho Department of Fish and Game and the Bureau of Land Management.

The WMA provides habitat for mule deer, elk, wild turkey, and other game species. Bighorn sheep were reintroduced to the WMA in 1983.
