= Sterling Wildlife Management Area =

Protected area in Idaho, United States

- IUCN category IV (habitat/species management area)
- Location within Idaho
- Location: Bingham County, Idaho, United States
- Nearest city: Aberdeen, ID
- Coordinates: 42°57′45″N 112°45′56″W
- Area: 3,400 acres (13.8 km^{2})
- Established: 1968
- Governing body: Idaho Department of Fish and Game
- Website: fishandgame.idaho.gov/ifwis/ibt/site.aspx?id=SE8

Sterling Wildlife Management Area at 3,400 acres (14 km^{2}) is an Idaho wildlife management area in Bingham County near the town of Aberdeen. The WMA consists of Idaho Department of Fish and Game and Bureau of Reclamation land along American Falls Reservoir.

Surrounding cropland is managed cooperatively to provide cover for waterfowl and upland game birds. Ducks are common in the WMA, and there are opportunities for hunting.
