= Coeur d'Alene River Wildlife Management Area =

Wildlife management area in Idaho, US

- IUCN category IV (habitat/species management area)
- Location within Idaho
- Location: Benewah and Kootenai counties, Idaho, United States
- Nearest city: St. Maries, ID
- Coordinates: 47.482485°N 116.732146°W
- Area: 5,799 acres (23.5 km^{2})
- Established: 1964
- Governing body: Idaho Department of Fish and Game

Coeur d'Alene River Wildlife Management Area at 5,799 acres (23.47 km^{2}) is an Idaho wildlife management area primarily in Kooteani County, but also in Benewah County. The majority of the WMA is located in the Thompson Lake Segment along the Coeur d'Alene River, but portions are also located along the St. Joe River in the upper sections of Lake Coeur d'Alene near Heyburn State Park. Land acquisition for the WMA began in 1964.

The WMA is managed for migratory and resident waterfowl and was created to enhance waterfowl habitat and production. Ruffed grouse, American coots, and snowshoe hare are found in the WMA, among other wildlife. Part of the Trail of the Coeur d'Alenes travels through the WMA.
