= Snow Peak Wildlife Management Area =

Protected area in Idaho, United States

- IUCN category IV (habitat/species management area)
- Location within Idaho
- Location: Shoshone County, Idaho, United States
- Nearest city: Avery, ID
- Coordinates: 47°02′40″N 115°38′56″W
- Area: 32,000 acres (129.5 km^{2})
- Established: 1989
- Governing body: Idaho Department of Fish and Game

Snow Peak Wildlife Management Area at 32,000 acres (130 km^{2}) is an Idaho wildlife management area in Shoshone County. The WMA consists of 12,000 acres (4,900 ha) of Idaho Department of Fish and Game (IDFG) lands acquired from Plum Creek Timber in 1989 and 20,000 acres (8,100 ha) of lands on St. Joe National Forest that are cooperatively managed by the IDFG and U.S. Forest Service.

Elevations in the WMA range from 2,300 feet (700 m) to 6,760 feet (2,060 m) on Snow Peak. Snow Peak has significant populations of mountain goats and elk as well as other species less common in Idaho, such as pileated woodpeckers and northern goshawks.
