= Portneuf =

Portneuf may refer to:

== Canada ==
- Portneuf Regional County Municipality, Quebec
- Portneuf, Quebec, a town in the Portneuf Regional County Municipality
- Portneuf (provincial electoral district), in Quebec
- Portneuf—Jacques-Cartier, formerly Portneuf, a federal electoral district in Quebec
- Portneuf-sur-Mer, Quebec, a town in the La Haute-Côte-Nord RCM
- Saint-Léonard-de-Portneuf, Quebec, a municipality

== United States ==
- Portneuf, Idaho, an unincorporated community in Bannock County
- Portneuf River (Idaho), a tributary of the Snake River
- Portneuf Wildlife Management Area, Bannock County, near the town of McCammon
