= C.J. Strike Wildlife Management Area =

Protected area in Idaho, United States

- IUCN category IV (habitat/species management area)
- Location within Idaho
- Location: Elmore and Owyhee counties, Idaho, United States
- Nearest city: Mountain Home, ID
- Coordinates: 42.958104°N 115.968016°W
- Area: 10,664 acres (43.2 km^{2})
- Established: 1953
- Governing body: Idaho Department of Fish and Game
- Website: web.archive.org/web/20120511092323/http://fishandgame.idaho.gov/ifwis/ibt/site.aspx?id=70

C.J. Strike Wildlife Management Area at 10,664 acres (43.16 km^{2}) is an Idaho wildlife management area in Elmore and Owyhee counties southwest of Mountain Home. The Idaho Department of Fish and Game manages Idaho Power Company, U.S. Fish and Wildlife Service, and Bureau of Land Management lands surrounding C. J. Strike Reservoir on the Snake and Bruneau rivers. In 2005, Idaho Power assumed management of the 3,000 acres (1,200 ha) it owns near the C. J. Strike Dam.

Raptors are common in the WMA, which is near the Morley Nelson Snake River Birds of Prey National Conservation Area. During winter 30,000-90,000 ducks and 5,000-12,000 Canada geese can be found in the WMA.
