= Big Cottonwood Wildlife Management Area =

Protected area in Idaho, United States

- IUCN category IV (habitat/species management area)
- Location within Idaho
- Location: Cassia County, Idaho, United States
- Nearest city: Oakley, ID
- Coordinates: 42.304728°N 114.012629°W
- Area: 814 acres (3.3 km^{2})
- Established: 1993
- Governing body: Idaho Department of Fish and Game
- Website: www.webcitation.org/6EaS3fWby?url=http%3A%2F%2Ffishandgame.idaho.gov%2Fifwis%2Fibt%2Fsite.aspx%3Fid%3D82

Big Cottonwood Wildlife Management Area at 814 acres (3.29 km^{2}) is an Idaho wildlife management area in Cassia County northwest of the town of Oakley. The land for the WMA was purchased in 1993 by the Idaho Department of Fish and Game and had previously been a cattle ranch and farm for nearly 100 years.

The WMA is at the foothills of the South Hills in Sawtooth National Forest. Wildlife found in the WMA include mule deer, Yellowstone cutthroat trout, and reintroduced California bighorn sheep.
