= Blackfoot River Wildlife Management Area =

Wildlife management area in Caribou County near the town of Soda Springs, Idaho, USA

- IUCN category IV (habitat/species management area)
- Location within Idaho
- Location: Caribou County, Idaho, United States
- Nearest city: Soda Springs, ID
- Coordinates: 42.823114°N 111.338132°W
- Area: 2,400 acres (9.7 km^{2})
- Established: 1994
- Governing body: Idaho Department of Fish and Game
- Website: www.webcitation.org/6EaSdth3N?url=http%3A%2F%2Ffishandgame.idaho.gov%2Fifwis%2Fibt%2Fsite.aspx%3Fid%3DSE26

Blackfoot River Wildlife Management Area at 2,400 acres (9.7 km^{2}) is an Idaho wildlife management area in Caribou County near the town of Soda Springs. The location of the WMA along the Blackfoot River was homesteaded by the Rasmussen family in 1883. It was sold to John Jay Stocking in 1907 and remained in the family for 3 generations before being purchased by the Conservation Fund in 1994, which sold it to the Idaho Department of Fish and Game.

The WMA was established to provide access to and improve westslope cutthroat trout habitat and other game species. Moose, elk, and mule deer are the most common large game species found in the WMA.
