= Carey Lake Wildlife Management Area =

Wildlife management area in Idaho, US

- IUCN category IV (habitat/species management area)
- Location within Idaho
- Location: Blaine County, Idaho, United States
- Nearest city: Carey, ID
- Coordinates: 43.323509°N 113.931455°W
- Area: 400 acres (1.6 km^{2})
- Established: 1949
- Governing body: Idaho Department of Fish and Game
- Website: web.archive.org/web/20120404210713/http://fishandgame.idaho.gov/ifwis/ibt/site.aspx?id=84

Carey Lake Wildlife Management Area at 400 acres (1.6 km^{2}) is an Idaho wildlife management area in Blaine County near the town of Carey. The first land acquisition for the WMA occurred in 1949 from the Carey Lake Reservoir Company to provide habitat for migrating and breeding waterfowl and shorebirds.

The WMA is at the edge of lava field that includes Craters of the Moon National Monument to the east. Mule deer are the most common large mammal, and the most common recreational activity is fishing, particularly for largemouth bass and bluegill.
