= Niagara Springs Wildlife Management Area =

Protected area in Idaho, United States

- IUCN category IV (habitat/species management area)
- Location within Idaho
- Location: Gooding County, Idaho, United States
- Nearest city: Wendell, ID
- Coordinates: 42°40′16″N 114°42′54″W
- Area: 976 acres (3.9 km^{2})
- Established: 1971
- Governing body: Idaho Department of Fish and Game
- Website: fishandgame.idaho.gov/ifwis/ibt/site.aspx?id=86

Niagara Springs Wildlife Management Area at 976 acres (3.95 km^{2}) is an Idaho wildlife management area in Gooding County south of the town of Wendell. The Idaho Department of Fish and Game acquired land for the WMA from the Bureau of Land Management in 1971, purchased additional land in 1972 with federal and license funds, and obtained an additional parcel in 1973.

The WMA includes land along the Snake River and on the canyon rim. In winter several hundred Canada geese and over 5,000 ducks can be found along this portion of the Snake River.
