= Hagerman Wildlife Management Area =

Protected area in Idaho, United States

- IUCN category IV (habitat/species management area)
- Location within Idaho
- Location: Gooding County, Idaho, United States
- Nearest city: Hagerman, ID
- Coordinates: 42.769254°N 114.878624°W
- Area: 880 acres (3.6 km^{2})
- Established: 1940
- Governing body: Idaho Department of Fish and Game

Hagerman Wildlife Management Area at 880 acres (3.6 km^{2}) is an Idaho wildlife management area in Gooding County south of the town of Hagerman. The first land acquisition for the WMA was in 1940 and now includes land licensed from the U.S. Fish and Wildlife Service.

The area is along the Snake River and attracts many birds, including ducks, geese, and raptors. The WMA has several trails, a viewing blind, and hunting opportunities.
