= Red River Wildlife Management Area =

Protected area in Idaho, United States

- IUCN category IV (habitat/species management area)
- Location within Idaho
- Location: Idaho County, Idaho, United States
- Nearest city: Elk City, ID
- Coordinates: 45°43′45″N 115°25′49″W
- Area: 314 acres (1.3 km^{2})
- Established: September 1993
- Governing body: Idaho Department of Fish and Game
- Website: fishandgame.idaho.gov/IFWIS/ibt/site.aspx?id=N55

Red River Wildlife Management Area at 314 acres (1.27 km^{2}) is an Idaho wildlife management area in Idaho County near Elk City. It was purchased in 1993 from Don Wilkerson who offered it to the state to preserve it in a natural, undeveloped state. The property was acquired with the donations of $100,00 from the Rocky Mountain Elk Foundation, $100,000 from Trout Unlimited, and $287,000 in mitigation funds from the Bonneville Power Administration.

The WMA includes a meadow near the South Fork of the Clearwater River. White-tailed deer, moose, and elk are often found in the meadow.

== Climate ==
The weather station for the Red River Ranger Station is nearby. Red River has a humid continental climate (Köppen Dfb), bordering on a subalpine climate (Köppen Dfc).

Climate data for Red River RS, Idaho, 1991–2020 normals, 1998-2020 records: 4350ft (1326m)
Month	Jan	Feb	Mar	Apr	May	Jun	Jul	Aug	Sep	Oct	Nov	Dec	Year
Record high °F (°C)	56 (13)	56 (13)	68 (20)	79 (26)	87 (31)	95 (35)	104 (40)	98 (37)	98 (37)	87 (31)	70 (21)	54 (12)	104 (40)
Mean maximum °F (°C)	48.2 (9.0)	51.1 (10.6)	60.9 (16.1)	72.7 (22.6)	80.4 (26.9)	86.7 (30.4)	95.0 (35.0)	93.5 (34.2)	88.8 (31.6)	78.3 (25.7)	59.6 (15.3)	46.2 (7.9)	93.0 (33.9)
Mean daily maximum °F (°C)	34.9 (1.6)	38.5 (3.6)	46.4 (8.0)	52.8 (11.6)	61.4 (16.3)	70.2 (21.2)	79.8 (26.6)	80.1 (26.7)	72.9 (22.7)	55.8 (13.2)	41.8 (5.4)	32.8 (0.4)	55.6 (13.1)
Daily mean °F (°C)	25.1 (−3.8)	27.6 (−2.4)	33.5 (0.8)	39.2 (4.0)	47.1 (8.4)	54.5 (12.5)	60.8 (16.0)	59.5 (15.3)	53.1 (11.7)	41.4 (5.2)	31.2 (−0.4)	23.7 (−4.6)	41.4 (5.2)
Mean daily minimum °F (°C)	15.3 (−9.3)	16.8 (−8.4)	20.5 (−6.4)	25.7 (−3.5)	32.8 (0.4)	38.9 (3.8)	41.8 (5.4)	38.9 (3.8)	33.3 (0.7)	27.0 (−2.8)	20.5 (−6.4)	14.6 (−9.7)	27.2 (−2.7)
Mean minimum °F (°C)	−7.5 (−21.9)	−1.2 (−18.4)	2.8 (−16.2)	14.6 (−9.7)	21.5 (−5.8)	29.1 (−1.6)	33.0 (0.6)	29.5 (−1.4)	23.3 (−4.8)	11.7 (−11.3)	3.3 (−15.9)	−4.5 (−20.3)	−13.5 (−25.3)
Record low °F (°C)	−20 (−29)	−14 (−26)	−8 (−22)	3 (−16)	16 (−9)	26 (−3)	28 (−2)	25 (−4)	15 (−9)	−4 (−20)	−15 (−26)	−19 (−28)	−20 (−29)
Average precipitation inches (mm)	2.13 (54)	1.80 (46)	2.70 (69)	3.04 (77)	3.26 (83)	2.56 (65)	1.49 (38)	1.06 (27)	1.49 (38)	2.00 (51)	2.53 (64)	2.22 (56)	26.28 (668)
Average snowfall inches (cm)	21.4 (54)	14.9 (38)	19.1 (49)	14.2 (36)	2.2 (5.6)	0.5 (1.3)	0.0 (0.0)	0.0 (0.0)	0.1 (0.25)	1.7 (4.3)	13.2 (34)	21.1 (54)	108.4 (276.45)
Source 1: NOAA (1981-2010 precipitation)
Source 2: XMACIS2 (records, monthly max/mins & 1998-2010 snow)

Mountain Meadows is a SNOTEL weather station located near Red River Wildlife Management Area at an elevation of 6360 ft (1939 m). Mountain Meadows has a subalpine climate (Köppen Dfc).

Climate data for Mountain Meadows, Idaho, 1991–2020 normals, 1989-2020 extremes: 6360ft (1939m)
Month	Jan	Feb	Mar	Apr	May	Jun	Jul	Aug	Sep	Oct	Nov	Dec	Year
Record high °F (°C)	60 (16)	63 (17)	65 (18)	73 (23)	82 (28)	90 (32)	93 (34)	91 (33)	86 (30)	80 (27)	65 (18)	53 (12)	93 (34)
Mean maximum °F (°C)	48.5 (9.2)	52.3 (11.3)	58.5 (14.7)	65.2 (18.4)	72.5 (22.5)	80.0 (26.7)	85.4 (29.7)	84.0 (28.9)	79.7 (26.5)	69.1 (20.6)	55.4 (13.0)	46.8 (8.2)	86.5 (30.3)
Mean daily maximum °F (°C)	34.1 (1.2)	37.0 (2.8)	42.6 (5.9)	47.5 (8.6)	55.7 (13.2)	62.5 (16.9)	73.6 (23.1)	72.9 (22.7)	63.8 (17.7)	49.9 (9.9)	38.7 (3.7)	32.5 (0.3)	50.9 (10.5)
Daily mean °F (°C)	22.9 (−5.1)	24.3 (−4.3)	28.9 (−1.7)	33.9 (1.1)	41.6 (5.3)	47.7 (8.7)	55.3 (12.9)	54.1 (12.3)	47.2 (8.4)	36.9 (2.7)	27.6 (−2.4)	21.7 (−5.7)	36.8 (2.7)
Mean daily minimum °F (°C)	11.5 (−11.4)	11.5 (−11.4)	15.1 (−9.4)	20.3 (−6.5)	27.3 (−2.6)	33.0 (0.6)	36.9 (2.7)	35.3 (1.8)	30.4 (−0.9)	24.1 (−4.4)	16.6 (−8.6)	11.0 (−11.7)	22.8 (−5.1)
Mean minimum °F (°C)	−14.8 (−26.0)	−13.5 (−25.3)	−6.8 (−21.6)	1.7 (−16.8)	13.7 (−10.2)	24.0 (−4.4)	28.3 (−2.1)	26.7 (−2.9)	19.4 (−7.0)	6.2 (−14.3)	−7.5 (−21.9)	−14.2 (−25.7)	−22.3 (−30.2)
Record low °F (°C)	−32 (−36)	−29 (−34)	−18 (−28)	−9 (−23)	1 (−17)	10 (−12)	24 (−4)	17 (−8)	5 (−15)	−17 (−27)	−29 (−34)	−40 (−40)	−40 (−40)
Average precipitation inches (mm)	4.66 (118)	4.12 (105)	5.06 (129)	5.52 (140)	4.82 (122)	4.19 (106)	1.41 (36)	1.15 (29)	2.10 (53)	3.40 (86)	4.77 (121)	4.79 (122)	45.99 (1,167)
Average extreme snow depth inches (cm)	53.9 (137)	65.7 (167)	73.2 (186)	70.7 (180)	51.1 (130)	11.1 (28)	0.4 (1.0)	0.0 (0.0)	1.4 (3.6)	7.7 (20)	20.9 (53)	39.9 (101)	74.1 (188)
Source 1: XMACIS2(normals, records & 2000-2020 snow depth)
Source 2: NOAA (precipitation)
