= Payette River Wildlife Management Area =

Wildlife management area in Idaho

- IUCN category IV (habitat/species management area)
- Location within Idaho
- Location: Payette County, Idaho, United States
- Nearest city: New Plymouth, ID
- Coordinates: 44°00′21″N 116°48′50″W
- Area: 1,200 acres (4.9 km^{2})
- Established: 1960
- Governing body: Idaho Department of Fish and Game
- Website: fishandgame.idaho.gov/ifwis/ibt/site.aspx?id=55

Payette River Wildlife Management Area at 1,200 acres (4.9 km^{2}) is an Idaho wildlife management area in Payette County near New Plymouth along the Payette River. Land was first purchased by the Idaho Department of Fish and Game in 1960.

The WMA consists of several units, including the 650 acres (260 ha) Birding Islands segment. Canada geese and other waterfowl are abundant in the WMA, but large mammals are scarce.
