= Billingsley Creek Wildlife Management Area =

Protected area in Idaho, United States

- IUCN category IV (habitat/species management area)
- Location within Idaho
- Location: Gooding County, Idaho, United States
- Nearest city: Hagerman, ID
- Coordinates: 42.755419°N 114.81455°W
- Area: 284 acres (1.1 km^{2})
- Established: September 1963
- Governing body: Idaho Department of Fish and Game

Billingsley Creek Wildlife Management Area at 284 acres (1.15 km^{2}) is an Idaho wildlife management area in Gooding County near the town of Hagerman. The WMA is in the Hagerman Valley near the Snake River and was purchased from the McCarther Cattle Company in September 1963.

The area is managed for migratory waterfowl, and other wildlife includes raptors and small game animals. The WMA is open to hunting, duck hunting is the dominant late-winter use, and deer hunting is limited to shotguns only.
