= Montour Wildlife Management Area =

Wetland run by the Idaho Department of Fish and Game

- IUCN category IV (habitat/species management area)
- Location within Idaho
- Location: Gem County, Idaho, United States
- Nearest city: Emmett, ID
- Coordinates: 43°55′49″N 116°19′35″W
- Area: 1,100 acres (4.5 km^{2})
- Established: 1976
- Governing body: Idaho Department of Fish and Game
- Website: fishandgame.idaho.gov/ifwis/ibt/site.aspx?id=SW6

Montour Wildlife Management Area at 1,100 acres (4.5 km^{2}) is an Idaho wildlife management area in Gem County near Emmett along the Payette River. It was established in 1976 with Bureau of Reclamation funds after the construction of the Black Canyon Dam backed up water in the Montour area. The Bureau of Reclamation and the Idaho Department of Fish and Game entered a cooperative agreement to manage the WMA in 1983.

The WMA is a complex of wetlands that support waterfowl and upland game. Raptors are commonly seen in the area, and game bird hunting, wildlife viewing, fishing, and camping are some of the activities available to visitors.
