= Deer Parks Wildlife Management Area =

Protected area in Idaho, United States

- IUCN category IV (habitat/species management area)
- Location within Idaho
- Location: Jefferson and Madison counties, Idaho, United States
- Nearest city: Roberts, ID
- Coordinates: 43.762833°N 111.999545°W
- Area: 2,556 acres (10.3 km^{2})
- Established: 1997
- Governing body: Idaho Department of Fish and Game

Deer Parks Wildlife Management Area is a 2,556-acre (1,034 ha) Idaho wildlife management area in Madison County near the town of Roberts. Land in the WMA was acquired in 1997 and 1999 for partial mitigation of the effects of the construction of the Palisades Dam.

Most of the region's waterfowl species can be found in the WMA, including trumpeter swans. The WMA is open to non-motorized travel all year and hunting in fall.
