= Georgetown Summit Wildlife Management Area =

Protected area in Idaho, United States

- IUCN category IV (habitat/species management area)
- Location within Idaho
- Location: Bear Lake County, Idaho, United States
- Nearest city: Soda Springs, ID
- Coordinates: 42.556207°N 111.416566°W
- Area: 3,349 acres (13.6 km^{2})
- Established: 1991
- Governing body: Idaho Department of Fish and Game

Georgetown Summit Wildlife Management Area at 3,349 acres (13.55 km^{2}) is an Idaho wildlife management areain Bear Lake County near the town of Georgetown. Land for the WMA was first acquired in 1991 from the Rocky Mountain Elk Foundation near Caribou National Forest.

The WMA's location on Bear River is a major migratory for waterfowl north of Bear Lake and the Great Salt Lake. The WMA also provides year-round habitat for elk, mule deer, and other wildlife.
