= Market Lake Wildlife Management Area =

Protected area in Idaho, United States

- IUCN category IV (habitat/species management area)
- Location within Idaho
- Location: Jefferson County, Idaho, United States
- Nearest city: Roberts, ID
- Coordinates: 43°46′47″N 112°08′47″W
- Area: 5,071 acres (20.5 km^{2})
- Established: 1956
- Governing body: Idaho Department of Fish and Game
- Website: fishandgame.idaho.gov/ifwis/ibt/site.aspx?id=SE42

Market Lake Wildlife Management Area at 5,071 acres (20.52 km^{2}) is an Idaho wildlife management area in Jefferson County north of the town of Roberts. The WMA was established in 1956 to restore a portion of Market Lake for migrating and breeding waterfowl.

Water in the WMA comes from natural springs and artesian wells beneath the igneous rock. Mammals seen in the WMA include mule and white-tailed deer and small numbers of moose.

The former namesake lake, Market Lake, once was such a favorite hunting ground of wildlife, that the hunters referred to it as their "market", hence the name. The lake was later drained and the lake bed converted into agricultural land.
