= Shoshone (Snake River sternwheeler) =

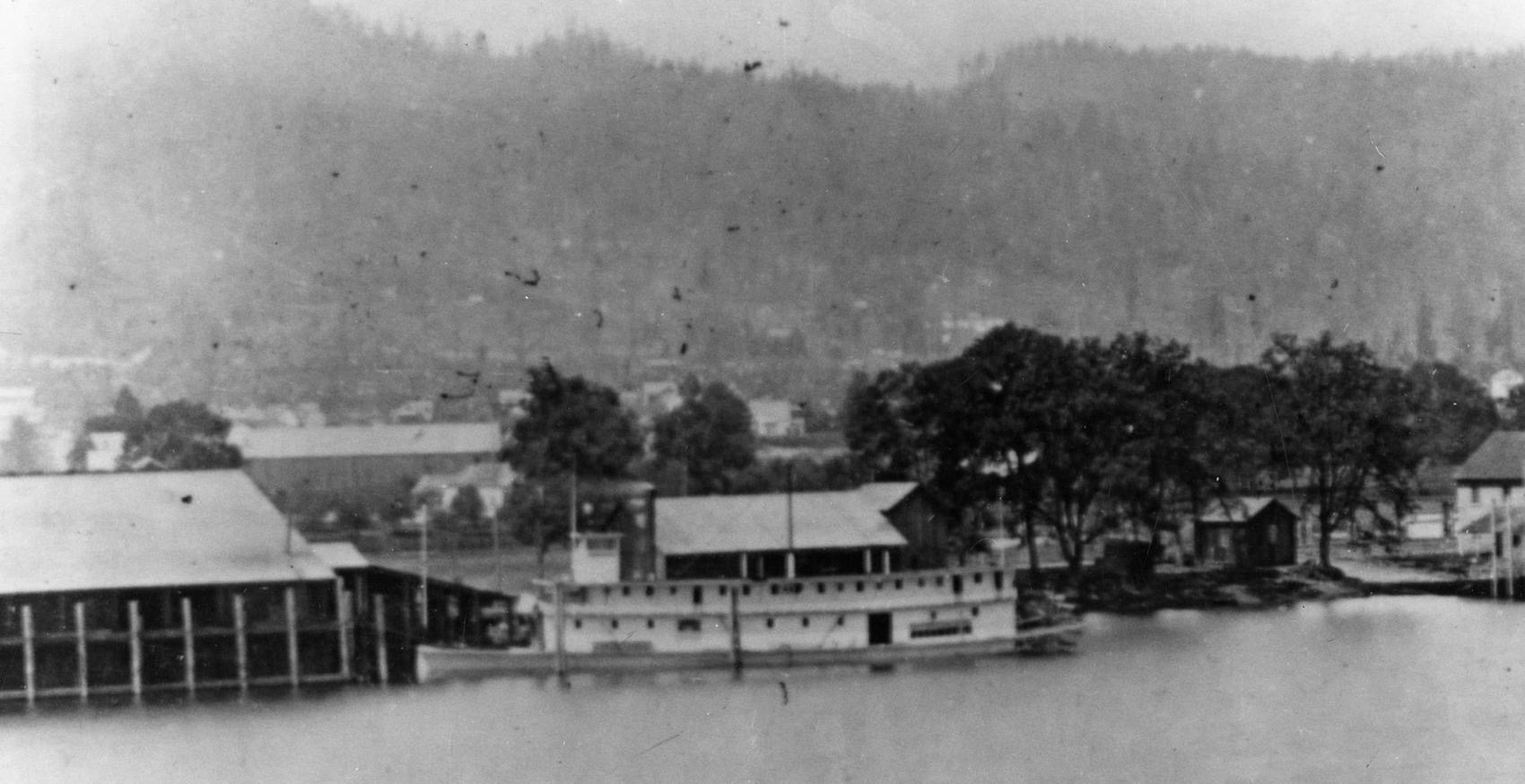
- Shoshone, on the Willamette River, at Portland, Oregon, circa 1872

History
- Name: Shoshone
- Owner: Oregon Steam Navigation Company
- Route: upper Snake River, Willamette River
- In service: 1866 (out of service for some time following construction)
- Out of service: November 1874
- Identification: US 23961
- Fate: Wrecked on Willamette River near Salem, Oregon
- Notes: First of only two steamboats to travel down Hells Canyon

General characteristics
- Type: shallow draft inland passenger-freighter
- Tonnage: 300 gross
- Length: 136 ft (41 m)
- Beam: 27 ft (8 m)
- Depth: 4.5 ft (1 m) depth of hold
- Installed power: steam, twin high pressure horizontally mounted, single-cylinder engines, 16" bore by 48" stroke, 16 hp (12 kW) nominal
- Propulsion: sternwheel

The Shoshone was the first steamboat built on the Snake River, Idaho, above Hells Canyon and the first of only two steamboats to be brought down through Hells Canyon to the lower Snake River. This was considered one of the most astounding feats of steamboat navigation ever accomplished.

== Design and construction ==
In the mid-1860s there was a mining boom in the area of Boise, Idaho. The Oregon Steam Navigation Company had tried to run a steamboat, the Colonel Wright, up the Snake River through Hells Canyon, but this proved impossible. As an alternative, O.S.N. decided to build a steamboat on the upper Snake River; this vessel, the Shoshone, was launched in 1866 at Old Fort Boise, Idaho.

All the iron and machinery had to be packed in by mule overland, and a forge was set up to hammer the iron into fittings. The timber for her hull and cabins was cut in the mountains and hauled or floated to the construction site, where it was sawn into planks and other components for the vessel. It cost the company as much to build Shoshone as it took to build three boats elsewhere. Although she was a large boat and expensive, Shoshone drew less than two feet of water and had no difficulty navigating the river to Old's Ferry, Idaho.

== Operations on upper Snake River ==
For a short time, under Captain Josiah Myrick, Shoshone carried miners and their equipment from Olds Ferry to the mining areas around Boise. The mining traffic then took a different route, and there was no business for the Shoshone. She was laid up for three years, with only two watchmen keeping an eye on her. This was frustrating for O.S.N. which had enjoyed spectacular success with almost all of its boats, often earning more on a single trip than it had cost (generally not long before) to build the steamboat in the first place.

== Run through Hells Canyon ==
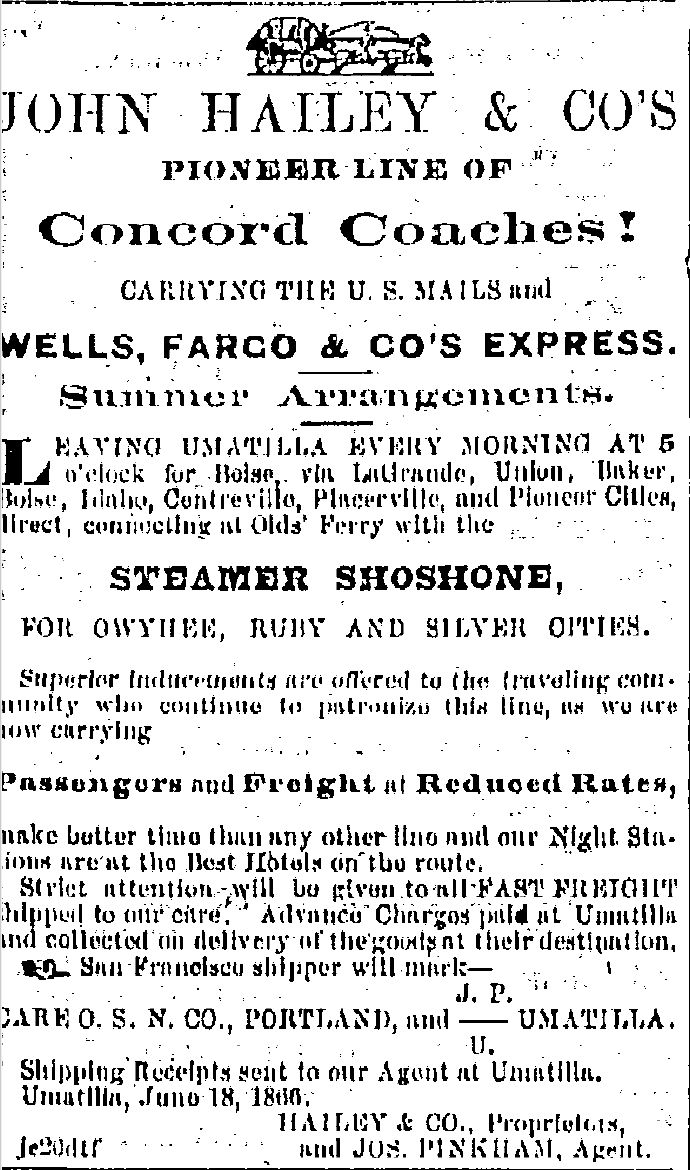
Advertisement for steamer Shoshone and connecting stage coach lines.

=== First attempt fails ===
John C. Ainsworth, president of O.S.N., gave orders to bring her down to the lower Snake River, but this proved difficult. On the first attempt, Shoshone's captain, Cy Smith, took her down Kerr and Cattle Rapids, but abandoned the effort at Lime Point (near Huntington, Oregon), saying with good reason that the whitewater ahead, Copper Ledge Falls, could not be run. Shoshone was laid up at Huntington, Oregon for another year.

=== Top men sent out for second run ===
In March 1870, Ainsworth assigned two of his best men, Capt. Sebastian "Bas" Miller and Chief Engineer Daniel E. "Buck" Buchanan, to bring her through the canyon or wreck in the attempt. Just reaching the Shoshone was a substantial journey in itself, as there were no railroads or highways of any kind. Miller and Buchanan took a steamboat up to Umatilla, Oregon, where they arrived in March 1870. This was the easy part, for after that they journeyed by buckboard into the Blue Mountains. When the roads ended, they traveled by sled over the snow; then, once the snow ended, by horseback, on foot, and finally by canoe.

=== Preparations for the run ===
Miller and Buchanan finally reached Shoshone in mid-April 1870, where they signed up one watchman, Livingston, as mate, and the other, Smith, as fireman. Another fellow who was around, W. F. Hedges, also signed on, and these five men became her crew. (Hedges later became a pilot on Puget Sound.) While Miller scouted out the river as best he could, Buchanan then overhauled the engines, tried to remedy the leaky seams in the Shoshone's planks, which made of mountain pine, had dried out, shrunk, and opened up narrow but long gaps between the planks in her hull. (This required water to be pumped over the hull until the planks swelled up.) In those days before electric lighting, Buchanan checked for leaks by leaving lighted candles in the hold of the boat, a risky proposition in a wooden boat that was, as one writer has said, nothing more than a "well-organized pile of kindling." If the boat were to be lost, it would likely be on account of the rapids rather than by fire, so to Buchanan the risk must have appeared reasonable.

=== Down the canyon ===
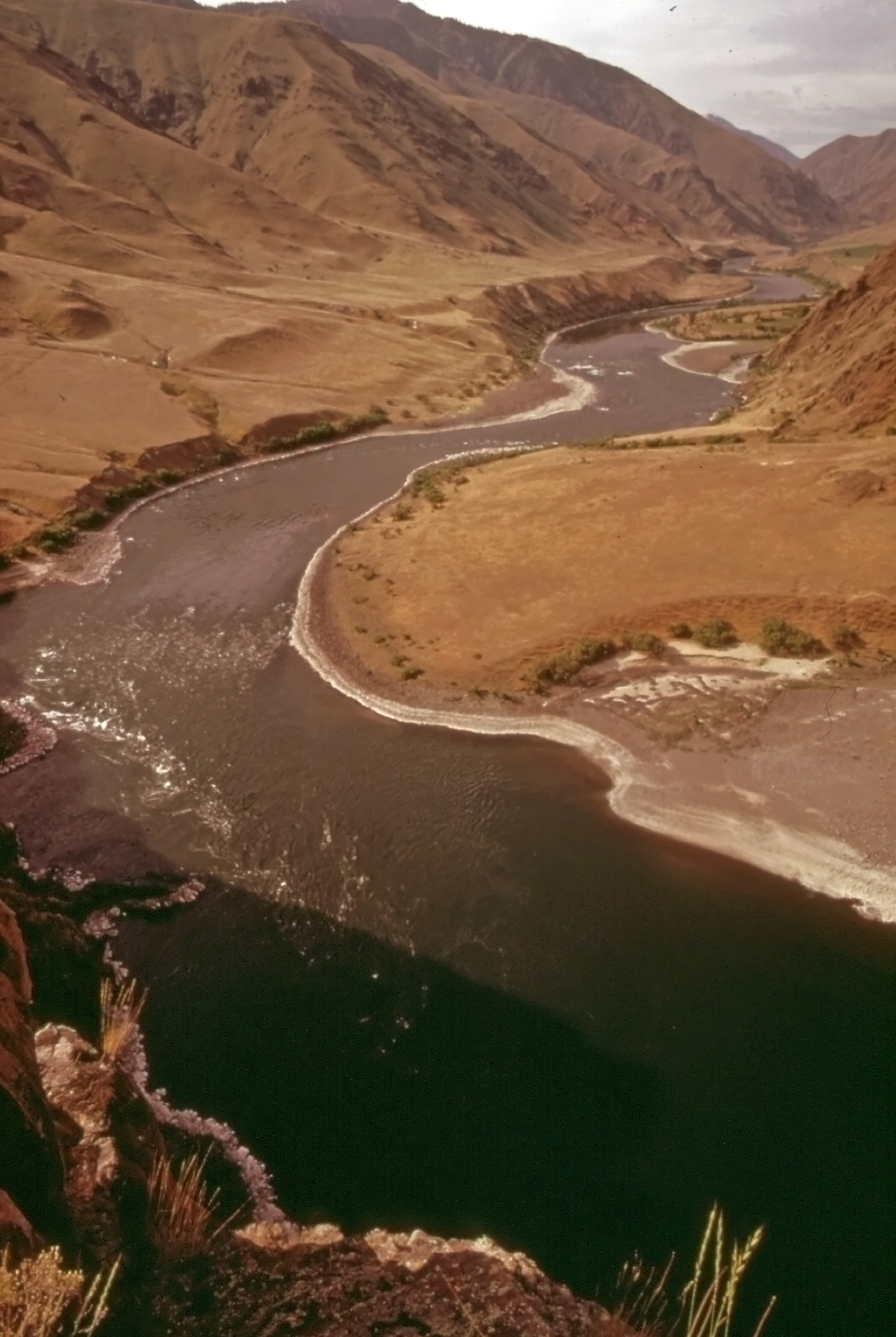
Hells Canyon, 1973

The river rose in mid-April, and by April 19, 1870, judging that the river was high enough to make the run, Captain Miller ordered lines cast off. His plan was to drift down with the current, then run the engines in reverse to gain steering control in the rapids. Going over Copper Ledge Falls, just a few hundred yards downstream, the boat first spun around three times in a powerful eddy just above the drop. Then the bow went over and the whole boat tilted sharply downwards until the sternwheel was spinning around free in the air. Once the boat hit the bottom of the drop, the sternwheel started to break up, throwing the boat out of control and into some rocks which crushed part of her bow. The boat was twisting and wracking and then a boiler valve broke, filling the engine room with steam. Captain Miller put ashore after this, and the crew repaired the vessel. Fortunately the smashed portion of the bow turned out to be above the waterline, and by 9:00 a.m. the next day they were ready to proceed.

They continued down river, hitting more rapids and cutting wood from trees along the bank for fuel. Captain Miller sent two men ahead in a boat to scout out for rocks and rapids, and the Shoshone proceeded behind them. They ran a particularly hazardous stretch at the Mountain Sheep section in Seven Devils Canyon. The boat was sucked into a whirlpool, and a huge wall of water came aboard, breaking into and nearly flooding the engine room, washing big chunks of cordwood all about the engine room floor. As the men in the engine room dodged these hazards, the Shoshone ran through a passage so narrow that there were only a few inches clearance between the rock walls on both sides of the vessel.

By April 23, a strong wind had come up, and the high wheel house of Shoshone acted like a sail, blowing her from one side of the river to the other. At this time, Shoshone and her crew had reached the deepest part of the canyon, thousands of feet below the canyon rim. In preparation for running this section, they stopped to make further repairs to the sternwheel and gather more wood for fuel. While they were cutting trees, a log rolled over Captain Miller and he was knocked unconscious until the next day. Once he came to, the boat went on, although Captain Miller had been severely injured. They journeyed further downriver until they passed the mouth of the Salmon River on April 26. From then on the running was fairly easy, first to the mouth of the Grande Ronde River, where they halted alongshore. The next day, April 27, the easy running ended when at 7:00 a.m. the boat reached the Wild Goose Rapids, which had a reputation as a fierce stretch of whitewater. Captain Miller took Shoshone through them without incident, and arrived at Lewiston, Idaho two hours later. As they neared the landing, Captain Miller hollered down the speaking tube to Engineer Buchanan:

Say, Buck, I expect that if this company wanted a couple of men to take a steamboat through hell, they would send for you and me.

Folks at Lewiston were astonished to see Miller, Buchanan, and Shoshone because the boat's jackstaff and flag had broken off in the first rapids, then floated downriver, where it was recovered and seemed firm evidence that Shoshone had been wrecked and her men were dead.

== Later years and final wreck ==
Shoshone was then taken further downriver, making the run over Celilo Falls, itself always reckoned a hazardous stretch, on June 28, 1870. Once below Celilo, she ran as a cattle boat between the upper Cascades and The Dalles. Later she was taken over the Cascades and down to the Willamette River, where she was sold to the Willamette River Transportation Company. The W.R.T. Co. then hauled Shoshone up around Willamette Falls, and ran her on the upper Willamette and also on the Yamhill River. There, perhaps surprisingly for a boat that had run Hells Canyon, she struck a rock near Salem, Oregon in the fall of 1874 and sank. Efforts to raise her failed, although her machinery was salvaged, and later installed in Champion. In January 1875, rising water lifted her free, and washed her down river to Lincoln. There a farmer salvaged her cabins, hauled them ashore, and turned them into a chicken coops.

== Legacy ==
Only one other steamboat ever ran the Hell's Canyon, Norma in 1895, under Captain William P. Gray. Gray of course knew of Miller and Buchanan's run, studied it, and decided to take Norma down during higher water. He also built an extra bulkhead into the bow and filled the hold with lumber.
