= Fort Boise Wildlife Management Area =

Protected area in Idaho, United States

- IUCN category IV (habitat/species management area)
- Location within Idaho
- Location: Canyon County, Idaho, United States
- Nearest city: Parma, ID
- Coordinates: 43.817939°N 117.009865°W
- Area: 1,630 acres (6.6 km^{2})
- Established: 1956
- Governing body: Idaho Department of Fish and Game
- Website: fishandgame.idaho.gov/ifwis/ibt/site.aspx?id=53

Fort Boise Lake Wildlife Management Area at 1,630 acres (6.6 km^{2}) is an Idaho wildlife management area in Canyon County near Parma. It was established in 1956 when 330 acres (130 ha) were deeded to the Idaho Department of Fish and Game by Idaho Power Company.

The WMA's wetlands are within the Boise and Snake rivers' floodplains and were originally used to replace goose nesting islands on the Snake River flooded by the Brownlee Dam. The shallow water and thick vegetation attract waterfowl and wildlife watchers and hunters.
