= Lucky Peak State Park =

State park in Idaho, United States

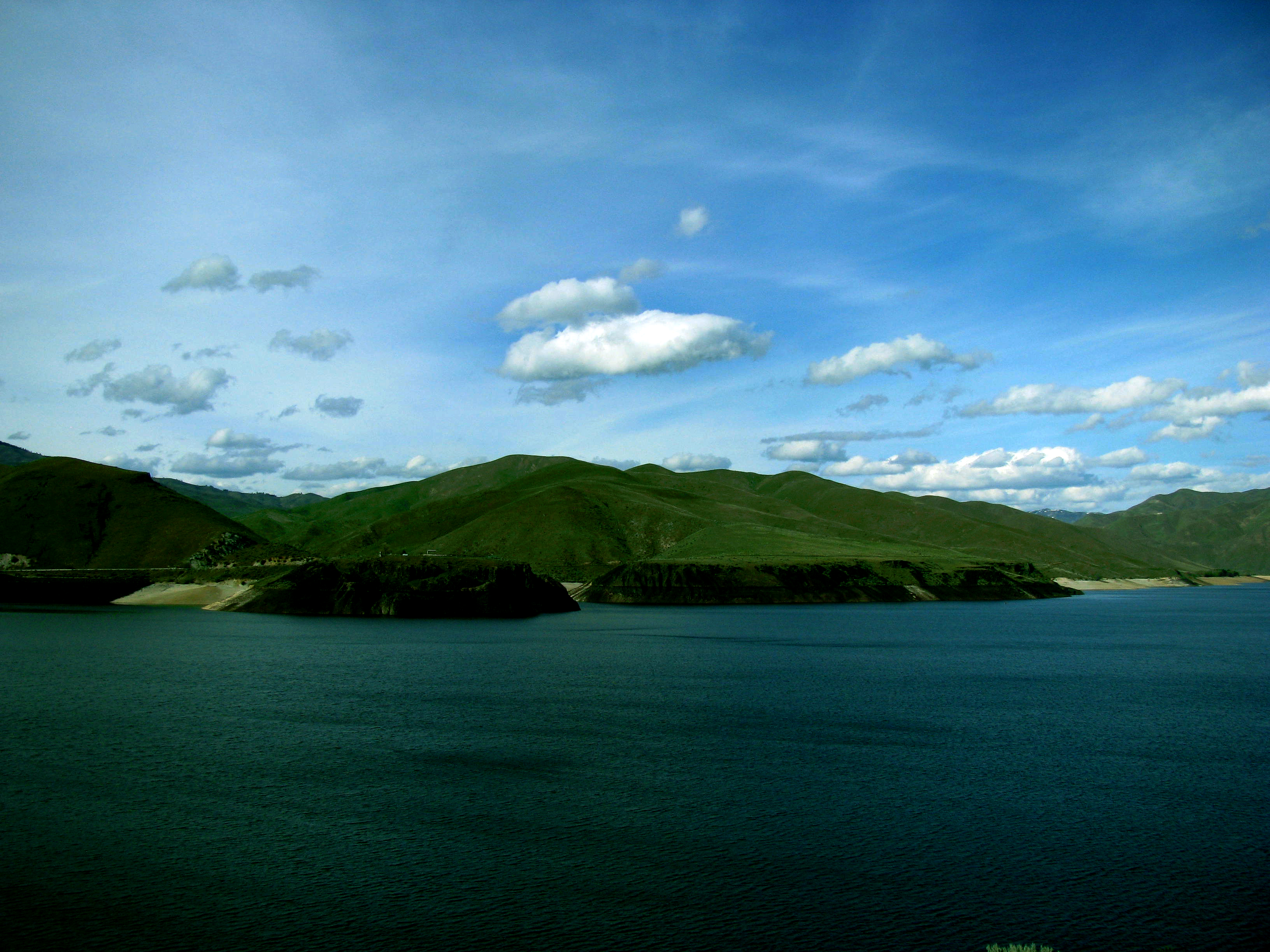
- Lucky Peak Lake

- Location within Idaho Location within the United States
- Location: Ada County, Idaho, United States
- Nearest city: Boise, Idaho
- Coordinates: 43°31′36″N 116°03′49″W
- Area: 240 acres (97 ha)
- Elevation: 2,828 ft (862 m)
- Established: 1956
- Administrator: Idaho Department of Parks and Recreation
- Website: Official website

Lucky Peak State Park is a public recreation area covering a total of 240 acres (97 ha) on and near Lucky Peak Lake, eight miles (13 km) southeast of Boise in Ada County, Idaho. The state park has three units: Discovery Park off State Highway 21, a roadside park for picnicking and fishing in the Boise River; Sandy Point at the base of the Lucky Peak Dam, with sandy beach and calm waters for wading and swimming; and the Spring Shores unit with boat ramps and marina at the northern end of the lake. The park was created in 1956 by agreement with the United States Army Corps of Engineers, following completion of the Lucky Peak Dam. The park is also home to the Lucky Peak Dam Zeolite Occurrence. The park can be accessed off of the Boise River Greenbelt.

== See also ==
- List of Idaho state parks
- National Parks in Idaho
