= Portneuf Wildlife Management Area =

Protected area in Idaho, United States

- IUCN category IV (habitat/species management area)
- Location within Idaho
- Location: Bannock County, Idaho, United States
- Nearest city: McCammon, ID
- Coordinates: 42°42′12″N 112°12′05″W
- Area: 3,104 acres (12.6 km^{2})
- Established: 1970
- Governing body: Idaho Department of Fish and Game
- Website: fishandgame.idaho.gov/ifwis/ibt/site.aspx?id=SE16

Portneuf Wildlife Management Area at 3,104 acres (12.56 km^{2}) is an Idaho Wildlife Management Area (WMA) in Bannock County near the town of McCammon. The first land acquisition for the WMA occurred in 1970 from M.S. Bastian, a local farmer and rancher. Three additional parcels were acquired in 1974.

== Background ==
The western slopes of the Portneuf Mountain Range have long provided winter habitat for mule deer. In 1970, the Idaho Department of Fish and Game used Pittman-Robertson funds to purchase over 2,800 acres of this winter range, creating Portneuf Wildlife Management Area (WMA). Later land acquisitions enlarged the WMA to over 3,100 acres. The maintenance and improvement of big game habitats is the primary objective at Portneuf WMA; upland game bird habitat enhancement is also a priority. Management activities conducted on Portneuf WMA benefit a variety of wildlife species found in the area.

== Management practices ==
Portneuf WMA is managed primarily as big game winter range. While only 75 mule deer inhabit the WMA throughout the year, that number swells to 500 during the winter months. A few moose and a small herd of elk also winter on the WMA. Shrub seedlings, such as bitterbrush and Hobble Creek sagebrush are planted on the WMA for big game forage. Managers maintain the grassland ranges for big game and upland game birds through weed control and periodically burning selected areas. Beavers were released in the area years ago and now inhabit some of the drainages on WMA lands. Their dam-building activities expand riparian areas, benefitting a host of other wildlife. The ponds created by beaver dams hold water in the area longer and greatly improve habitat for native cutthroat trout populations.

== Wildlife ==
While mule deer, elk, and moose are the only large mammals inhabiting Portneuf WMA, a number of small mammals also call the area home. Beavers reside in some creek drainages, along with porcupines and mink. Coyotes, raccoons, yellow-bellied marmots, cottontail rabbits, red pine squirrels, and the occasional bobcat and mountain lion also roam WMA lands. Golden eagles, Northern harriers, red-tailed hawks, and great horned owls are commonly seen on Portneuf WMA. Swainson’s and rough-legged hawks are early spring visitors, passing through on their migration flights north. Blue, ruffed, and Columbia sharptailed grouse are commonly found on the WMA. Turkey, gray partridge, and ring-necked pheasants are less common resident upland bird species. Yellow warbler, yellow-rumped warbler, MacGillivray’s warbler, vesper sparrow, song sparrow, savannah sparrow, American goldfinch, lazuli bunting, western kingbird, western wood pewee, black-capped chickadee, sage thrasher, rufous-sided towhee, green-tailed towhee, American robin, ruby-crowned kinglet, western meadowlark, and pine siskin are some of the birds that inhabit Portneuf WMA’s riparian and upland habitat.

== Location and directions ==
Portneuf WMA is located 16 miles southeast of Pocatello in eastern Idaho’s Bannock County. To reach Portneuf WMA, take Interstate 15 to exit 57 (Inkom). Turn south on U.S. Highway 91. Three secondary roads lead the visitor to the WMA from the highway. To access the northern portion of the WMA, remain on U.S. Highway 91 for 4 1/2 miles. Turn east on Lower Rock Creek Road and travel 2 miles. Turn south on Bonneville Road and travel 1 1/2 miles to the parking area at the WMA's north boundary. To access the central portion of the WMA, remain on U.S. Highway 91 for an additional 2 1/4 miles to the Crane Creek parking area located on the east side of the highway. Robber’s Roost Creek Road and parking area are one mile further south on the east side of U.S. Highway 91. The southern portion of the WMA is accessible from a road 3/4 mile south of Robber’s Roost Creek that turns east from U.S. Highway 91 along the WMA's south boundary.

== Setting ==
Portneuf WMA lies west of Haystack Mountain on the western slope of the Portneuf Mountain Range. Despite its relatively small size, the WMA encompasses a number of different habitats. Riparian habitat along the Portneuf River and the WMA drainages is defined by willow, red osier dogwood, birch, and cottonwood. Upland areas contain a mixture of shrubs and grasses including sagebrush, bitterbrush, serviceberry, elderberry, mountain mahogany, chokecherry, juniper, bluebunch wheatgrass, Idaho fescue, and bottle-brush squirreltail. On the timbered slopes adjoining the Caribou-Targhee National Forest, Douglas fir, juniper, and aspen stands dominate.

Elevations range from 4,700 feet along the Portneuf River to 7,500 feet on the WMA’s timbered ridges. The west-facing slope of the WMA is traversed by four creeks and several smaller drainages. Annual precipitation ranges from ten to fourteen inches, half of which falls during the growing season. Summers are hot and dry, with temperatures reaching as high as 103 °F. Winters are cold and dry; severe storms can cause the mercury to plunge to -30 °F. While snow can accumulate to a depth of 36 inches on the high slopes of the WMA, lowland areas rarely receive such accumulations. The lack of snow in these areas allows forage to remain exposed or just below the snow surface. Available forage attracts deer and elk to the area during winter months.

Benchtop areas were dry-farmed in the past, but are now being reclaimed by mountain shrubs.

== History ==
Robber's Roost Canyon is an important habitat feature of the WMA, providing an important riparian corridor and Yellowstone cutthroat trout spawning areas, but it is probably better known as a historic bandit hideout. During the 1860s, a stagecoach route passed through Portneuf Canyon linking Salt Lake City, Utah and Virginia City, Montana. The stage often carried gold from Montana mines to Salt Lake City banks. The narrow canyon and thick brush provided the perfect setting for stage robberies and bandits flocked to the area to ambush gold-laden stages. The site’s popularity with men on the wrong side of the law eventually earned it the name “Robber’s Roost”.

A now legendary stage holdup occurred in 1865. The Pocatello Tribune provided this account of the heist: “a stage of the Concord type, carrying several passengers and $60,000 worth of gold was betrayed by its driver, Frank Williams, to a gang led by Jim Locket. As he rounded a steep hill, Williams turned his horses, and the road agents, concealed in the brush which was so thick that it scratched the sides of the coach, gave the word of halt. Among the passengers were two wealthy businessmen from St. Louis. Apprehensive of being held up, they armed themselves for the journey. At the cry ‘hands up!’, the passengers opened fire bringing upon themselves a volley that killed both of them and two other men.” Legend has it that the outlaws buried their loot in the Robber’s Roost area. As years passed, one story then another told of a captured outlaw who confessed to his part in the holdup. The lure of stolen gold attracted many people to the area. When homesteaders settled the area, they spoke of watching strangers armed with shovels, tape measures, and crude maps scour the hillsides of Robber’s Roost, but ultimately leaving empty-handed. To this day, many people believe that the stolen gold remains hidden somewhere in Robber’s Roost. Visitors are welcome to explore Robber's Roost Canyon, but digging and resource damage is not permitted.
