= Boundary Creek Wildlife Management Area =

Protected area in Idaho, United States

- IUCN category IV (habitat/species management area)
- Location within Idaho
- Location: Boundary County, Idaho, United States
- Nearest city: Bonners Ferry, ID
- Coordinates: 48.982655°N 116.548659°W
- Area: 1,405 acres (5.7 km^{2})
- Established: 1999
- Governing body: Idaho Department of Fish and Game
- Website: www.webcitation.org/6EaT3HzDR?url=http%3A%2F%2Ffishandgame.idaho.gov%2FIFWIS%2Fibt%2Fsite.aspx%3Fid%3DN2

Boundary Creek Wildlife Management Area at 1,405 acres (5.69 km^{2}) is an Idaho wildlife management area in Boundary County along the border with British Columbia, Canada. It was purchased in 1999 with Fish and Game license funds Bonneville Power Administration wildlife mitigation funds. The WMA is open from sunrise to sunset, and access is free.

It is located along the Kootenai River, which contains the white sturgeon, an endangered species. Wildlife found in the WMA included ruffed grouse, wild turkey, rough-legged hawk, great horned owl, and a variety of waterfowl and other wildlife.
