= List of Idaho wildlife management areas =

Idaho Wildlife Management Areas (1) Market Lake (2) Deer Parks (3) Cartier Slough

This is a list of Idaho wildlife management areas. The U.S. state of Idaho current has 32 wildlife management areas, all managed by the Idaho Department of Fish and Game. Wildlife management areas (WMA) are established to protect habitat for wildlife and provide opportunities for hunting, fishing, and other public enjoyment of wildlife. The species of interest for each WMA varies from big game, such as elk, moose, and mule and white-tailed deer, to upland game (such as ring-necked pheasant) and waterfowl, including a variety of ducks and Canada geese.

== List of WMAs ==
Wildlife Management Areas of Idaho
WMA name	Counties	Area	Year established	Location
Big Cottonwood	Cassia	814 acres (329 ha)	1993	42.304728°N 114.012629°W
Billingsley Creek	Gooding	284 acres (115 ha)	1963	42.835419°N 113.931455°W
Blackfoot River	Caribou	2,400 acres (970 ha)	1994	42.823114°N 111.338132°W
Boise River	Ada, Boise, Elmore	34,000 acres (14,000 ha)	1943	43.595227°N 116.048664°W
Boundary Creek	Boundary	1,405 acres (569 ha)	1999	48.982655°N 116.548659°W
Camas Prairie	Camas	3,100 acres (1,300 ha)	1987	43.289343°N 115.018402°W
Carey Lake	Blaine	400 acres (160 ha)	1949	43.323509°N 113.931455°W
Cartier Slough	Madison	961 acres (389 ha)	1976	43.815377°N 111.913122°W
Cecil D. Andrus	Washington	23,908 acres (9,675 ha)	1993	44.757589°N 116.888624°W
C.J. Strike	Elmore, Owyhee	10,664 acres (4,316 ha)	1953	42.958104°N 115.968016°W
Coeur d'Alene River	Benewah, Kootenai	5,799 acres (2,347 ha)	1964	47.482485°N 116.732146°W
Craig Mountain	Nez Perce	115,000 acres (47,000 ha)	1971	46.124601°N 116.917648°W
Deer Parks	Jefferson, Madison	2,556 acres (1,034 ha)	1997	43.762833°N 111.999545°W
Farragut	Kootenai	1,413 acres (572 ha)	1949	47.971846°N 116.541586°W
Fort Boise	Canyon	1,630 acres (660 ha)	1956	43.817939°N 117.009865°W
Georgetown Summit	Bear Lake	3,349 acres (1,355 ha)	1991	42.556207°N 111.416566°W
Hagerman	Gooding	880 acres (360 ha)	1940	42.769254°N 114.878624°W
Market Lake	Jefferson	5,071 acres (2,052 ha)	1956	43.779813°N 112.146471°W
McArthur Lake	Bonner, Boundary	1,207 acres (488 ha)	1942	48.5137°N 116.449741°W
Montour	Gem	1,100 acres (450 ha)	1976	43.93029°N 116.326396°W
Montpelier	Bear Lake	2,158 acres (873 ha)	1971	42.333519°N 111.252734°W
Mud Lake	Jefferson	8,853 acres (3,583 ha)	1940	43.891436°N 112.416718°W
Niagara Springs	Gooding	976 acres (395 ha)	1971	42.670987°N 114.71507°W
Payette River	Payette	1,200 acres (490 ha)	1960	44.005942°N 116.813867°W
Pend Oreille	Bonner	4,908 acres (1,986 ha)	1956	48.317819°N 116.393832°W
Portneuf	Bannock	3,104 acres (1,256 ha)	1970	42.703296°N 112.201352°W
Red River	Idaho	314 acres (127 ha)	1993	45.729043°N 115.430234°W
St. Maries	Benewah	3,819 acres (1,545 ha)	1941	47.262326°N 116.551481°W
Sand Creek	Fremont	31,000 acres (13,000 ha)	1947	44.037978°N 111.717301°W
Snow Peak	Shoshone	32,000 acres (13,000 ha)	1989	47.044357°N 115.648766°W
Sterling	Bingham	3,400 acres (1,400 ha)	1968	42.962573°N 112.765686°W
Tex Creek	Bonneville	310,000 acres (130,000 ha)	1976	43.467409°N 111.708942°W
