= Lucky Peak Lake =

Reservoir in Idaho, USA

Lucky Peak Reservoir
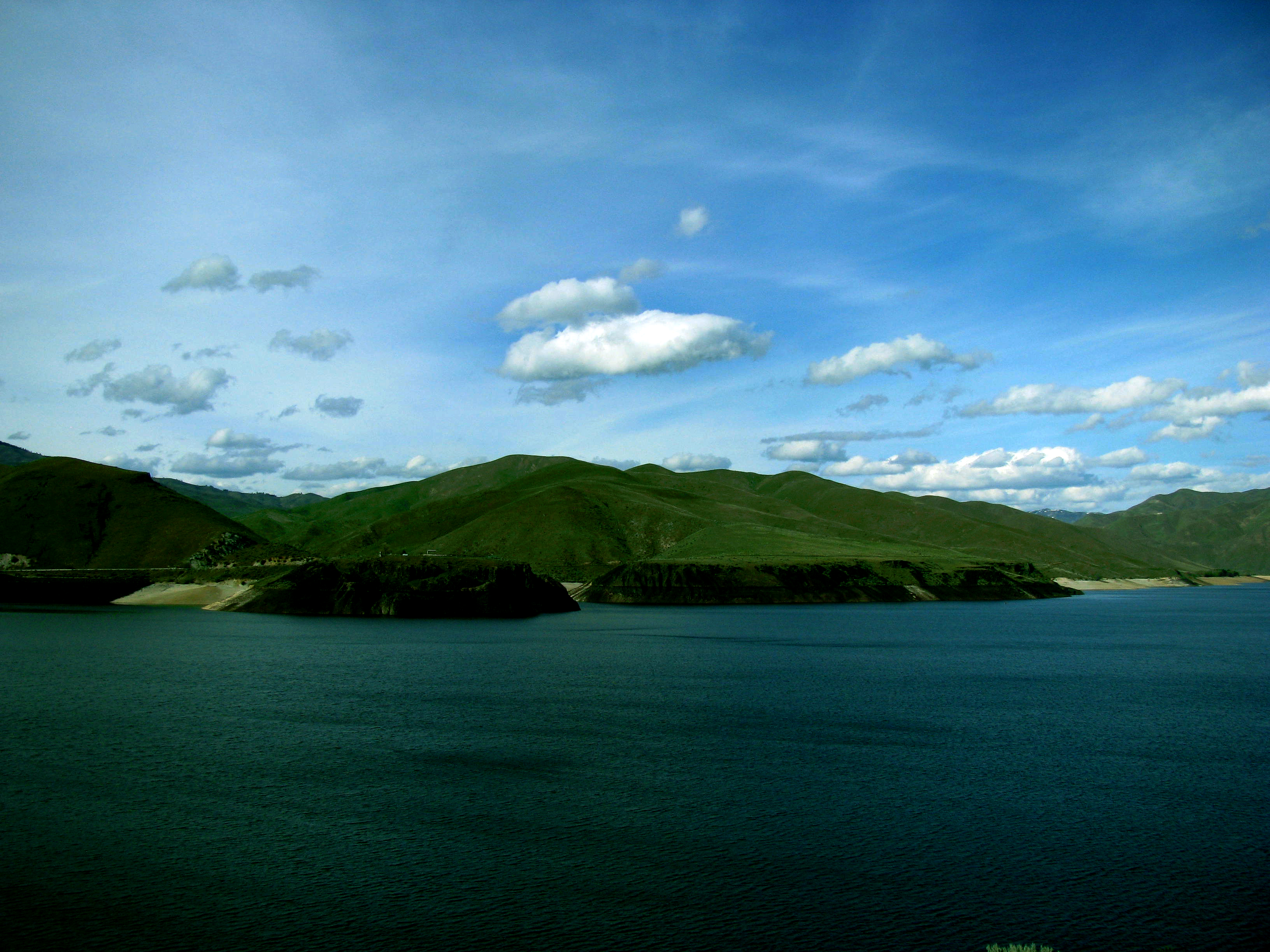
- Lucky Peak Reservoir in April 2010

- Location within Idaho Location within the United States
- Location: Ada / Boise / Elmore counties, Idaho, United States
- Coordinates: 43°31′31″N 116°2′36″W
- Type: reservoir
- Primary inflows: Boise River
- Primary outflows: Boise River
- Catchment area: 2,680 sq mi (6,940 km^{2})
- Basin countries: United States
- Built: 1955, Lucky Peak Dam
- Surface area: 2,820 acres (11.4 km^{2})
- Water volume: 307,000 acre⋅ft (0.379 km^{3})
- Surface elevation: 3,050 ft (930 m) AMSL

Lucky Peak Reservoir (also known as Lucky Peak Lake) is a reservoir on the Boise River in the U.S. state of Idaho. It is located mainly in Ada County, extending into Boise County and Elmore County. It was created in 1955 with the construction of Lucky Peak Dam. Lucky Peak State Park surrounds part of the lake.

== Gallery ==
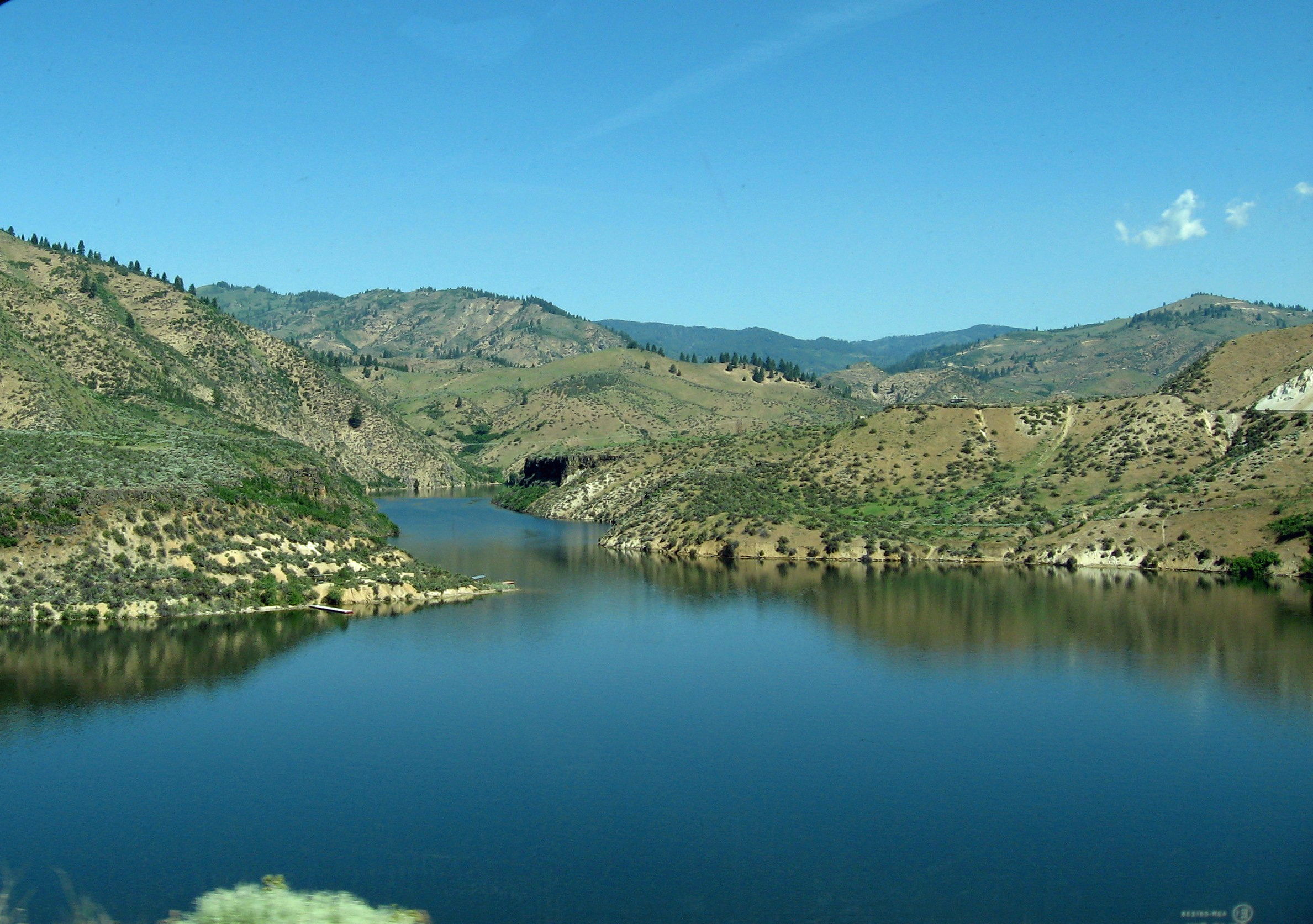
Lucky Peak Lake from Idaho highway 21

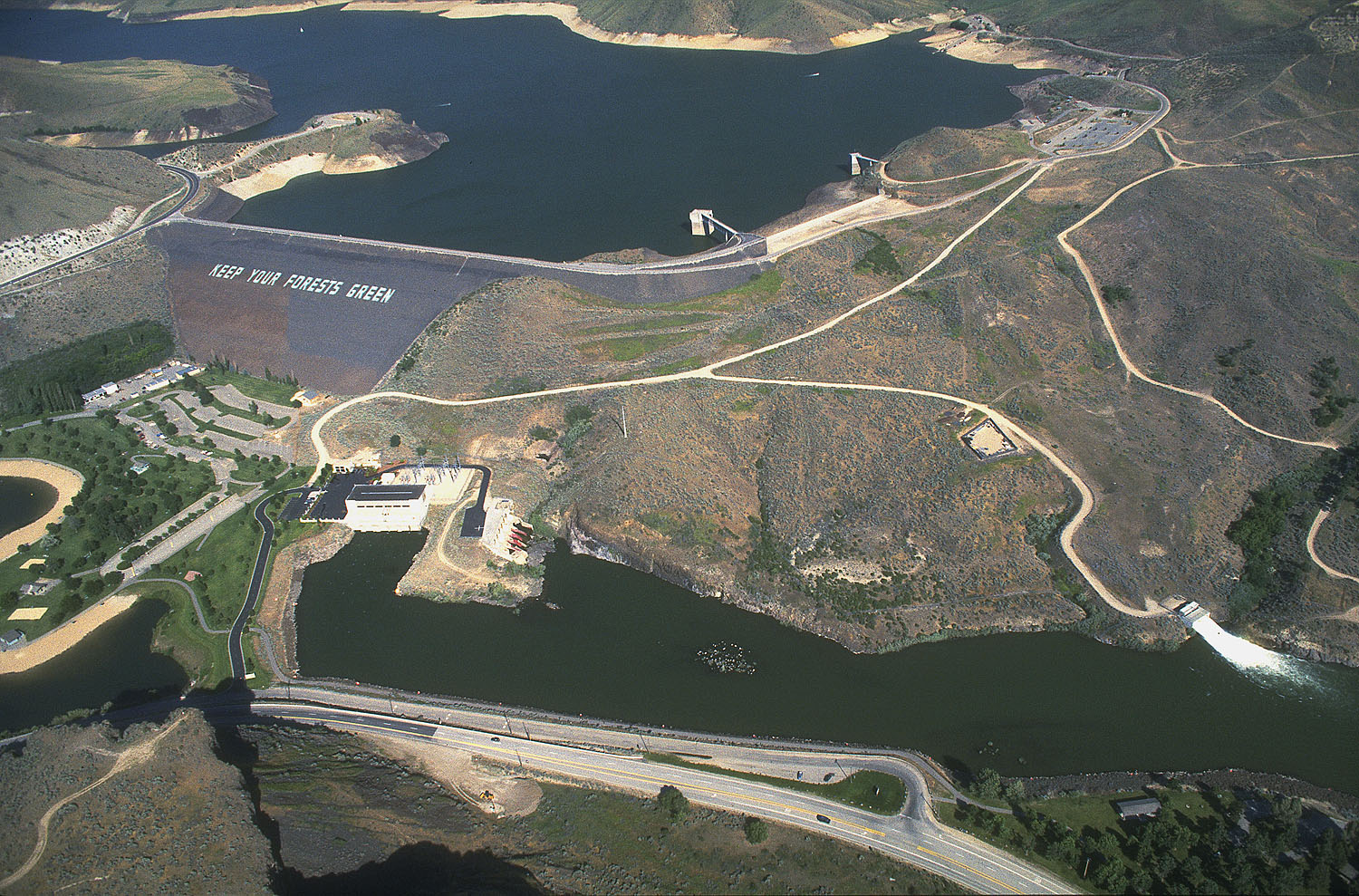
Lucky Peak Lake and Dam

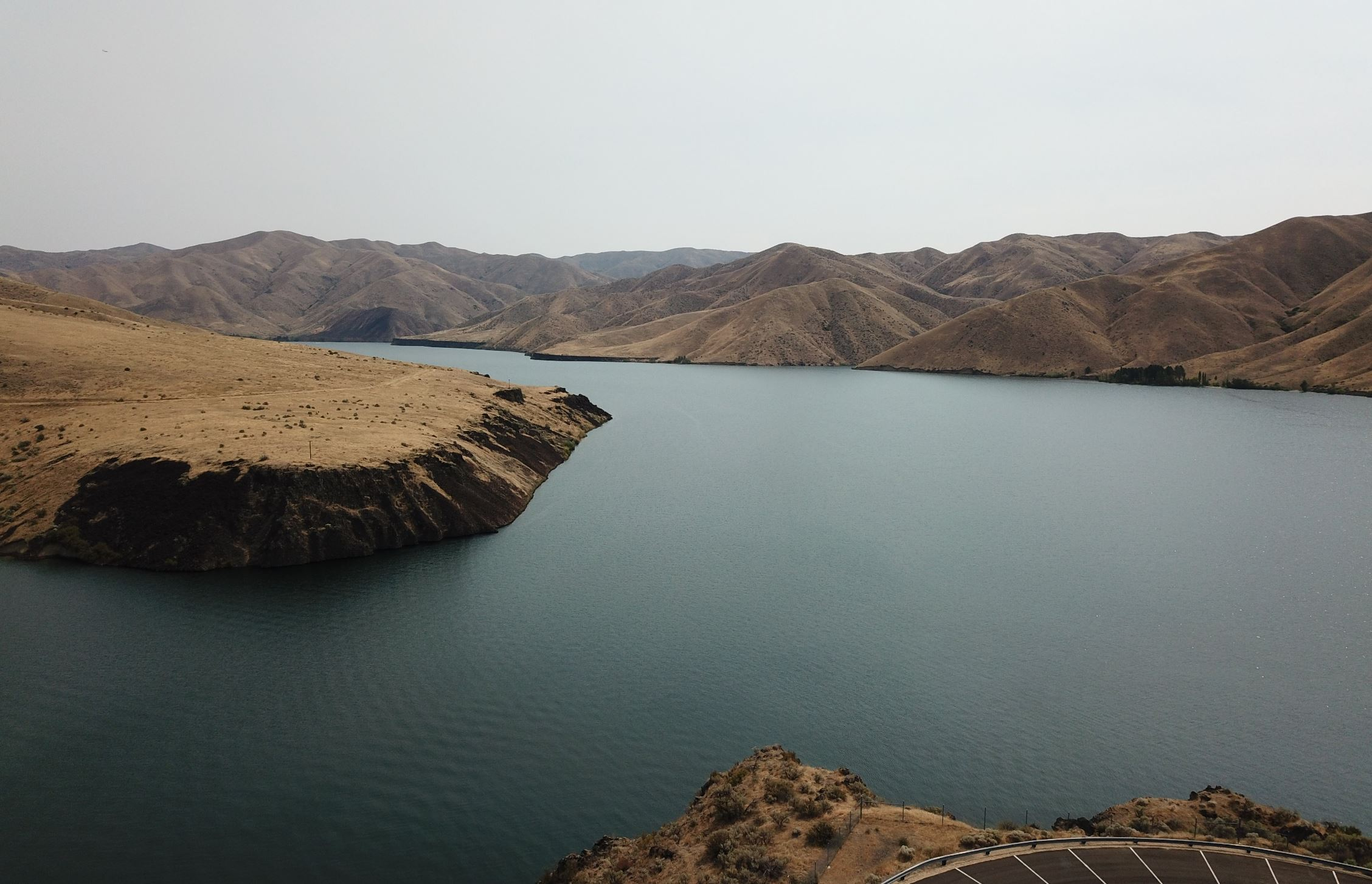
Lucky Peak Lake in December 2018

== See also ==
- List of lakes of Idaho
