= Boundary Creek (Madera County, California) =

Stream in Madera County, California, U.S.

Coordinates: 37°36′17″N 119°04′57″W

Boundary Creek is a stream in Madera County, California, in the United States.

Boundary Creek was likely named from its location in Madera County near the Mono County line.

== See also ==
- List of rivers of California
