= State Trust Lands =

Category of public land in the United States

State trust lands were granted by the United States Congress to states upon entering the Union. These lands were designated to support essential public institutions which are primarily public schools. State trust land managers lease and sell these lands to generate revenue for current and future designated beneficiaries. Predominantly found in the western United States, 46 million acres of land are currently designated as trust lands and the proceeds from the lease and sale of these lands are distributed into a state's permanent fund and used for many purposes.

== History ==
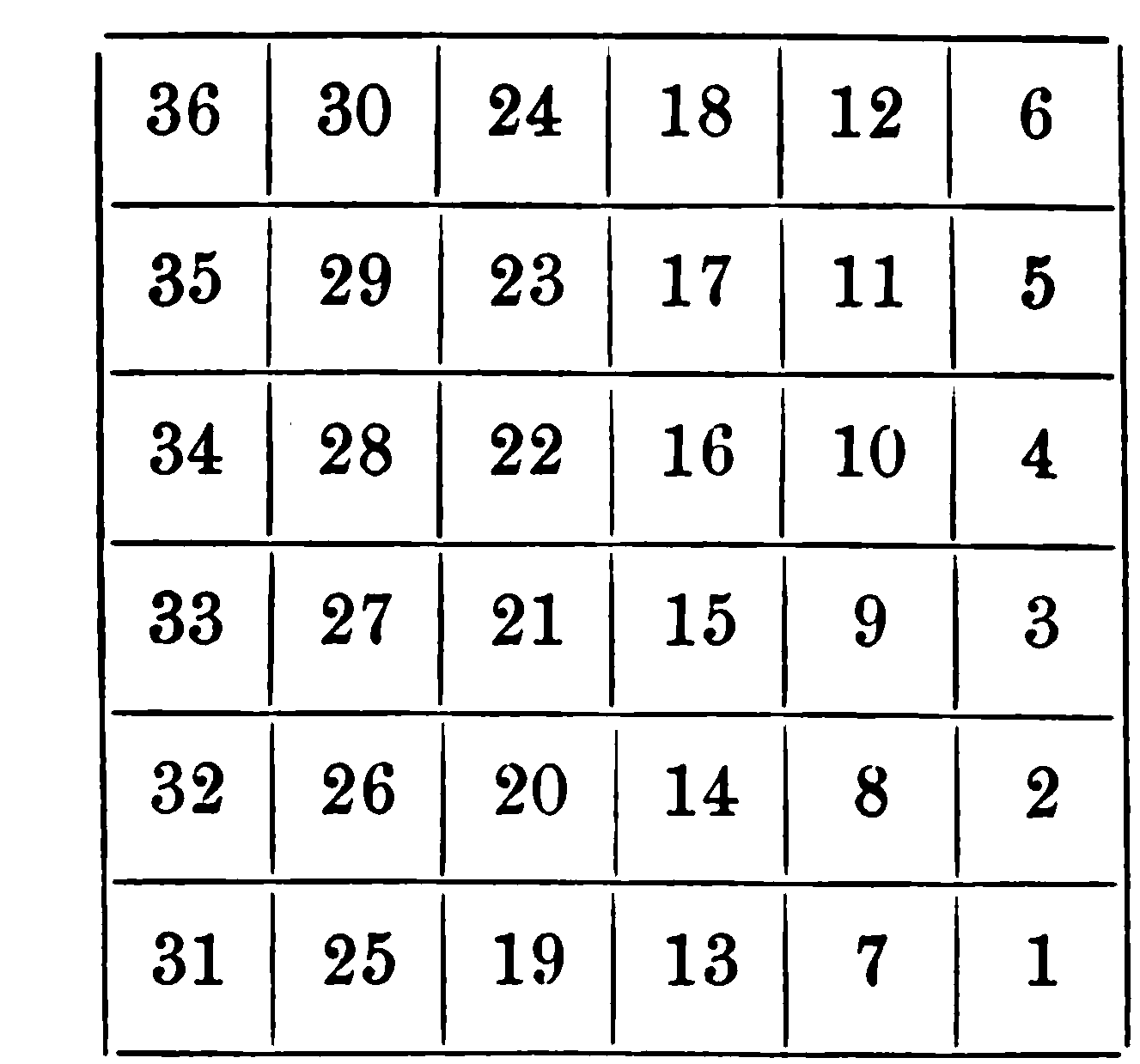
The survey system divided public land into 36 one-square mile sections. See General Land Ordinance of 1785.

The General Land Ordinance of 1785 and the Northwest Ordinance established and systematized the policies that governed the disposal of the public domain to settlers and the creation of new states. Under the framework of these ordinances, a centrally located parcel in each surveyed township – section sixteen – would be reserved for the support of schools, and once the territory became a state, the state would receive title to these reserved parcels (as well as land grants to support other public institutions). This policy was later expanded to include additional reserved sections to support schools, as well as land grants to support other public institutions, such as universities for mechanical and agricultural education (now called land-grant universities), hospitals, schools for the deaf and blind, and correctional facilities, among others. K-12 public schools were by far the largest beneficiaries of the land grant programs.

=== Survey system for division of land ===
The rectangular survey system established by the General Land Ordinance of 1785 and the Northwest Ordinance divided the public domain into 36-square mile areas of land, referred to as townships. Each township was further divided into 36 one-square mile sections. This basic system of government was strongly informed by the governance structure of the individual colonies, the revolutionary sentiments related to public education, enlightenment-era rationalism, and the concept of agrarian democracy. With populations oriented around small, agrarian communities, these townships would provide for the democratic education of their citizens.

The state land grant program descended from a common belief that liberty was founded on education, and as a result, the provision of universal public education was an essential requirement to ensure a democratic future for the expanding nation. Although the early federal government had little money available to support the public needs of the newly organizing states, thanks to the Louisiana Purchase, the federal government had one resource in abundance – land. By granting some of these lands to newly organized states, the federal government could provide new state governments (who lacked any substantial tax base) with a source of revenue that could be used to fund public education and other important public institutions.

== Beneficiaries ==
The beneficiaries of state trust land vary from state to state depending upon the purposes for which the lands were granted. In all states, the most significant beneficiary of trust lands is public K-12 education or common schools. However, in many states, lands are also held in trust for other beneficiaries, which usually include state universities, public hospitals, schools for the deaf and blind, public buildings, and correctional facilities.

The revenue distribution process varies from state to state. States predominantly generate revenue from leasing activities or sales of renewable resources (such as grazing leases and timber sales), uses that provide annual income for the beneficiaries. Additionally, revenues from the sale of trust lands or the sale of non-renewable natural resources are invested into a permanent fund to generate interest for distribution to the beneficiaries. These permanent funds, and the interest payments derived from them, are used for many purposes related to the public school system, including guaranteeing school bonds and loans, funding construction and providing land for public institutions, and supplementing teacher salaries. The generation of revenue varies state to state:

- Alaska: Timber, real estate/commercial real estate sales and leasing, mining, materials production, oil and gas leasing, and coal production
- Arkansas: Sand, gravel, timber, oil, gas, coal, and mineral leases
- Arizona: Land sales for commercial and residential development
- California: Geothermal royalties
- Colorado: Coal, oil, and gas revenues and royalties
- Hawaii: Fees, leases, and license sales
- Idaho: Timber sales, mineral leasing and royalties, grazing leases, recreation leases, cropland leases, communication site leases, and conservation leases
- Louisiana: Timber
- Minnesota: Mineral royalties and timber
- Mississippi: Land sales for commercial and residential development
- Montana: Oil and gas royalties
- Nebraska: rental and bonus for agricultural leases and rental, bonuses and royalties for mineral leases
- Nevada: Land sales
- New Mexico: Subsurface activities, especially oil and gas
- North Dakota: Grazing and agricultural leases
- Oklahoma: Leases
- Oregon: Timber
- South Dakota: Oil and gas leases
- Texas: Oil and gas leases, real estate trades and sales, and sustainable energy development
- Utah: Mining of oil and gas
- Washington: Timber
- Wisconsin: Renewable forest products, land sales to the government for county, state, and national forests
- Wyoming: Oil and gas royalties
