= Lucky Peak Dam =

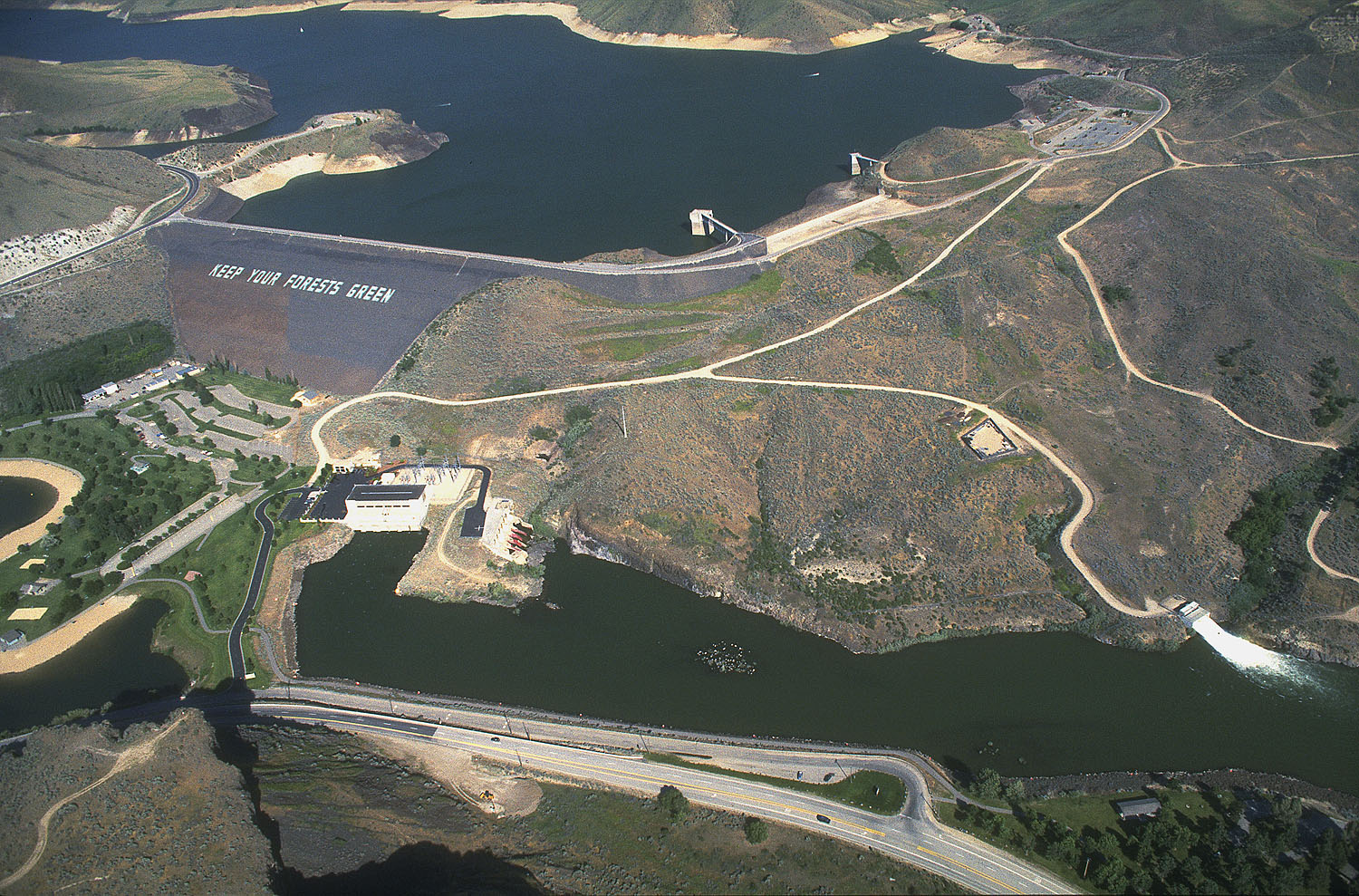
- Aerial view from the west in June 1997

- Location in the United States Location in Idaho
- Country: United States
- Location: Ada County, Idaho
- Coordinates: 43°31′42″N 116°3′11″W
- Purpose: Flood control, irrigation
- Construction began: 1949
- Opening date: 1955; 71 years ago
- Construction cost: $19 million (1955)
- Owner: U.S. Army; Corps of Engineers

Dam and spillways
- Type of dam: Embankment dam
- Impounds: Boise River
- Height: 340 ft (104 m)
- Length: 2,340 ft (713 m)

Reservoir
- Creates: Lucky Peak Reservoir
- Total capacity: 307,000 acre-feet (379,000,000 m^{3})
- Catchment area: 2,680 square miles (6,940 km^{2})
- Surface area: 2,820 acres (11.4 km^{2})
- Normal elevation: 3,050 ft (930 m)

Power Station
- Commission date: 1988; 38 years ago
- Turbines: 2 x 45 MW, 1 x 11 MW; Kaplan-type
- Installed capacity: 101 MW
- Annual generation: 321,790,000 KWh
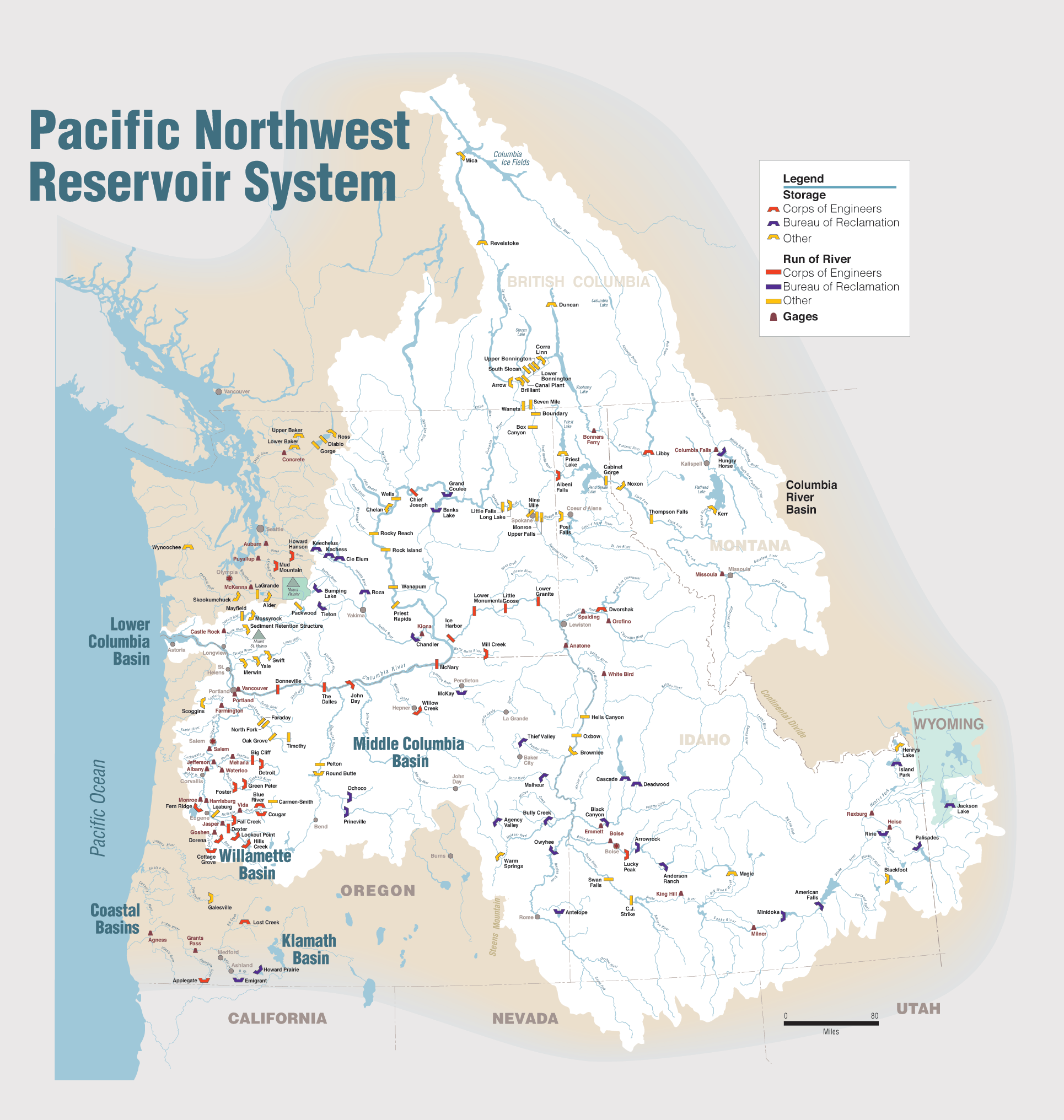
- Columbia River Basin

Lucky Peak Dam is a rolled earth and gravel fill embankment dam in the western United States, located on the Boise River in southwestern Idaho. In Ada County east of Boise, it is directly downstream of Arrowrock Dam, a concrete arch dam completed in 1915. At the time of its construction in the early 1950s, Lucky Peak's primary purpose was flood control, with a secondary purpose of irrigation. The normal operating elevation of the full reservoir is 3,055 feet (931 m) above sea level, the empty reservoir's elevation (Boise River) is 2,824 feet (861 m).

Construction began in November 1949 by the U.S. Army Corps of Engineers. Most of the federal dams in southern Idaho, including the others on the Boise River, were built by the Bureau of Reclamation, not the Corps of Engineers. The Idaho Power Company, a private utility, built multiple hydroelectric dams on the Snake River.

Located along State Highway 21, ten miles (16 km) upstream from the city of Boise, it was built without hydroelectric power generation. Construction of the powerhouse began in 1984 and it became operational in 1988, generating electricity primarily for Seattle City Light.

The dam was named after a nearby mountain in the Boise Range, about four miles (6 km) north of the dam (43.605°N 116.062°W). The summit elevation of Lucky Peak mountain (a.k.a. Shaw Mountain) is 5,904 feet (1,800 m).

The dam forms Lucky Peak Lake and is surrounded by Lucky Peak State Park.

The dam is also in close proximity to the Lucky Peak Dam Zeolite Occurrence.

== Gallery ==
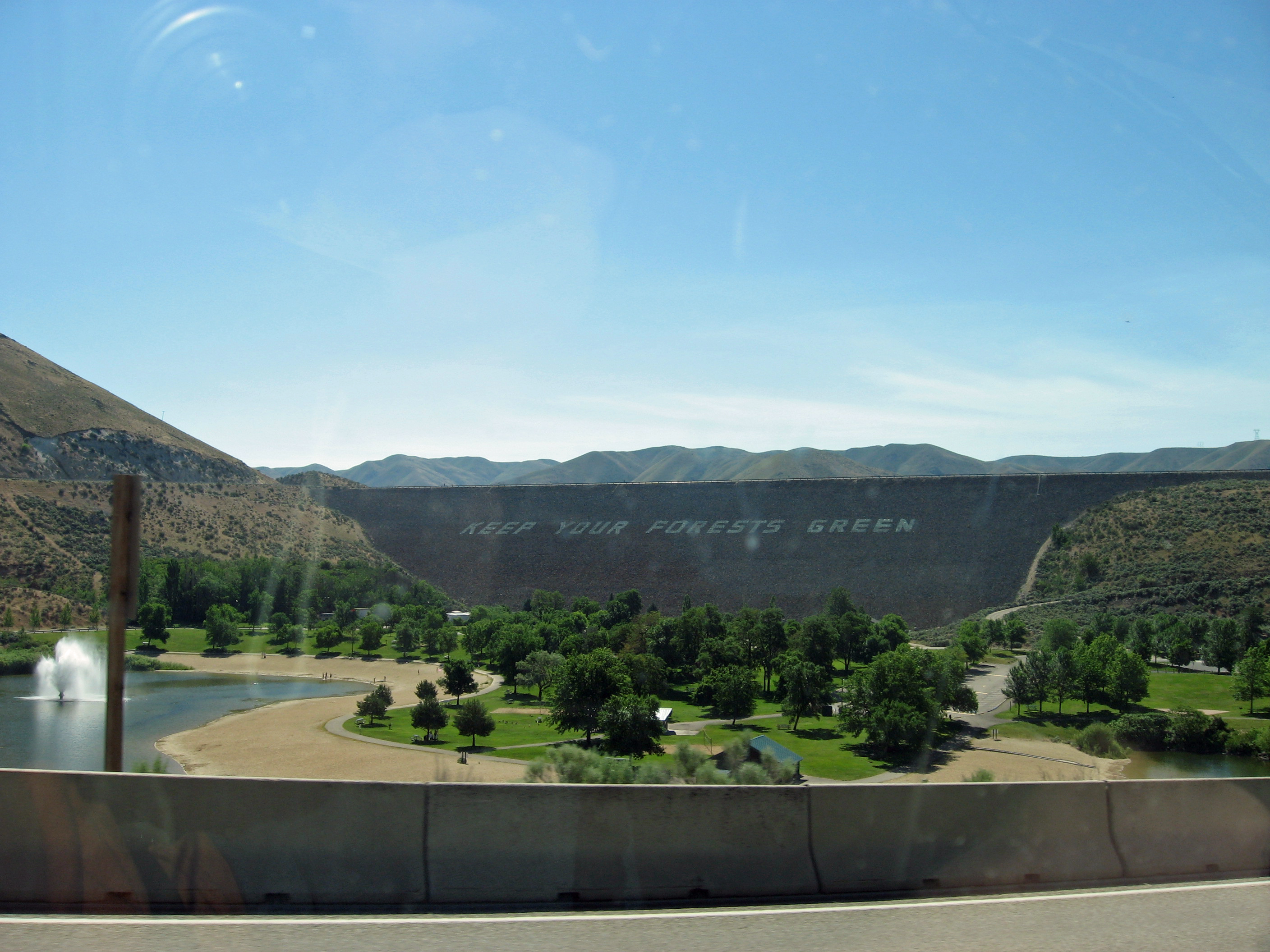
Lucky Peak Dam

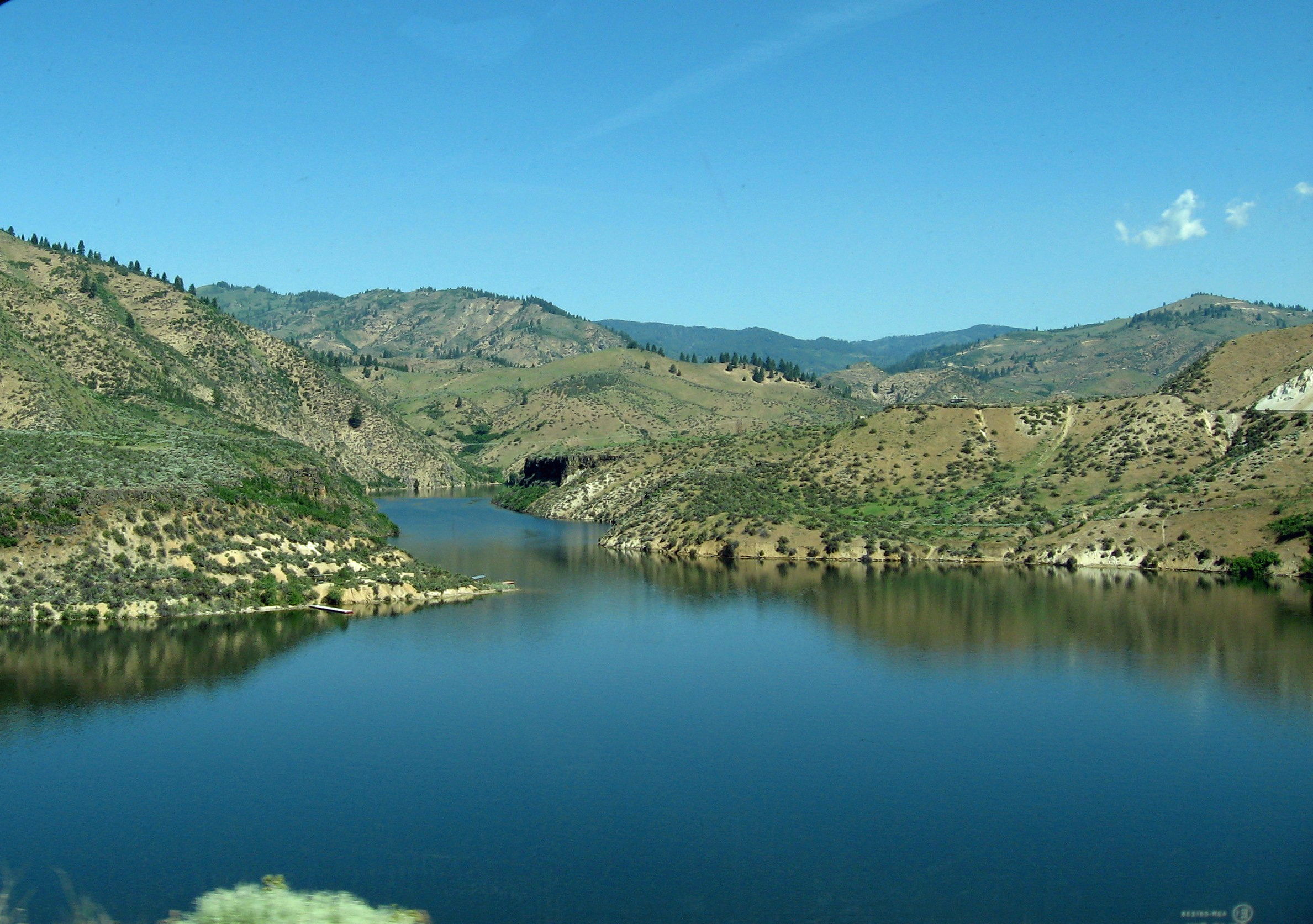
Lucky Peak Lake from Idaho highway 21

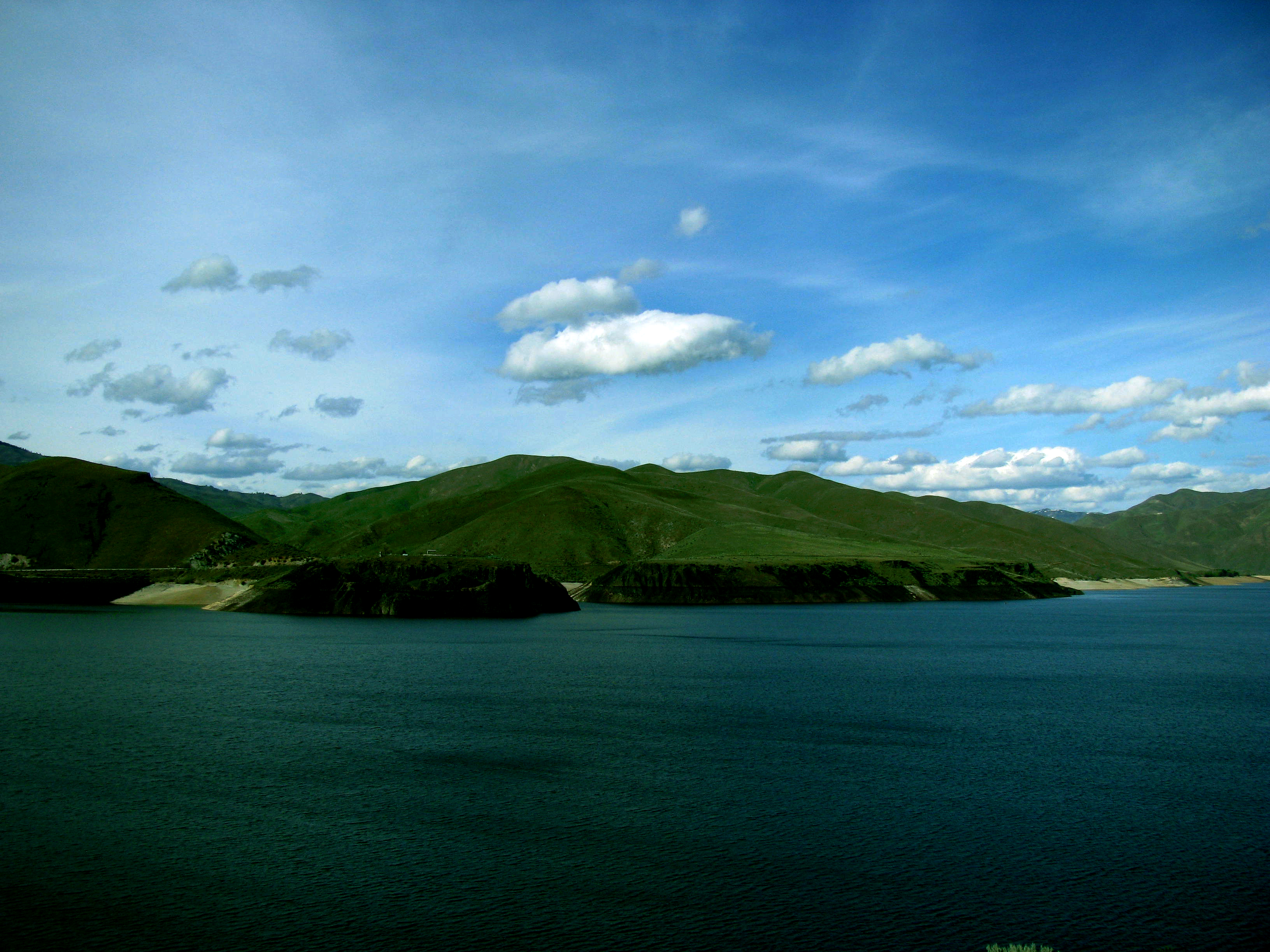
Lucky Peak Lake in April 2010
