= Boundary Creek (Alberta–Montana) =

Coordinates: 49°N 113.3566667°W

Boundary Creek is a cross-border tributary of the St. Mary River, flowing through Alberta in Canada and Montana in the United States.

Boundary Creek was named for the fact it crosses the Canada–United States border.

== See also ==
- List of rivers of Alberta
- List of rivers of Montana
