= Idaho Department of Lands =

State agency in Idaho, United States

Idaho Department of Lands (IDL)
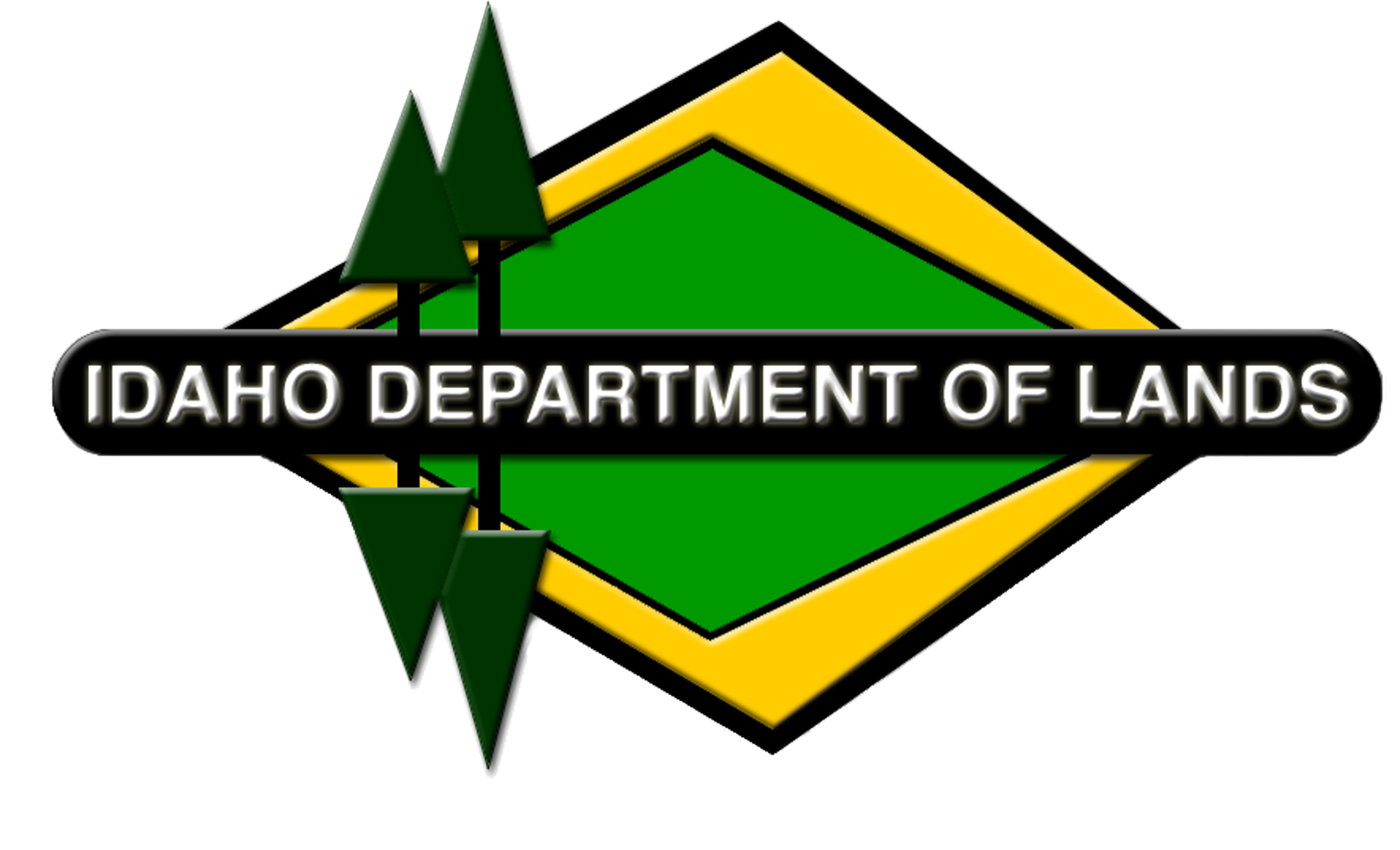

Agency overview
- Formed: 1919
- Preceding agencies: Department of Public Lands; Land Department
- Jurisdiction: Idaho
- Headquarters: 300 North 6th Street, Suite 103; Boise, Idaho; 83702
- Employees: 282 (2016)
- Agency executives: Dustin Miller, Director; William Haagenson, Deputy Director; Michele Andersen, Deputy Director
- Website: http://www.idl.idaho.gov/

The Idaho Department of Lands (IDL) is a state-level government agency of Idaho that manages State Trust Lands. IDL oversees forestry practices on state lands and some regulation of mining practices, as well as administering forestry programs and providing fire protection and prevention on state lands. IDL operates under the Idaho State Board of Land Commissioners and is the administrative arm of the Idaho Oil and Gas Conservation Commission.

The Idaho Department of Lands staffs 16 offices and manages 2.5 million acres under a constitutional mandate on State Trust Lands to maximize long term returns. These returns help fund Idaho public schools and other state institutions.

== Programs and responsibilities ==
Different duties under the IDL include the forestry program, fire program, mining industry regulations, and the Idaho oil and gas conservation commission.

=== Fire program ===
The IDL works for the protection of more than 6 million acres of land. The IDL is responsible for the fire protection and conservation of state and private forest lands. The IDL also provides services for families to help cope with losses due to forest fire. The IDL works in coordination with two timber protective associations, U.S. Forest Service, and the Idaho State Fire Plan Working Group.

=== Mining Industry Regulations ===
The IDL does regulate surface mining and the surface effects of underground mining in the state of Idaho. The IDL does not regulate patented and non-patented mining claims. The IDL does not regulate recreational suction dredge mining. Recreational dredge mining is regulated by the Stream Channel Protection Act administered by the Idaho Department of Water Resources (IDWR).

=== Forestry Management ===
Hundreds of professionals are employed by the IDL and are a part of the forestry related field. Timber assets are managed for the benefit and funding towards public schools and other beneficiaries. Private landowners are assisted by Private Forestry Specialists and harvest operators in order to keep forest protection laws in check and private sections of forests maintained.

Timber management is the main income for the endowment trust. The IDL heavily manages the harvest of timber on the state endowment trust forest lands. The IDL along with the Bureau of Land Management has responsibilities maintaining private forests and timber consumption and production.

== External internet links ==
- IDL Forestry Program
- United States Bureau of Land Management
- Idaho Forest Products Commission
- IDL Fire "Red Book"
- Environmental Science, Policy, and Research Institute (ESPRI)
