= Idaho Department of Fish and Game =

State agency in Idaho, United States

Coordinates: 43.602°N 116.186°W

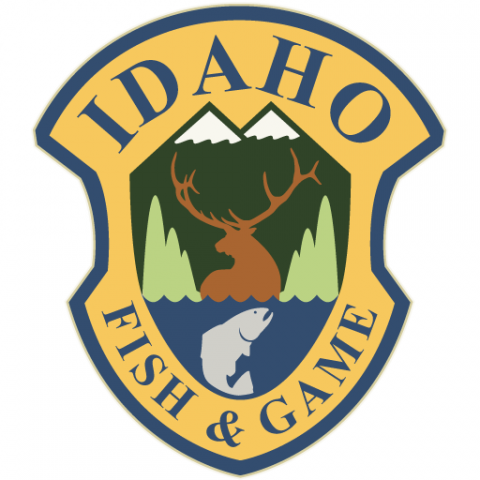

Agency overview
- Formed: 1899
- Jurisdiction: Government of Idaho
- Agency executive: Jim Fredericks, Director
- Website: https://idfg.idaho.gov/

The Idaho Department of Fish and Game (IDFG) is the Idaho state department which is responsible for preserving and managing Idaho's wildlife, including mammals, fish, birds, plants, and invertebrates.

== History ==
The Idaho Department of Fish and Game was established by the Idaho Legislature in 1899. The department was previously managed by a warden. In 1973, the department was reorganized, dividing the state into six regions and creating the position of state supervisor to manage the department.

On January 5, 1981, two IDFG officers, Bill Pogue and Conley Elms, were killed in remote Owyhee County. Wildlife trapper Claude Dallas was subsequently convicted of manslaughter in their deaths.

== Responsibilities ==
IDFG manages 32 wildlife management areas, including several that are jointly managed with the United States Forest Service and Bureau of Land Management. In addition, IDFG manages 19 fish hatcheries across the state.

== Headquarters ==
The department's headquarters in Boise on Walnut Street was the former site of Airway Park, the city's minor league baseball park from 1939 through 1963.

In summer 2019, it was announced that the headquarters would be demolished, with plans to construct a multilevel building in its place. Despite criticism from local historic preservation advocates, the building was demolished in summer of 2020.

== Programs ==
The department was tasked with relocating problem beavers in 1948. Beavers became a problem when new residents complained about beavers cutting down trees and creating dams. The Fish and Game Department understood that beavers help with the wetlands, they helped reduce erosion, and they create habitat for birds and fish, so they decided to move the animals. The department trapped 76 beavers that were parachuted into the meadows of Central Idaho. In 1949 the operation was deemed successful after officials observed the beavers had made homes in the new areas.

== Line of duty deaths ==
Since its establishment, 5 officers and 1 K9 of the IDFG have been killed in the line of duty

== See also ==
- List of law enforcement agencies in Idaho
- List of state and territorial fish and wildlife management agencies in the United States
