= Oakesdale, Washington =

Oakesdale
- Town
- Oakesdale, Washington
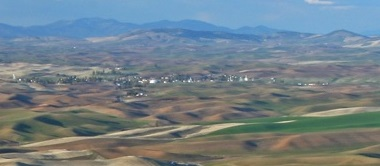
- Oakesdale as seen from Steptoe Butte.

- Location of Oakesdale, Washington
- Coordinates: 47°07′42″N 117°14′46″W
- Country: United States
- State: Washington
- County: Whitman

Government
  - Type: Mayor–council
  - Mayor: Dennis Palmer

Area
  - Total: 1.04 sq mi (2.69 km^{2})
  - Land: 1.04 sq mi (2.69 km^{2})
  - Water: 0 sq mi (0.00 km^{2})
- Elevation: 2,490 ft (760 m)

Population (2020)
  - Total: 395
  - Density: 380/sq mi (147/km^{2})
- Time zone: UTC-8 (Pacific (PST))
  - Summer (DST): UTC-7 (PDT)
- ZIP code: 99158
- Area code: 509
- FIPS code: 53-50325
- GNIS feature ID: 2413067
- Website: Town of Oakesdale

Oakesdale is a town in Whitman County, Washington, United States. The population was 395 at the 2020 census.

== History ==
Oakesdale was first settled in 1876 by James McCoy. The community was named after Thomas F. Oakes, a railroad official. Oakesdale was incorporated in 1890.

== Geography ==
According to the United States Census Bureau, the town has a total area of 1.04 square miles (2.69 km^{2}), all of it land.

== Demographics ==
Historical population
Census	Pop.	Note	%±
1890	528		—
1900	928		75.8%
1910	882		−5.0%
1920	816		−7.5%
1930	637		−21.9%
1940	590		−7.4%
1950	576		−2.4%
1960	474		−17.7%
1970	447		−5.7%
1980	444		−0.7%
1990	346		−22.1%
2000	420		21.4%
2010	422		0.5%
2020	395		−6.4%
U.S. Decennial Census

=== 2010 census ===
As of the 2010 census, there were 422 people, 166 households, and 123 families living in the town. The population density was 405.8 inhabitants per square mile (156.7/km^{2}). There were 196 housing units at an average density of 188.5 per square mile (72.8/km^{2}). The racial makeup of the town was 97.2% White, 0.5% Asian, 0.5% from other races, and 1.9% from two or more races. Hispanic or Latino of any race were 0.9% of the population.

There were 166 households, of which 32.5% had children under the age of 18 living with them, 60.8% were married couples living together, 6.6% had a female householder with no husband present, 6.6% had a male householder with no wife present, and 25.9% were non-families. 19.9% of all households were made up of individuals, and 10.8% had someone living alone who was 65 years of age or older. The average household size was 2.54 and the average family size was 2.90.

The median age in the town was 44.4 years. 25.1% of residents were under the age of 18; 6.4% were between the ages of 18 and 24; 19.6% were from 25 to 44; 30.3% were from 45 to 64; and 18.5% were 65 years of age or older. The gender makeup of the town was 47.6% male and 52.4% female.

=== 2000 census ===
As of the 2000 census, there were 420 people, 172 households, and 127 families living in the town. The population density was 404.2 people per square mile (155.9/km^{2}). There were 194 housing units at an average density of 186.7 per square mile (72.0/km^{2}). The racial makeup of the town was 98.33% White, 0.24% Asian, 0.95% from other races, and 0.48% from two or more races. Hispanic or Latino of any race were 0.95% of the population.

There were 172 households, out of which 34.3% had children under the age of 18 living with them, 64.5% were married couples living together, 7.6% had a female householder with no husband present, and 25.6% were non-families. 23.8% of all households were made up of individuals, and 14.5% had someone living alone who was 65 years of age or older. The average household size was 2.44 and the average family size was 2.88.

In the town, the age distribution of the population shows 25.7% under the age of 18, 3.8% from 18 to 24, 25.2% from 25 to 44, 26.7% from 45 to 64, and 18.6% who were 65 years of age or older. The median age was 43 years. For every 100 females, there were 97.2 males. For every 100 females age 18 and over, there were 91.4 males.

The median income for a household in the town was $31,094, and the median income for a family was $42,813. Males had a median income of $27,500 versus $30,714 for females. The per capita income for the town was $16,159. About 9.0% of families and 11.7% of the population were below the poverty line, including 21.2% of those under age 18 and 4.3% of those age 65 or over.

== Notable native ==
- Virgil T. McCroskey, creator of Steptoe Butte State Park and McCroskey State Park

== See also ==
- List of towns in Washington (state)
