= McCroskey State Park =

State park in Idaho, United States

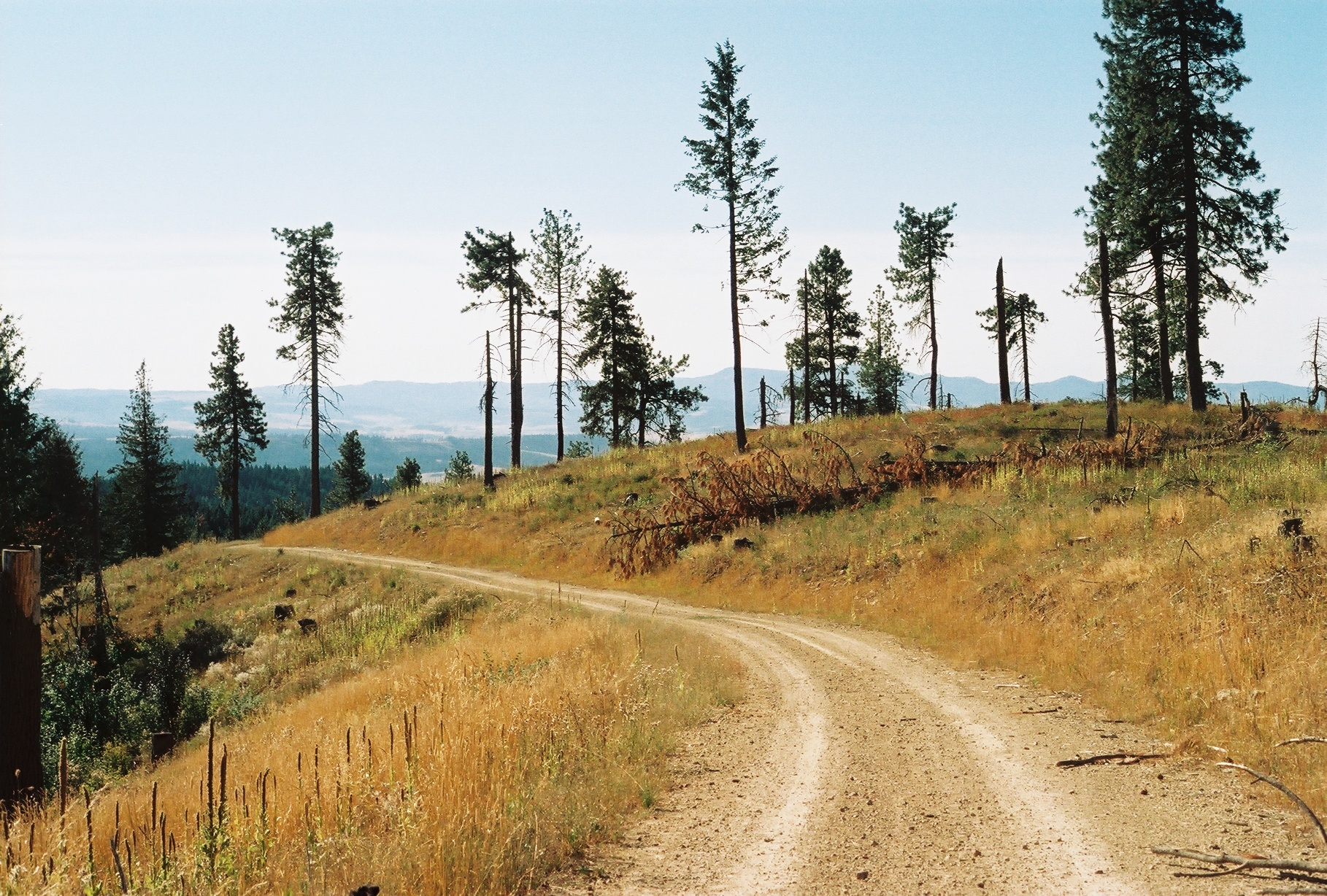
- Skyline Drive

- Location within Idaho Location within the United States
- Location: Benewah and Latah counties, Idaho, United States
- Nearest city: Tensed, Idaho
- Coordinates: 47°03′54″N 116°57′01″W
- Area: 5,300 acres (2,100 ha)
- Elevation: 3,039–4,324 ft (926–1,318 m)
- Established: 1955
- Administrator: Idaho Department of Parks and Recreation
- Named for: Mary Minerva McCroskey
- Website: Official website

McCroskey State Park—officially Mary Minerva McCroskey State Park—is a public recreation area in the Pacific Northwest of the United States, located in the Palouse region of northern Idaho. The park's 5,300 acres (2,100 ha) stretch along a ridge in Latah and Benewah Counties, along the border with Washington.

== History ==
McCroskey State Park was given to the state of Idaho in 1955 by a local conservationist, Virgil T. McCroskey (1876–1970), who gradually bought up land endangered by logging and cobbled his purchases into a 4,400-acre (18 km^{2}) parcel. To make the land more attractive to tourists, he cut viewpoints into some of the slopes, built picnic areas, planted flowers, and established a road.

The state legislature, however, had serious doubts about the new park – thinking it would not generate enough revenue to justify the loss in taxes – and agreed to accept the gift only if McCroskey, then in his late seventies, maintained the park at his own expense for the next fifteen years. McCroskey accepted the terms, and lived exactly fifteen more years, fulfilling his obligation to the state of Idaho just weeks before his death in 1970 at age 93.

McCroskey named the park in honor of his mother Mary, a pioneer woman who left Tennessee with her husband and children and came to eastern Washington to establish a homestead near Steptoe Butte; she died when Virgil was 14, and he dedicated it to all pioneer women.

After his death, the park received less than adequate attention from the state for nearly two decades, until the late 1980s.

== Description ==
McCroskey State Park occupies the rocky slopes of Skyline Ridge on Mineral Mountain, in a transitional zone between the Palouse prairie to the west (and south) and the Rocky Mountains to the east. The park's chief attraction is a narrow unimproved road called Skyline Drive, which winds for 18 miles (30 km) along a steep ridge, climbing through dense cedar forest that gives way to stands of ponderosa pine and, eventually, to prairie. The road also links a scattering of interpretive signs and vista points.

In addition, there are 32 miles (51 km) of trails open to hiking, mountain biking, horses, and all-terrain vehicles. Picnic areas, pit toilets and primitive campsites are available, along with a single source of drinking water near the midpoint of Skyline Drive. Since the park is large, remote, and underutilized, it provides excellent habitat for an assortment of wildlife, including deer, moose, and black bears. Despite McCroskey's "park" status, however, significant logging still takes place within park boundaries.

The park lies about ten miles (16 km) north of Potlatch. The best access point is from Highway 95, but visitors can also enter the park from Farmington road on the west side, a few miles north of Farmington, Washington. On the Farmington side, the only indication of the park's presence is the Skyline Drive sign, and the roads are much rougher.

== Gallery ==
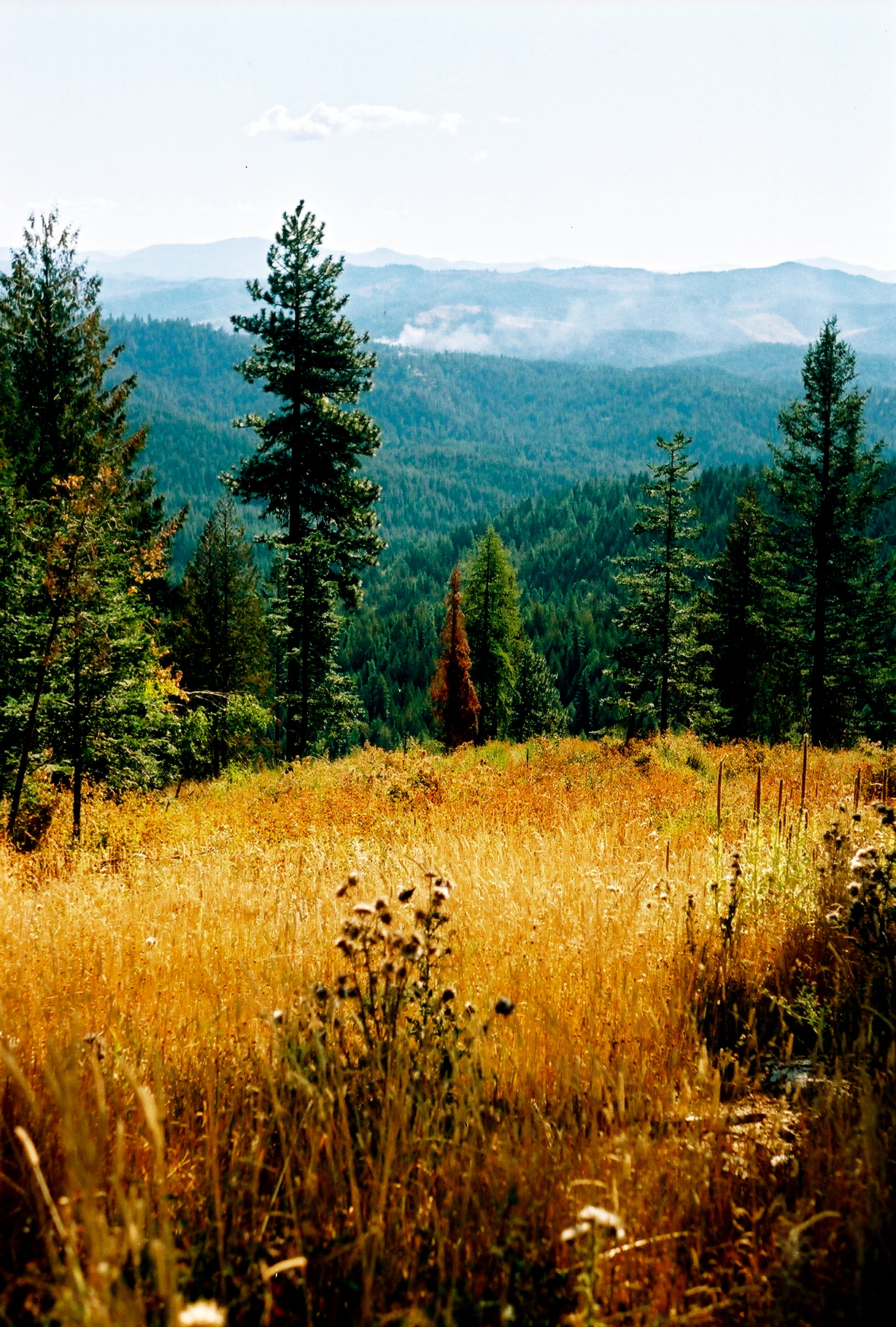
Looking south from Skyline Drive

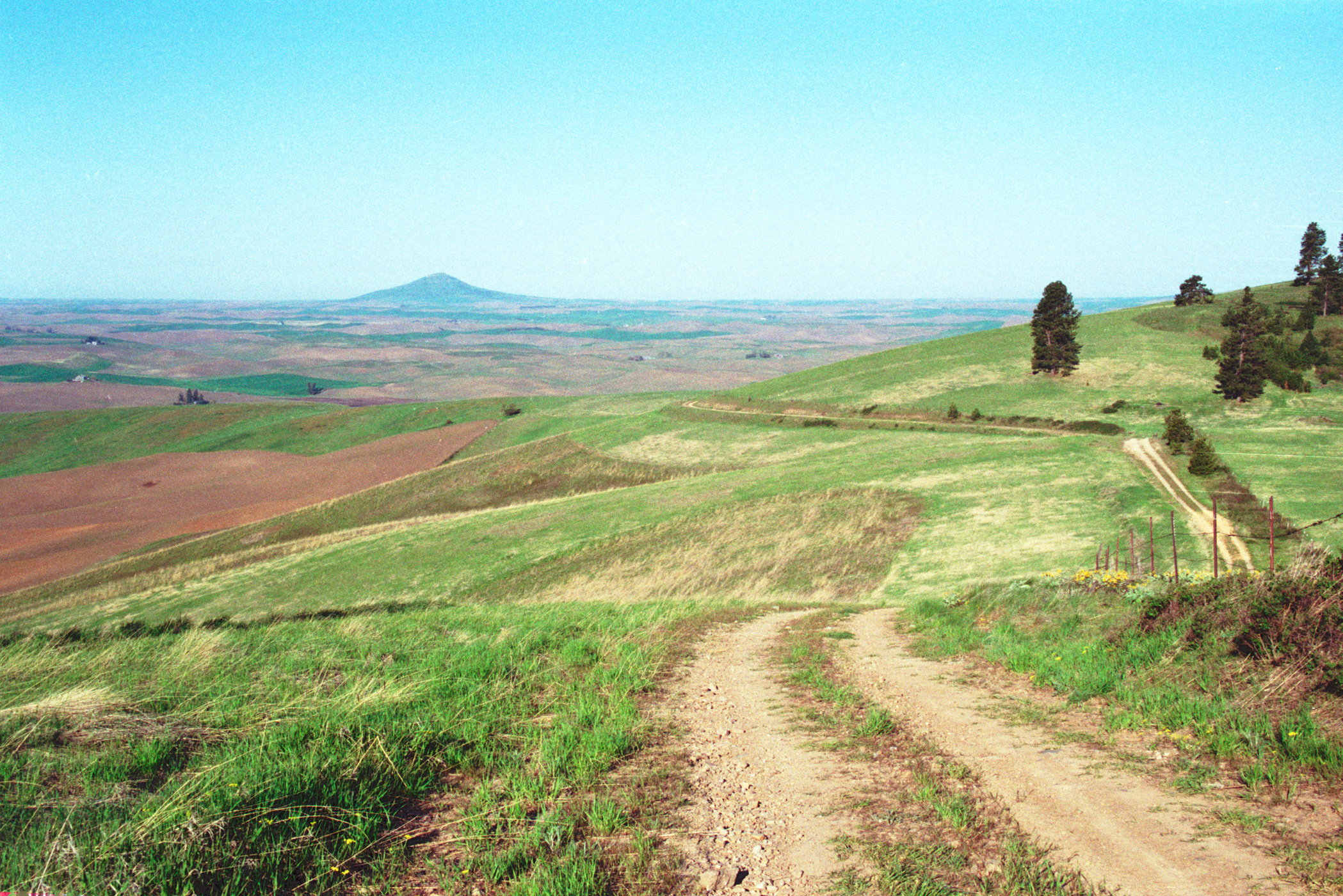
Skyline Drive with Steptoe Butte in background

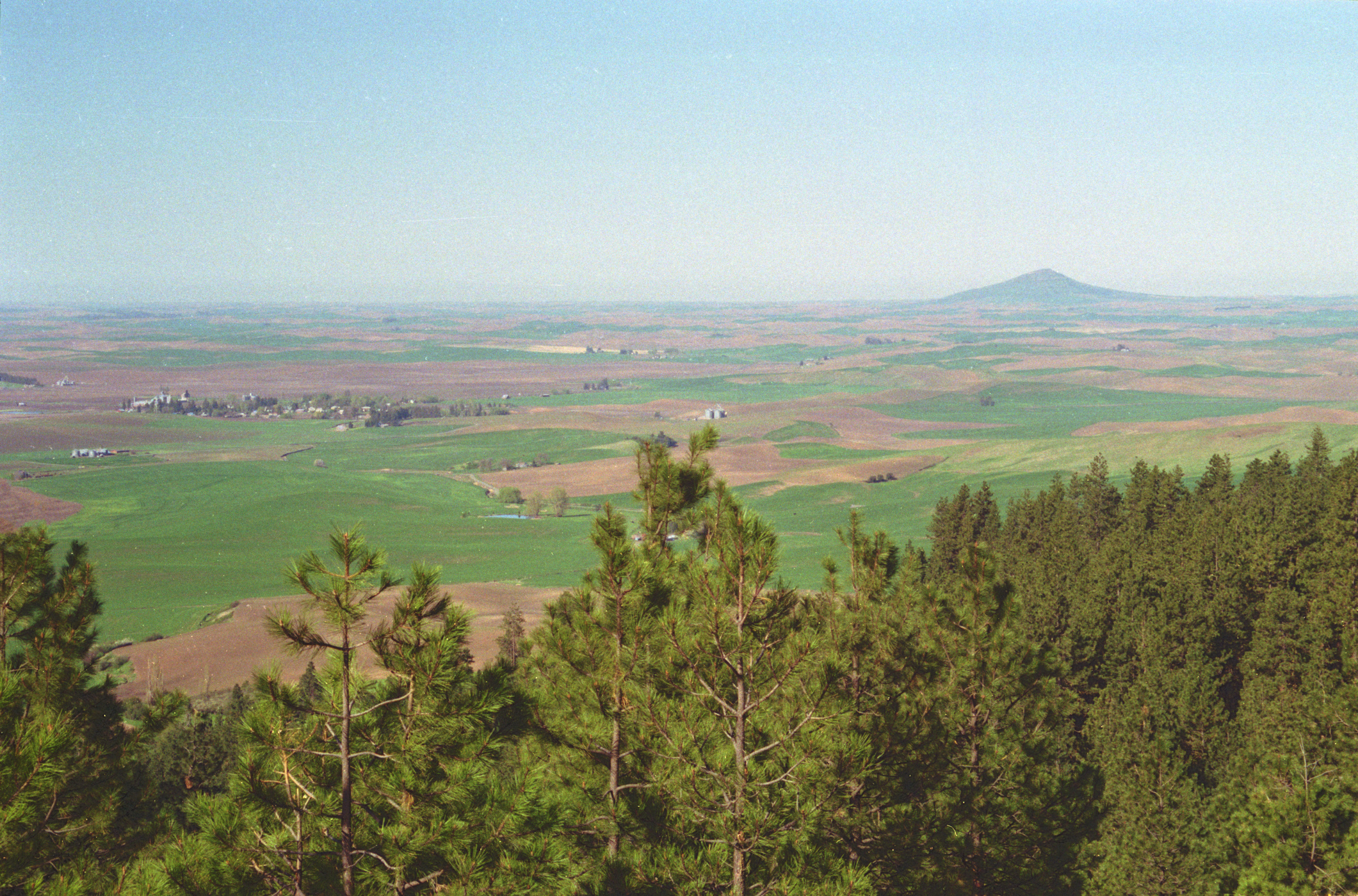
View of Farmington, WA and Steptoe Butte

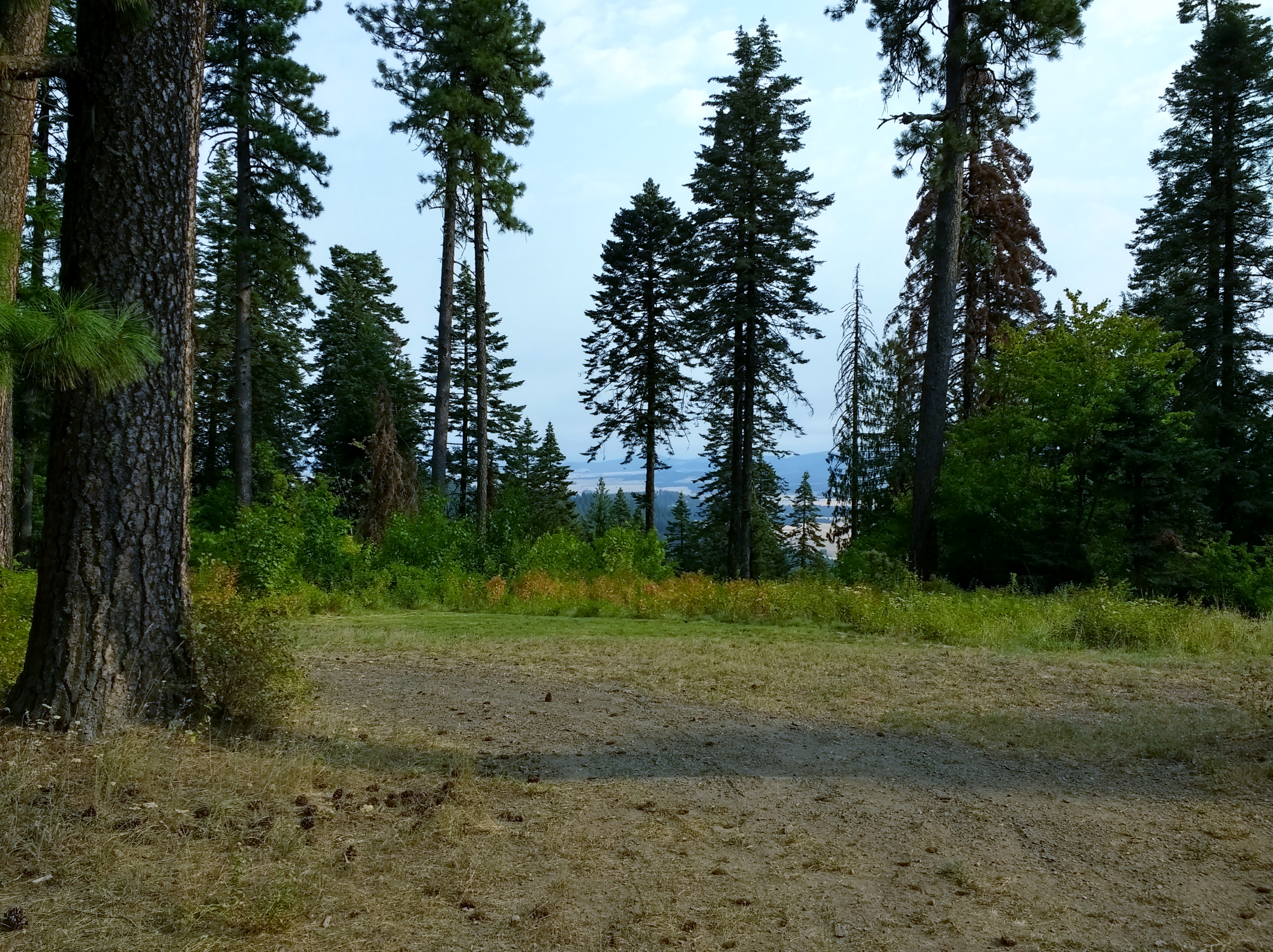
Scenic view from Fireplace Day Use Area

== See also ==
- List of Idaho state parks
- National Parks in Idaho
