= Virgil T. McCroskey =

American conservationist (1876–1970)

Virgil McCroskey
- Born: October 5, 1876; Rockville, Tennessee
- Died: September 14, 1970 (aged 93); Oakesdale, Washington
- Resting place: Colfax Cemetery; Colfax, Washington
- Education: Washington State College (Pharmacy, 1903)
- Occupations: Pharmacist, conservationist
- Parent(s): Joshua Philander T. McCroskey (1828–1910); Mary Minerva Gallaher McCroskey (1840–1891)

Virgil Talmadge McCroskey (October 5, 1876 – September 14, 1970) was an American conservationist who spent most of his life in eastern Washington. He created two state parks on the Palouse: Steptoe Butte State Park in Washington and McCroskey State Park in Idaho.

== Early years ==
Born in Monroe County, Tennessee, McCroskey was the ninth of ten children born to Joshua Philander Theodore McCroskey and Mary Minerva Gallaher McCroskey, who moved from Tennessee and settled in eastern Washington in 1879 as pioneers and established a homestead near the foot of Steptoe Butte.

McCroskey arrived in Washington at age two as a child; Steptoe Butte was his playground. He earned a degree in pharmacy at Washington State College in Pullman and in 1903 purchased the Elk Drug Store in Colfax, the facade of which still bears his name. Although he never married, during this period he raised two orphaned nieces and a nephew. McCroskey inherited his parents' farm in 1910 and retired from the pharmacy business in 1920. He spent the next few years traveling the world; he also drove all over the West, visiting national parks.

== Conservation activities ==
When McCroskey returned from his travels, he at first contented himself with planting trees and flowers to beautify the family farm. Soon, however, he began a second career as an amateur conservationist, using his money and energies to cobble together parcels of land for two new state parks. Eventually, he sold his farm to raise revenue and moved to nearby Oakesdale. He first focused his efforts on Steptoe Butte, an island of ancient rock rising high above the surrounding palouse country and locally famous for the view from the top. Steptoe Butte State Park was dedicated on July 4, 1946, becoming Washington's 72nd state park. In 1965, at a ceremony declaring Steptoe Butte a National Natural Landmark, McCroskey was the guest of honor.

Once this project was completed, McCroskey turned his attention to preserving Skyline Ridge in Idaho, easily visible from Steptoe Butte. It was an area of old-growth forest just over the border in southwestern Benewah County which was increasingly threatened by logging. In 1951, after he had accumulated 2,000 acres (8.1 km^{2}), he began trying to gift the land to Idaho for a state park. The Idaho legislature, however, was unenthusiastic, thinking that the park would not generate enough tourist revenue to pay for the park's upkeep and to make up for the loss to the tax rolls. McCroskey did not give up. He added 2,400 acres (9.7 km^{2}) more to the parcel over the next three years and on August 7, 1955, after McCroskey, then 79 years old, agreed to maintain the park at his own expense for the next fifteen years, Mary Minerva McCroskey State Park finally became a reality.

McCroskey lived fifteen more years – almost exactly long enough to fulfill his obligation to the state of Idaho. He continued improving the park (often working with his own hands) until shortly before his death at the age of 93.

== Legacy ==
Steptoe Butte State Park, an easily accessed and highly visible landmark, receives many visitors, most of whom simply drive to the top to enjoy the view for a few minutes. McCroskey State Park, however, despite its larger size and much greater recreational opportunities, has long been neglected and underutilized. In recent years, however, the situation has begun to change as more people become aware of the park's wildlife, scenery, and thirty miles (48 km) of trails.

== Images ==
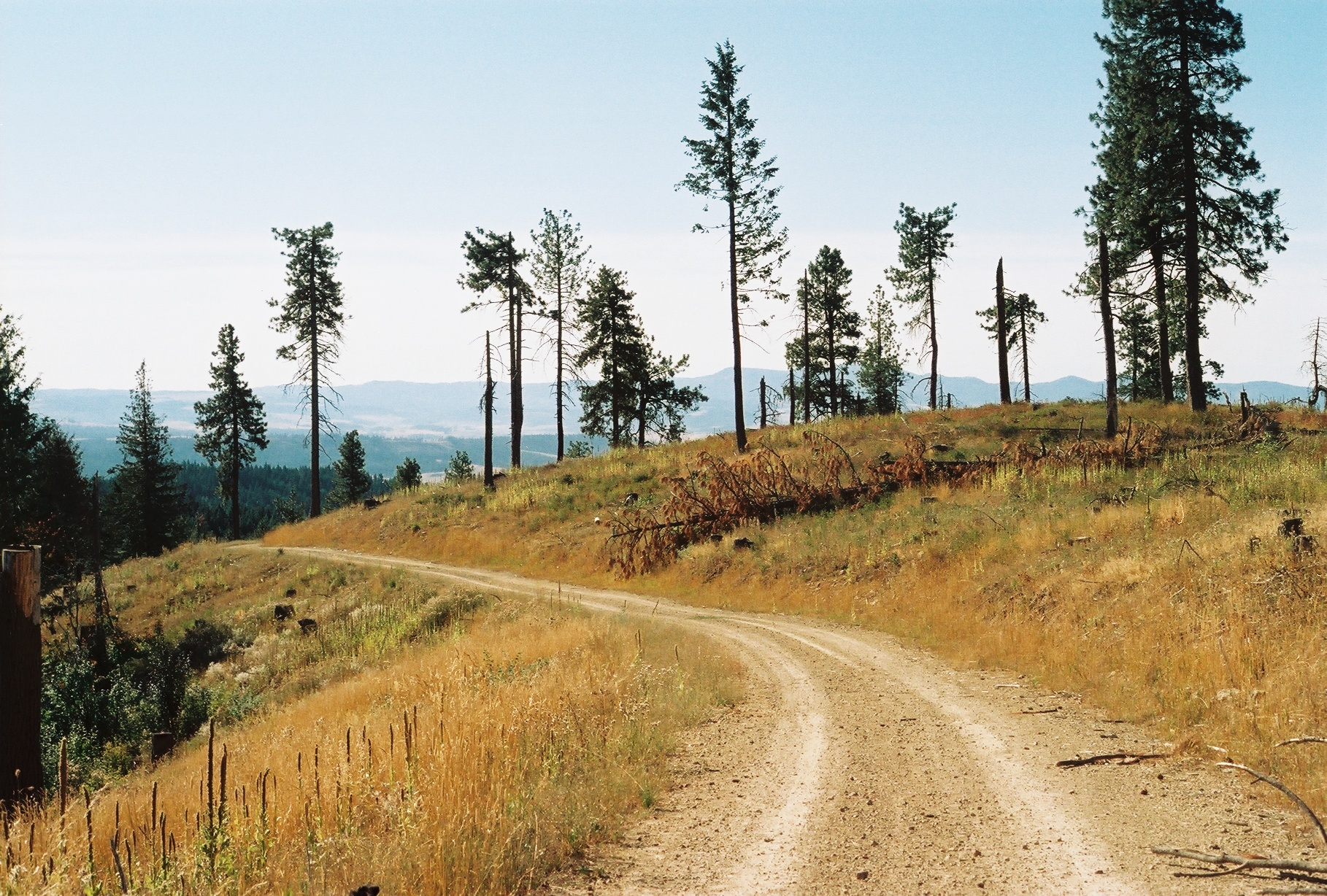
Skyline Drive, looking west. McCroskey did much of the roadbuilding himself.

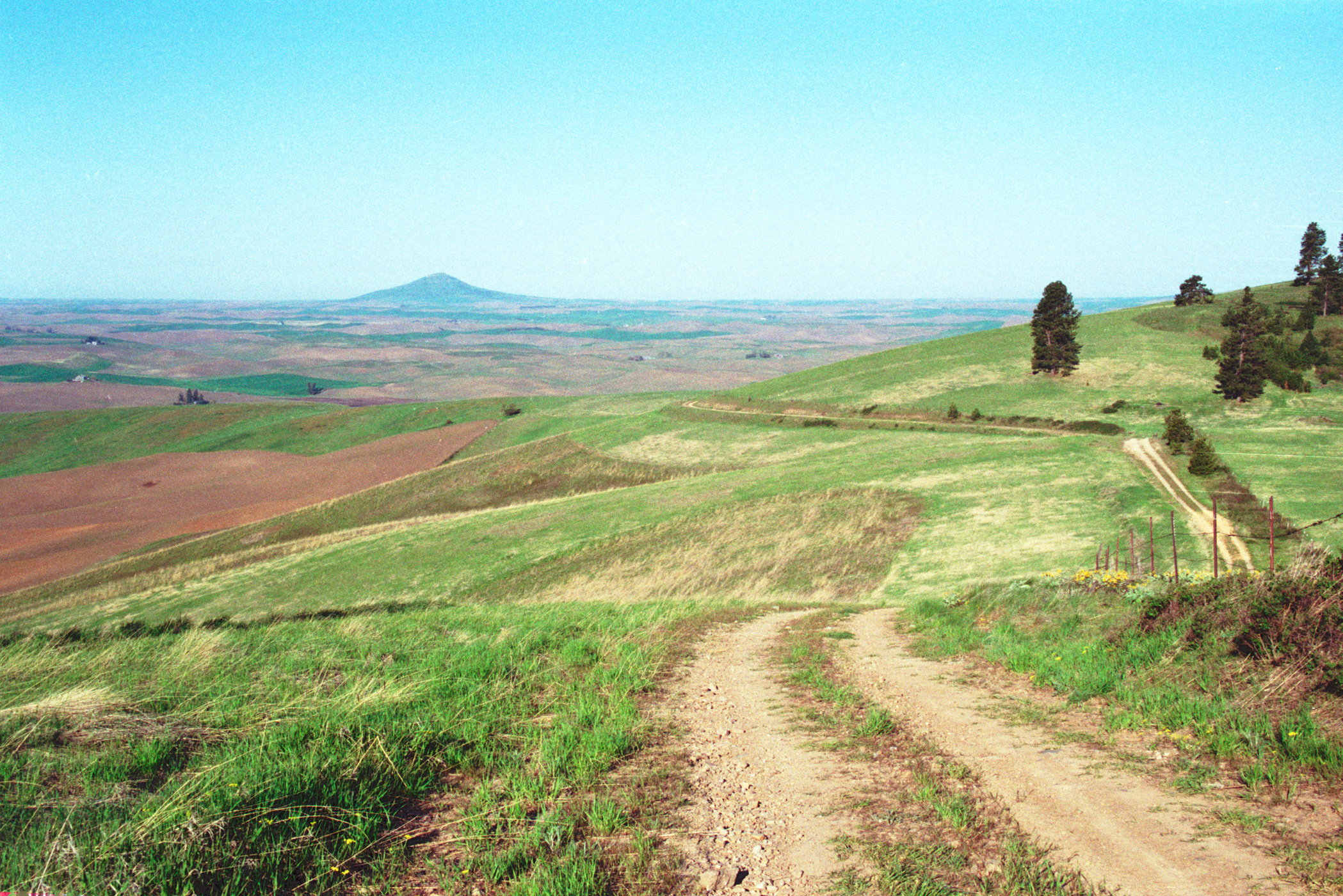
Skyline Drive with Steptoe Butte in background.

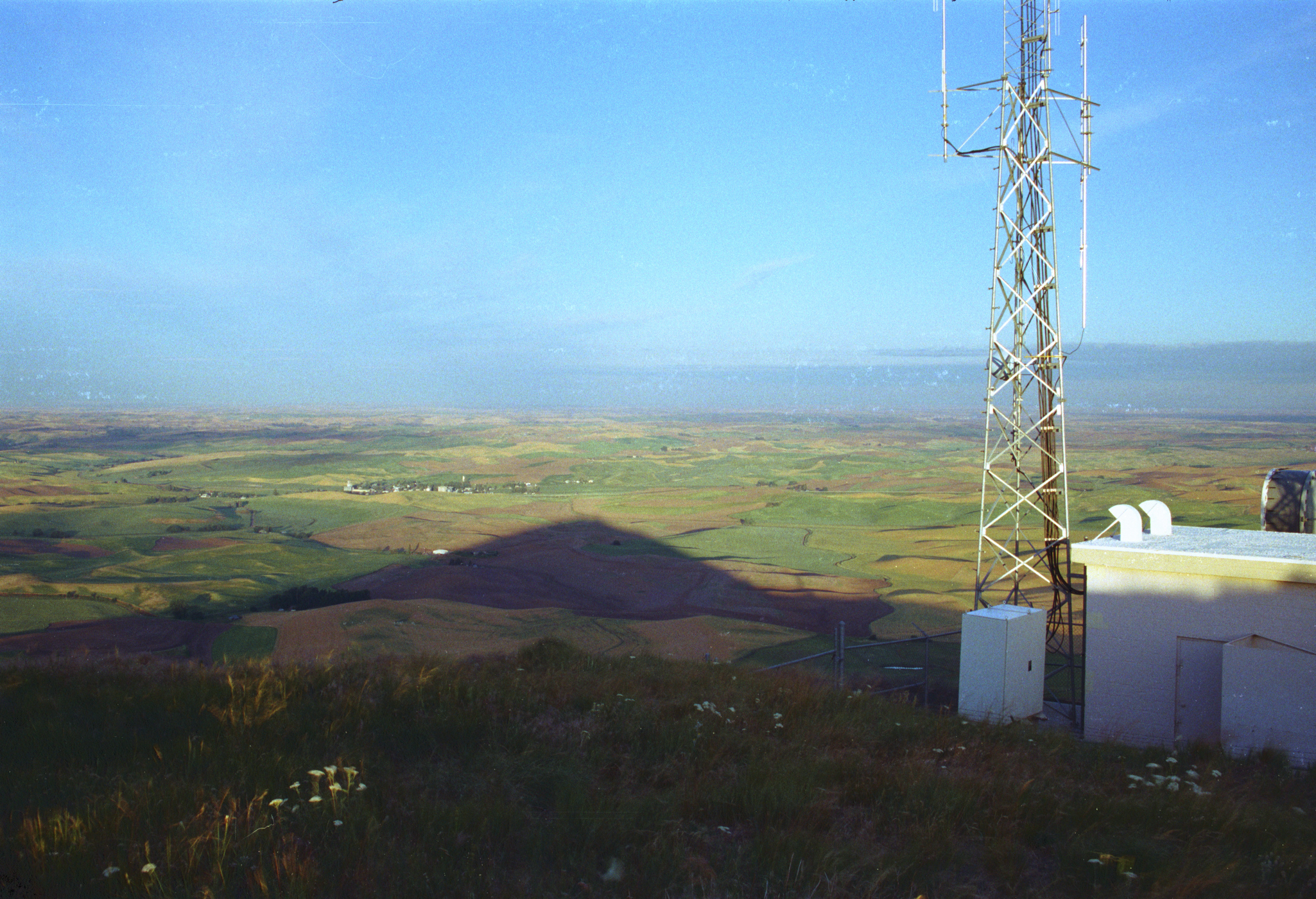
View from the top of Steptoe Butte. McCroskey strenuously objected to the telecommunications equipment.
