= Kamiak Butte =

Summit in Whitman County, Washington

Kamiak Butte County Park
- The southern slopes of Kamiak Butte, with wheat fields beyond
- Interactive map of Kamiak Butte County Park
- Location: Whitman County, Washington, USA
- Coordinates: 46°51′56″N 117°09′49″W
- Area: 298 acres (121 ha)
- Operator: Whitman County Parks and Recreation Department
- Website: Kamiak Butte County Park

U.S. National Natural Landmark
- Designated: 1965

Kamiak Butte County Park is located in Whitman County, Washington between the towns of Palouse and Pullman in Eastern Washington, near the border of Idaho. It is named after Chief Kamiakin of the Yakama tribe. Most of the park's 298 acres (121 ha) consist of timberland on the northern slopes of Kamiak Butte. The park includes Pine Ridge Trail, a National Recreation Trail within the National Trails System. Kamiak Butte and nearby Steptoe Butte comprise Steptoe and Kamiak Buttes National Natural Landmark. This 1,144-acre (463 ha) area, designated in 1965, includes land in state and county ownership.

The mountain itself is an "island," consisting of Precambrian quartzite projecting approximately 1,000 feet (300 m) above the surrounding wheat fields. The reddish rocks once formed the bed of an ancient sea, and the grains of sand embedded in them can still be seen glittering in the sun. Later in its geological history, Kamiak Butte became part of a mountain range which was eventually nearly engulfed by the Cenozoic lava flows that covered most of Eastern Washington in a layer of basalt. Steptoe and Kamiak Buttes are outliers of Idaho's Coeur d'Alene Mountains.

The region's intensive wheat and lentil farming has made Kamiak Butte an important haven for indigenous plant and animal species. Over 170 plant species, 140 bird species, and 30 mammal species have been observed inside the park.

For most visitors, the park's chief attraction is the Pine Ridge Trail, a 3.5-mile (5.6 km) loop which begins at a parking area and climbs through evergreen forestland to an exposed ridge. The trail continues along the ridge, affording views of the surrounding Palouse country before dropping back into the forest. A short "summit spur" leads to the mountain's highest point – a rocky promontory on the west side with an elevation of 3,641 feet (1,110 m). Camping is available all year, except during periods of drought, when it is often prohibited due to fire danger. Interpretive programs are offered in the spring and summer months; other amenities include an amphitheater, picnic tables, outdoor grills, covered shelters, restrooms, and a playground.

For ham/amateur radio operators, two linked repeaters are near the top of the mountain. The frequencies are 146.74 MHz, with a 600 kHz negative offset, a PL Tone of 100 Hz (the 2 meter repeater), and 53.75 MHz, with a 1.7 MHz negative offset, and a PL Tone of 100 Hz (the 6 meter repeater).

== Images ==
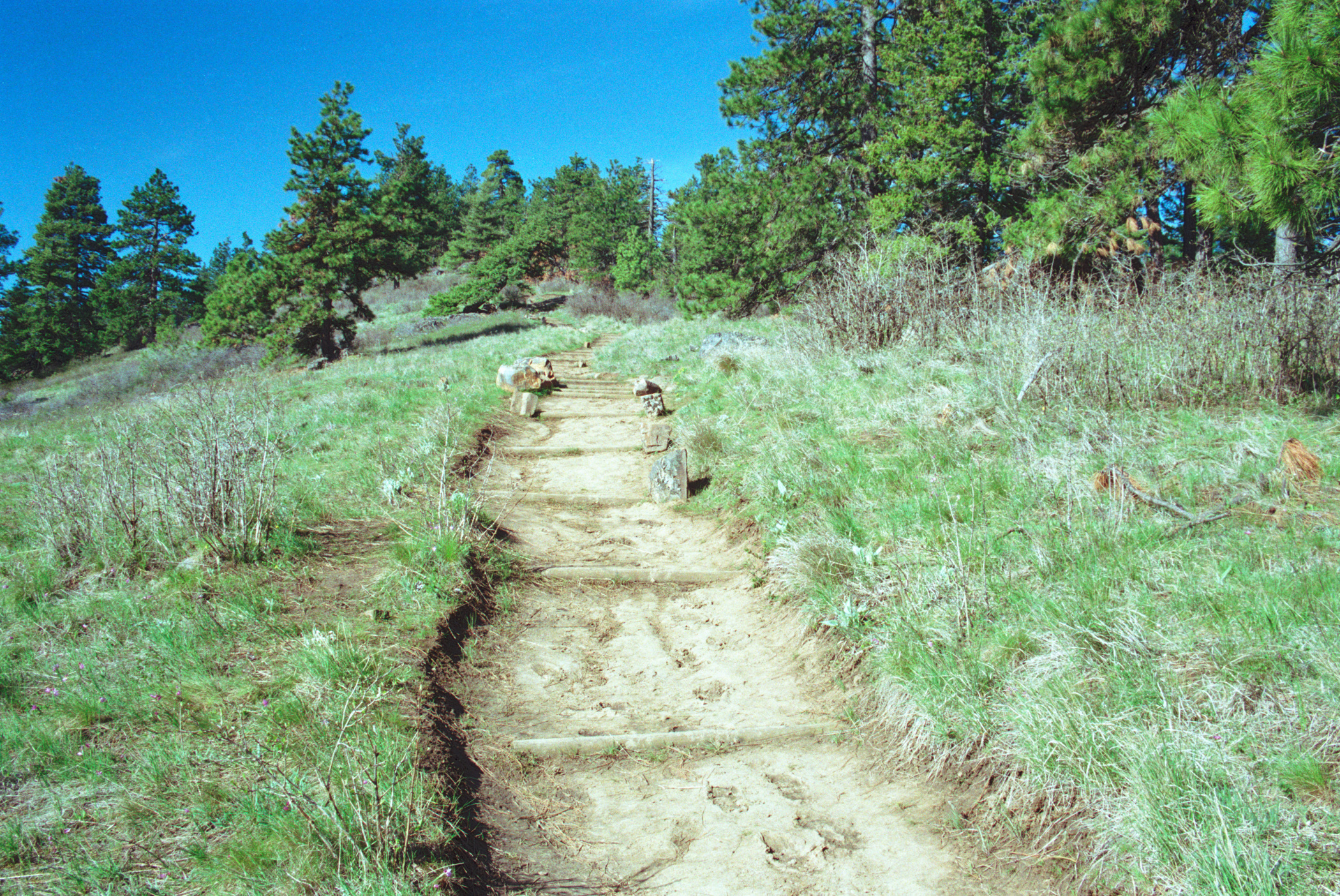
Pine Ridge Trail on Kamiak Butte

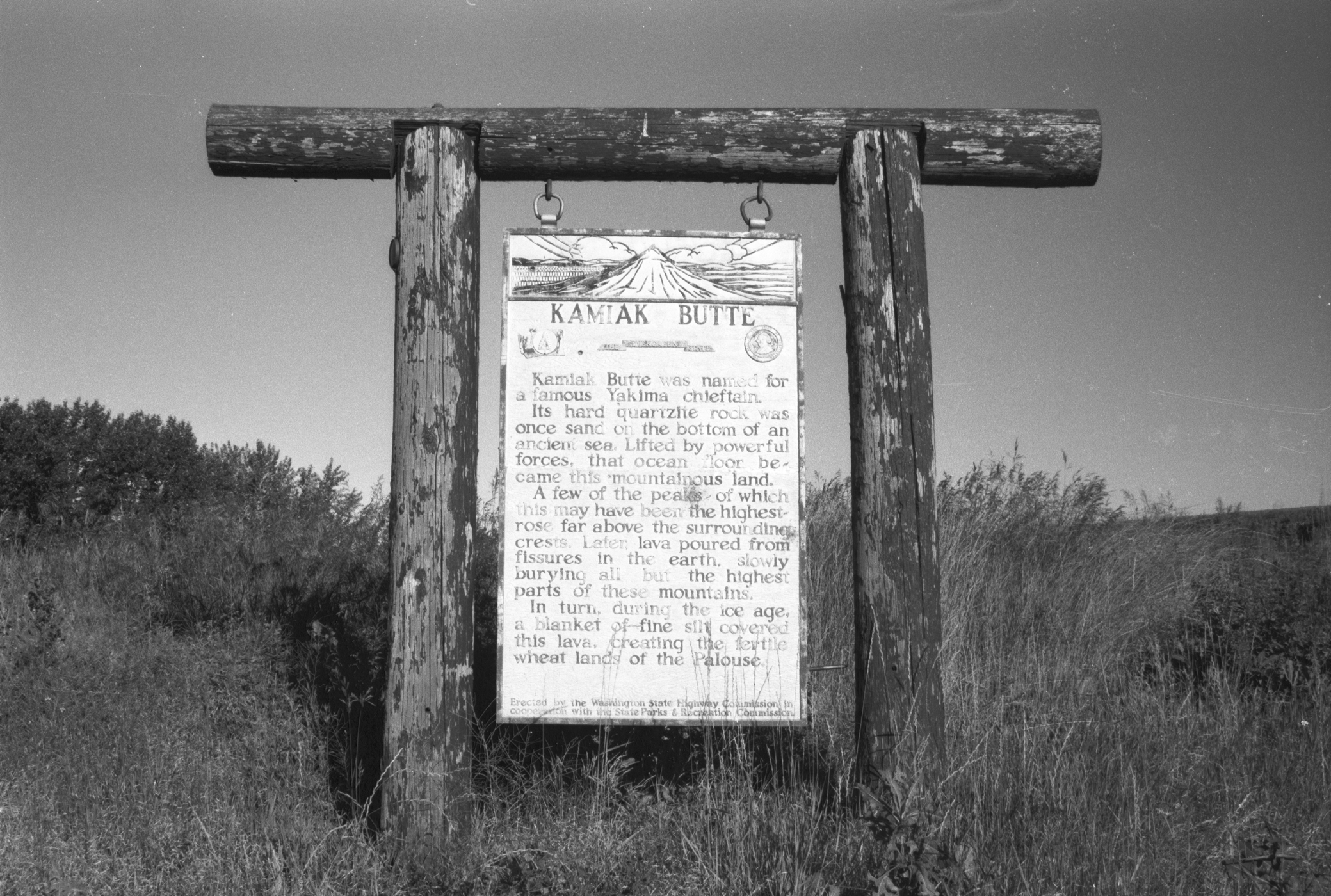
Kamiak Butte information sign

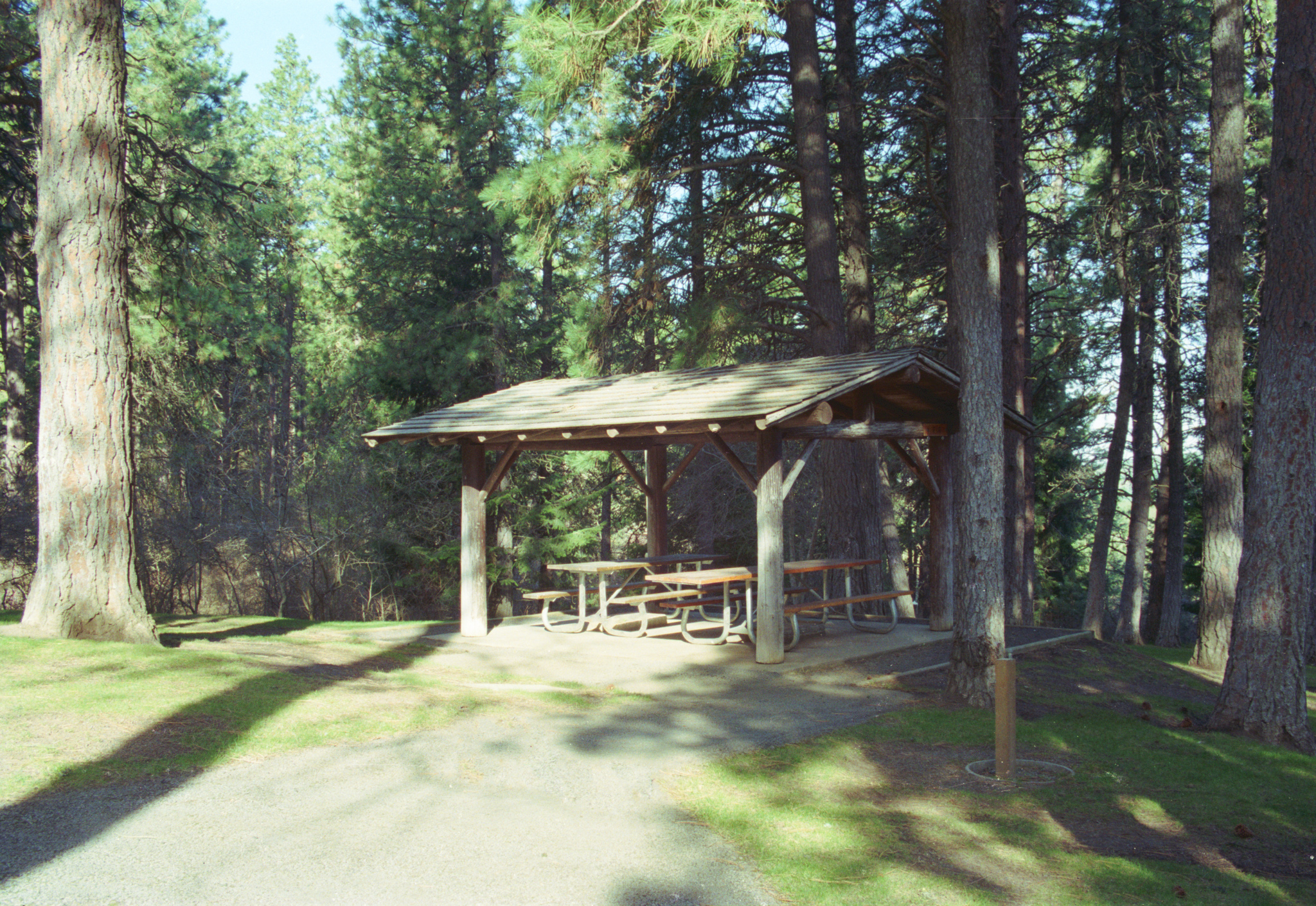
Picnic table at Kamiak Butte
