= Steptoe Butte =

Hill in Washington state, United States

Steptoe Butte State Park Heritage Site
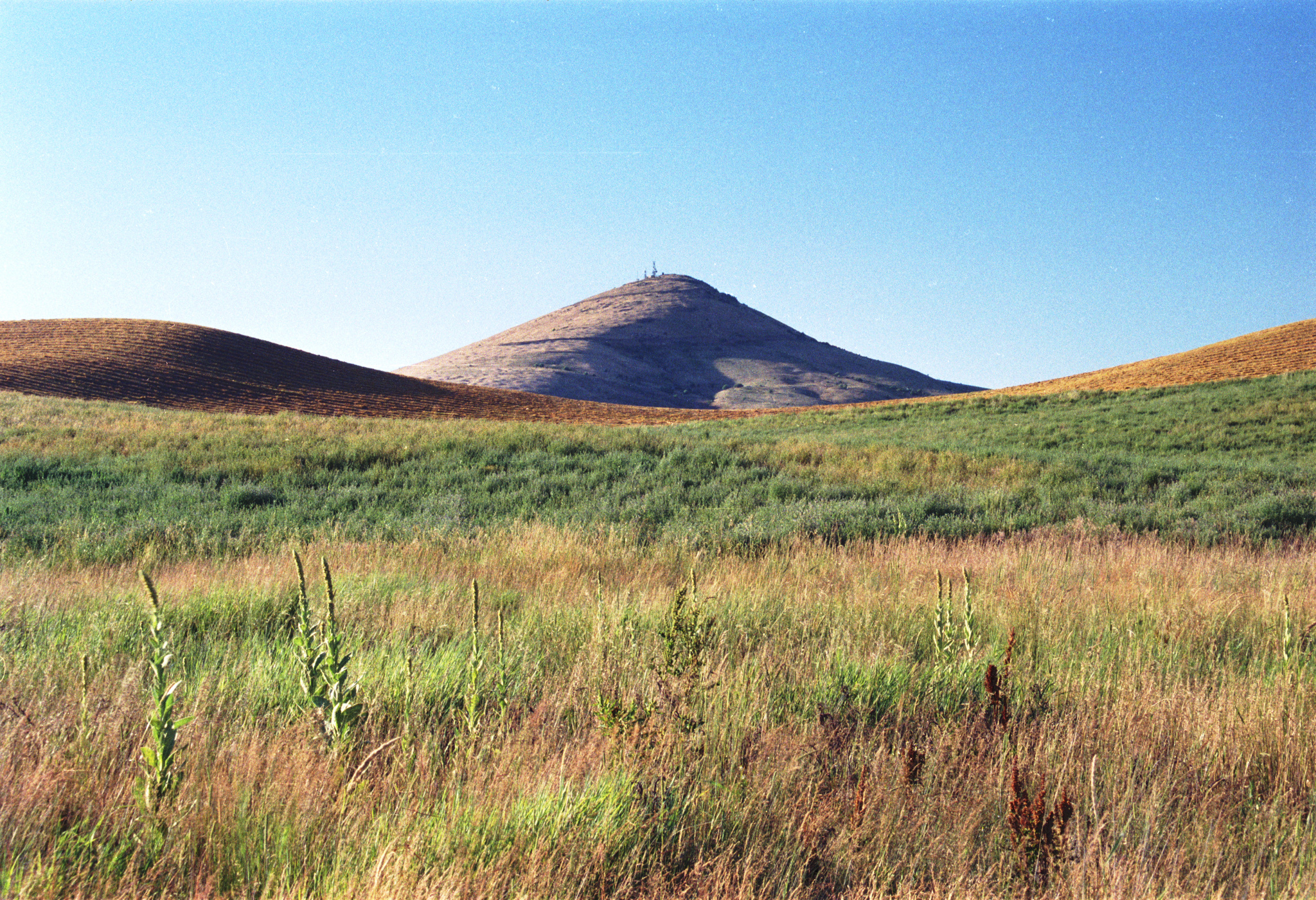
- Steptoe Butte

- Location within Washington (state) Location within the United States
- Location: Whitman County, Washington, United States
- Nearest city: Colfax, Washington
- Coordinates: 47°01′56″N 117°17′48″W
- Area: 150 acres (61 ha)
- Elevation: 3,609 ft (1,100 m)
- Established: 1946
- Administrator: Washington State Parks and Recreation Commission
- Website: Official website

U.S. National Natural Landmark
- Designated: 1965

Steptoe Butte is a quartzite island jutting out of the silty loess of the Palouse hills in Whitman County, Washington, in the northwest United States. The 3,612-foot (1,101 m) butte is preserved as Steptoe Butte State Park Heritage Site, a publicly owned 150-acre (61 ha) recreation area located 12 miles (19 km) north of Colfax.

Steptoe Butte and nearby Kamiak Butte comprise Steptoe and Kamiak Buttes National Natural Landmark. This 1,144-acre (463 ha) area, designated in 1965, includes land in state and county ownership.

== Geology ==
The rock that forms the butte is over 400 million years old, in contrast with the 15–7 million year old Columbia River Basalts that underlie the rest of the Palouse. Steptoe Butte has become an archetype, as isolated protrusions of bedrock, such as summits of hills or mountains, in lava flows have come to be called "steptoes". Steptoe and Kamiak Buttes are outliers of Idaho's Coeur d'Alene Mountains.

- Elevation: 3,612 feet (1,101 m) above sea level, approximately 1,000 feet (300 m) above the surrounding countryside (prominence).
- Visibility: Up to 70–100 miles (110–160 km). Mount Spokane is easily visible, 70 miles (110 km) to the north.

== History ==
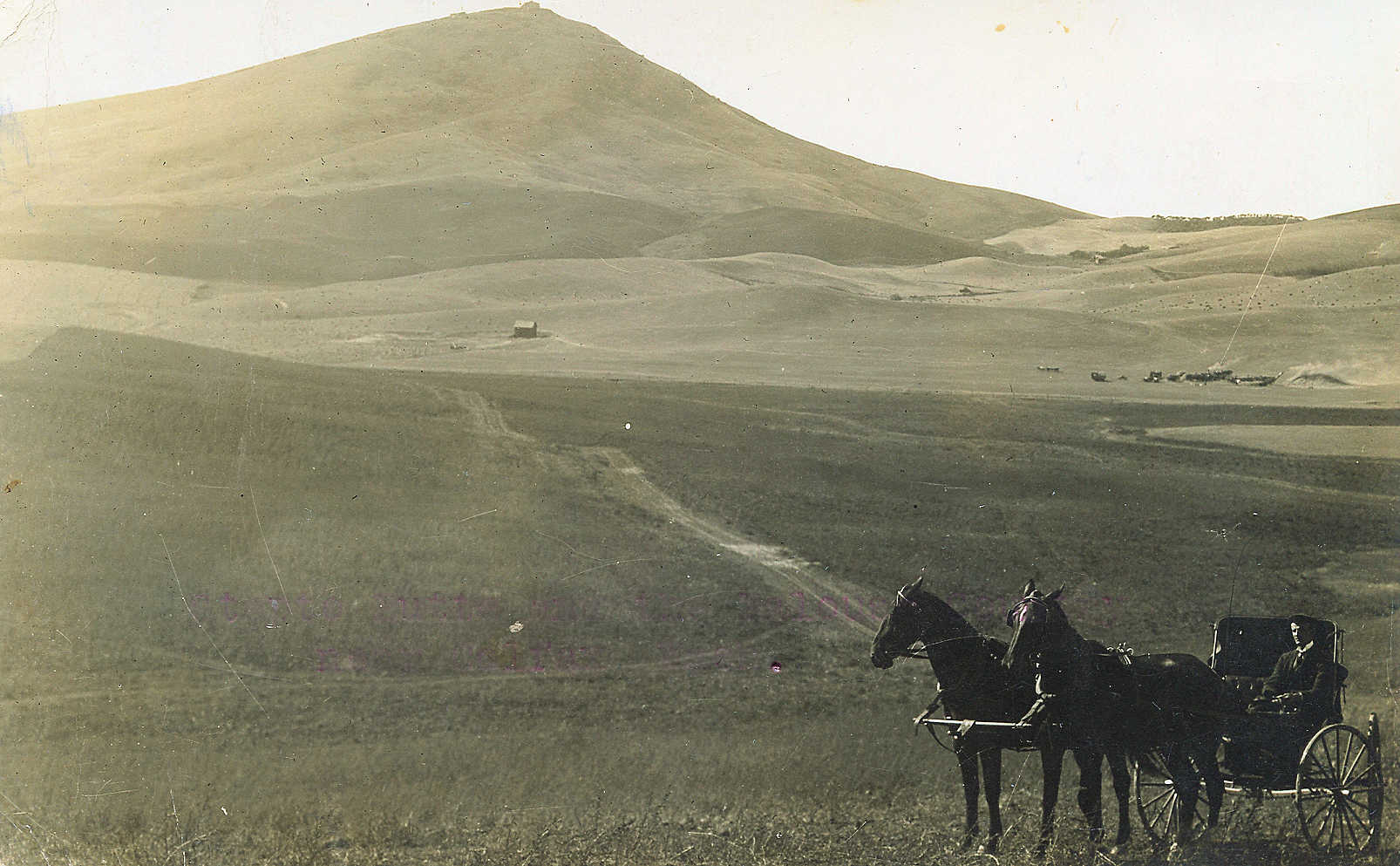
Steptoe Butte circa 1910

The butte was named after Colonel Edward Steptoe. A hotel built by James S. "Cashup" Davis stood atop the butte from 1888 to 1908, burning down in 1911. In 1946, Virgil McCroskey donated 120 acres (49 ha) of land to form the park, which was later increased to over 150 acres (61 ha). The east, south and west portions of the butte were purchased in 2016 by two couples Kent and Elaine Bassett, and Ray and Joan Folwell. The owners planned to protect their 437 acres (177 ha) of land from development, eventually donating it to the state. This plan came to fruition when they sold the land to the Washington State Department of Natural Resources in December 2021.

== Activities and amenities ==
A narrow paved road winds around the butte, leading to a parking area at the summit. The park offers picnicking facilities and an interpretive wayside exhibit. Popular activities include sight-seeing, paragliding, hang gliding, kite and model airplane flying, and photography.

== Gallery ==
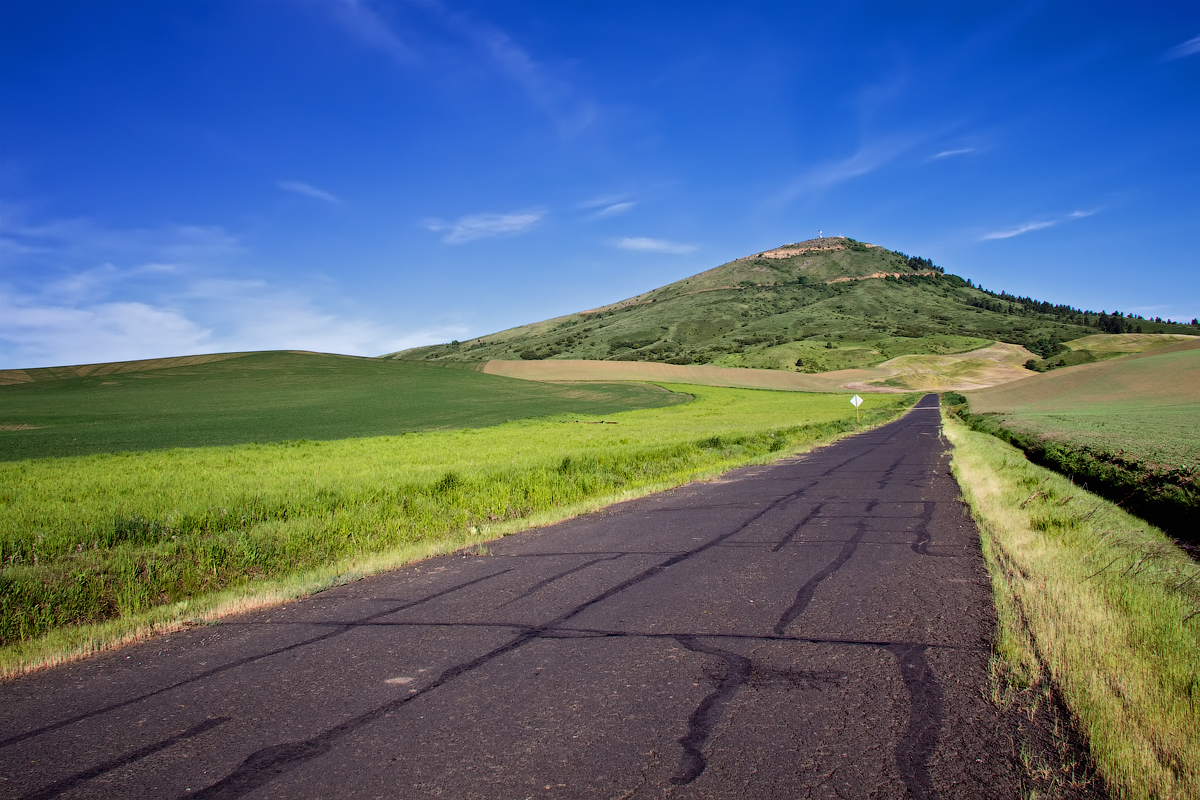
A paved road takes visitors to the top of the park

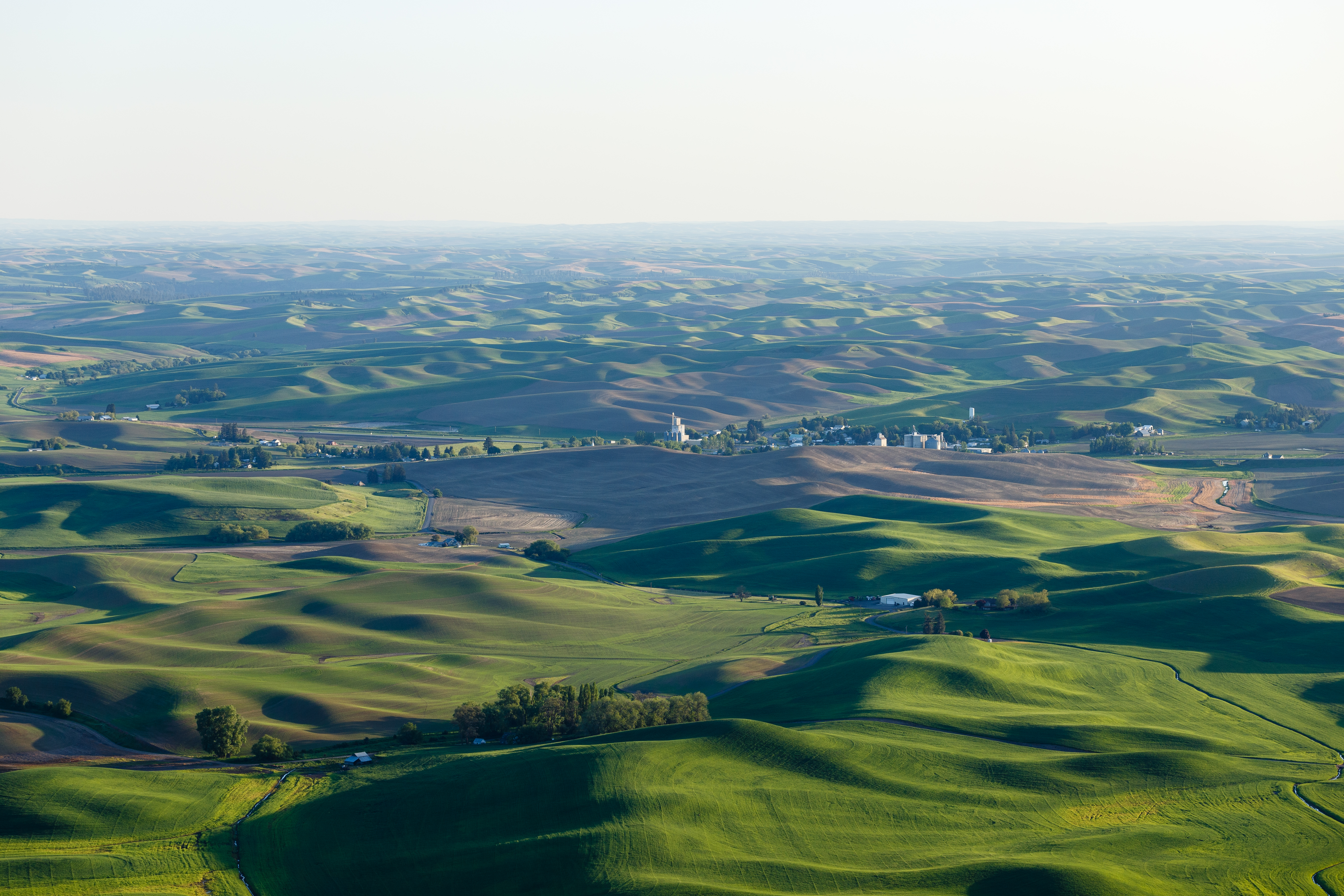
Steptoe Butte's summit provides scenic views of the Palouse farmland, seen here in the late spring.

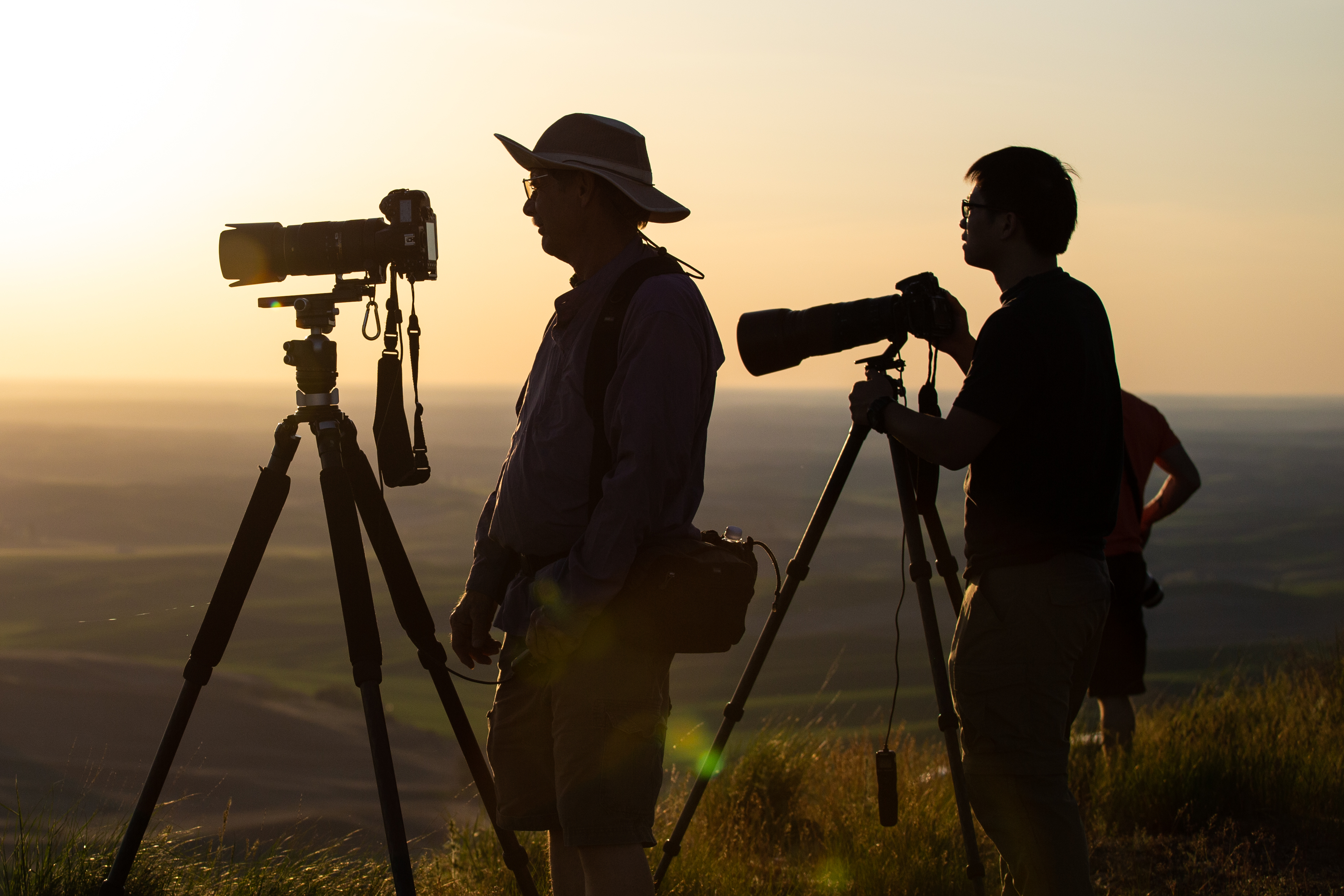
The butte's expansive views of the Palouse attracts photographers

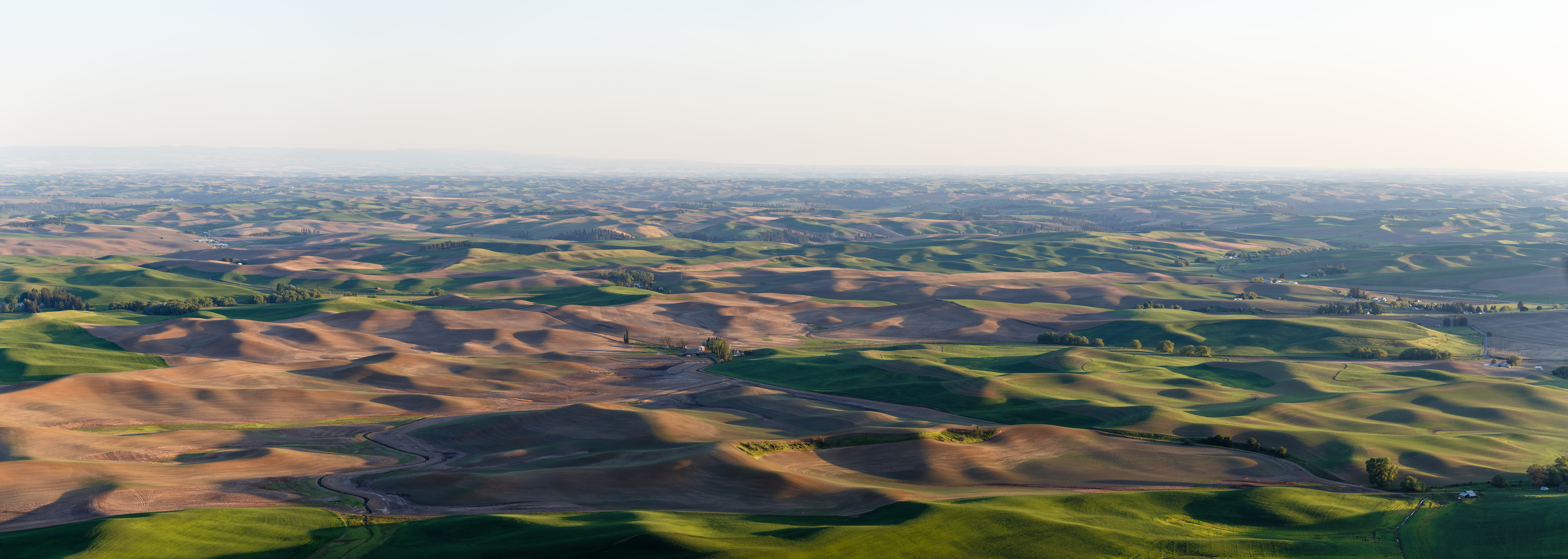
Panoramic view on a spring evening

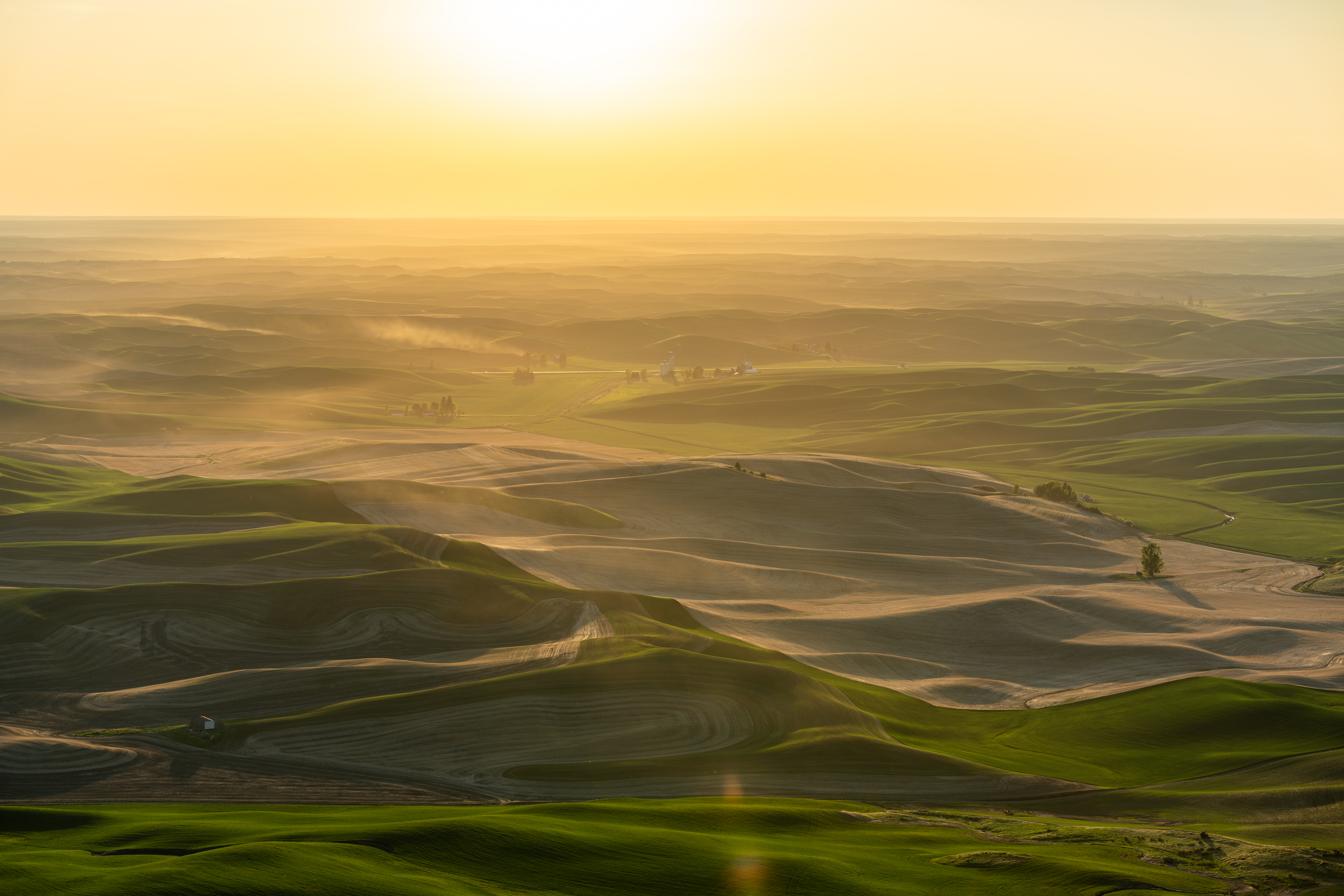
A hazy golden hour, looking west from the summit of the butte in May 2023

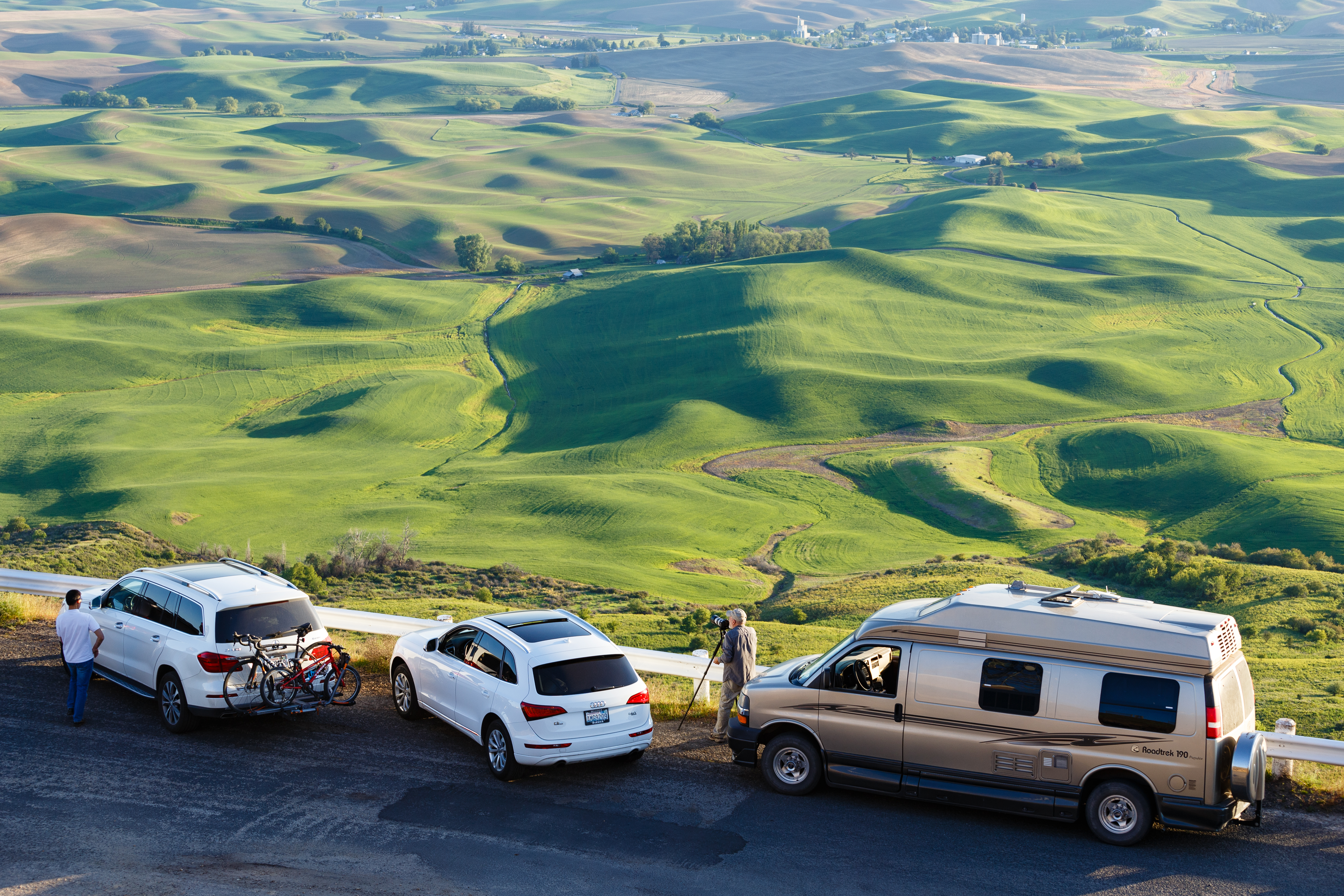
Tourists and photographers park alongside the access road
