= Palouse =

Geographic region of Northwestern United States dominated by wheat-based agriculture

- Region
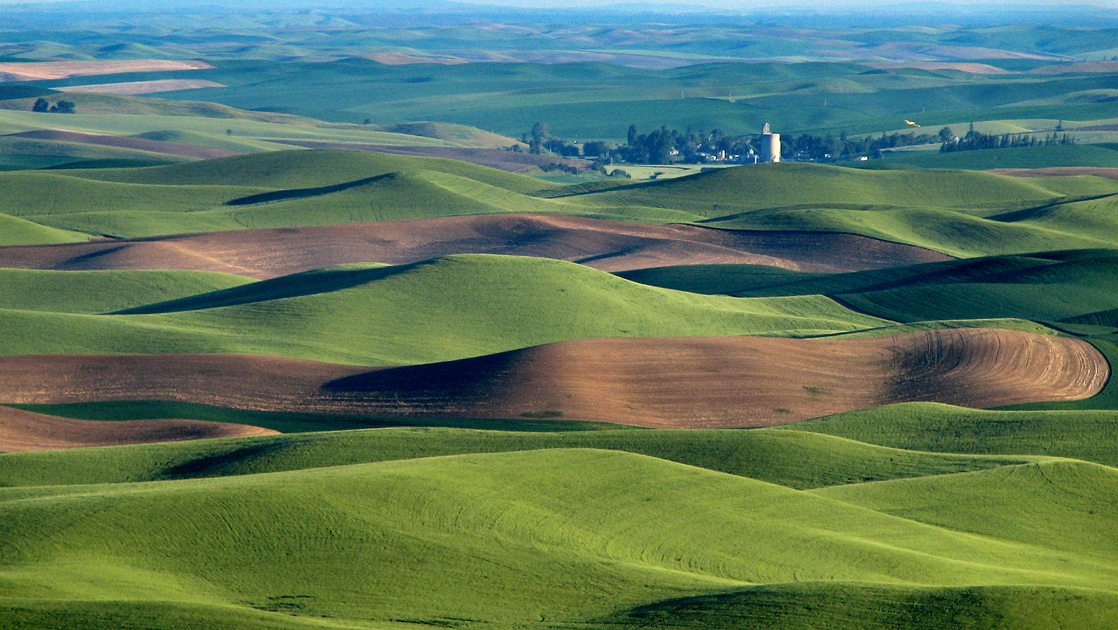
- The Palouse hills near Steptoe Butte

- Location within the United States
- Coordinates: 46.73°N 117.16°W

The Palouse (/pəˈluːs/ pə-LOOSS) is a geographic region of the northwestern United States, encompassing parts of north central Idaho, southeastern Washington (part of eastern Washington), and by some definitions, parts of northeast Oregon. It is a major agricultural area, primarily producing wheat and legumes. Situated about 160 miles (260 km) north of the Oregon Trail, the region experienced rapid growth in the late 19th century.

The Palouse is home to two land-grant universities: the University of Idaho in Moscow and Washington State University in Pullman. Just eight miles (13 km) apart, both universities opened in the early 1890s.

== Geography and history ==
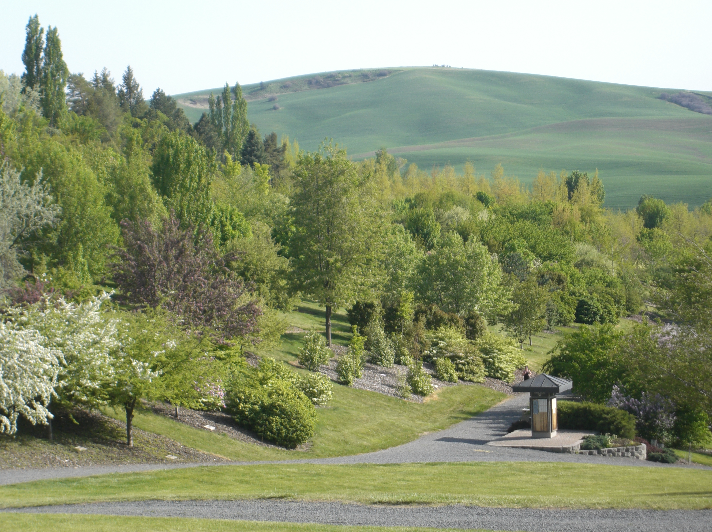
The Palouse hills south of the UI Arboretum in Moscow, Idaho

The origin of the name "Palouse" is unclear. One theory is that the name of the Palus tribe (spelled in early accounts variously as Palus, Palloatpallah, Pelusha, etc.) was converted by French-Canadian fur traders to the more familiar French word pelouse, meaning "land with short and thick grass" or "lawn". Over time, the spelling changed to Palouse. Another theory is that the region's name came from the French word and was later applied to its indigenous inhabitants.

Traditionally, the Palouse region was defined as the fertile hills and prairies north of the Snake River, which separated it from Walla Walla County, and north of the Clearwater River, which separated it from the Camas Prairie, extending north along the Washington and Idaho border, south of Spokane and centered on the Palouse River. The region had a settlement and wheat-growing boom during the 1880s, part of a larger process of growing wheat in southeast Washington, originally pioneered in Walla Walla County south of the Snake River. While this definition of the Palouse remains common today, the term is sometimes used to refer to the entire wheat-growing region, including Walla Walla County, the Camas Prairie of Idaho, the Big Bend region of the central Columbia River Plateau, and other smaller agricultural districts such as Asotin County, Washington, and Umatilla County, Oregon. This larger definition is used by organizations such as the World Wide Fund for Nature, who define the Palouse Grasslands ecoregion broadly.

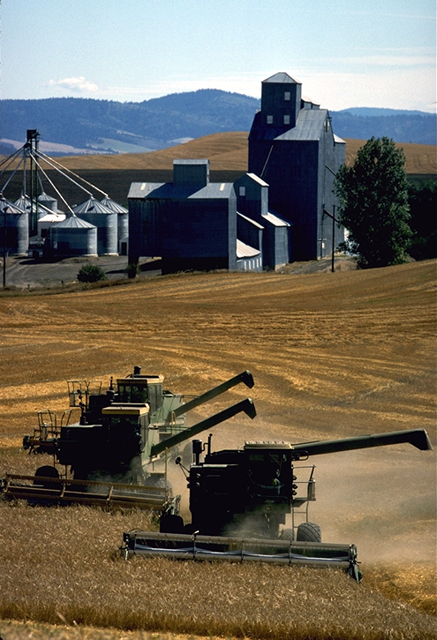
A farm in Whitman County

The community of Palouse, Washington, is located in Whitman County, about 7 miles (11 km) west of Potlatch, Idaho. Nevertheless, the traditional definition of the Palouse region is distinct from the older Walla Walla region south of the Snake River, where dryland farming of wheat was first proved to be viable in the region in the 1860s. During the 1870s, the Walla Walla region was rapidly converted to farmland, while the initial experiments in growing wheat began in the Palouse region, which previously had been the domain of cattle and sheep ranching. When those trials turned out to be more than successful, a minor land rush quickly filled the Palouse region with farmers during the 1880s. The simultaneous proliferation of railroads only increased the rapid settlement of the Palouse. By 1890 nearly all the Palouse lands had been taken up and converted to wheat farming.

At least four centers were established all within several miles of each other: Colfax (the oldest), Palouse, Pullman, and on the Idaho side, Moscow. The four centers, along with at least ten lesser ones, resulted in a diffuse pattern of rural centers.

Cities along the borders of the Palouse and by some definitions included within it, include Lewiston, Idaho, serving the Camas Prairie farmlands; Ritzville, serving the eastern edge of the Big Bend Country; and Spokane, the region's major urban hub. So dominant was Spokane's position that it became known as the capital of the Inland Empire, including all the wheat-producing regions, the local mining districts, and lumber-producing forests. Spokane also served as the region's main railroad and transportation hub. By 1910, although local terms including Palouse, Walla Walla Country, Big Bend, Umatilla County, and Camas Prairie continued to be common, many people of the region began to regard themselves as living in the Inland Empire, the Wheat Belt, the Columbia Basin, or Eastern Washington, Oregon, or North Idaho.

=== Farming ===
Early farming was extremely labor-intensive and relied heavily on human and horse-power. An organized harvesting/threshing team in the 1920s required 120 men and 320 mules and horses. Teams moved from farm to farm as the crops ripened. By this point, the combine had been invented and was in use, but few farmers had enough horses to pull such a machine, which required a crew of 40 horses and six men to operate on level ground.

Only when the Idaho Harvester Company in Moscow began to manufacture a smaller machine did combine harvesting become feasible. By 1930, 90% of all Palouse wheat was harvested using combines. The next step in mechanization was the development of the tractor. As with the combines, the first steam engine and gasoline-powered tractors were too heavy and awkward for use on the steep Palouse hills. The smaller, general use tractors introduced in the 1920s were only marginally used. As a result, by 1930, only 20% of Palouse farmers used tractors. Today, the Palouse region is the most important lentil-growing region in the U.S.

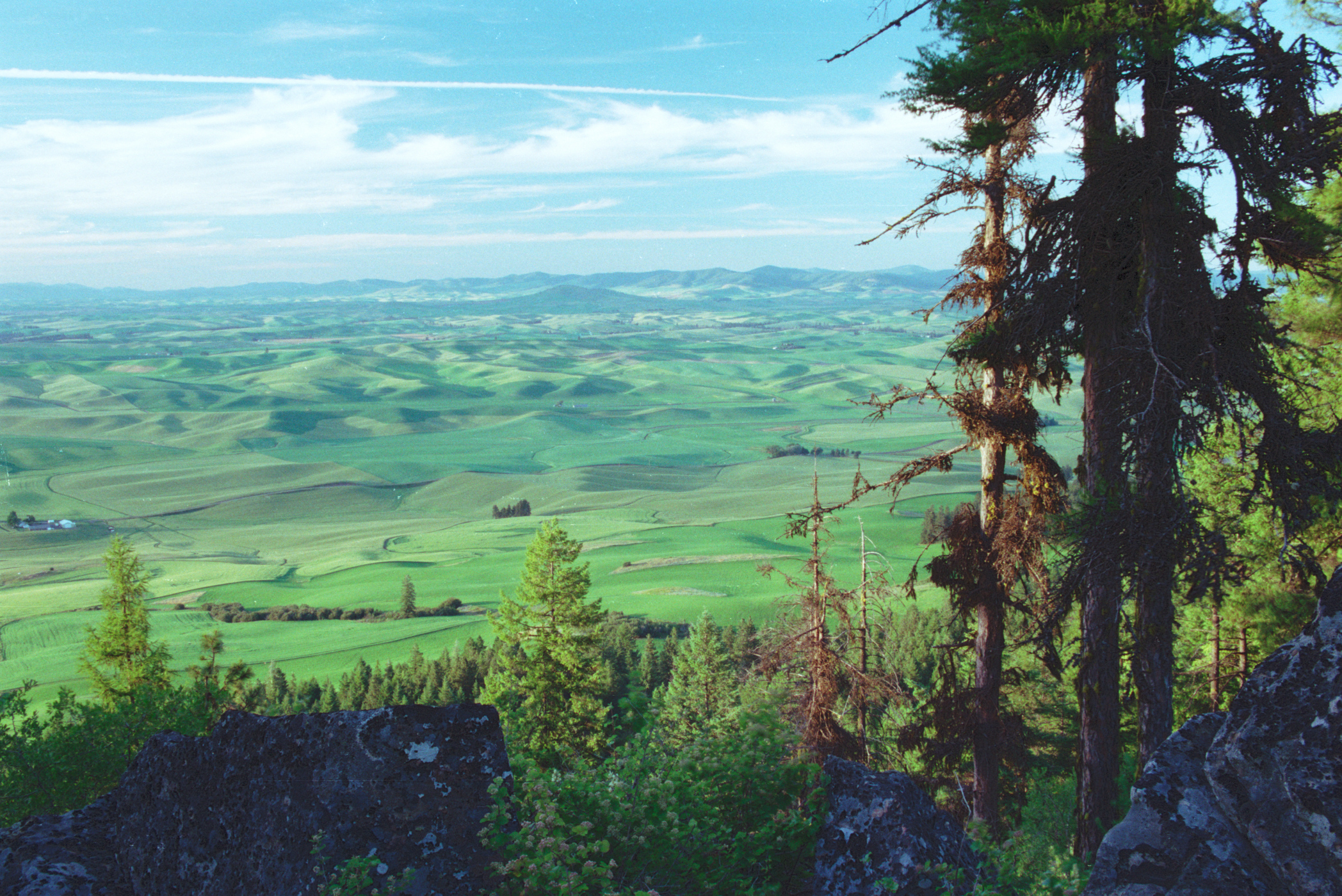
View of the Palouse fields from Kamiak Butte, early summer

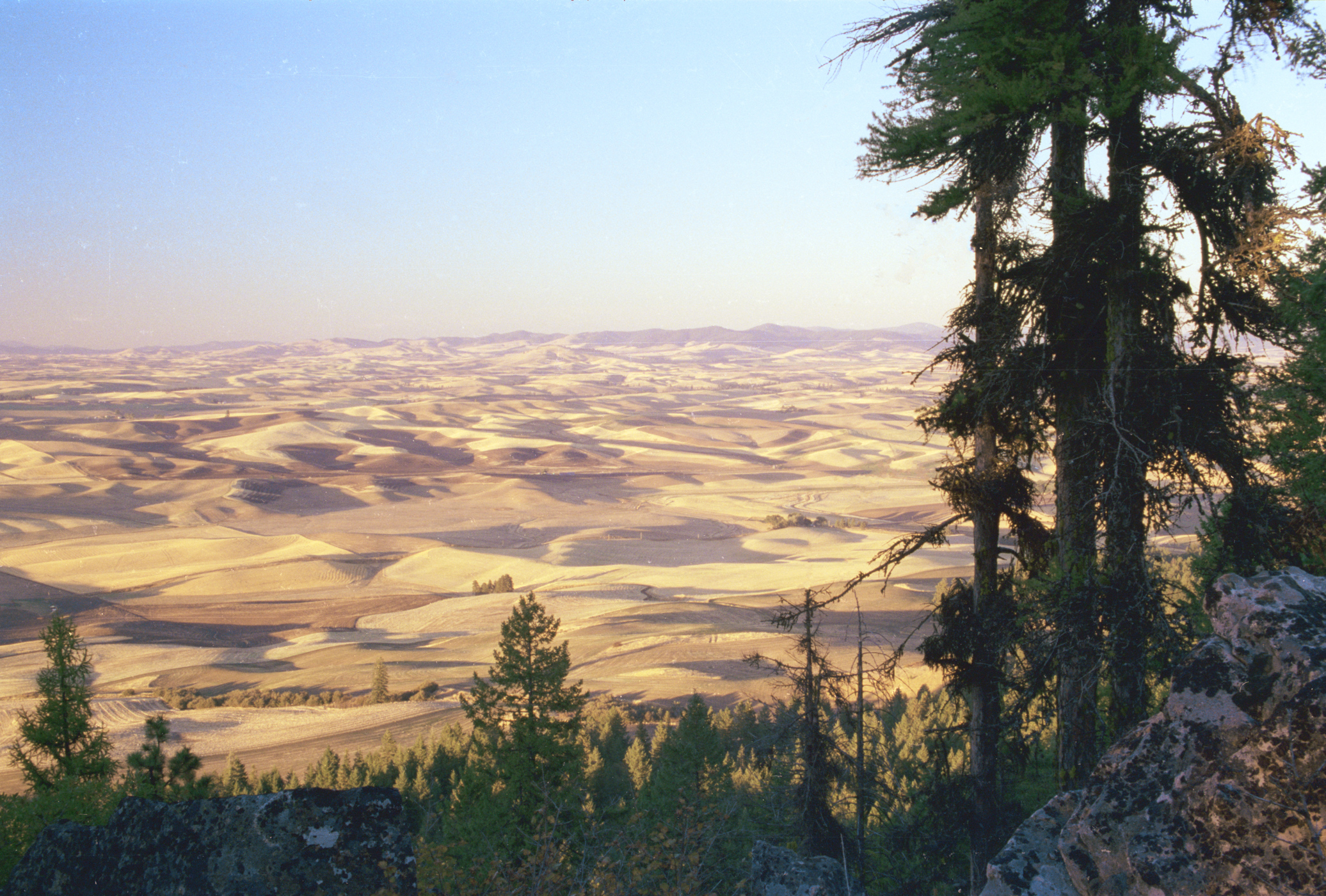
Palouse fields seen from Kamiak Butte, fall

== Geology ==
The peculiar and picturesque loess hills which characterize the Palouse Prairie are underlain by wind-blown sediments of the Palouse Loess which covers the surface of over 50,000 km^{2} (19,000 sq mi) on the Columbia Plateau in southeastern Washington, western Idaho, and northeastern Oregon. The Palouse Loess forms a fine-grained mantle of variable thickness which lies upon either the Miocene Columbia River Basalt Group, non-glacial Pliocene fluvial sediments of the Ringold Formation, or Pleistocene glacial outburst flood sediments which are known informally as the Hanford formation. At its thickest, the Palouse Loess is up to 75 meters (246 ft) thick. It consists of multiple layers of loess separated by multiple well-defined calcrete paleosols and erosional unconformities. The degree of development of individual layers of calcrete together with thermoluminescence and optically stimulated luminescence dating of the loess indicate that each calcrete layer represents a period of thousands to tens of thousands of years of nondeposition, weathering, and soil development that occurred between episodic periods of loess deposition. A consistent sequence of normal-reverse-normal polarity signatures demonstrates that the older layers of loess accumulated between 2 and 1 million years ago. Detailed optically stimulated luminescence dating has shown that the uppermost layer of Palouse Loess accumulated between 15,000 years ago and modern times and the layer of loess underlying it accumulated episodically between about 77,000 and 16,000 years ago. Regional trends in the distribution, thickness, texture, and overall composition of the Palouse Loess indicate that it largely consists of the wind-blown sediments eroded from fine-grained deposits of the Hanford formation that were periodically deposited by repeated Missoula floods within the Eureka Flats area.

Although superficially resembling sand or other types of dunes, the loess hills of the Palouse are of far different origin. Internally, they lack any evidence of cross-bedding or erosion of interbedded layers of loess and calcrete that characterize dunes formed by moving currents. Instead, these hills consist of alternating layers of loess and calcrete that are more or less concordant with the modern surface of these hills. This layering demonstrates that the Palouse hills loess accumulated from the airfall of wind-silt from suspension. In addition, the ubiquitous homogenization of the loess by innumerable plant roots and insect burrows as it accumulated further supports the conclusion drawn from numerous thermoluminescence and optically stimulated luminescence dates that individual layers of loess accumulated over an extended period of time in terms of thousands of years. Finally, the calcrete horizons are paleosols that represent the periodic cessation of loess accumulation for periods of thousands of years during which they formed within the surface of a loess layer.

== Environment ==
Palouse grasslands
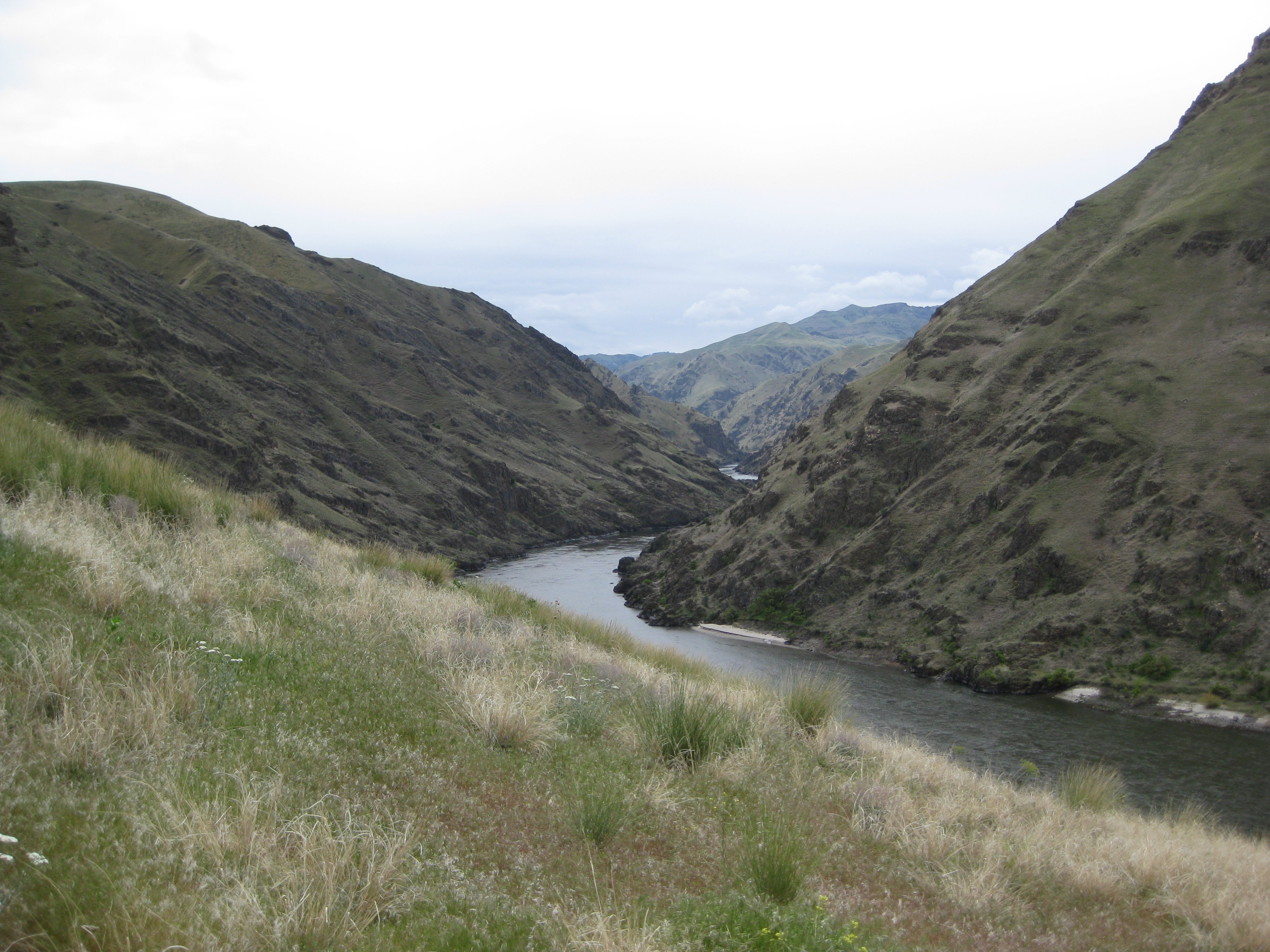
- A preserved patch of perennial grassland in Hells Canyon National Recreation Area in Idaho

Ecology
- Realm: Nearctic
- Biome: Temperate grasslands, savannas, and shrublands
- Borders: List: Blue Mountains forests; Cascade Mountains leeward forests; North Central Rockies forests; Okanagan dry forests; Snake-Columbia shrub steppe; South Central Rockies forests
- Bird species: 199
- Mammal species: 87

Geography
- Area: 46,879 km^{2} (18,100 mi^{2})
- Countries: United States
- States: Idaho; Oregon; Washington
- Climate type: Cold semi-arid (BSk)

Conservation
- Conservation status: Critical/Endangered
- Habitat loss: 26.3%
- Protected: 9.89%

Once an extensive prairie composed of mid-length perennial grasses such as bluebunch wheatgrass (Agropyron spicatum) and Idaho fescue (Festuca idahoensis), today virtually all of the Palouse Prairie has been plowed or overrun by non-native species such as cheatgrass. The native prairie is one of the most endangered ecosystems in the U.S., as only a little over one percent of the original prairie still exists. The only large preserved patches of this ecosystem left are found in Hells Canyon National Recreation Area and in the southern portion of Lake Roosevelt National Recreation Area in Washington.

Riparian areas offer breeding habitat for a greater diversity of birds than any other habitat in the U.S. Loss of trees and shrubs along stream corridors means fewer birds and eventually fewer species. The majority of riparian areas have been lost across the bioregion.

Lately, conversion of agricultural lands to suburban homesites on large plots invites a new suite of biodiversity onto the Palouse Prairie. University of Idaho wildlife professor J. Ratti documented changes in bird community composition over a 10-year period as he converted a wheat field into a suburban wildlife refuge. As of 1991, his 15-acre (61,000 m^{2}) yard attracted 86 species of birds, an increase from 18 (Ratti and Scott 1991).

=== Ecological transformation ===
As population grew, towns and cities appeared changing the complexion of the area. By 1910, there were 22,000 people scattered in 30 communities across the Palouse Prairie.

Intensification of agriculture has affected both water quantity and quality. Agriculture has changed the hydrology, increasing peak runoff flows and shortening the length of runoff. The result is more intense erosion and loss of perennial prairie streams. As early as the 1930s soil scientists were noting significant downcutting of regional rivers and expansion of channel width. Higher, faster runoff caused streams to downcut quickly, effectively lowering the water table in immediately adjacent meadows. On the South Palouse River, this process was so efficient that by 1900 farming was possible where it had been too wet previously. Replacement of perennial grasses with annual crops resulted in more overland flow and less infiltration, which translates at a watershed level to higher peak flows that subside more quickly than in the past. Once perennial prairie streams are now often dry by mid-summer. That has undoubtedly influenced the amphibious and aquatic species. Crop production increased dramatically (200–400%) after the introduction of fertilizer following World War II.

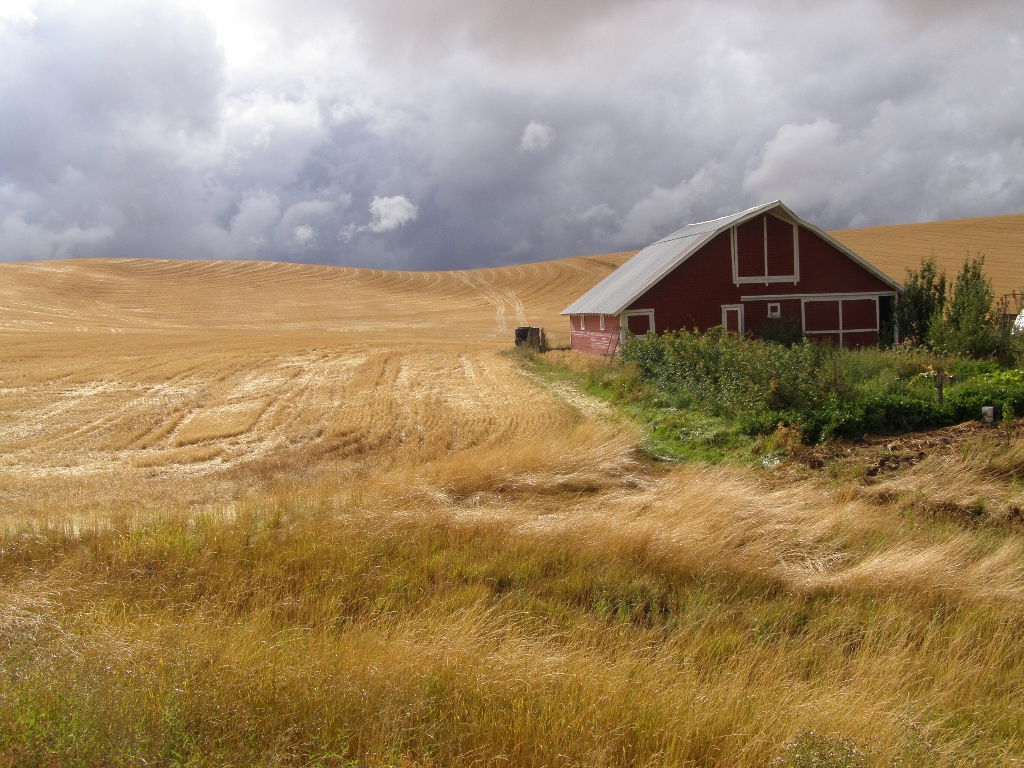
Farmland on the Palouse

Since 1900, 94% of the grasslands and 97% of the wetlands in the Palouse ecoregion have been converted to crop, hay, or pasture lands. Approximately 63% of the lands in forest cover in 1900 are still forested, 9% are grass, and 7% are regenerating forestlands or shrublands. The remaining 21% of previously forested lands have been converted to agriculture or urban areas.

The impacts of domestic grazers on the grasslands of the Palouse and Camas Prairies was transitory because much of the areas were rapidly converted to agriculture. However, the canyonlands of the Snake and Clearwater rivers and their tributaries with their much shallower soils, steep topography, and hotter, drier climate, were largely unsuitable for crop production and were consequently used for a much longer period by grazing domestic animals. There, intense grazing and other disturbances have resulted in irreversible changes with the native grasses largely replaced by annual grasses of the genus Bromus and noxious weeds, particularly from the genus Centaurea. The highly competitive plants of both of these genera evolved under similar climatic regimes in Eurasia and were introduced to the U.S. in the late 19th century.

With the adoption of no-till farming practices in the Palouse region in the early 2000s, the negative environmental impact of agriculture has visibly decreased.

=== Fauna ===
Some animals in the region include both mule and white-tailed deer, coyotes, bobcats, California quails, yellow-bellied marmots, and red-tailed hawks.

== Fires ==
While there is some debate over how frequently the Palouse prairie burned historically, there is consensus that fires are generally less frequent today than in the past, primarily due to fire suppression, construction of roads (which serve as barriers to fire spread) and conversion of grass and forests to cropland. Historians recount lightning-ignited fires burning in the pine fringes bordering the prairies in late autumn, but the extent to which forest fires spread into the prairie or the converse is not known. Some fire ecologists believe the Nez Perce burned the Palouse and Camas Prairies to encourage growth of camas; but there is little historical record of it. European-American settlers used fire to clear land for settlement and grazing until the 1930s. Since then, forest fires have become less common. One result has been increasing tree density on forested lands and encroachment of shrubs and trees into previously open areas.

== See also ==
- Appaloosa
- Battle of the Palouse - college football rivalry game
- Coeur d'Alene War
- Okanagan Desert
- Palouse Falls
- Steptoe Butte

== Bibliography ==
- Chapter 10: Additional Figures - Biodiversity and Land-use History of the Palouse Bioregion: Pre-European to Present - Sisk, T.D., editor. 1998. Perspectives on the land-use history of North America: a context for understanding our changing environment. U.S. Geological Survey, Biological Resources Division, Biological Science Report USGS/BRD/BSR 1998-0003 (Revised September 1999)..
- Meinig, D.W. 1968. The Great Columbia Plains: A Historical Geography, 1805-1910. University of Seattle Press, Seattle (Revised 1995). ISBN 0-295-97485-0.
- Morgan, P., S.C. Bunting, A.E. Black, T. Merrill, and S. Barrett. 1996. Fire regimes in the Interior Columbia River Basin: past and present. Final Report, RJVA-INT-94913. Intermountain Fire Sciences Laboratory, USDA Forest Service, Intermountain Research Station, Missoula, Mont.
- Ratti, J.T., and J.M. Scott. 1991. Agricultural impacts on wildlife: problem review and restoration needs. The Environmental Professional 13:263-274.
- Tisdale, E.W. 1986. Canyon grasslands and associated shrublands of west-central Idaho and adjacent areas. Bulletin No. 40. Forestry, Wildlife and Range Experiment Station, University of Idaho, Moscow.
- Victor, E. 1935. Some effects of cultivation upon stream history and upon the topography of the Palouse region. Northwest Science 9(3):18-19.
