= National Register of Historic Places listings in Oneida County, Idaho =

Location of Oneida County in Idaho

This is a list of the National Register of Historic Places listings in Oneida County, Idaho.

This is intended to be a complete list of the properties and districts on the National Register of Historic Places in Oneida County, Idaho, United States. Latitude and longitude coordinates are provided for many National Register properties and districts; these locations may be seen together in a map.

There are 8 properties and districts listed on the National Register in the county. More may be added; properties and districts nationwide are added to the Register weekly.

This National Park Service list is complete through NPS recent listings posted September 25, 2026.

== Current listings ==
| | Name on the Register | Image | Date listed | Location | City or town | Description |
|---|---|---|---|---|---|---|
| 1 | American Legion Malad Post 65 | | January 25, 2024 (#100009874) | 78 N. Main St. 42°11′14″N 112°14′43″W | Malad City | |
| 2 | Co-Op Block and J. N. Ireland Bank | Co-Op Block and J. N. Ireland Bank | April 18, 1979 (#79000804) | Main and Bannock Sts. 42°11′11″N 112°14′42″W | Malad City | |
| 3 | D.L. Evans Sr. Bungalow | D.L. Evans Sr. Bungalow | August 30, 1979 (#79000805) | 203 N. Main St. 42°11′24″N 112°14′41″W | Malad City | |
| 4 | Jedd Jones House | Jedd Jones House | May 1, 1979 (#79000806) | 242 N. Main St. 42°11′27″N 112°14′38″W | Malad City | |
| 5 | Malad Second Ward Tabernacle | Malad Second Ward Tabernacle | July 27, 1979 (#79000803) | 20 S. 100 W. St. 42°11′07″N 112°14′53″W | Malad City | A meetinghouse near the center of Malad City, constructed in 1915, significant for its large scale and unique architecture. |
| 6 | Oneida County Courthouse | Oneida County Courthouse | November 27, 1987 (#87001588) | 10 E. Court St. 42°11′12″N 112°14′35″W | Malad City | |
| 7 | Samaria Historic District | Samaria Historic District | June 11, 1979 (#79003740) | Roughly bounded by Main and 3rd Sts., 1st Ave., N., and the southern end of 2nd St. 42°06′46″N 112°20′04″W | Samaria | |
| 8 | United Presbyterian Church | United Presbyterian Church | October 16, 1979 (#79000807) | 7 S. Main St. 42°11′11″N 112°14′34″W | Malad City | A place of worship in central Malad significant for its historical contribution to the Presbyterian community in Oneida County and as one of the few surviving examples of the once common red-brick architecture in Malad City. |

== See also ==
- List of National Historic Landmarks in Idaho
- National Register of Historic Places listings in Idaho
