= Oneida County, Idaho =

County in Idaho, United States

- County
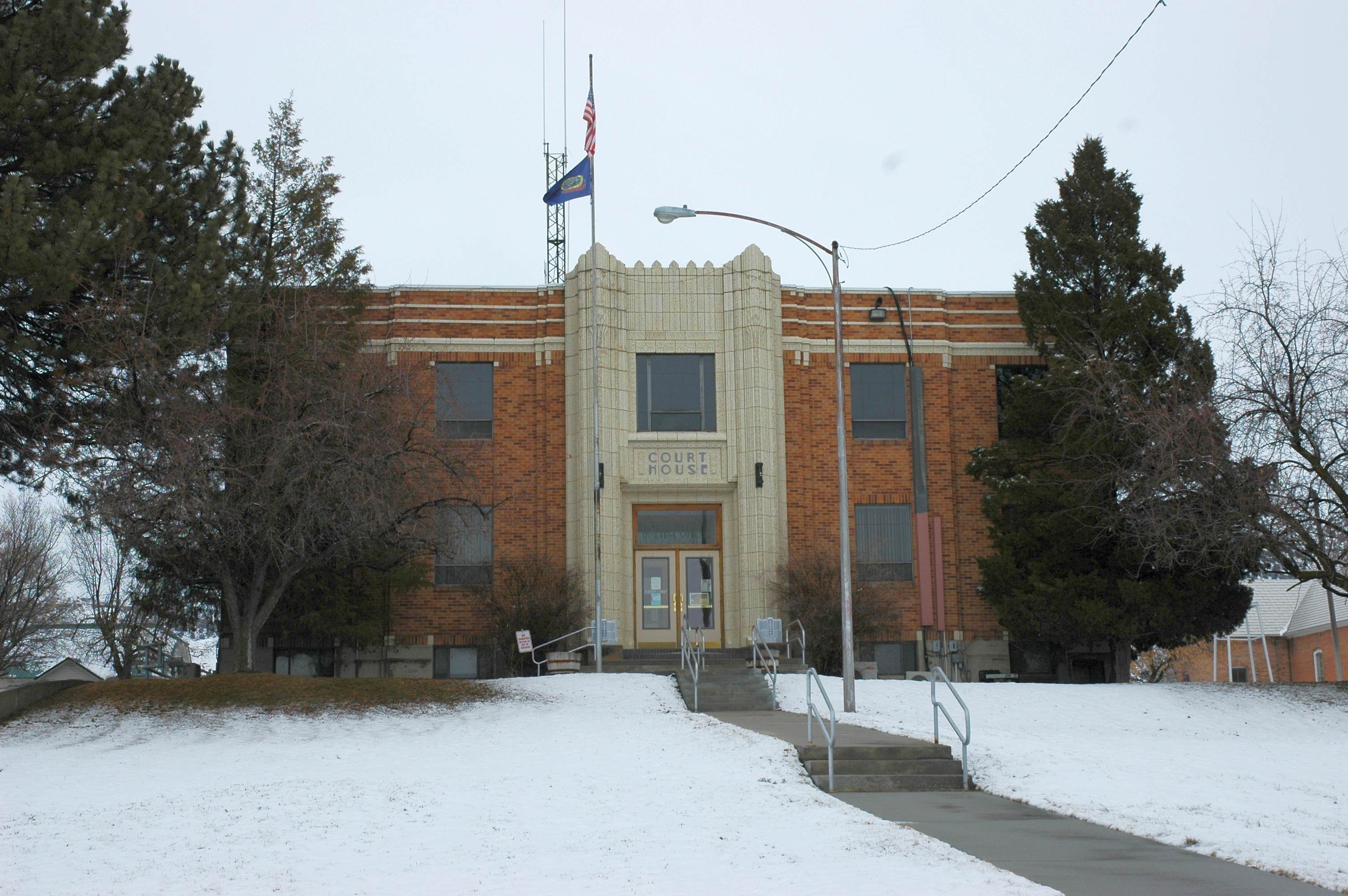
- Oneida County Courthouse in Malad City

- Seal

- Location within the U.S. state of Idaho
- Coordinates: 42°13′N 112°31′W
- Country: United States
- State: Idaho
- Founded: January 22, 1864
- Named for: Oneida Lake, New York
- Seat: Malad City
- Largest city: Malad City

Area
  - Total: 1,202 sq mi (3,110 km^{2})
  - Land: 1,200 sq mi (3,100 km^{2})
  - Water: 1.5 sq mi (3.9 km^{2}) 0.1%

Population (2020)
  - Total: 4,564
  - Estimate (2025): 5,085 ▲
  - Density: 3.8/sq mi (1.5/km^{2})
- Time zone: UTC−7 (Mountain)
  - Summer (DST): UTC−6 (MDT)
- Congressional district: 2nd
- Website: oneidaid.us

Oneida County is a county located in the U.S. state of Idaho. As of the 2020 Census the county had a population of 4,564. The county seat and largest city is Malad City. Most of the county's population lives in Malad City and the surrounding Malad Valley.

== History ==
The county is named for Oneida Lake, New York, the area from which most of the early settlers had emigrated.

Oneida County was organized on January 22, 1864, with its county seat established at Soda Springs in present-day Caribou County. The county seat was moved to Malad City in 1866 because of its population growth and location on the freight road and stagecoach line between Corinne, Utah, and the mines in Butte, Montana.

Early in its lengthy history, Oneida County had the distinction of being Idaho's largest county by both area and population. Its initial size was 32,708 mi^{2} making it the third largest of the 17 counties created by the first legislature of Idaho Territory in 1863 and early 1864. When the US Congress created Montana Territory on May 26, 1864, it also transferred a portion of Oneida County over to Dakota Territory. Even with the loss of territory, the act left Oneida County as Idaho's largest remaining Idaho county at 20,621 mi^{2}. Alturas County exchanged territory with Boise County in 1866 to increase its land area above that of Oneida County. Oneida County lost significant territory to Wyoming Territory in 1868, to the creation of Bear Lake County in 1875, and to the creation of Cassia County in 1879. Minor adjustments to boundaries occurred in 1871, 1875, and 1877. Creation of Bingham County in 1885 left Oneida County with only 2,633 mi^{2}, while creation of Franklin and Power Counties further reduced the county's area to 1,219 mi^{2} in 1913. Minor changes to boundaries occurred in 1917 and 1927 that gave Oneida County its present land area.

Early loss of territory had no impact on population growth of the county as some areas lost had almost no population or were offset by heavy migration of Mormons occurring along Idaho's southern border. Oneida County was officially Idaho Territory's 3rd most populous behind Boise and Ada counties at Idaho Territory's first decennial census in 1870. However, the county's actual population was severely undercounted as a result of its lack of a surveyed southern boundary. The survey of Idaho's southern border by 1872 revealed that the 1870 Census had erroneously assigned eight Idaho settlements in the Bear Lake Valley to Rich County, Utah and five Idaho settlements in the Cache Valley to Cache County, Utah. Had the settlements been accurately assigned to Oneida County in 1870, the county would have been Idaho's largest with 4,647 residents. Oneida County would go on to officially become Idaho's most populous county at the 1880 Census with 6,964 residents even after it had lost populated territory to creation of Bear Lake and Cassia Counties. The loss of large population centers achieved through the creation of Bingham County resulted in the county's first decline in population at the 1890 Census. While diminished in significance, the county was still one of the State's more prominent counties at that time. Oneida County did retain developing population centers at Malad City, American Falls, and Preston. Their growth led to a peak in the county's population at the 1910 Census. The county lost much of its prominence with the creation of Franklin and Power Counties in 1913. The loss in territory again caused a population decline while Malad City and even outlying areas experienced growth through the 1920 Census. After the 1920 Census, Oneida County experienced fifty years of population decline, losing more than half of its 1920 population by the 1970 Census. The county has regained less than 40% of its lost population as of the 2016 Census estimate.

== Geography ==
According to the U.S. Census Bureau, the county has a total area of 1,202 square miles (3,110 km^{2}), of which 1,200 square miles (3,100 km^{2}) is land and 1.5 square miles (3.9 km^{2}) (0.1%) is water.

Oxford Peak is the highest point in the county at 9,285 ft (2,830 m) above sea level. Alternating valleys and ridges of mountains or hills typify the topography, with grassland and sagebrush covering most areas. The Curlew National Grassland lies within the county.

=== Adjacent counties ===
- Power County – north
- Bannock County – northeast
- Franklin County – east
- Cache County, Utah – southeast
- Box Elder County, Utah – south
- Cassia County – west

=== Major highways ===
- Interstate 15
- Interstate 84
- SH-36
- SH-38

=== National protected areas ===
- Caribou National Forest (part)
- Curlew National Grassland (part)
- Sawtooth National Forest (part)

== Demographics ==
Historical population
Census	Pop.	Note	%±
1870	1,922		—
1880	6,964		262.3%
1890	6,819		−2.1%
1900	8,933		31.0%
1910	15,170		69.8%
1920	6,723		−55.7%
1930	5,870		−12.7%
1940	5,417		−7.7%
1950	4,387		−19.0%
1960	3,603		−17.9%
1970	2,864		−20.5%
1980	3,258		13.8%
1990	3,492		7.2%
2000	4,125		18.1%
2010	4,286		3.9%
2020	4,564		6.5%
2025 (est.)	5,085	▲	11.4%
U.S. Decennial Census; 1790–1960 1900–1990; 1990–2000 2010, 2020

=== Racial and ethnic composition ===
Oneida County, Idaho – Racial and ethnic composition Note: the US Census treats Hispanic/Latino as an ethnic category. This table excludes Latinos from the racial categories and assigns them to a separate category. Hispanics/Latinos may be of any race.
Race / Ethnicity (NH = Non-Hispanic)	Pop 1980	Pop 1990	Pop 2000	Pop 2010	Pop 2020	% 1980	% 1990	% 2000	% 2010	% 2020
White alone (NH)	3,206	3,407	3,986	4,073	4,259	98.40%	97.57%	96.63%	95.03%	93.32%
Black or African American alone (NH)	0	4	5	9	2	0.00%	0.11%	0.12%	0.21%	0.04%
Native American or Alaska Native alone (NH)	8	17	11	21	14	0.25%	0.49%	0.27%	0.49%	0.31%
Asian alone (NH)	4	8	6	20	14	0.12%	0.23%	0.15%	0.47%	0.31%
Native Hawaiian or Pacific Islander alone (NH)	x	x	3	1	4	x	x	0.07%	0.02%	0.09%
Other race alone (NH)	5	0	0	1	8	0.15%	0.00%	0.00%	0.02%	0.18%
Mixed race or Multiracial (NH)	x	x	19	35	85	x	x	0.46%	0.82%	1.86%
Hispanic or Latino (any race)	35	56	95	126	178	1.07%	1.60%	2.30%	2.94%	3.90%
Total	3,258	3,492	4,125	4,286	4,564	100.00%	100.00%	100.00%	100.00%	100.00%

=== 2020 census ===
As of the 2020 census, the county had a population of 4,564. The median age was 40.3 years. 28.3% of residents were under the age of 18 and 20.2% of residents were 65 years of age or older. For every 100 females there were 101.1 males, and for every 100 females age 18 and over there were 100.2 males.

The racial makeup of the county was 94.5% White, 0.1% Black or African American, 0.4% American Indian and Alaska Native, 0.4% Asian, 0.1% Native Hawaiian and Pacific Islander, 1.1% from some other race, and 3.6% from two or more races. Hispanic or Latino residents of any race comprised 3.9% of the population. The most reported ancestries were English (40%), Welsh (11.6%), German (10.3%), Irish (7.1%), Danish (4.6%), and Scottish (4%).

0.0% of residents lived in urban areas, while 100.0% lived in rural areas.

There were 1,694 households in the county, of which 33.3% had children under the age of 18 living with them and 18.5% had a female householder with no spouse or partner present. About 25.2% of all households were made up of individuals and 13.1% had someone living alone who was 65 years of age or older.

There were 2,009 housing units, of which 15.7% were vacant. Among occupied housing units, 82.0% were owner-occupied and 18.0% were renter-occupied. The homeowner vacancy rate was 1.5% and the rental vacancy rate was 9.7%.

=== 2010 census ===
As of the 2010 United States census, there were 4,286 people, 1,545 households, and 1,161 families living in the county. The population density was 3.6 inhabitants per square mile (1.4/km^{2}). There were 1,906 housing units at an average density of 1.6 units per square mile (0.62 units/km^{2}). The racial makeup of the county was 96.7% white, 0.5% Asian, 0.5% American Indian, 0.2% black or African American, 1.1% from other races, and 1.0% from two or more races. Those of Hispanic or Latino origin made up 2.9% of the population. In terms of ancestry, 38.3% were English, 15.1% were Welsh, 12.8% were "American", 10.7% were German, 5.8% were Swedish, and 5.1% were Danish.

Of the 1,545 households, 36.4% had children under the age of 18 living with them, 65.9% were married couples living together, 6.1% had a female householder with no husband present, 24.9% were non-families, and 22.5% of all households were made up of individuals. The average household size was 2.74 and the average family size was 3.24. The median age was 39.1 years.

The median income for a household in the county was $44,599 and the median income for a family was $51,371. Males had a median income of $43,362 versus $24,821 for females. The per capita income for the county was $17,950. About 11.9% of families and 13.4% of the population were below the poverty line, including 14.2% of those under age 18 and 13.0% of those age 65 or over.

=== 2000 census ===
As of the census of 2000, there were 4,125 people, 1,430 households, and 1,092 families living in the county. The population density was 3 people per square mile (1.2 people/km^{2}). There were 1,755 housing units at an average density of 2 units per square mile (0.77 units/km^{2}). The racial makeup of the county was 97.50% White, 0.12% Black or African American, 0.32% Native American, 0.15% Asian, 0.07% Pacific Islander, 1.36% from other races, and 0.48% from two or more races. 2.30% of the population were Hispanic or Latino of any race. 27.2% were of English, 20.0% Welsh, 12.0% "American", 7.1% German, and 6.8% Danish ancestry.

There were 1,430 households, out of which 38.40% had children under the age of 18 living with them, 68.50% were married couples living together, 4.50% had a female householder with no husband present, and 23.60% were non-families. 22.50% of all households were made up of individuals, and 11.90% had someone living alone who was 65 years of age or older. The average household size was 2.85 and the average family size was 3.35.

In the county, the population was spread out, with 32.00% under the age of 18, 7.70% from 18 to 24, 23.10% from 25 to 44, 21.40% from 45 to 64, and 15.90% who were 65 years of age or older. The median age was 36 years. For every 100 females there were 103.10 males. For every 100 females age 18 and over, there were 100.40 males.

The median income for a household in the county was $34,309, and the median income for a family was $38,341. Males had a median income of $29,730 versus $19,808 for females. The per capita income for the county was $13,829. About 6.70% of families and 10.80% of the population were below the poverty line, including 13.00% of those under age 18 and 10.80% of those age 65 or over.

== Arts and culture ==
=== Museums and other points of interest ===
Oneida County contains seven buildings listed on the National Register of Historic Places:

- The Co-Op Block and J. N. Ireland Bank, in Malad City
- The D.L. Evans, Sr. Bungalow, in Malad City
- The Jedd Jones House, in Malad City
- The Malad Second Ward Tabernacle, in Malad City
- The Oneida County Courthouse, in Malad City
- The Samaria Historic District, in Samaria
- The United Presbyterian Church, in Malad City

== Notable people ==
- John V. Evans (1925–2014), Governor of Idaho (1977–87); born in Malad City
- William Marion Jardine (1879–1955), U.S. Secretary of Agriculture (1925–29) and the U.S. Ambassador to Egypt; born in Oneida County.

== Communities ==
=== City ===
- Malad City

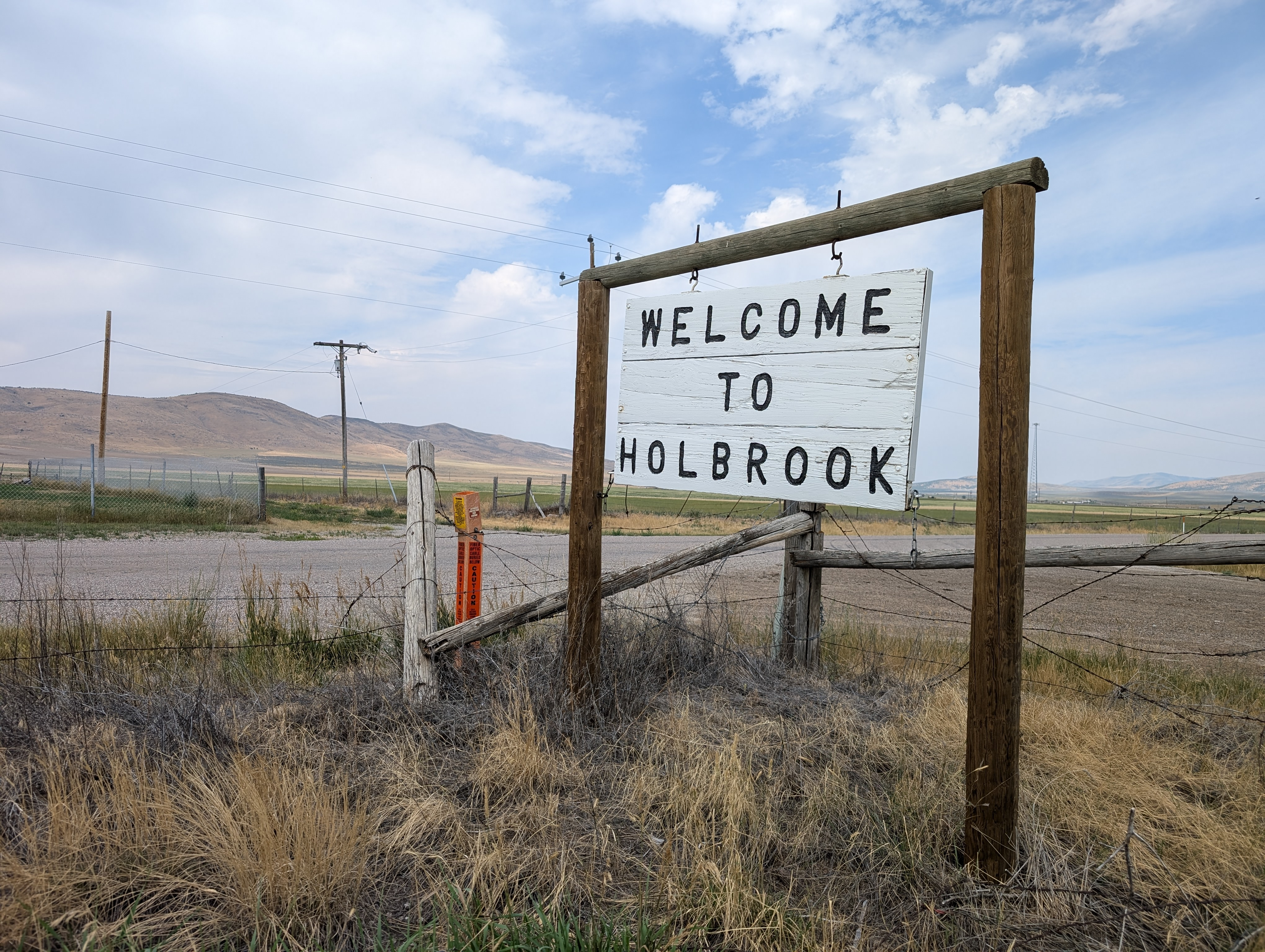
Welcome Sign Entering Holbrook

=== Unincorporated communities ===
- Cherry Creek
- Holbrook
- Pleasantview
- Samaria
- Stone
- Woodruff
- Saint John’s
- Daniels

== Politics ==
Like all of conservative, Mormon southeastern Idaho, Oneida County is overwhelmingly Republican. The last Democratic presidential candidate to carry the county was Harry S. Truman in 1948, and Jimmy Carter in 1976 was the last Democrat to crack thirty percent in the county.

United States presidential election results for Oneida County, Idaho
Year	Republican		Democratic		Third party(ies)	
Year	No.	%	No.	%	No.	%
1892	267	63.88%	0	0.00%	151	36.12%
1896	315	22.28%	1,092	77.23%	7	0.50%
1900	1,891	60.75%	1,222	39.25%	0	0.00%
1904	2,839	74.32%	906	23.72%	75	1.96%
1908	2,595	61.54%	1,512	35.85%	110	2.61%
1912	2,373	60.41%	1,386	35.29%	169	4.30%
1916	1,014	43.28%	1,298	55.40%	31	1.32%
1920	1,500	66.61%	752	33.39%	0	0.00%
1924	956	42.81%	530	23.73%	747	33.45%
1928	1,184	53.55%	1,020	46.13%	7	0.32%
1932	1,047	41.65%	1,449	57.64%	18	0.72%
1936	955	36.20%	1,673	63.42%	10	0.38%
1940	1,140	44.12%	1,440	55.73%	4	0.15%
1944	935	43.23%	1,227	56.73%	1	0.05%
1948	962	48.54%	1,008	50.86%	12	0.61%
1952	1,547	67.64%	739	32.31%	1	0.04%
1956	1,324	64.21%	738	35.79%	0	0.00%
1960	1,111	58.17%	799	41.83%	0	0.00%
1964	1,111	59.13%	768	40.87%	0	0.00%
1968	1,114	66.15%	465	27.61%	105	6.24%
1972	1,204	71.45%	402	23.86%	79	4.69%
1976	1,065	61.14%	637	36.57%	40	2.30%
1980	1,461	74.16%	434	22.03%	75	3.81%
1984	1,528	80.51%	360	18.97%	10	0.53%
1988	1,269	70.11%	508	28.07%	33	1.82%
1992	713	38.21%	351	18.81%	802	42.98%
1996	993	57.53%	429	24.86%	304	17.61%
2000	1,426	79.31%	307	17.07%	65	3.62%
2004	1,789	83.87%	304	14.25%	40	1.88%
2008	1,724	79.74%	381	17.62%	57	2.64%
2012	1,838	87.98%	217	10.39%	34	1.63%
2016	1,531	74.03%	184	8.90%	353	17.07%
2020	2,148	87.60%	249	10.15%	55	2.24%
2024	2,119	86.24%	253	10.30%	85	3.46%

== Education ==
The vast majority of the county is in the Oneida County School District 351, while a small portion is in the Cassia County Joint School District 151.

== See also ==
- National Register of Historic Places listings in Oneida County, Idaho
