= Sundberg & Sundberg =

American architect

Sundberg & Sundberg was an architectural firm based in Idaho Falls, Idaho. The firm designed numerous public buildings, including several county courthouses. Several of its works are listed on the National Register of Historic Places for their architecture.

C.A. Sundberg was an architect of Rexburg, Idaho, when he designed the Power County Courthouse, built in 1925. He later moved his practice to Idaho Falls.

It was written of the 1920 Madison County courthouse that it, "Like most of Idaho's county courthouses", is "the most ambitious and stylistically elaborate architectural design in its locality and its region". Three courthouses, for Jefferson, Jerome, and Oneida counties, were designed for Works Project Administration-funded construction during 1938–39, and are nearly identical.

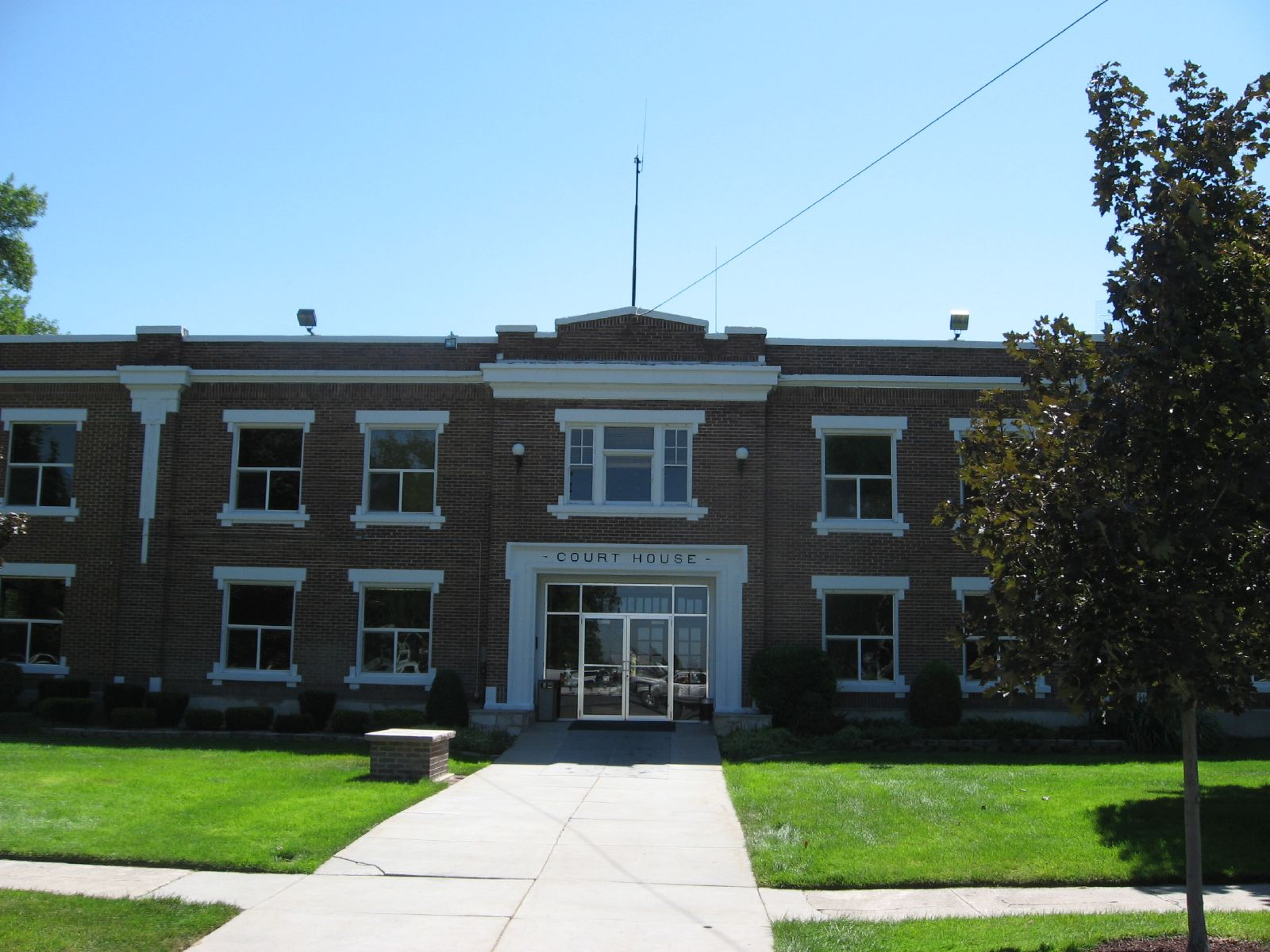
Power County Courthouse

Works by the firm or C.A. Sundberg include (with attribution):

- 1920 - Madison County Courthouse, E. Main St. Rexburg, Idaho (Sundberg, C.A.), NRHP-listed
- 1924 - Teton County Courthouse, Main St. Driggs, Idaho (Sundberg, C.A.), NRHP-listed
- 1925 - Power County Courthouse, Bannock Ave. American Falls, Idaho (Sundberg, C.A.), NRHP-listed
- 1937 - 5th Ward Meeting House, of the L.D.S. church, Idaho Falls, Idaho, (Sundberg & Sundberg)
- 1938 - Jefferson County Courthouse, 134 N. Clark Rigby, Idaho (Sundberg & Sundberg), NRHP-listed. Demolished.
- 1938 - Jerome County Courthouse, N. Lincoln Jerome, Idaho (Sundberg & Sundberg), NRHP-listed
- 1939 - Oneida County Courthouse, Court St. Malad, Idaho (Sundberg & Sundberg), NRHP-listed
- One or more works in Ridge Avenue Historic District, roughly bounded by N. Eastern Ave., Birch St., S. Blvd., Ash St., W. Placer Ave. and Pine St. Idaho Falls, Idaho (Sundberg and Sundberg), NRHP-listed

Other Sundberg architects:

- Keith Covington Sundberg owned and operated Sundberg and Associates, architects in Idaho Falls, until retiring in 1981.
- Alvin Frithiof Sundberg may be associated with the firm?

== See also ==
- Pleasant Grove Town Hall, 107 S. 100 East Pleasant Grove, Utah (Sundberg, Andrew F.), NRHP-listed
