= Jefferson County Courthouse (Idaho) =

Historic building in Idaho

- U.S. National Register of Historic Places
- Location within Idaho Location within the United States
- Location: 134 N. Clark, Rigby, Idaho
- Coordinates: 43°40′24″N 111°54′38″W
- Area: less than one acre
- Built: 1938
- Architectural style: Art Deco
- MPS: County Courthouses in Idaho MPS
- NRHP reference No.: 87001586
- Added to NRHP: September 27, 1987

The Jefferson County Courthouse was a building located in Rigby, Idaho listed on the National Register of Historic Places.

It was one of three nearly identical courthouses designed by Sundberg & Sundberg for 1938 Works Progress Administration projects, the other two being the Jerome County Courthouse and the Oneida County Courthouse. All are two-story buildings with five-bay fronts and have elaborate terra cotta entries.

The building was demolished March 15, 2016.

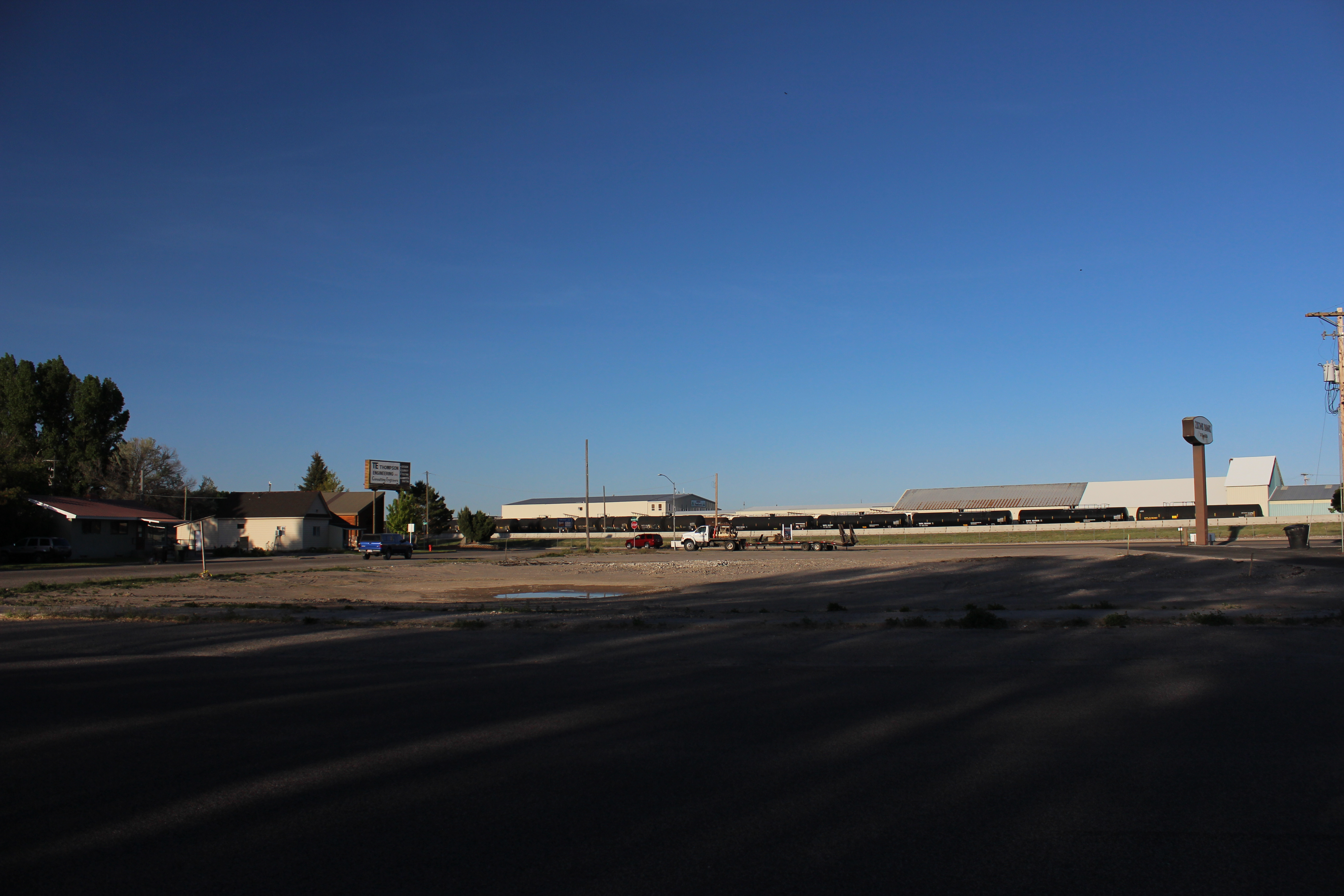
Site of the former courthouse

== See also ==
- List of National Historic Landmarks in Idaho
- National Register of Historic Places listings in Jefferson County, Idaho
