= Malad Second Ward Tabernacle =

Historic church in Idaho, United States

- U.S. National Register of Historic Places
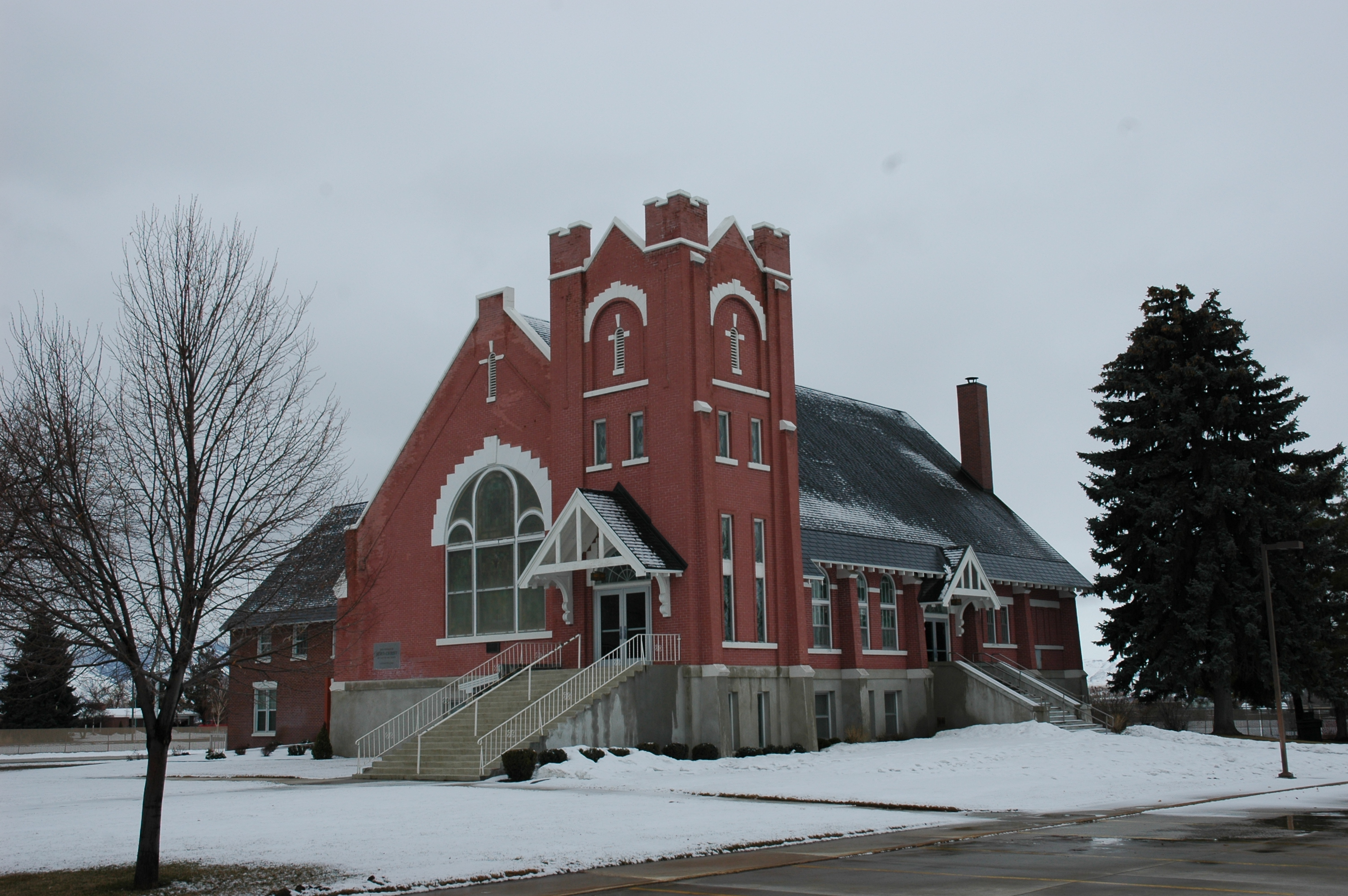
- Eastern (front) and northern sides of the tabernacle

- Location within Idaho Location within the United States
- Location: 20 S 100 W, Malad City, Oneida County, Idaho
- Coordinates: 42°11′06.42″N 112°14′55.73″W
- Area: >1 acre (>0.405 hectares)
- Built: 1914–1915
- Architect: M. E. Anderson (from Brigham City, Utah)
- Architectural style: Eclectic, influenced by the bungalow and possibly by the Romanesque Revival, among other things
- NRHP reference No.: 79000803
- Added to NRHP: July 27, 1979

The Malad Second Ward Tabernacle is a tabernacle and meetinghouse of the Church of Jesus Christ of Latter-day Saints located in Malad City, Idaho. It is significant for its large scale and unorthodox adaptation of architectural styles, as well as its historical importance to Oneida County, which once was among the most populated counties in Idaho. It is, along with six other buildings in Oneida County, listed on the National Register of Historic Places.

== Physical Description ==
=== Exterior ===
The exterior tabernacle is largely unchanged from its original appearance: the only modifications are the replacement of the wood-framed doors with metal-framed doors and the addition of metal railing to the entry steps, as well as minor work done in 1985. The one tall story of the red-brick building has a double-pitched end-gabled roof and rests on an elevated "look-out" basement. A parapeted, square corner tower (a tower set into the corner of a building) with white stone trim, which contains the main entrance, is outset from the Northeast corner of the building. The façade is also elaborated by a parapeted gable, also trimmed with white stone, and also with a molded belt course which follows the angle of the gable. A large tripartite (divided into three sections) window of primarily green stained glass centered in façade is round-headed, as are each of its three major sections. A white stone trim employing a stepped voussoir and a keystone motif is repeated above this window, the blind arches of the tower, and above the fan-lights over the front and side entrances. These entrances also have gabled overdoors, supported by volute-carved white wooden brackets.

== History ==
At the time the Malad Second Ward Tabernacle was constructed, Malad City was an important commercial center between the Salt Lake Valley in Utah and Butte, Montana. The railroad had arrived in Malad in 1906 and the population of the city would double in the next fifteen years. The tabernacle was designed by M. E. Anderson, an architect living in Brigham City, Utah at the time. A number of individual businessmen and other members of the community contributed to the construction of the building. The completion of the impressive structure was much anticipated by the Mormon residents of Malad, and its progress was well reported in Malad's Idaho Enterprise, a contemporary local newspaper (the tabernacle made the front page of the newspaper several times). At the time of its completion, the tabernacle was surrounded by fields near the railroad station.

The wood-framed doors were eventually replaced by metal-framed glass doors, and metal rails were added to the entry steps, probably in 1949.

On July 27, 1979, after a nomination by the Idaho State Historical Society, the tabernacle was added to the National Register of Historic Places for "its ambitious scale and interesting adaptation of styles" and its "special significance within its particular community." At this time several large trees had grown up on the tabernacle grounds which are no longer there today.

In 1985, minor work was done which did not significantly affect the structure of the tabernacle.

The building once served as a Latter-Day Saint stake center, but that function has now been taken up by a different building and the Malad Second Ward Tabernacle currently operates as a normal meetinghouse, serving the Second, Fourth, and Fifth Wards.

== See also ==
- Tabernacle (LDS Church)
- United Presbyterian Church (Malad City, Idaho)
- List of National Historic Landmarks in Idaho
- National Register of Historic Places listings in Oneida County, Idaho
- Oneida County, Idaho
