= Curlew National Grassland =

Protected area in southern Idaho

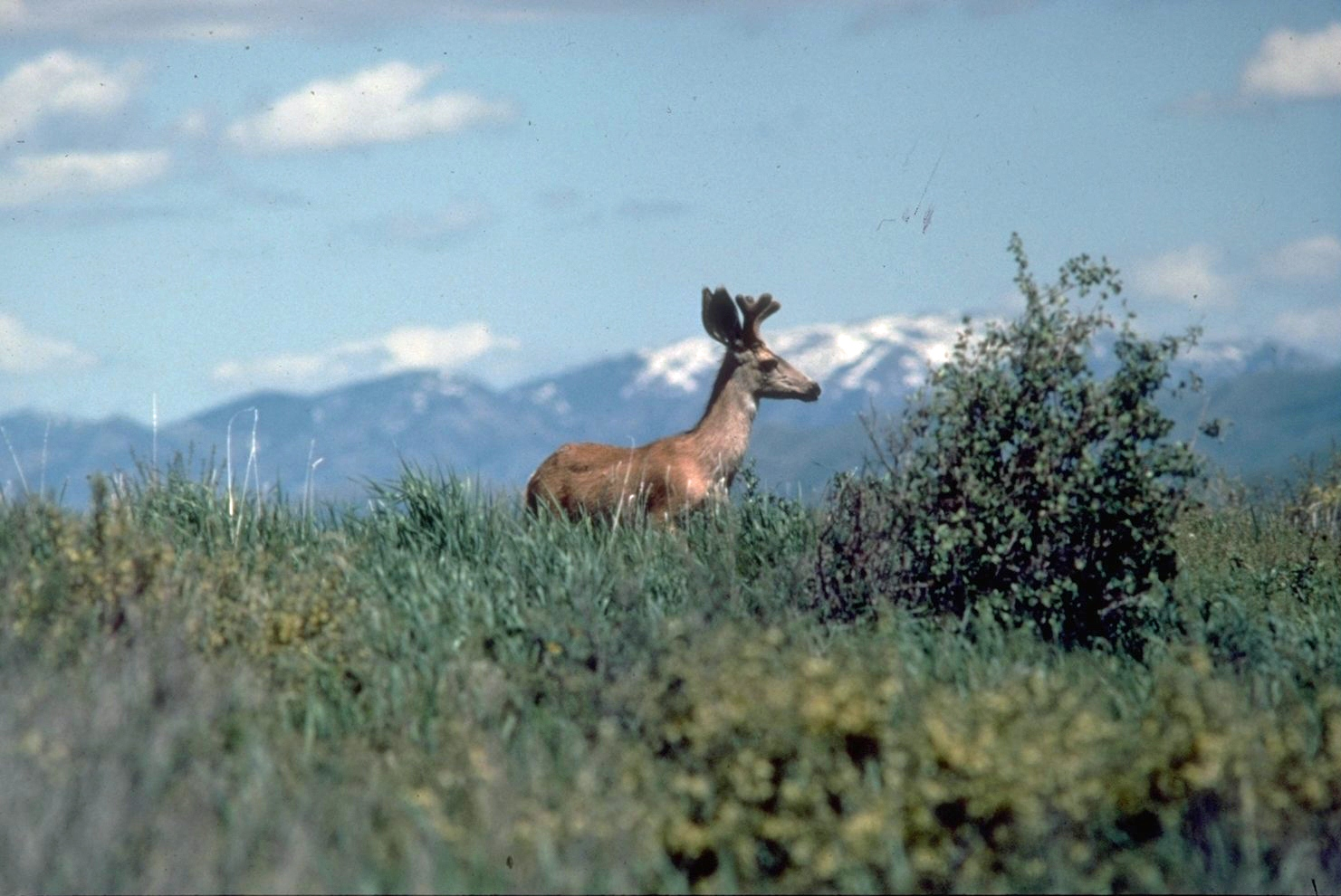
- Mule Deer at Curlew National Grassland

- Location within the United States
- Location: Oneida and Power counties, Idaho, United States
- Nearest city: Malad City, ID
- Coordinates: 42.1876°N 112.6991°W
- Area: 47,790 acres (193.4 km^{2})
- Established: 1934
- Governing body: U.S. Forest Service
- Website: Curlew National Grassland

Curlew National Grassland is a National Grassland located in Oneida and Power counties in the state of Idaho, USA. It has a land area of 47,790 acres (19,340 ha). The land used to make the grassland was purchased between 1934 and 1942. The primary goal of the grassland was to improve soil and vegetation in the area. The grassland is administered by the Forest Service together with the Caribou-Targhee National Forest from common headquarters located in Idaho Falls, Idaho. There are local ranger district offices in Malad City.
