= Power County Courthouse =

- U.S. National Register of Historic Places
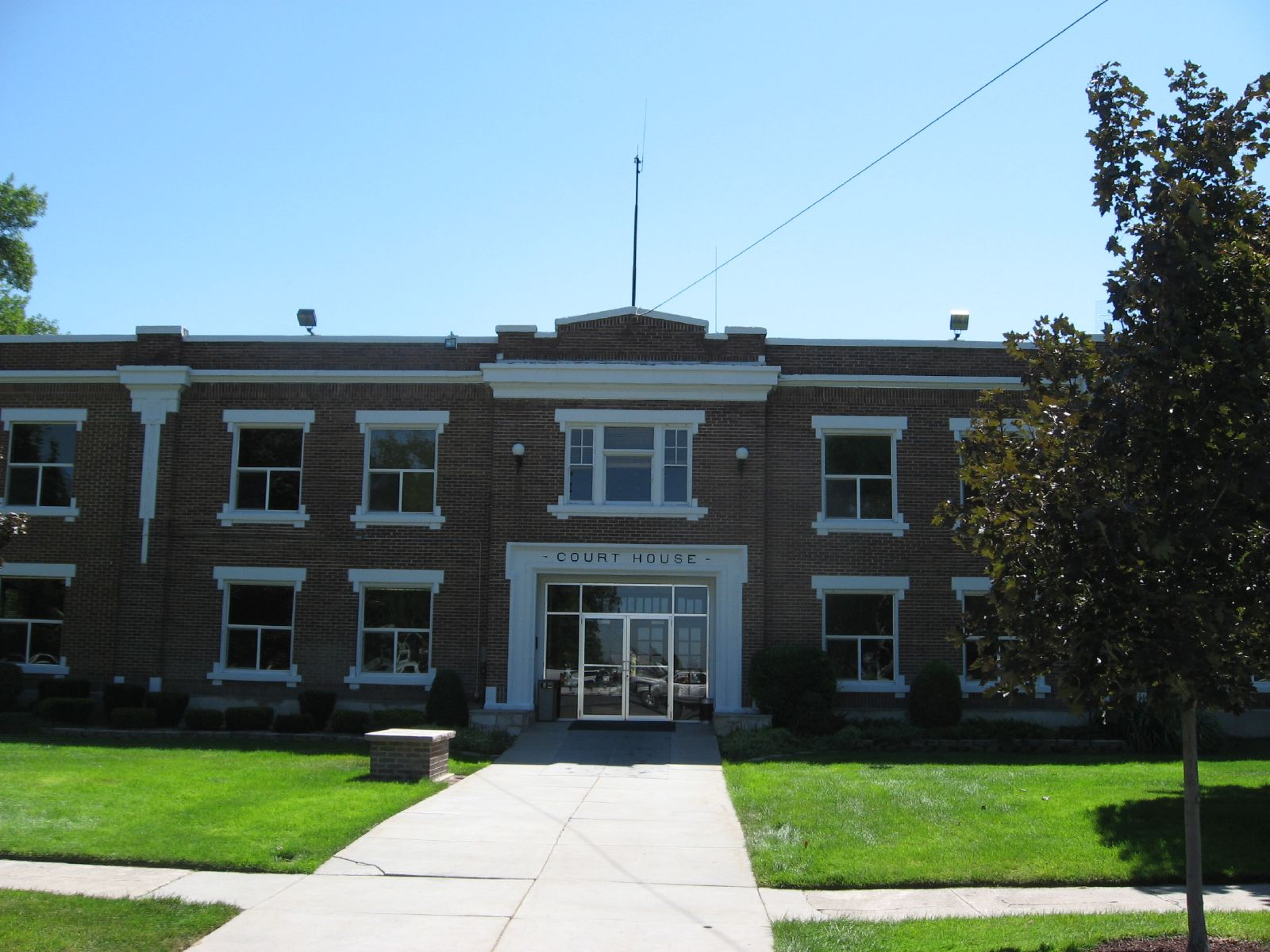

- Location within Idaho Location within the United States
- Interactive map showing the location for Power County Courthouse
- Location: 543 Bannock Ave., American Falls, Idaho
- Coordinates: 42°46′59″N 112°50′55″W
- Area: less than one acre
- Built: 1925
- Architect: C. A. Sundberg
- Architectural style: Classical Revival, Prairie School
- MPS: County Courthouses in Idaho MPS
- NRHP reference No.: 87001601
- Added to NRHP: September 22, 1987

The Power County Courthouse, at 543 Bannock Ave. in American Falls, Idaho is a historic building that includes Classical Revival and Prairie School architecture. It was a work of architect C. A. Sundberg and was built in 1925.

It was listed on the National Register of Historic Places in 1987.

According to a 1987 review, this courthouse and the Teton County Courthouse are the only two courthouses in Idaho whose architecture shows Prairie School influence.
