= Erlandsen =

Erlandsen is a surname. Notable people with the surname include:

- Arne Erlandsen (born 1959), Norwegian football manager and former footballer
- Christian Erlandsen (1926–2016), Norwegian physician and politician
- Einar E. Erlandsen (1908–1995), American politician
- Jakob Erlandsen (died 1274), Danish Roman Catholic archbishop
- Maja Erlandsen (born 1989), Norwegian freestyle wrestler
- Marius Erlandsen (born 1979), Norwegian auto racing driver
- Otto Erlandsen (1867–1959), Swedish-American builder and architect
