= Teton County Courthouse =

Teton County Courthouse may refer to:

- Teton County Courthouse (Idaho), Driggs, Idaho
- Teton County Courthouse (Montana), Choteau, Montana
