= Darwin W. Thomas =

American judge (1894–1954)

Darwin W. Thomas (September 5, 1894 – November 22, 1954) was an American attorney and a justice of the Idaho Supreme Court from 1950 to 1954.

== Early life and education ==
Born in Malad City, Idaho, he was the oldest child of David Morgan Thomas and Sarah Jane Williams Thomas. His early education through high school was in Malad City.

After graduation from Malad High School, Thomas attended the former Boise Normal School and then was a teacher for several years in St. John and Elkhorn in Oneida County and in Dayton in Franklin County. He entered the University of Idaho in Moscow in 1921 and received his LL.B from its College of Law in 1925.

== Career ==
Thomas served as the Oneida County prosecuting attorney for six years, Malad city attorney for four years, and assistant attorney general for Idaho for five years. He moved with his family from Malad to Boise in 1935 after that appointment. He was later an attorney for the Office of Price Administration and entered private practice with Eugene Anderson, a Boise attorney, about 1945.

Thomas was the first native-born Idahoan to serve on the state supreme court. He was elected to the court in 1950 to a six-year term and served from January 1, 1951 until his death.

== Personal life ==
Thomas was married to Zilla Lewis (1895–1962), also a native of Malad City. He died of a heart attack at age sixty, and was buried in the Malad City cemetery.

Political offices
Preceded by Edwin M. Holden	Justice of the Idaho Supreme Court; 1950–1954	Succeeded by E. B. Smith
