= Cherry Creek, Idaho =

Unincorporated community in the state of Idaho, United States

- Unincorporated community
- Location within Idaho Location within the United States
- Coordinates: 42°05′54″N 112°13′44″W
- Country: United States
- State: Idaho
- County: Oneida
- Established: 1865
- Elevation: 4,465 ft (1,361 m)
- Time zone: UTC-7 (Mountain (MST))
  - Summer (DST): UTC-6 (MDT)
- Postal code: 83252
- Area codes: 208, 986
- GNIS feature ID: 379220

Cherry Creek is an unincorporated community in Oneida County, Idaho, United States. Cherry Creek is 6.5 miles (10.5 km) south of Malad City.

== History ==
Cherry Creek's population was 150 in 1909.
