= Malad High School =

Public high school in Idaho, United States

Location
- 181 Jenkins Ave; Malad City, Oneida County, Idaho 83252; United States; 42°10′47″N 112°14′24″W

Information
- School type: Public, high school
- School district: Oneida County School District 351
- NCES School ID: 160249000433
- Principal: Michael Corbett
- Teaching staff: 17.95 (FTE)
- Grades: 9–12
- Enrollment: 315 (2024–2025)
- Student to teacher ratio: 17.55
- Colors: Orange; Black
- Athletics: IHSAA
- Athletics conference: Southeastern Idaho Division 3A
- Team name: Dragons
- Yearbook: The Mirror
- Website: oneidaschooldistrict.org

Malad High School is a public high school in Malad City, Idaho, United States.

== Academics ==
Malad High School as of 2024 is ranked the 88th best High School in Idaho out of 227 Idaho High Schools. Malad High School is also recognized in national rankings.

== Athletics ==
Malad's High School athletics participate in the Southeastern Idaho Conference Division 3A and are members of the Idaho High School Activities Association.

=== Boys ===
- Baseball
- Basketball
- Cross Country
- Football
- Track & Field
- Wrestling

=== Girls ===
- Basketball
- Cheerleading
- Dance
- Cross Country
- Soccer
- Softball
- Track & Field
- Volleyball

=== Notable team state finishes ===
- Boys Cross Country: 1984 (1st), 1987 (1st), 1988 (1st), 1989 (1st), 1991 (1st)
- Boys Basketball: 1985 (1st), 1992 (1st), 1994 (1st), 1996 (1st), 2005 (1st), 2006 (1st)
- Girls Basketball: 1993, 2026 (1st)
- Girls Cross Country: 1999 (1st), 2000 (1st), 2001 (1st)
- Girls Softball: 2005 (1st), 2013 (1st), 2014 (1st), 2016 (1st), 2019 (1st), 2021 (1st), 2022 (1st), 2023 (1st)
- Girls Volleyball: 1982 (1st), 1983 (1st), 1984 (1st), 1985 (1st), 1988 (1st), 2014 (1st), 2015 (1st), 2018 (1st)
- Boys Wrestling: 2009 (1st), 2014 (1st)
