= Samaria, Idaho =

Unincorporated community in the state of Idaho, United States

- Unincorporated community
- Location within Idaho Location within the United States
- Coordinates: 42°07′04″N 112°20′13″W
- Country: United States
- State: Idaho
- County: Oneida
- Elevation: 4,478 ft (1,365 m)
- Time zone: UTC-7 (Mountain (MST))
  - Summer (DST): UTC-6 (MDT)
- Area codes: 208, 986
- GNIS feature ID: 398088

- Samaria Historic District
- U.S. National Register of Historic Places
- U.S. Historic district
- Location within Idaho Location within the United States
- Location: Roughly bounded by Main and 3rd Sts., 1st Ave., N. and south end of 2nd St., Samaria, Idaho
- Area: 153 acres (62 ha)
- NRHP reference No.: 79003740
- Added to NRHP: June 11, 1979

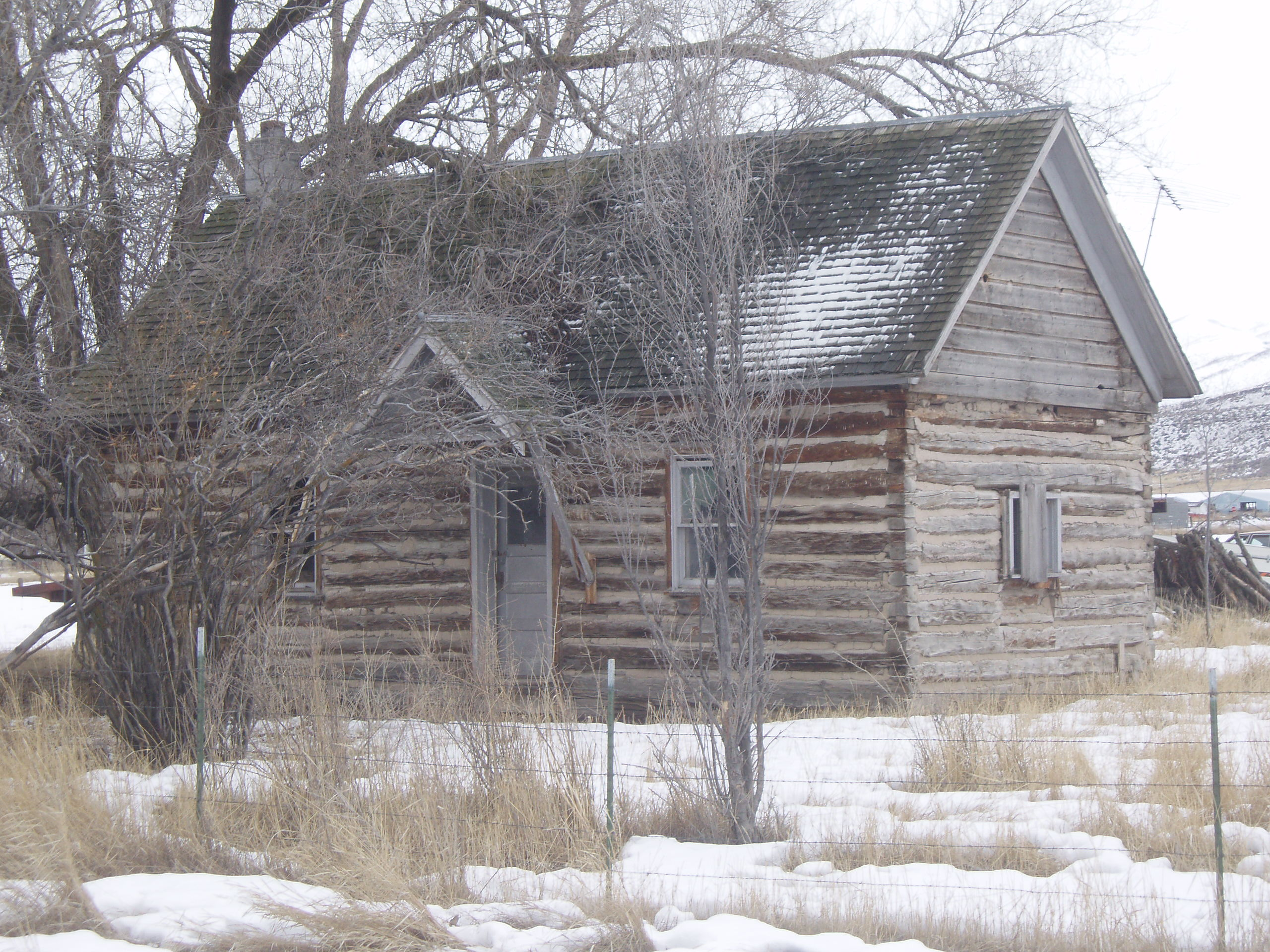
Log cabin in Samaria

Samaria is an unincorporated community in Oneida County, Idaho, United States. Samaria is 7 miles (11 km) southwest of Malad City. The Samaria Historic District is listed on the National Register of Historic Places.

The Samaria Historic District is a 153 acres (62 ha) historic district which was listed on the National Register of Historic Places in 1979. It included 36 contributing buildings.

The district is roughly bounded by Main and 3rd Sts., 1st Ave., N. and S end of 2nd St., in Samaria.

It was a Mormon town. Numerous buildings were vacant in 1974 when the NRHP application was prepared. Some former buildings in the district were demolished after the 1975 earthquake.
