= National Register of Historic Places listings in Madison County, Idaho =

Location of Madison County in Idaho

This is a list of the National Register of Historic Places listings in Madison County, Idaho.

This is intended to be a complete list of the properties on the National Register of Historic Places in Madison County, Idaho, United States. Latitude and longitude coordinates are provided for many National Register properties and districts; these locations may be seen together in a map.

There are 3 properties listed on the National Register in the county. More may be added; properties and districts nationwide are added to the Register weekly.

This National Park Service list is complete through NPS recent listings posted September 4, 2026.

== Current listings ==
	Name on the Register	Image	Date listed	Location	City or town	Description
1	Madison County Courthouse	Madison County Courthouse	September 22, 1987 (#87001587)	East Main Street; 43°49′36″N 111°46′39″W	Rexburg	
2	Rexburg Stake Tabernacle	Rexburg Stake Tabernacle	May 3, 1974 (#74000745)	25 North Center Street; 43°49′39″N 111°47′01″W	Rexburg	
3	Jacob Spori Building	Jacob Spori Building	April 20, 1989 (#89000329)	100 East 2nd, South; 43°49′16″N 111°46′53″W	Rexburg	The first building built at the permanent location of Ricks College, it was destroyed by a fire in 2000.

== Former listings ==
	Name on the Register	Image	Date listed	Date removed	Location	City or town	Description
1	Jacob Brenner House		October 29, 1982 (#82000388)	July 28, 1987	51 S. 1st, W.	Rexburg	Demolished in June 1987.

== See also ==
- List of National Historic Landmarks in Idaho
- National Register of Historic Places listings in Idaho
