= Madison County Courthouse (Idaho) =

Historic courthouse in Rexburg, Idaho, United States

- U.S. National Register of Historic Places
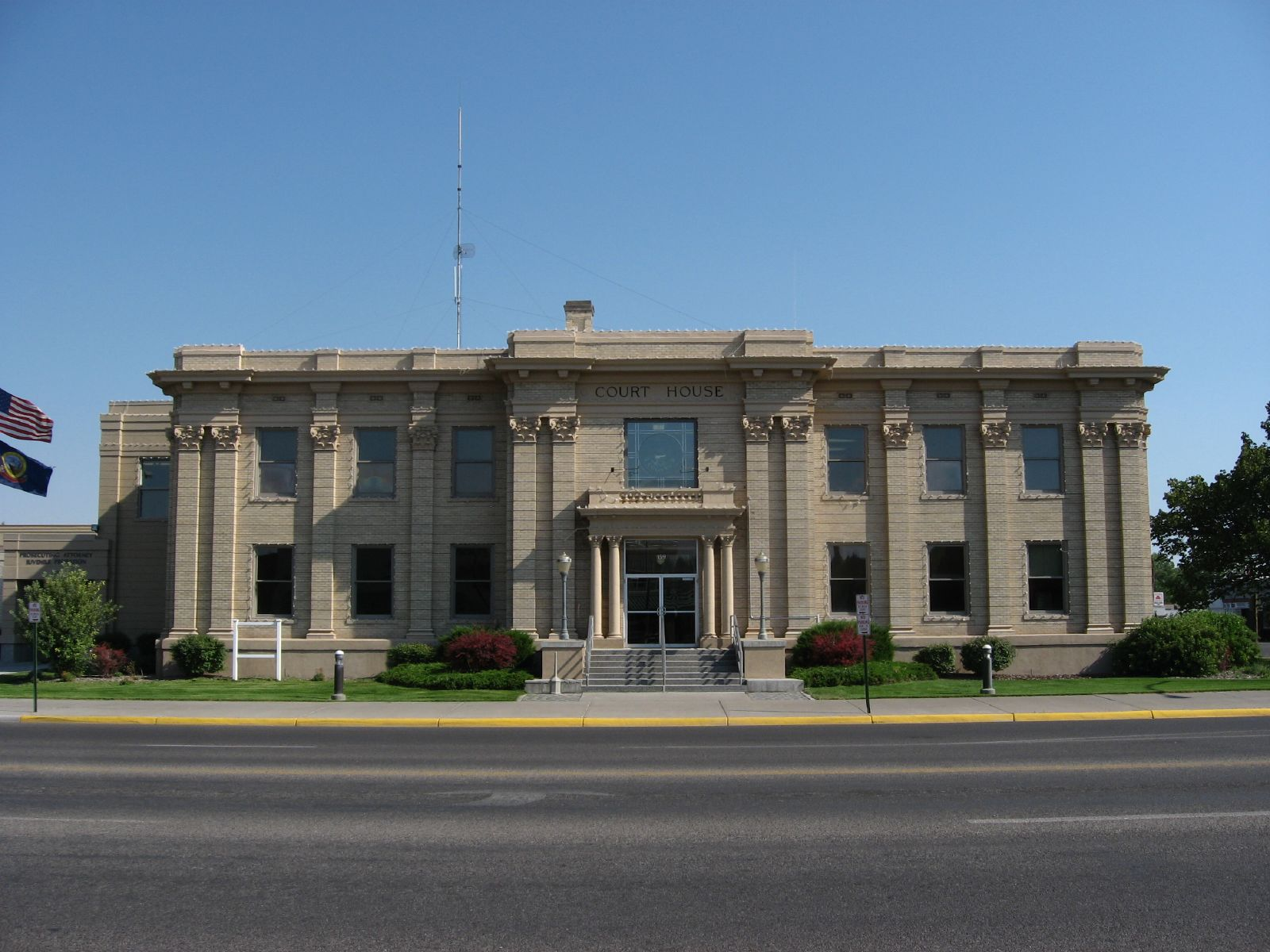

- Location within Idaho Location within the United States
- Interactive map showing the location for Madison County Courthouse
- Location: E. Main Street, Rexburg, Idaho
- Coordinates: 43°49′36″N 111°46′39″W
- Area: less than one acre
- Built: 1920
- Built by: Charles Zollinger
- Architect: C.A. Sundberg
- Architectural style: Beaux Arts
- MPS: County Courthouses in Idaho MPS
- NRHP reference No.: 87001587
- Added to NRHP: September 22, 1987

The Madison County Courthouse is a building located in Rexburg, Idaho listed on the National Register of Historic Places.

== Description ==
The Beaux Arts design of the courthouse is "ambitious and elaborate" for architect C.A. Sundberg, who went on to design a number of other county courthouses in Idaho.

== See also ==
- List of National Historic Landmarks in Idaho
- National Register of Historic Places listings in Madison County, Idaho
