= Oneida County Courthouse (Idaho) =

- U.S. National Register of Historic Places
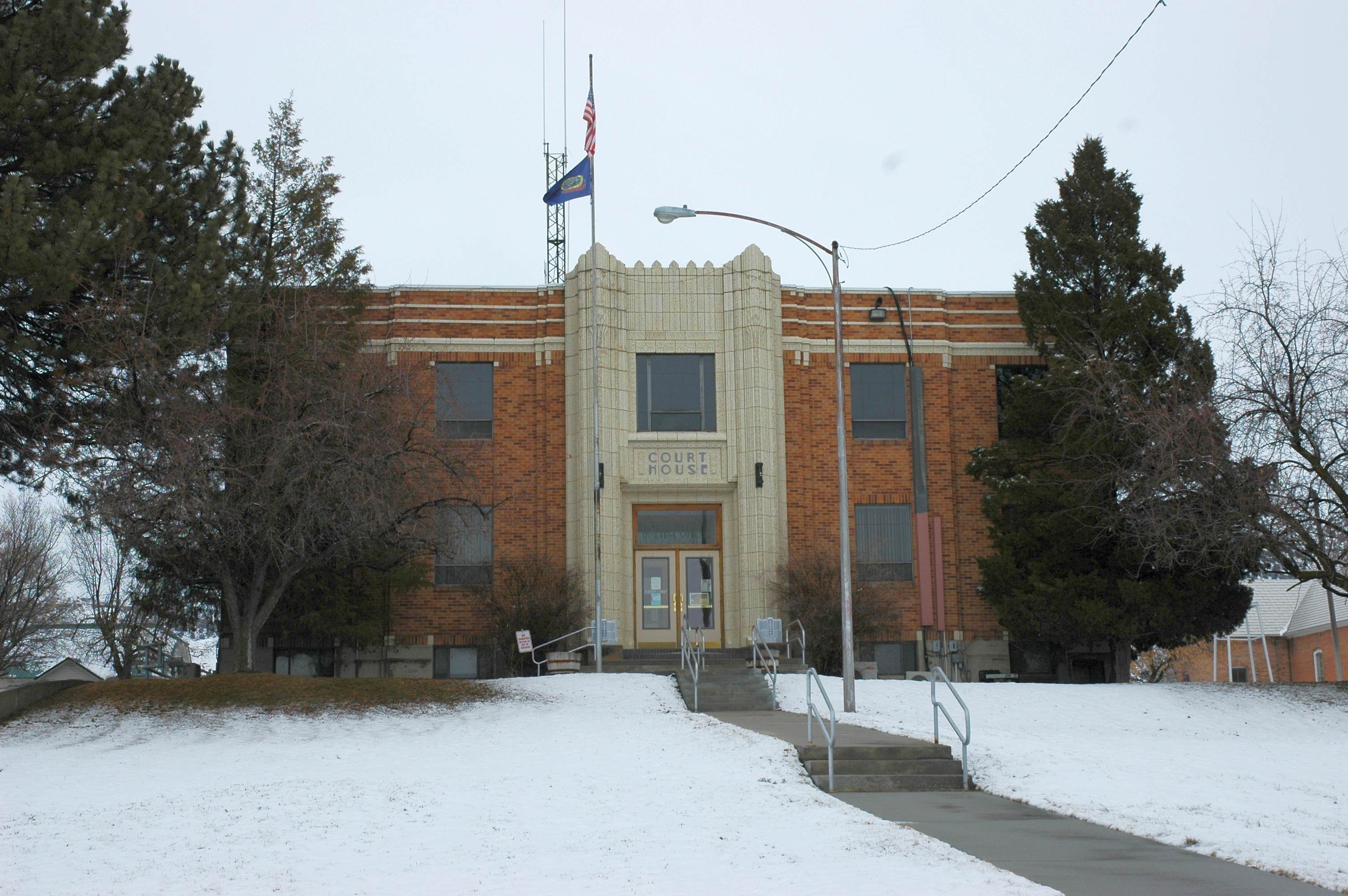
- Front entrance

- Location within Idaho Location within the United States
- Interactive map showing the location for Oneida County Courthouse
- Location: 10 E. Court St., Malad, Idaho
- Coordinates: 42°11′12″N 112°14′35″W
- Built: 1939
- Built by: Olsen & Sons
- Architect: Sundberg & Sundberg
- Architectural style: Art Deco
- MPS: County Courthouses in Idaho MPS
- NRHP reference No.: 87001588
- Added to NRHP: November 27, 1987

Oneida County Courthouse in Malad, Idaho is an Art Deco building built as a Works Project Administration (WPA) project in 1939. It serves Oneida County, Idaho. It was listed on the National Register of Historic Places in 1987.

It was designed by architects Sundberg & Sundberg, who also designed the Jefferson County Courthouse in Rigby and the Jerome County Courthouse in Jerome for WPA construction in 1938.

The courthouse replaced an 1882 Italianate courthouse.
