= Jacob Spori Building =

Historic building in Rexburg, Idaho, United States

- U.S. National Register of Historic Places
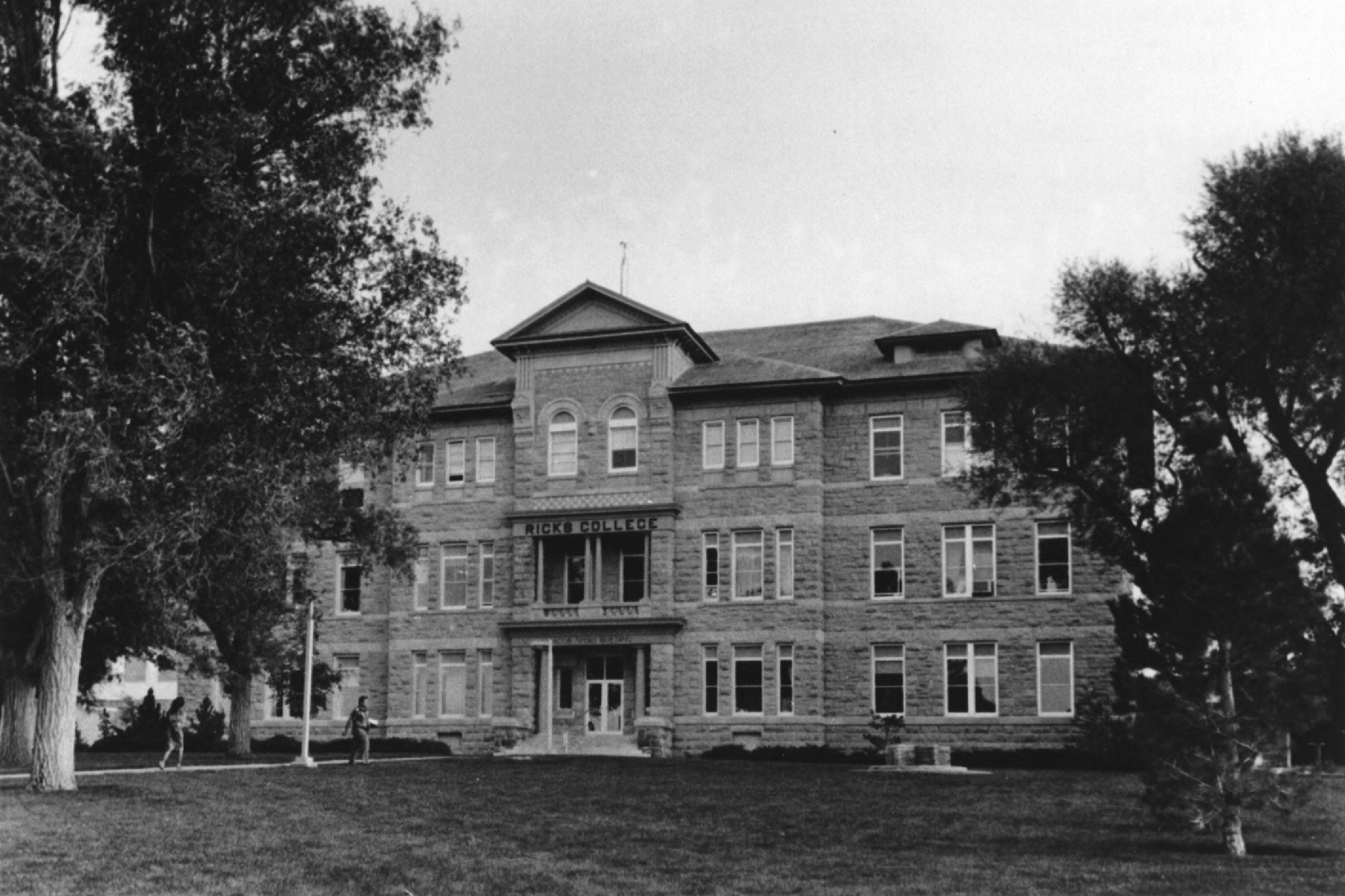
- The building's exterior in 1988

- Location within Idaho Location within the United States
- Location: 100 E. 2nd South, Rexburg, Idaho
- Coordinates: 43°49′16″N 111°46′53″W
- Area: 0.3 acres (0.12 ha)
- NRHP reference No.: 89000329
- Added to NRHP: April 20, 1989

The Jacob Spori Building was a historic building located in Rexburg, Idaho, United States, that was listed on the National Register of Historic Places. It was the first building built at the permanent location of Ricks College (now Brigham Young University–Idaho), a college founded in 1888 by The Church of Jesus Christ of Latter-day Saints.

== Description ==
It was built during 1900 to 1903. Its external walls were faced with ashlar, and were 51 inches (1.3 m) at the foundation, 32 inches (0.81 m) at the first floor windows, 28 inches (0.71 m) at the second floor windows, and 24 inches (0.61 m) at the third floor windows. Lighter colored sandstone was used for string courses encircling the building.

The building was destroyed by an accidental fire, while it was being demolished by a bulldozer on 29 November 2000. The blaze was allowed to finish the job the demolition crew had begun. A new Spori Building was built on the same site and in a similar style.

== See also ==
- List of National Historic Landmarks in Idaho
- National Register of Historic Places listings in Madison County, Idaho
