= Rexburg Stake Tabernacle =

Historic church in Idaho, United States

- U.S. National Register of Historic Places
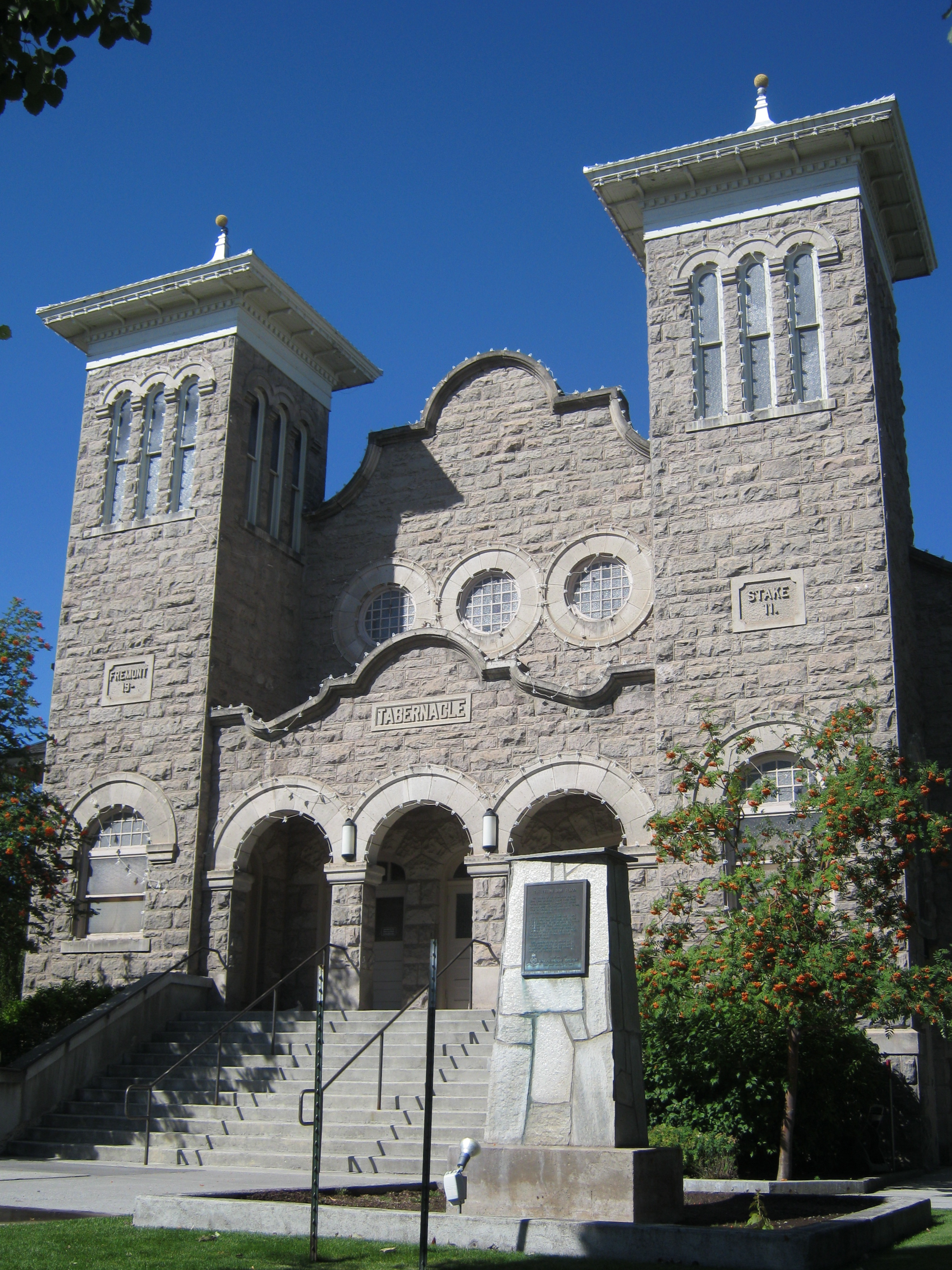

- Location within Idaho Location within the United States
- Location: 25 N. Center St. Rexburg, Idaho
- Coordinates: 43°49′39″N 111°47′01″W
- Built: 1911
- Architect: Otto Erlandsen
- NRHP reference No.: 74000745
- Added to NRHP: December 8, 1974

The Rexburg Stake Tabernacle, also known as the Fremont Stake Tabernacle, is a building located in Rexburg, Idaho that formerly served as tabernacle for large gatherings of members of the Church of Jesus Christ of Latter-day Saints. The tabernacle was designed by architect Otto Erlandsen and completed in 1911 at a cost of $31,000. The building was listed on the National Register of Historic Places in 1974. In 1980, the building was sold to the city of Rexburg and now serves as a civic center and is home of the Rexburg Children's Choir.

In 2020, the Rexburg Tabernacle was visible to a nationwide audience when NBC Nightly News and Inside Edition highlighted the children's choir's ability to persist during the COVID-19 pandemic.

== See also ==
- List of National Historic Landmarks in Idaho
- National Register of Historic Places listings in Madison County, Idaho
