= Jedd Jones House =

Historic house in Idaho, United States

- U.S. National Register of Historic Places
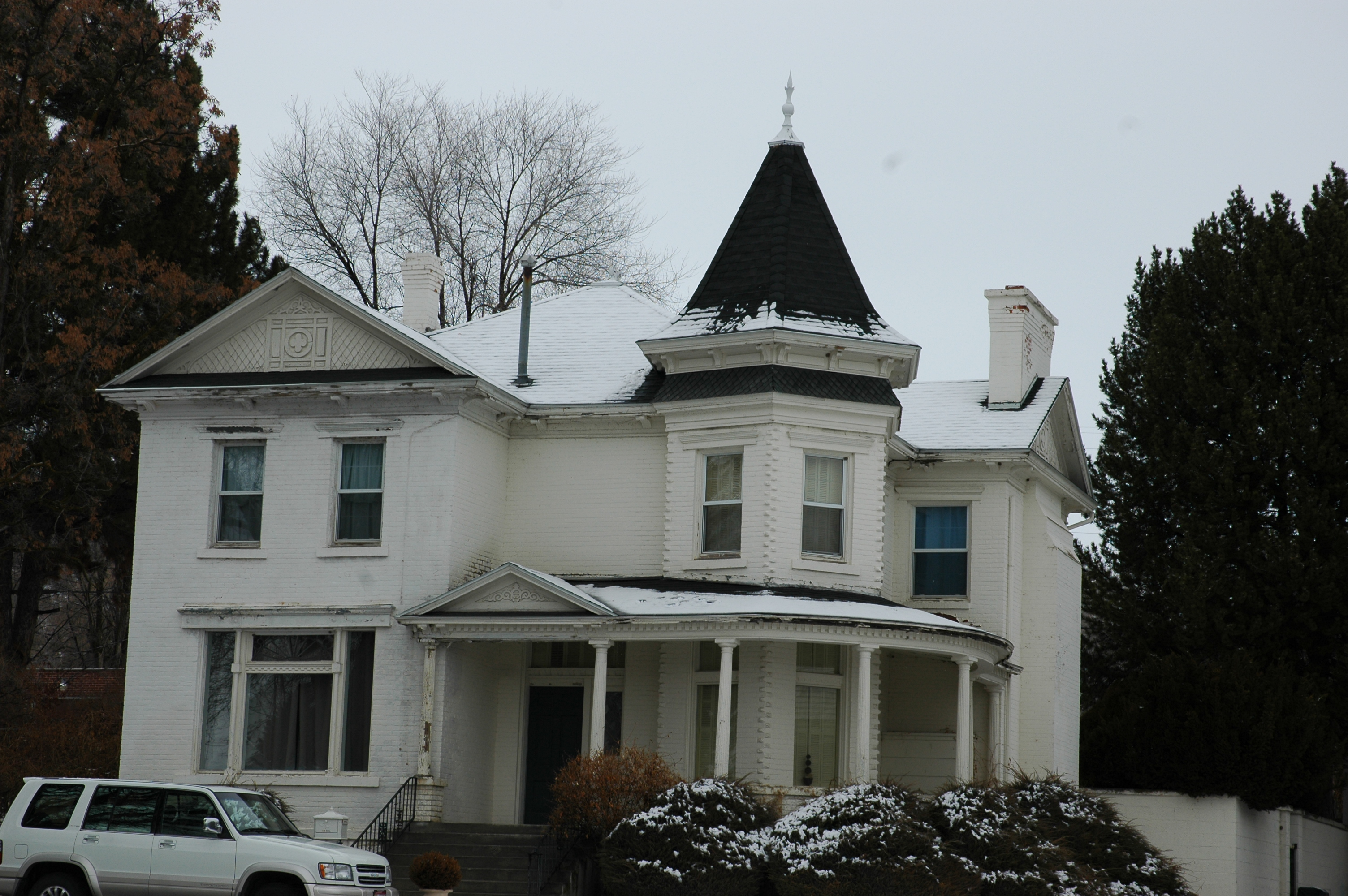

- Location within Idaho Location within the United States
- Location: 242 N. Main St., Malad City, Idaho
- Coordinates: 42°11′27″N 112°14′38″W
- Area: less than one acre
- Built: 1905
- Architect: Lawyer & Wood
- Architectural style: Queen Anne, Queen Anne/Western Colonial
- NRHP reference No.: 79000806
- Added to NRHP: May 1, 1979

The Jedd Jones House in Malad City, Idaho was built in 1905. It was listed on the National Register of Historic Places in 1979.

Its NRHP nomination asserts:

The wider architectural significance of the house stems from the impression of quality evinced by its precise and well-preserved rendering and architectural detail. It is as fine an example as any in the state—its effectiveness in this regard is reduced only by the overall white paint which obscures the modestly polychromatic exterior which the red brick together with the white gables would once have displayed—of what we have called the Queen-Anne-goingWestern-Colonial-style, That is, it illustrates very aptly the movement from the asymmetrical and visually elaborate Queen-Anne style, which was popular in Idaho's upper-class residential architecture during the last decade of the 19th century, and towards the more symmetrical and severe Western Colonial, which was popular throughout the state in the first decade of the twentieth; the transitional and later styles are more prevalent in slower-developing, agrarian southeast Idaho than is the earlier one.
