= Otto Erlandsen =

Swedish-American builder and architect

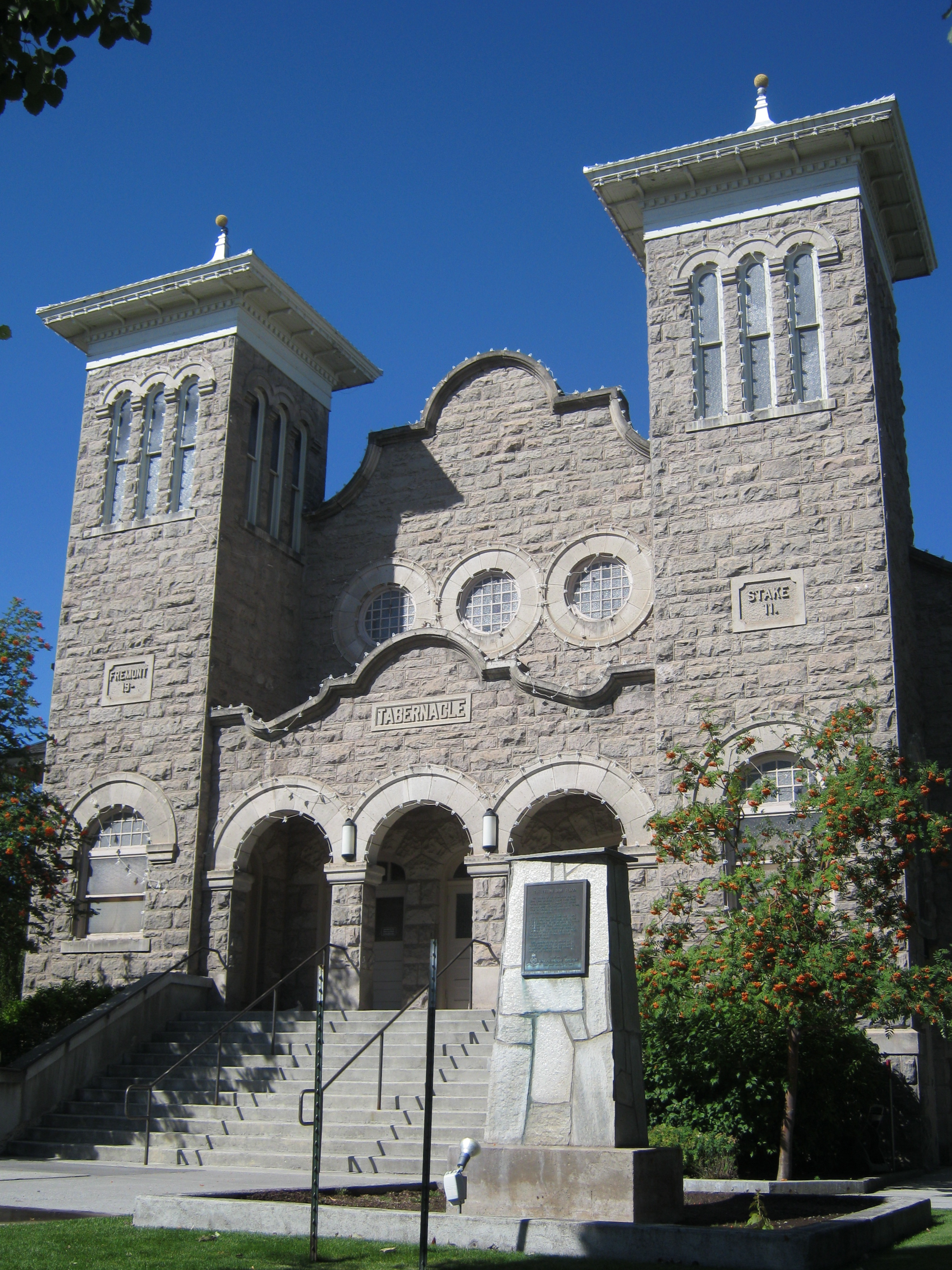
Rexburg Stake Tabernacle now Rexburg Tabernacle Community Center

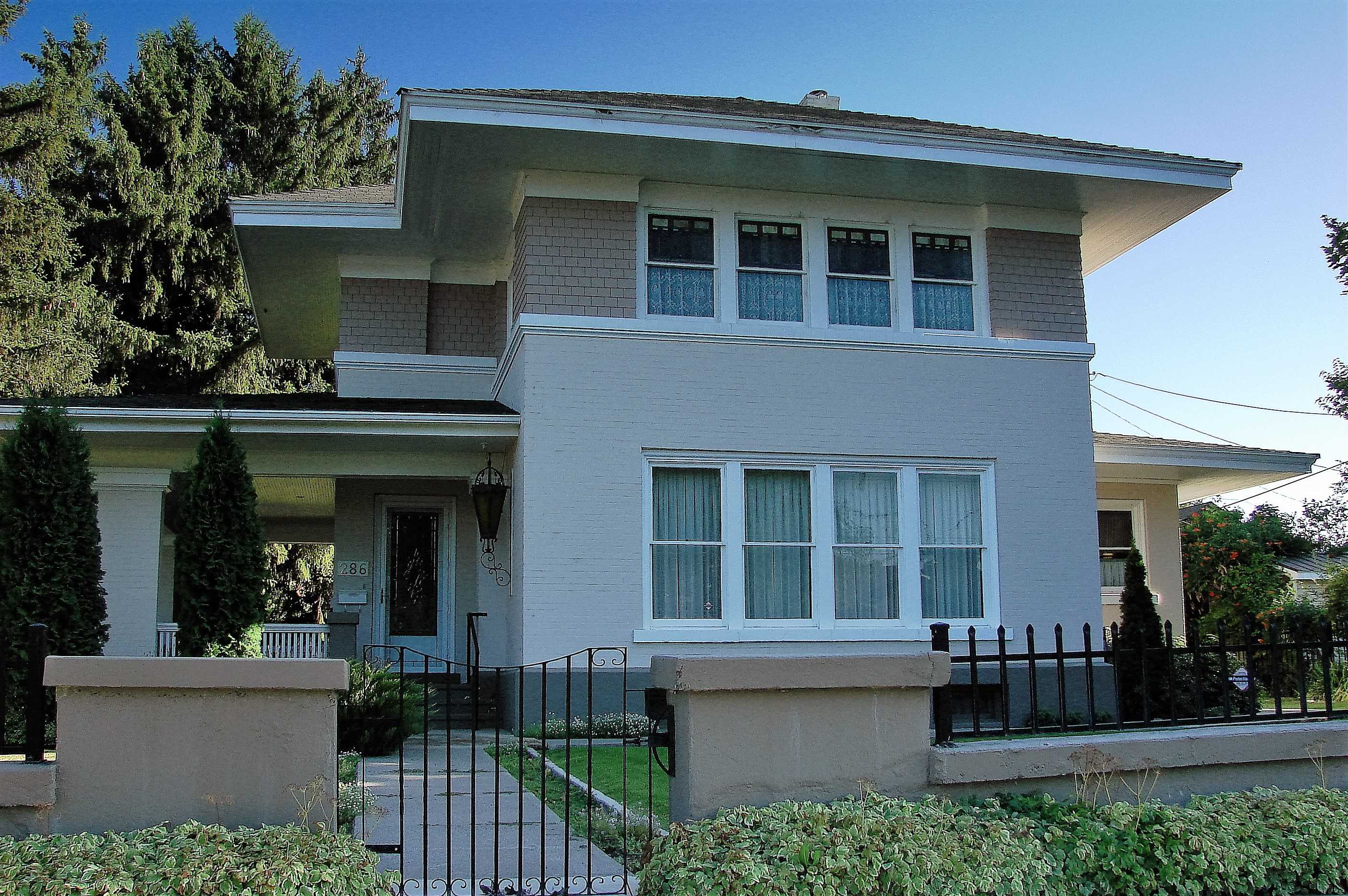
Erlandsen Home in Payson, Utah

Otto Bernhard Erlandson (September 20, 1867 – October 11, 1959) was a Swedish-American builder and architect in the Intermountain West in the early-20th century. Erlandson was born a son of Elias and Kjersti (Lundstett) Erlandson in Malmo, Sweden. His brother was Henry Erlandson (b. 1875). The family emigrated to Utah Territory with his parents and siblings in 1870 as converts to the Church of Jesus Christ of Latter-day Saints (LDS Church). He was schooled in Payson, Utah and took mechanical drawing classes at Utah State University.

Erlandsen's most notable designs were the Rexburg and Nebo Stake Tabernacles for the LDS Church. Rexburg Stake Tabernacle (now Rexburg Tabernacle Community Center) is listed on the National Register of Historic Places. Nebo Stake Tabernacle was demolished in the 1980s.

Otto Erlandsen and his brother Henry Erlandson operated Central Lumber Company in Payson. They resided in a Prairie-style home built during 1910 in Payson that remains a local historic home of architectural importance.
