= Co-op Block and J. N. Ireland Bank =

- U.S. National Register of Historic Places
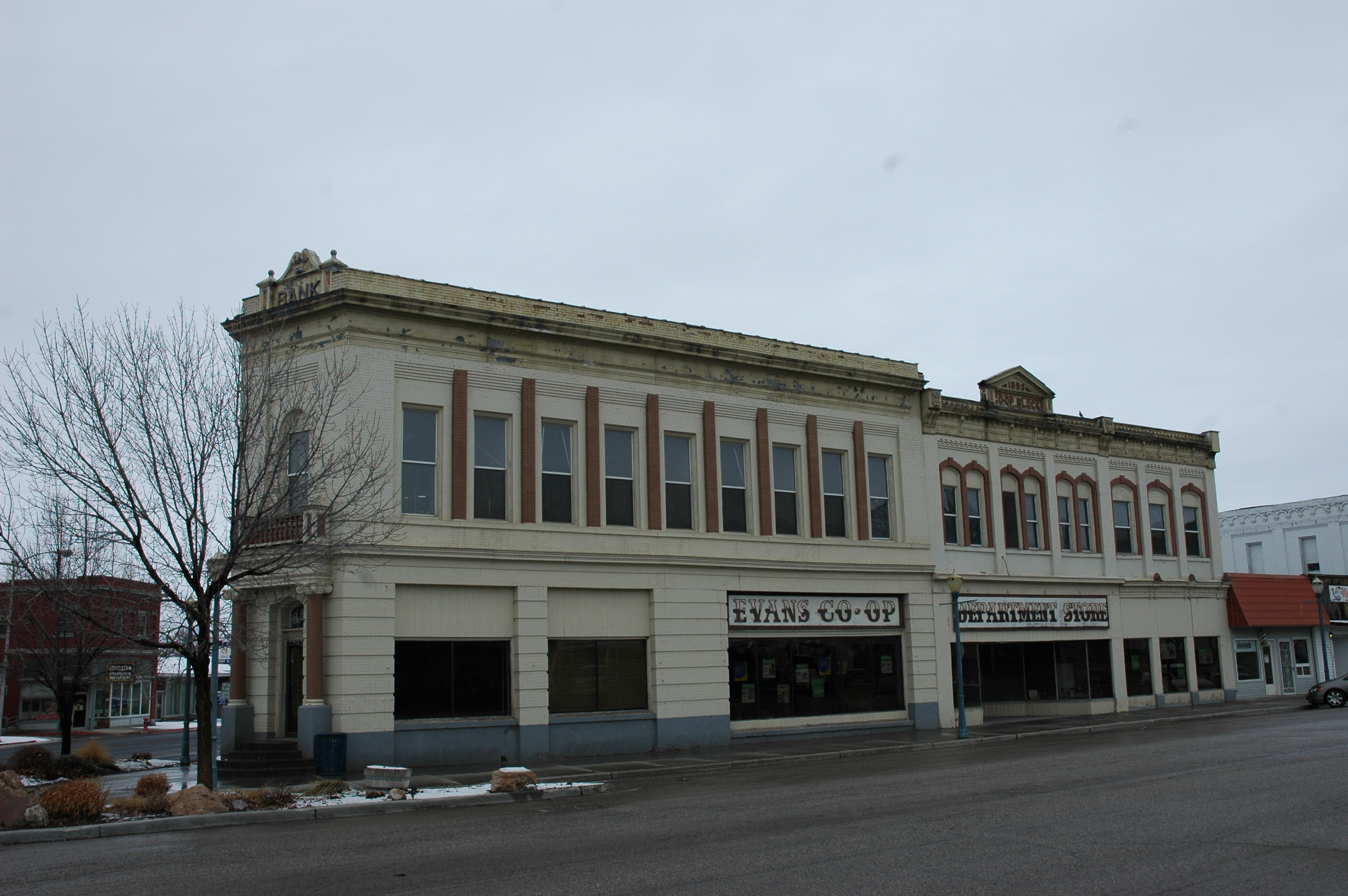
- The edifice in 2010

- Location within Idaho Location within the United States
- Location: Main and Bannock Sts., Malad City, Idaho
- Coordinates: 42°11′11″N 112°14′42″W
- Area: less than one acre
- Built: 1893, 1907
- Architectural style: Late 19th And 20th Century Revivals, Second Renaissance Revival
- NRHP reference No.: 79000804
- Added to NRHP: April 18, 1979

The Co-op Block and J. N. Ireland Bank is a commercial block in Malad City, Idaho. It was added to the National Register of Historic Places on April 18, 1979.

A section facing onto Main and a section facing onto Bannock were built in 1893, as part of an L-shaped structure built around a pre-existing wood-frame building at the corner. The corner building was replaced in 1907 by the J. N. Ireland and Co. Bank building. The entire block was built of red brick which was later whitewashed.

== See also ==
- List of National Historic Landmarks in Idaho
- National Register of Historic Places listings in Oneida County, Idaho
