= D.L. Evans Sr. Bungalow =

Historic house in Idaho, United States

- U.S. National Register of Historic Places
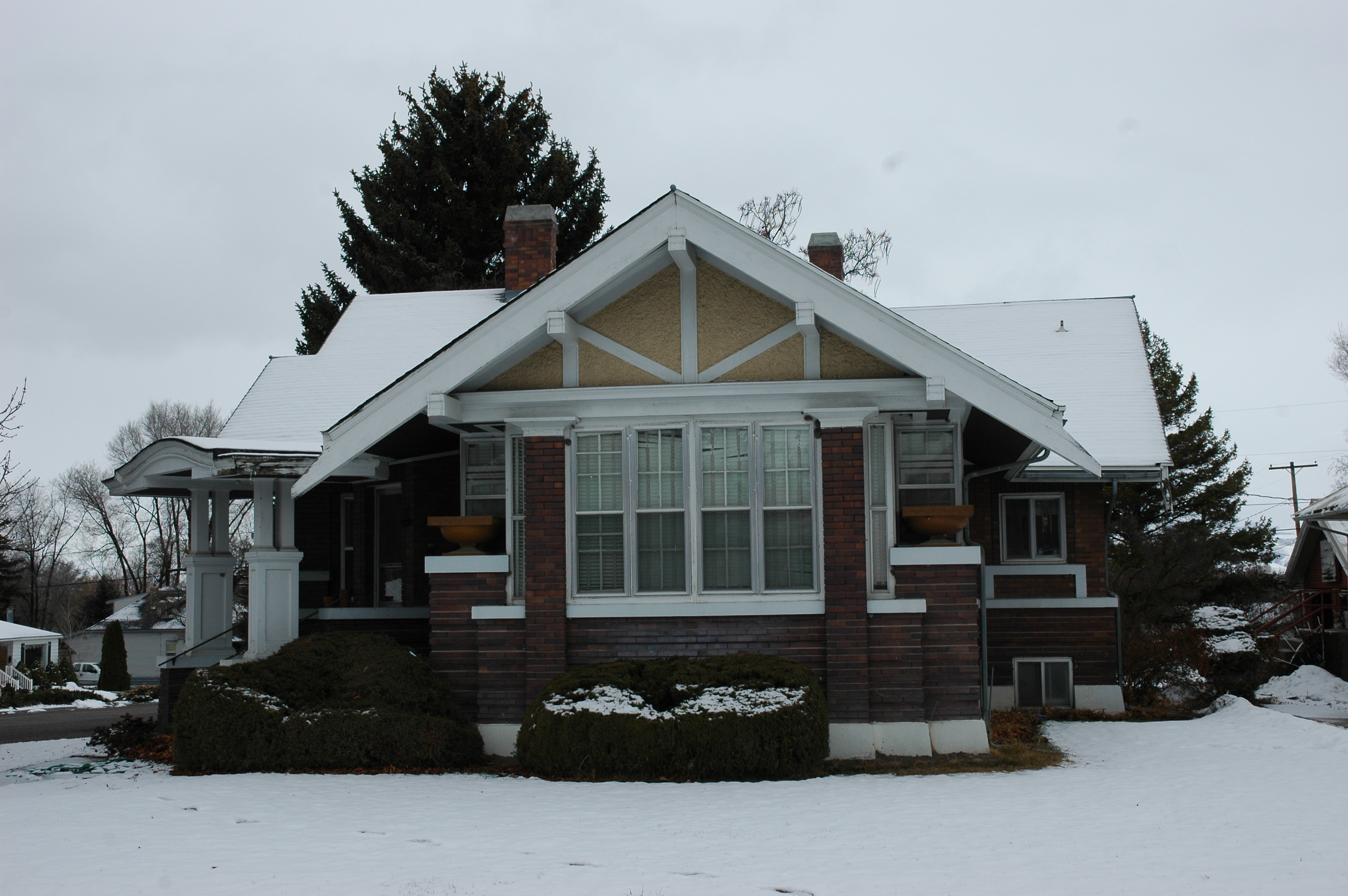

- Location within Idaho Location within the United States
- Location: 203 N. Main St, Malad City, Idaho
- Coordinates: 42°11′24″N 112°14′41″W
- Area: less than one acre
- Built: 1915
- Built by: Madson, D.L.
- Architectural style: Bungalow/craftsman
- NRHP reference No.: 79000805
- Added to NRHP: August 30, 1979

The D.L. Evans Sr. Bungalow, located at 203 N. Main St in Malad City, Idaho, was built in 1915. It was listed on the National Register of Historic Places in 1979.

It is a Bungalow/craftsman-style house built in 1915. Its NRHP nomination deems it "significant architecturally as an elaborate, expensive, unusual, and almost pristine example of the bungalow style. It is also significant in the social history of Malad and Idaho as the residence of one of its foremost families; a family which, not incidentally, had a business interest in the popularization of bungalows."
