= United Presbyterian Church (Malad City, Idaho) =

Historic church in Idaho, United States

- U.S. National Register of Historic Places
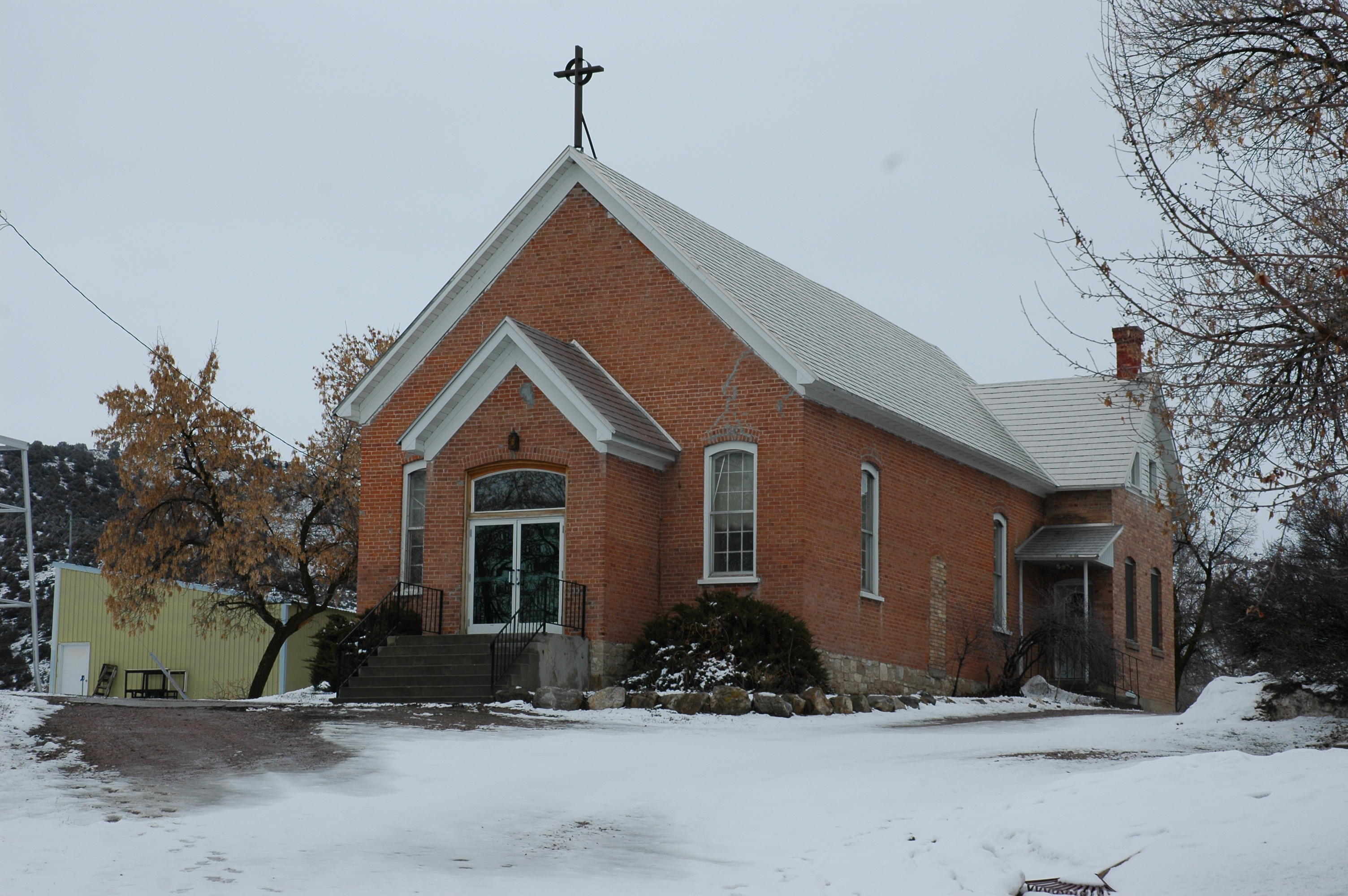
- The church's exterior in 2010

- Location within Idaho Location within the United States
- Location: S. Main St., Malad City, Idaho
- Coordinates: 42°11′10.0″N 112°14′36.5″W
- Area: less than one acre
- Built: 1882
- NRHP reference No.: 79000807
- Added to NRHP: October 16, 1979

The United Presbyterian Church in Malad City, Idaho was built in 1882 and was listed on the National Register of Historic Places in 1979.

Its NRHP nomination describes it as "a small and unpretentious brick chapel".

== See also ==
- List of National Historic Landmarks in Idaho
- National Register of Historic Places listings in Oneida County, Idaho
