= Teton County Courthouse (Idaho) =

- U.S. National Register of Historic Places
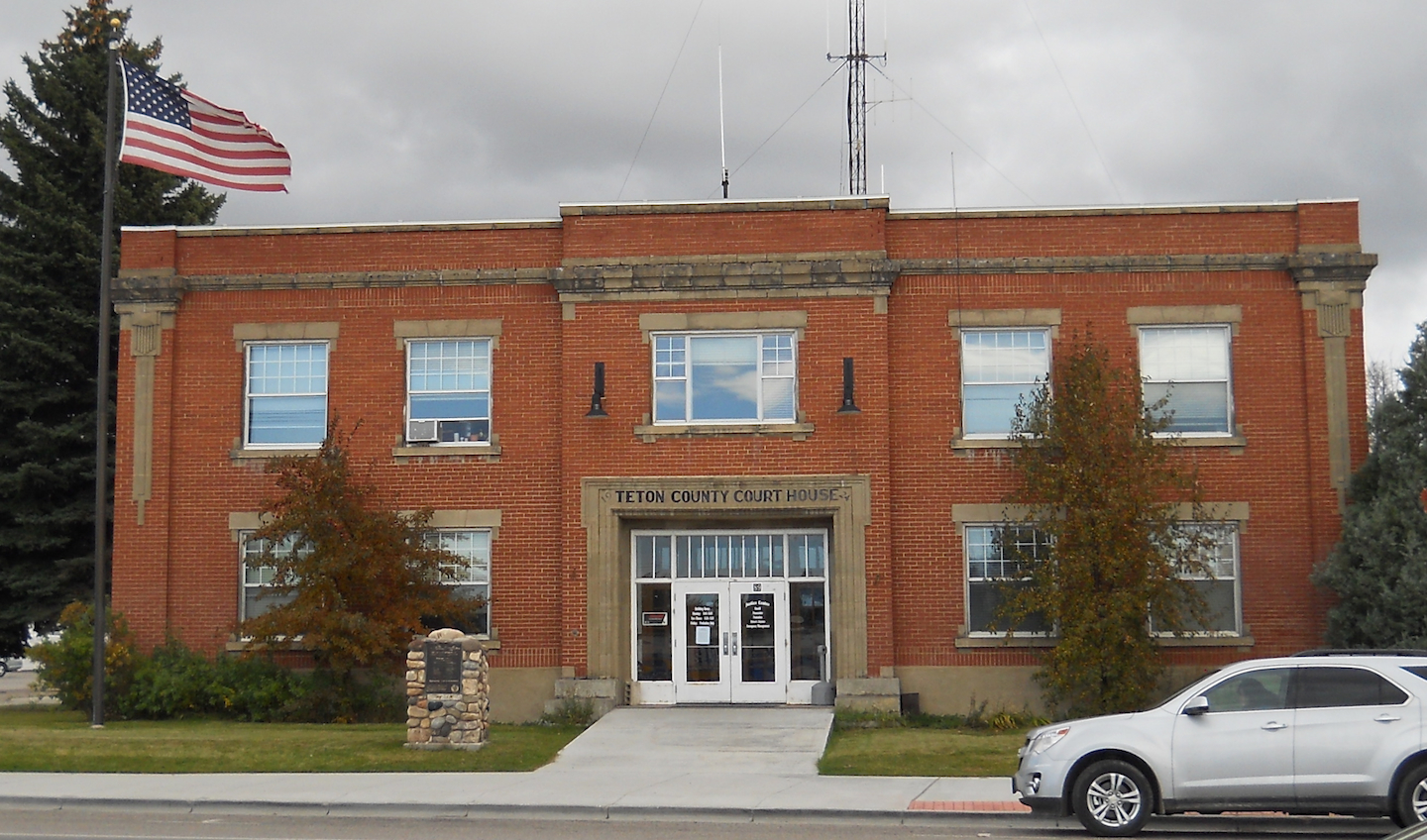

- Location within Idaho Location within the United States
- Interactive map showing the location for Teton County Courthouse
- Location: Main St., Driggs, Idaho
- Coordinates: 43°43′28″N 111°6′36″W
- Area: less than one acre
- Built: 1924
- Built by: Zollinger, Charles
- Architect: C.A. Sundberg
- Architectural style: Classical Revival, Prairie School
- MPS: County Courthouses in Idaho MPS
- NRHP reference No.: 87001589
- Added to NRHP: September 22, 1987

The Teton County Courthouse is a building in Driggs, Idaho which was listed on the National Register of Historic Places in 1987.

Its design is attributed to C. A. Sundberg and it was built by Charles Zollinger.

Its NRHP nomination concluded: "Like most courthouses in Idaho, the building represents the most elaborate and monumental architectural design in its community."

== See also ==
- List of National Historic Landmarks in Idaho
- National Register of Historic Places listings in Teton County, Idaho
