= Jerome County Courthouse =

- U.S. National Register of Historic Places
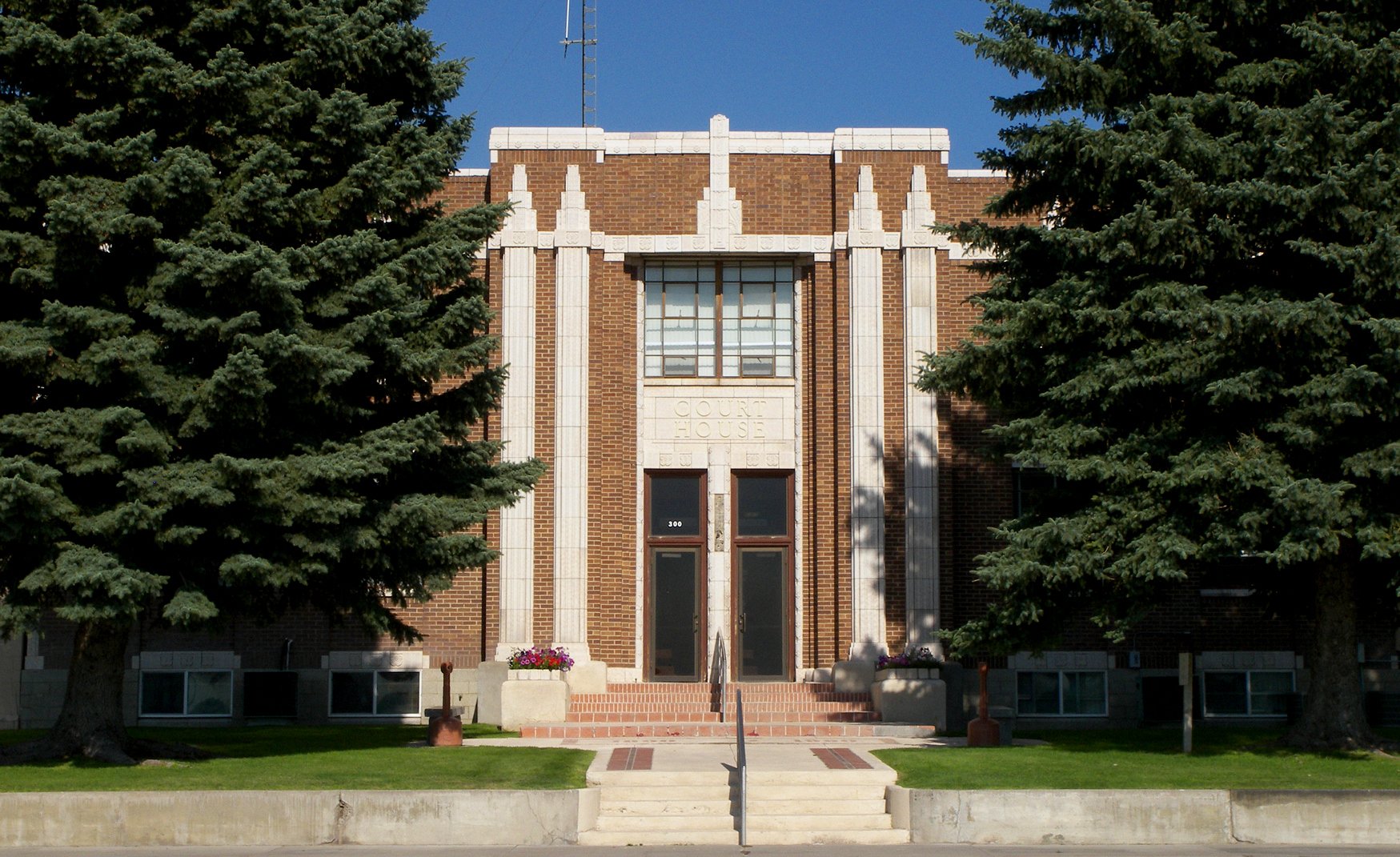
- Jerome County Courthouse in 2009

- Location within Idaho Location within the United States
- Interactive map showing the location of Jerome County Courthouse
- Location: 300 North Lincoln; Jerome, Idaho, United States
- Coordinates: 42°43′36″N 114°31′1″W
- Area: less than one acre
- Built: 1938
- Built by: Paul R. Kartzke
- Architect: Sundberg & Sundberg
- Architectural style: Art Deco
- MPS: County Courthouses in Idaho MPS
- NRHP reference No.: 87001600
- Added to NRHP: September 28, 1987

The Jerome County Courthouse is a building located in Jerome, Idaho, United States that was listed on the National Register of Historic Places in 1987. It was built in 1938.

== See also ==
- National Register of Historic Places listings in Jerome County, Idaho
- List of National Historic Landmarks in Idaho
