= Malad City, Idaho =

- City
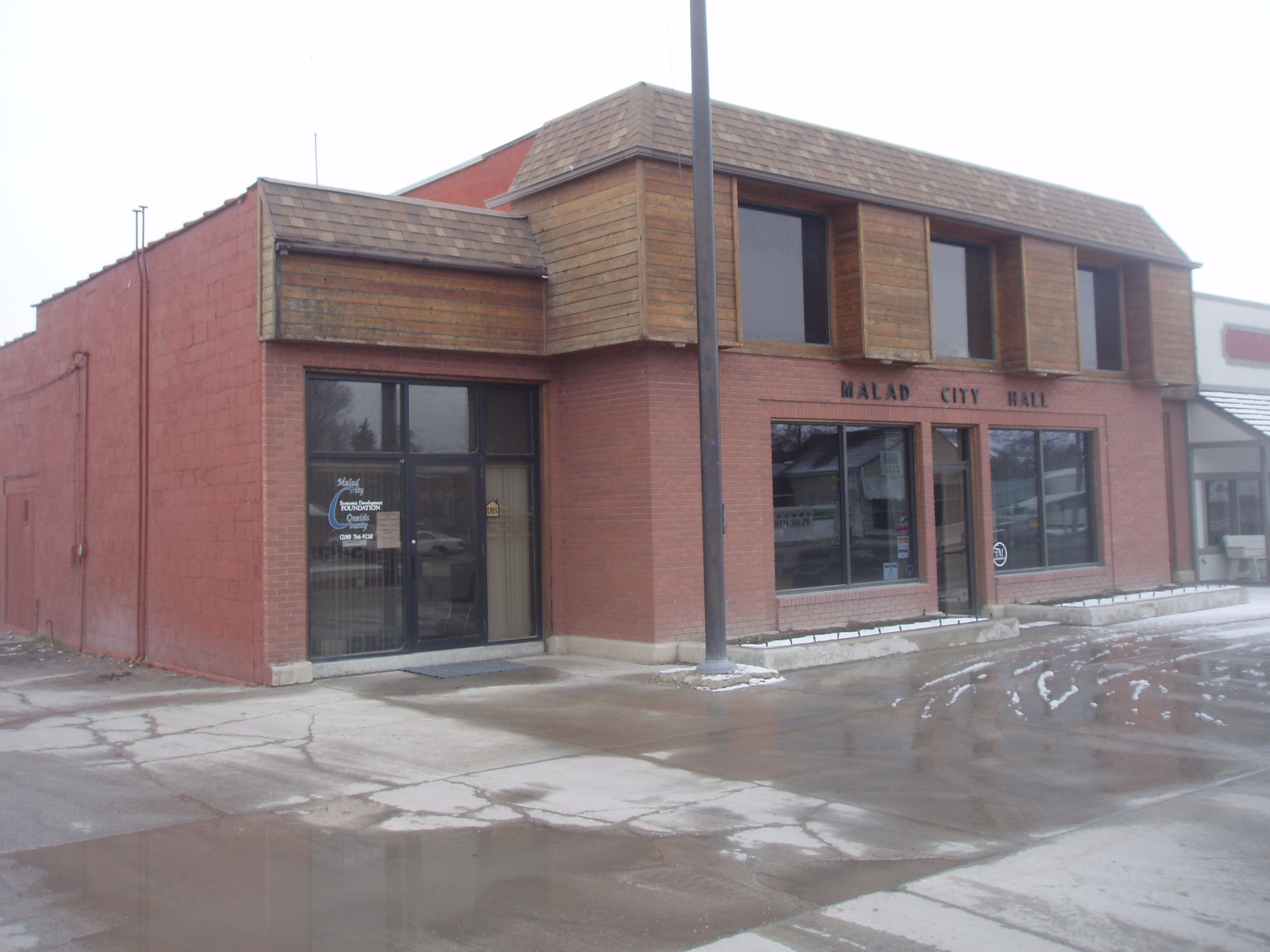
- City Hall in March 2010
- Motto: Where Idaho Begins
- Location of Malad City in Oneida County, Idaho.

- Location in the United States
- Coordinates: 42°11′30″N 112°15′10″W
- Country: United States
- State: Idaho
- County: Oneida
- Founded: 1864

Area
  - Total: 1.64 sq mi (4.25 km^{2})
  - Land: 1.64 sq mi (4.25 km^{2})
  - Water: 0 sq mi (0.00 km^{2})
- Elevation: 4,551 ft (1,387 m)

Population (2020)
  - Total: 2,299
  - Density: 1,301.9/sq mi (502.67/km^{2})
- Time zone: UTC−7 (Mountain (MST))
  - Summer (DST): UTC−6 (MDT)
- ZIP code: 83252
- Area codes: 208, 986
- FIPS code: 16-50140
- GNIS feature ID: 2410911
- Website: www.maladidaho.org

Malad City (also commonly known as Malad) is the only city in and the county seat of Oneida County, Idaho, United States. In 2020 the population was 2,299 people.

The city is named after the nearby Malad River, the name being French for "sickly". Malad City is located along Interstate 15 on the east side of the Malad Valley 13 miles (21 km) from the Utah/Idaho border.

== History ==
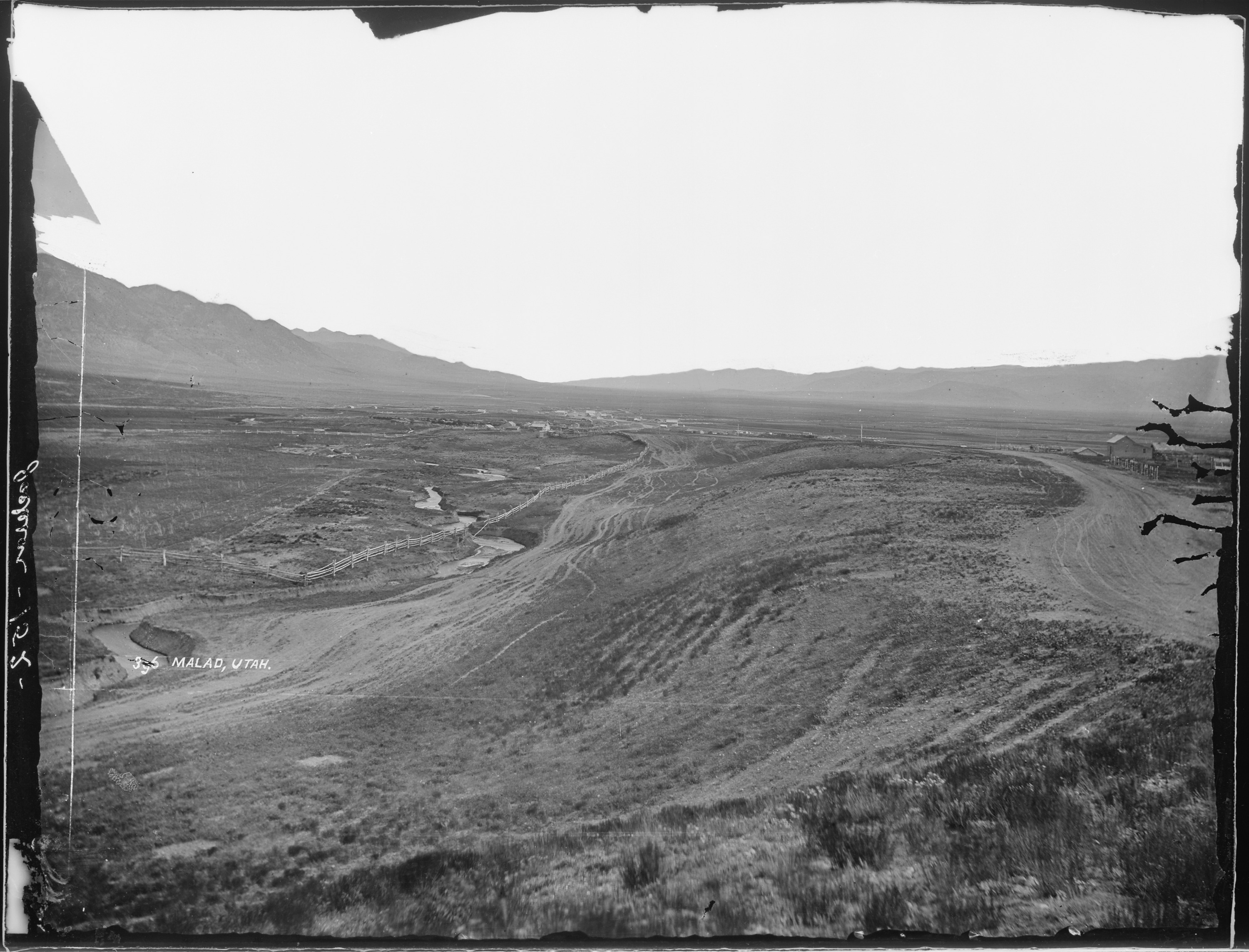
Malad, 1872. Photo by William Henry Jackson.

Established in 1864, Malad is one of the oldest communities in the state of Idaho. The community received its name from Donald Mackenzie, a Scottish-Canadian trapper, who passed through the valley between 1818 and 1821 with a party of trappers. Some of his men became sick while camped here and, believing that the illness was caused by drinking water from the valley's principal stream, he named it "Malade" meaning sick or bad in the French language. Actually, the water had nothing to do with the men's illness, as it was later learned by the second party led by Jim Bridger between 1832 and 1835. The men had most likely eaten some beaver that fed on the poisonous roots of water hemlock trees that put a naturally occurring cicutoxin into the animals' flesh. The beaver would have likely been immune to the poison because of long-term adaptation, but the trappers suffered from their feast. Native tribes avoided this outcome by altering food preparation methods to include boiling, which apparently deactivated the poison.

Malad began largely as a Welsh LDS settlement, whose settlers brought their Welsh traditions with them. In addition to the LDS majority, some of the leading families in the community belonged to the Reorganized Church of Jesus Christ of Latter Day Saints. These two denominations each built a place of worship in the town. Some of the minutes from early town meetings were taken down in both English and Welsh. The city is very proud of its Welsh heritage. Malad lays claim to having more people of Welsh descent per capita than anywhere outside Wales. Malad celebrated its Welsh heritage by holding an annual “eisteddfod”, patterned after the music and poetry contests held in Wales for over 900 years. The eisteddfod was an all-day event with people coming from all over southeastern Idaho. The event featured music, songs and storytelling of Wales. The custom continued until 1916 and the American entry into World War I. With the goal of renewing the old eisteddfod tradition in Malad, in 2004, the annual Malad Valley Welsh Festival was established.

In the summer of 1843 John C. Fremont and his party of 39 men passed the spot where Malad City now stands.

LDS prophet Brigham Young came through the Malad Valley in 1855. In 1856, at his request, Utahn members of the Church of Jesus Christ of Latter-day Saints migrated to the region. This party of 15 families led by Ezra Barnard traveled to the Malad Valley and established a community by the name of Fort Stuart. The following year in 1857, Fort Stuart was renamed Malad City. A U.S. post office was established in 1865.

By 1886 Malad City was the fastest growing village in eastern Idaho. The city was an important commercial center between Salt Lake and Butte, Montana. In 1906, the railroad reached Malad City, allowing travel to Salt Lake City in only a four-hour ride by rail. The population of the city would double over the next 15 years as a result.

On June 19, 1910, Malad experienced a flood when the earthen Deep Creek Dam, northeast of the city, broke.

On March 27, 1975, a magnitude 6.1 earthquake shook the Pocatello Valley near the Idaho-Utah border. The epicenter was only 15 miles (24 km) southwest of Malad City which was hit hardest by the quake. Nearly two-thirds of its homes and businesses had some sort of damage.

A corporate jet carrying eight people including four Coca-Cola executives crashed on January 15, 1996, killing all on board. The large twin-engine turbo-prop was flying from Salt Lake City, Utah to Pocatello, Idaho for a Coca-Cola sales meeting. The Mitsubishi MU-2 aircraft crashed and burned at the base of a canyon 8 miles (13 km) northwest of Malad. According to the National Transportation Safety Board in its published report, the cause of the accident was listed as ice on the wings.

Towards the end of 2003, a nationwide influenza outbreak occurred. Malad was, appropriately, likely the hardest hit community in the nation. So many people became ill during the first part of December, 2003 that the city was virtually shut down. The entire school district in Malad was closed for three days in an effort to keep students from spreading the ailment. Roughly a third of the students became ill. Church services and Christmas festivities were also cancelled.

Malad City once had the oldest department store in the state of Idaho. Evans Co-op opened in 1865 as part of a Latter-day Saint movement in which local production and purchasing was encouraged through cooperatives. Though Evans is no more, the historic building remains. The city has undertaken efforts to renovate the building after the hardware store went out of business. Renovation is still underway. Malad City also has the longest running weekly newspaper in Idaho, called The Idaho Enterprise which published its first issue on June 6, 1879.

Because of its proximity to Utah, which has no state lottery, Malad has become a major retail site for the Idaho Lottery. The Top Stop Gasoline and Convenience store in Malad is responsible for 3 percent of Idaho's lottery sales, and the town as a whole accounts for over 19 percent of state sales. Only Boise, the state's largest city, has higher lotto sales. Over the 22-year history of the Idaho Lottery, it is estimated that Utahns have provided $54.1 million in lottery profits, which Idaho then uses for its own capital works and school funding.

== Geography ==
According to the United States Census Bureau, the city has a total area of 1.66 square miles (4.30 km^{2}), all of it land. It lies on the eastern edge of Malad Valley at 4,540 feet (1,380 m) in elevation.

The Wasatch fault runs along the east side of Malad Valley, and there are several active faults in the area to the south and west.

=== Climate ===
Malad City has a humid continental climate with warm summers (Köppen Dfb).

Climate data for Malad City, Idaho, 1991–2020 normals, extremes 1973–present
| Month | Jan | Feb | Mar | Apr | May | Jun | Jul | Aug | Sep | Oct | Nov | Dec | Year |
|---|---|---|---|---|---|---|---|---|---|---|---|---|---|
| Record high °F (°C) | 59 (15) | 64 (18) | 78 (26) | 85 (29) | 96 (36) | 102 (39) | 105 (41) | 104 (40) | 100 (38) | 90 (32) | 73 (23) | 63 (17) | 105 (41) |
| Mean maximum °F (°C) | 44.7 (7.1) | 50.8 (10.4) | 66.5 (19.2) | 77.1 (25.1) | 85.0 (29.4) | 93.1 (33.9) | 99.3 (37.4) | 97.1 (36.2) | 91.5 (33.1) | 79.9 (26.6) | 61.4 (16.3) | 48.6 (9.2) | 99.6 (37.6) |
| Mean daily maximum °F (°C) | 32.7 (0.4) | 38.4 (3.6) | 50.5 (10.3) | 59.5 (15.3) | 69.8 (21.0) | 79.7 (26.5) | 90.6 (32.6) | 88.4 (31.3) | 78.4 (25.8) | 62.7 (17.1) | 46.9 (8.3) | 33.9 (1.1) | 61.0 (16.1) |
| Daily mean °F (°C) | 23.6 (−4.7) | 28.4 (−2.0) | 38.5 (3.6) | 46.0 (7.8) | 54.6 (12.6) | 62.6 (17.0) | 71.0 (21.7) | 69.4 (20.8) | 59.9 (15.5) | 47.5 (8.6) | 35.1 (1.7) | 24.8 (−4.0) | 46.8 (8.2) |
| Mean daily minimum °F (°C) | 14.6 (−9.7) | 18.4 (−7.6) | 26.5 (−3.1) | 32.4 (0.2) | 39.4 (4.1) | 45.5 (7.5) | 51.3 (10.7) | 50.4 (10.2) | 41.4 (5.2) | 32.3 (0.2) | 23.4 (−4.8) | 15.7 (−9.1) | 32.6 (0.3) |
| Mean minimum °F (°C) | −4.5 (−20.3) | 0.4 (−17.6) | 11.0 (−11.7) | 18.9 (−7.3) | 25.7 (−3.5) | 32.9 (0.5) | 40.9 (4.9) | 39.9 (4.4) | 28.5 (−1.9) | 18.9 (−7.3) | 7.5 (−13.6) | −2.7 (−19.3) | −8.6 (−22.6) |
| Record low °F (°C) | −33 (−36) | −35 (−37) | −10 (−23) | 7 (−14) | 17 (−8) | 27 (−3) | 32 (0) | 26 (−3) | 18 (−8) | 3 (−16) | −18 (−28) | −32 (−36) | −35 (−37) |
| Average precipitation inches (mm) | 1.53 (39) | 1.25 (32) | 0.99 (25) | 1.24 (31) | 1.84 (47) | 0.73 (19) | 0.60 (15) | 0.70 (18) | 1.23 (31) | 1.15 (29) | 0.73 (19) | 1.11 (28) | 13.10 (333) |
| Average snowfall inches (cm) | 10.8 (27) | 5.7 (14) | 3.4 (8.6) | 0.9 (2.3) | 0.1 (0.25) | 0.0 (0.0) | 0.0 (0.0) | 0.0 (0.0) | 0.0 (0.0) | 0.3 (0.76) | 4.1 (10) | 8.7 (22) | 34.0 (86) |
| Average precipitation days (≥ 0.01 in) | 7.7 | 7.0 | 5.6 | 6.5 | 7.6 | 4.6 | 2.9 | 3.4 | 4.3 | 4.4 | 4.7 | 6.5 | 65.2 |
| Average snowy days (≥ 0.1 in) | 6.4 | 4.0 | 2.0 | 0.6 | 0.1 | 0.0 | 0.0 | 0.0 | 0.0 | 0.3 | 2.7 | 5.1 | 21.2 |
Source 1: NOAA (snow/snow days 1981–2010)
Source 2: National Weather Service

== Demographics ==
Historical population
| Census | Pop. | Note | %± |
|---|---|---|---|
| 1880 | 759 | | — |
| 1900 | 1,050 | | — |
| 1910 | 1,303 | | 24.1% |
| 1920 | 2,598 | | 99.4% |
| 1930 | 2,535 | | −2.4% |
| 1940 | 2,731 | | 7.7% |
| 1950 | 2,715 | | −0.6% |
| 1960 | 2,274 | | −16.2% |
| 1970 | 1,848 | | −18.7% |
| 1980 | 1,915 | | 3.6% |
| 1990 | 1,946 | | 1.6% |
| 2000 | 2,158 | | 10.9% |
| 2010 | 2,095 | | −2.9% |
| 2020 | 2,299 | | 9.7% |
U.S. Decennial Census

=== Racial and ethnic composition ===
Racial Makeup
| Race (NH = Non-Hispanic) | % 2020 | % 2010 | % 2000 | Pop. 2020 | Pop. 2010 | Pop. 2000 |
|---|---|---|---|---|---|---|
| White Alone (NH) | 93% | 94.7% | 96.8% | 2,137 | 1,983 | 2,090 |
| Black Alone (NH) | 0.1% | 0% | 0.1% | 2 | 0 | 3 |
| American Indian Alone (NH) | 0.3% | 0.4% | 0.3% | 7 | 9 | 6 |
| Asian Alone (NH) | 0% | 0.8% | 0.2% | 1 | 17 | 5 |
| Pacific Islander Alone (NH) | 0% | 0% | 0.1% | 1 | 1 | 2 |
| Other Race Alone (NH) | 0.1% | 0% | 0% | 2 | 0 | 0 |
| Multiracial (NH) | 2% | 1.1% | 0.6% | 46 | 24 | 12 |
| Hispanic (Any race) | 4.5% | 2.9% | 1.9% | 103 | 61 | 40 |

=== 2020 census ===
As of the 2020 census, Malad City had a population of 2,299 and 864 households. The median age was 38.3 years (39.2 for males and 37.9 for females). 28.2% of residents were under the age of 18, 30.9% were 19 years and younger, and 20.6% were 65 years of age or older. For every 100 females there were 92.5 males, and for every 100 females age 18 and over there were 93.8 males age 18 and over.

0.0% of residents lived in urban areas, while 100.0% lived in rural areas.

Of all households, 33.9% had children under the age of 18 living in them, 54.7% were married-couple households, 19.0% were households with a male householder and no spouse or partner present, and 23.0% were households with a female householder and no spouse or partner present. About 29.6% of all households were made up of individuals, and 16.2% had someone living alone who was 65 years of age or older.

There were 978 housing units, of which 11.7% were vacant. The homeowner vacancy rate was 2.7% and the rental vacancy rate was 11.9%.

The most common ancestries reported were English (39.1%), Welsh (11%), German (10.3%), Irish (7.8%), Scottish (5.2%), and Danish (4.6%).

=== 2010 census ===
As of the census of 2010, there were 2,095 people, 786 households, and 552 families residing in the city. The population density was 1,262.0 inhabitants per square mile (487.3/km^{2}). There were 893 housing units at an average density of 538.0 units per square mile (207.7 units/km^{2}). The racial makeup of the city was 96.5% White, 0.5% Native American, 0.8% Asian, 0.9% from other races, and 1.3% from two or more races. Hispanic or Latino of any race were 2.9% of the population.

There were 786 households, of which 34.7% had children under the age of 18 living with them, 58.7% were married couples living together, 8.0% had a female householder with no husband present, 3.6% had a male householder with no wife present, and 29.8% were non-families. 27.4% of all households were made up of individuals, and 14.1% had someone living alone who was 65 years of age or older. The average household size was 2.60 and the average family size was 3.21.

The median age in the city was 38.2 years. 29.1% of residents were under the age of 18; 6% were between the ages of 18 and 24; 21.4% were from 25 to 44; 25.6% were from 45 to 64; and 17.9% were 65 years of age or older. The gender makeup of the city was 49.4% male and 50.6% female.

=== 2000 census ===
As of the census of 2000, there were 2,158 people, 797 households, and 561 families residing in the city. The population density was 1,294.6 inhabitants per square mile (499.8/km^{2}). There were 908 housing units at an average density of 544.7 units per square mile (210.3 units/km^{2}). The racial makeup of the city was 98.01% White, 0.14% African American, 0.37% Native American, 0.23% Asian, 0.09% Pacific Islander, 0.56% from other races, and 0.60% from two or more races. Hispanic or Latino of any race were 1.85% of the population.

There were 797 households, out of which 34.3% had children under the age of 18 living with them, 61.5% were married couples living together, 6.3% had a female householder with no husband present, and 29.5% were non-families. 27.9% of all households were made up of individuals, and 16.8% had someone living alone who was 65 years of age or older. The average household size was 2.65 and the average family size was 3.24.

In the city, the population was spread out, with 29.9% under the age of 18, 7.1% from 18 to 24, 22.6% from 25 to 44, 20.0% from 45 to 64, and 20.4% who were 65 years of age or older. The median age was 38 years. For every 100 females, there were 92.7 males. For every 100 females age 18 and over, there were 92.2 males.

The median income for a household in the city was $32,235, and the median income for a family was $38,068. Males had a median income of $29,125 versus $19,338 for females. The per capita income for the city was $13,926. About 6.2% of families and 10.0% of the population were below the poverty line, including 9.7% of those under age 18 and 13.8% of those age 65 or over.

== Arts and culture ==
=== Annual cultural events ===
- Malad Welsh Festival

=== Museums and other points of interest ===
Oneida County Pioneer Museum – The building was constructed in 1914 by R.B. Davis and used as a drug store and for other business purposes until becoming home to the museum in 1992. The original safe and the original pressed-tin ceiling are still in good condition and are notable features of the museum.

=== Historic sites ===
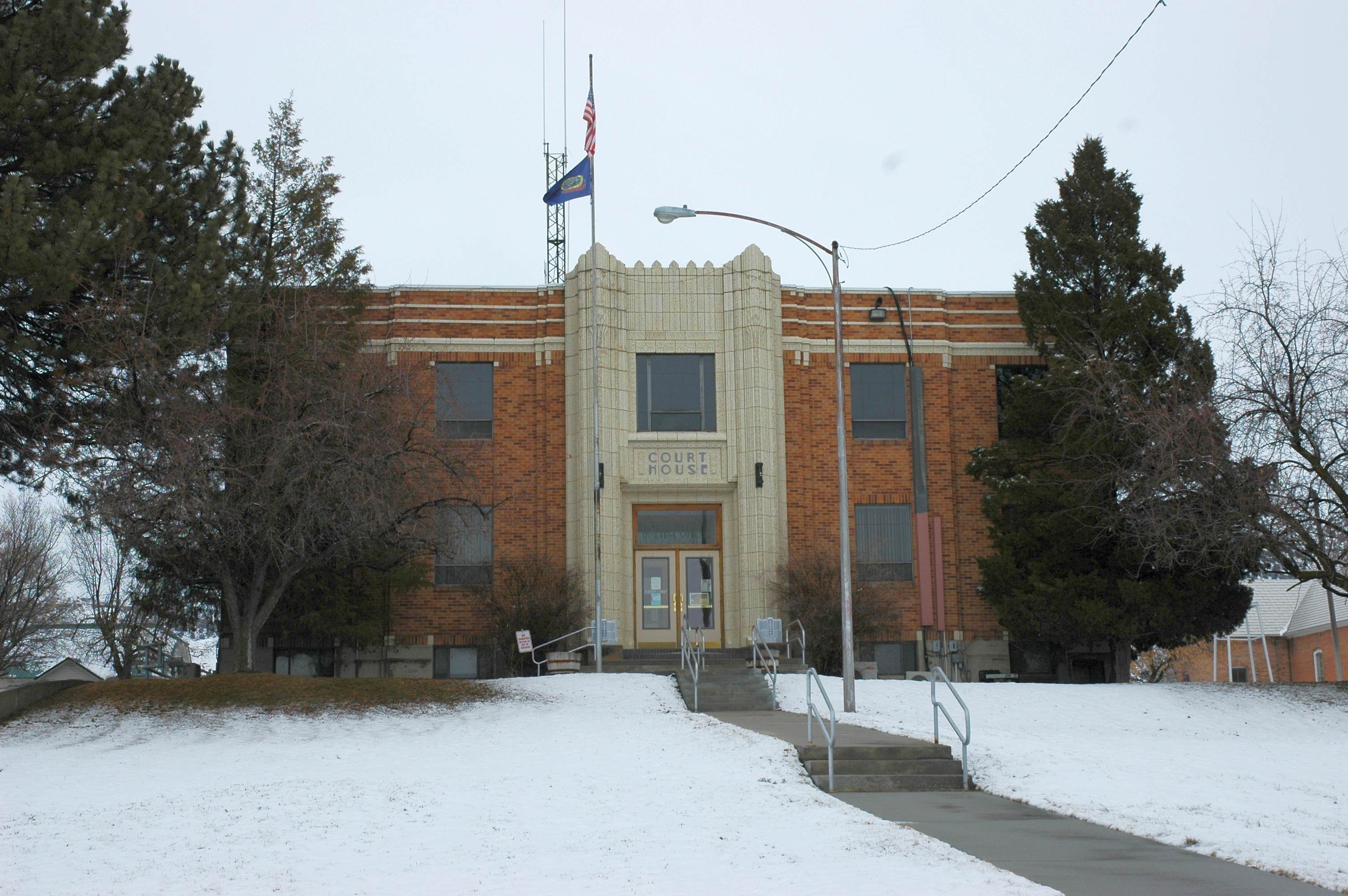
Oneida County Courthouse

Site listed on the National Register of Historic Places include:

- United Presbyterian Church
- D.L. Evans Sr. Bungalow
- Jedd Jones House
- Co-Op Block and J. N. Ireland Bank
- Second Ward Tabernacle

== Education ==
Malad is served by the PK-12 Oneida County School District 351. Malad's public schools include:

- Malad Elementary School
- Malad Middle School
- Malad High School

== Infrastructure ==
=== Highway ===
- Interstate 15
- Idaho State Highway 36
- Idaho State Highway 38

=== Healthcare ===
Malad is serviced by Nell J. Redfield Memorial Hospital (previously Oneida County Hospital) which has served Malad since 1925.

== Notable people ==
- LaDell Andersen - American college and professional basketball coach
- John V. Evans – Mayor, Idaho State Senator and Governor of Idaho; born in Malad.
- Mabel Jones Gabbott – Hymnal lyricist for LDS hymn book and poet; born in Malad.
- Ralph R. Harding – State and U.S. Representative; born in Malad.
- William Marion Jardine – U.S. Secretary of Agriculture and ambassador to Egypt
- Sonia Johnson – writer and activist
- Olive Davis Osmond – mother of the Osmonds
- William J. Rutter – Biochemist and co-founder of Chiron Corporation
- Darwin Thomas – Idaho Supreme Court Justice
- Jim Williams – basketball coach for Colorado State University
