= Pleasant Grove =

Pleasant Grove or Pleasant Groves may refer to:

== United States ==
- Pleasant Grove, Alabama, a city
- Pleasant Groves, Alabama, a town
- Pleasant Grove, California, an unincorporated community
- Pleasant Grove, Georgia, an unincorporated community
- Pleasant Grove Township, Coles County, Illinois
- Pleasant Grove, Illinois, an unincorporated community
- Pleasant Grove (Keene, Kentucky), listed on the National Register of Historic Places in Jessamine County, Kentucky
- Pleasant Grove, Maryland, an unincorporated community
- Pleasant Grove Township, Olmsted County, Minnesota
- Pleasant Grove, Missouri, a ghost town
- Pleasant Grove, Alamance County, North Carolina, an unincorporated community
- Pleasant Grove Camp Meeting Ground, Waxhaw, North Carolina
- Pleasant Grove, Ohio, a census-designated place
- Pleasant Grove, Belmont County, Ohio, an unincorporated community
- Pleasant Grove, Tennessee, an unincorporated community
- Pleasant Grove, Dallas, a community in Dallas, Texas
- Pleasant Grove (Halifax, Virginia), a historic home
- Pleasant Grove (Palmyra, Virginia), a historic home
- Pleasant Grove (Salem, Virginia), a historic home
- Pleasant Grove, Utah, a city
  - Pleasant Grove Historic District
