= Pleasant Grove Town Hall =

- U.S. National Register of Historic Places
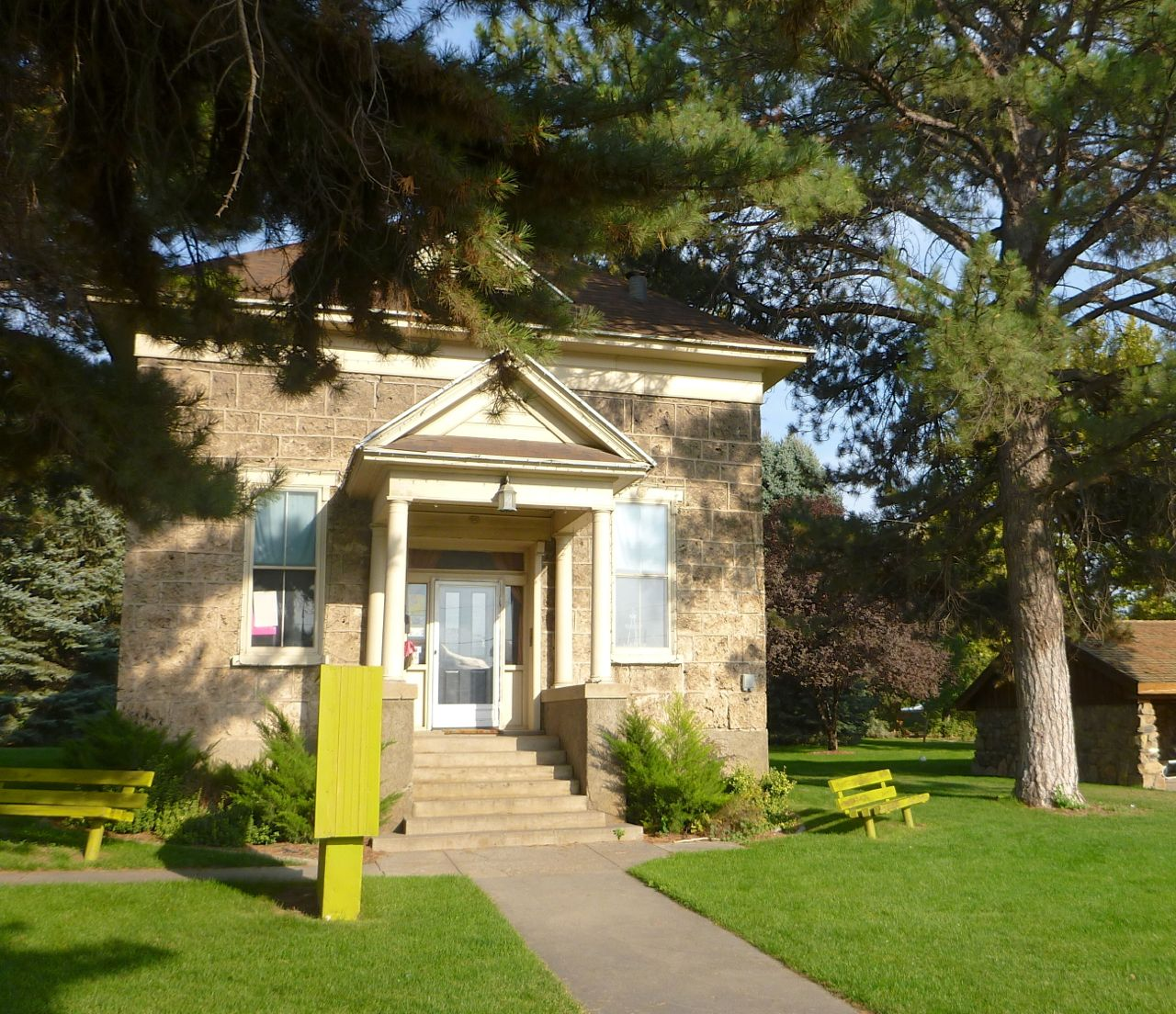
- The old town hall, September 2012

- Location within Utah Location within the United States
- Location: 107 South 100 East; Pleasant Grove, Utah; United States
- Coordinates: 40°21′44″N 111°44′15″W
- Area: less than one acre
- Built: 1887
- Built by: Andrew F Sundberg, N.P. Poulson Sr.
- Architectural style: Greek Revival, Vernacular Greek Revival
- MPS: Pleasant Grove Soft-Rock Buildings TR (AD)
- NRHP reference No.: 85001391
- Added to NRHP: June 27, 1985

The Pleasant Grove Town Hall is a historic former city hall in Pleasant Grove, Utah, United States, that is listed on the National Register of Historic Places.

== Description ==
The building is located at 107 South 100 East, within the Pleasant Grove Historic District, and was built in 1887.

In 1985 it was the second oldest and the best preserved public building in Pleasant Grove, and is one of about a dozen well-preserved buildings constructed of locally quarried soft, tufa rock in the town. Although originally built as a town hall, it was later used for other purposes including, from 1962, as town library.

It was listed on the National Register of Historic Places June 27, 1985.

== See also ==
- National Register of Historic Places listings in Utah County, Utah
