= Survivor: China =

- Season 15
- Region 1 DVD cover
- Presented by: Jeff Probst
- No. of days: 39
- No. of castaways: 16
- Winner: Todd Herzog
- Runner-up: Courtney Yates
- Location: Mount Lu West Sea, Jiujiang, China
- Fan Favorite: James Clement
- No. of episodes: 15

Release
- Original network: CBS
- Original release: September 20 – December 16, 2007

Additional information
- Filming dates: June 25 – August 2, 2007

Season chronology
- ← Previous; Fiji Next → Micronesia — Fans vs. Favorites

Survivor: China is the fifteenth season of the American CBS competitive reality television series Survivor. The premiere aired September 20, 2007. Host Jeff Probst claimed the show was the first full American TV series to be filmed entirely within China.

In the end, Todd Herzog won, defeating Courtney Yates and Amanda Kimmel by a vote of 4–2–1. Herzog became the second gay male winner after the first overall winner, Richard Hatch from Survivor: Borneo. During the reunion, James Clement was awarded a $100,000 prize as the most popular player in Survivor: China, beating fellow favorites Denise Martin and Peih-Gee Law.

== Format ==
Survivor is a reality television show based on the Swedish show Expedition Robinson, created by Mark Burnett and Charlie Parsons. The series follows a number of participants isolated in a remote location, where they must provide food, fire, and shelter. One participant is removed from the series by majority vote every three days, with challenges held to give a reward (ranging from living- and food-related prizes to a car) and immunity from being voted out of the series. The last remaining player receives a prize of $1,000,000.

== Contestants ==
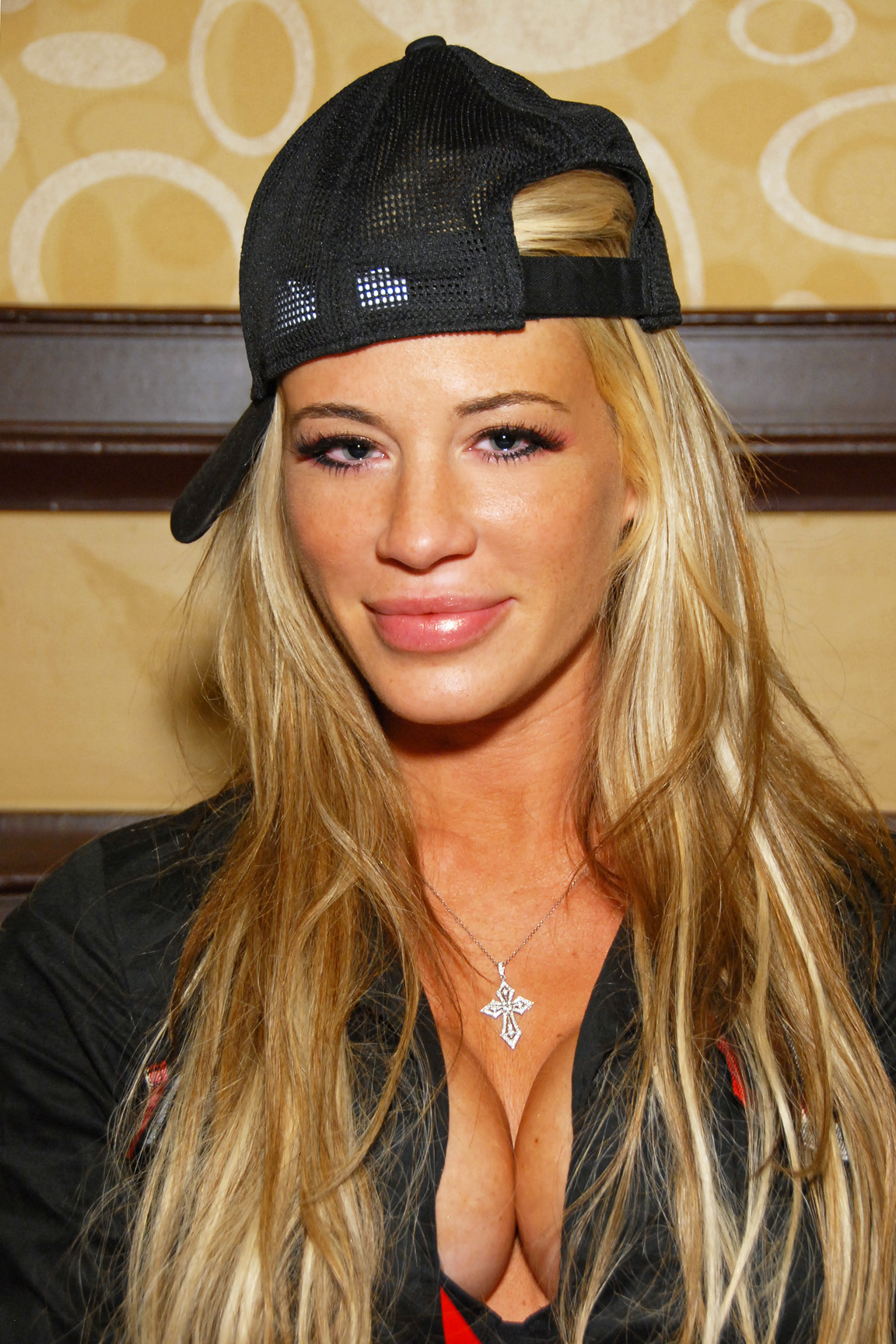
Ashley Massaro

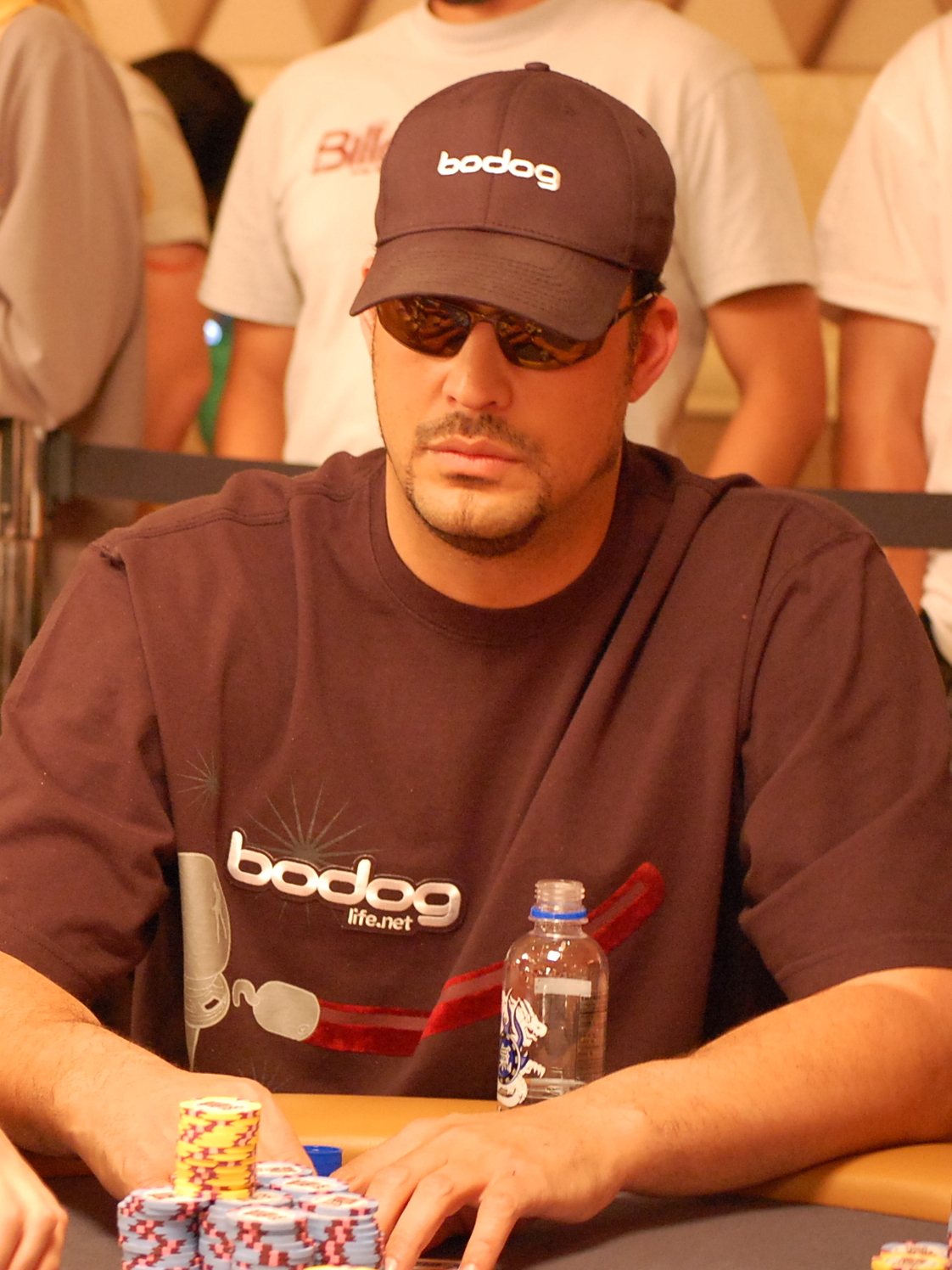
Jean-Robert Bellande

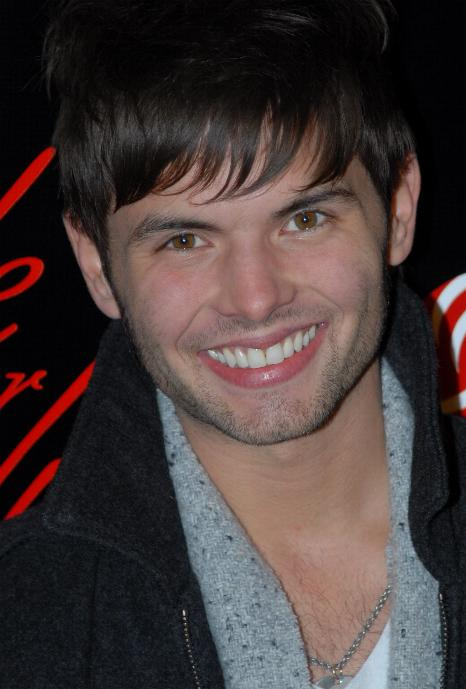
Todd Herzog

Season 15 features 16 new castaways, split into two tribes. The translation for Fei Long (飞龙) and Zhan Hu (战虎) mean Flying Dragon and Fighting Tiger respectively. The name of the merge tribe created by Peih-Gee Law, Hae Da Fung (黑打風), translates to Black Fighting Wind. Among the 16 contestants who competed in this season were poker player Jean-Robert Bellande and 2005 WWE Raw Diva Search winner Ashley Massaro.

List of Survivor: China contestants
Contestant	Age	From	Tribe			Finish	
Contestant	Age	From	Original	Switched	Merged	Placement	Day
Steve "Chicken" Morris	47	Marion, Virginia	Zhan Hu			1st voted out	Day 3
Ashley Massaro	28	East Northport, New York	Zhan Hu			2nd voted out	Day 6
Leslie Nease	38	Tega Cay, South Carolina	Fei Long			3rd voted out	Day 9
Dave Cruser	37	Simi Valley, California	Zhan Hu			4th voted out	Day 12
Aaron Reisberger	32	Venice, California	Fei Long	Zhan Hu		5th voted out	Day 15
Sherea Lloyd	26	Atlanta, Georgia	Zhan Hu	Fei Long		6th voted out	Day 18
Jaime Dugan	22	Columbia, South Carolina	Zhan Hu	Zhan Hu	Hae Da Fung	7th voted out 1st jury member	Day 21
Jean-Robert Bellande	36	Las Vegas, Nevada	Fei Long	Fei Long	Hae Da Fung	8th voted out 2nd jury member	Day 24
Michael "Frosti" Zernow	20	Chicago, Illinois	Zhan Hu	Fei Long	Hae Da Fung	9th voted out 3rd jury member	Day 27
James Clement	30	Lafayette, Louisiana	Fei Long	Zhan Hu	Hae Da Fung	10th voted out 4th jury member	Day 30
Erik Huffman	26	Nashville, Tennessee	Zhan Hu	Zhan Hu	Hae Da Fung	11th voted out 5th jury member	Day 33
Peih-Gee Law	29	Marina del Rey, California	Zhan Hu	Zhan Hu	Hae Da Fung	12th voted out 6th jury member	Day 36
Denise Martin	40	Douglas, Massachusetts	Fei Long	Fei Long	Hae Da Fung	13th voted out 7th jury member	Day 38
Amanda Kimmel	22	Los Angeles, California	Fei Long	Fei Long	Hae Da Fung	2nd runner-up	Day 39
Courtney Yates	26	New York City, New York	Fei Long	Fei Long	Hae Da Fung	Runner-up	Day 39
Todd Herzog	22	Pleasant Grove, Utah	Fei Long	Fei Long	Hae Da Fung	Sole Survivor	Day 39

=== Future appearances ===
James Clement and Amanda Kimmel both returned to compete in the following season, Survivor: Micronesia. The pair returned again in 2010 for Survivor: Heroes vs. Villains along with Courtney Yates. Peih-Gee Law returned for Survivor: Cambodia.

== Season summary ==
The season was filmed along the Zhelin Reservoir in China.

The two tribes, Fei Long and Zhan Hu, were predetermined prior to the start of the game. As an added bonus for winning reward challenges, the winning tribe was given the opportunity to kidnap a member from the losing tribe, where they would live at the winning tribe's camp (in cases where the reward is a trip away from camp, participate in the reward trip with the winning tribe as well) until the next Immunity Challenge. This person would receive a container with a clue to the hidden immunity idol that they had to give to one of the winning tribe members.

After the first 12 days, Fei Long held a slight edge thanks to the strength of James and leadership of Aaron. A strong alliance had been formed on Fei Long between Todd, Amanda, Aaron, and Courtney. On Day 14, each tribe, separately, selected two members of the other tribe to bring into theirs; Fei Long selected Sherea and Frosti, while Zhan Hu selected James and Aaron. Believing that James and Aaron would remain true to the other Fei Long members when the merge occurred, Jaime and Peih-Gee struck a plan to lose the next Immunity Challenge on purpose so that they would be able to remove the former Fei Longs from the game. Zhan Hu would end up losing the challenge, and subsequently voted Aaron out.

On Fei Long, Todd had been working to find the Hidden Immunity Idol. At the next reward challenge on Day 16, Fei Long won and kidnapped James. With the clue from James, Todd was able to find the idol, which he gave to James to use and eliminate a Zhan Hu, and also told James that the same clues would apply at the Zhan Hu camp. While James found the second idol, Zhan Hu won the next immunity challenge thus rendering Todd's plan moot and leaving James with both idols.

The tribes merged on Day 19, with the former Fei Longs holding a 6–4 advantage. After voting out Jaime, Jean-Robert and Frosti, Amanda became concerned that James would not give back one of the two idols, and worked with her other tribe members to blindside him, with James leaving the game with the two idols still in his possession. The remaining Fei Long held on to their lead, and Todd, Amanda, and Courtney's alliance held strong and the three went to the Final Tribal Council.

At the Final Tribal Council, all three finalists were criticized by the jury: Amanda for being overly apologetic, Courtney for her sassy attitude, and Todd for his deception and manipulating the jury. Amanda couldn't own her game and her moves and the jury believed that her game was attached to Todd's. Courtney was criticized for not making strategic moves in the game and personally attacking some of the jury members. Unlike Amanda and Courtney, Todd owned his strategic game to earn the jury's respect, leading to his victory in a 4-2-1 decision over Courtney and Amanda, respectively.

Challenge winners and eliminations by episode
Episode			Challenge winner(s)		Eliminated	
No.	Title	Original air date	Reward	Immunity	Tribe	Player
1	"A Chicken's a Little Bit Smarter"	September 20, 2007	Fei Long		Zhan Hu	Chicken
2	"My Mom Is Going to Kill Me!"	September 27, 2007	Fei Long	Fei Long	Zhan Hu	Ashley
3	"I Lost Two Hands and Possibly a Shoulder"	October 4, 2007	Zhan Hu	Zhan Hu	Fei Long	Leslie
4	"Ride the Workhorse Till the Tail Falls Off"	October 11, 2007	Fei Long	Fei Long	Zhan Hu	Dave
5	"Love Is In the Air"	October 18, 2007	None (Note: There was no reward challenge due to the tribe swap.)	Fei Long	Zhan Hu	Aaron
6	"That's Love, Baby! It Makes You Strong!"	October 25, 2007	Fei Long	Zhan Hu	Fei Long	Sherea
7	"I'm Not As Dumb As I Look"	November 1, 2007	None (Note: There was no reward challenge due to the merge.)	Frosti	Hae Da Fung	Jaime
8	"High School Friend Contest"	November 8, 2007	Amanda, James, Jean-Robert, Todd	Courtney	Hae Da Fung	Jean-Robert
9	"Just Don't Eat the Apple"	November 15, 2007	Amanda, Courtney, Erik, Frosti	Peih-Gee	Hae Da Fung	Frosti
10	"It's Been Real and It's Been Fun"	November 22, 2007	Recap Episode			
11	"Ready to Bite the Apple"	November 29, 2007	Peih-Gee [Denise, Erik]	Erik	Hae Da Fung	James
12	"Going for the Oscar"	December 6, 2007	Denise [Amanda, Todd]	Peih-Gee	Hae Da Fung	Erik
13	"Hello, I'm Still a Person"	December 13, 2007	Denise [Courtney, Todd]	Amanda	Hae Da Fung	Peih-Gee
14	"A Slippery Little Sucker"	December 16, 2007	Amanda [Todd]	Amanda	Hae Da Fung	Denise
15	"The Reunion"	December 16, 2007				

In the case of multiple tribes or castaways who win reward or immunity, they are listed in order of finish, or alphabetically where it was a team effort; where one castaway won and invited others, the invitees are in brackets.

== Episodes ==
No. overall	No. in season	Title	Original release date	U.S. viewers (millions)	Rating/share (18-49)
215	1	"A Chicken's a Little Bit Smarter"	September 20, 2007	15.35	9.0/15
The castaways began in downtown Shanghai and traveled by train and truck to a Buddhist Temple where they participated in a welcoming ceremony. Even though Jeff stated that the ceremony was not religious, Leslie left before the ceremony was done because she felt the ceremony was symbolic of worship, which appeared to conflict with her Christian beliefs. After the ceremony, Jeff announced to the castaways that they would be going into the game with only the clothes that they were wearing at the time. The castaways were then divided into two tribes, each tribe receiving a copy of Sun Tzu's The Art of War. After a stormy night at Zhan Hu, Ashley became ill, which put her on the spot as a target for elimination.: Reward/Immunity Challenge: Each tribe is to maneuver a Chinese dragon puppet, held on poles individually by each tribe member, through a maze, with the lead runner for each tribe having to open some obstacles along the way, such as lowering drawbridges and unlocking a locked gate. At the end of the course, the tribe members are to match their poles with correct spots in the ground. The winning tribe is the first to complete this task and will win immunity and flint.; At the first challenge, the race began with the tribes trudging through the muddy course, maneuvering side-by-side as they make their way to the locked gate. Frosti and James were neck-and-neck as they catapulted themselves over the walls. But when Frosti forgot to lower the drawbridge and had to go back, he gave James from Fei Long a narrow lead. Carrying the awkward and heavy mascots, both tribes made their way through the waist deep swamp. Fei Long reached he finish platform first. They started on their puzzle as the swamp slowed the Zhan Hu tribe. Zhan Hu did not catch up and Fei Long solved the puzzle, winning flint and Immunity. At Tribal Council, several contestants were up for elimination; Peih-Gee's bossy attitude, Ashley appeared to be a weak link after getting sick with diarrhea, and Chicken was seen as not fitting in. In the end Chicken was voted out 5-2-1. After Chicken left, Probst presented the tribe with fire in the form of a flint.
216	2	"My Mom Is Going to Kill Me!"	September 27, 2007	14.15	8.3/14
Dave tried to take a leadership role at Zhan Hu, but his tribemates resisted him for being too controlling and not listening to their ideas. At Fei Long, Amanda and Todd formed an alliance and pulled in Aaron to be "someone strong to call the shots" to deflect any anger about their plotting during the game. Jean-Robert became a target due to his laziness, but he privately revealed that this negative perception was part of his game plan. Probst revealed at the Reward Challenge that in addition to the reward, there will be a twist announced at the end of the challenge.: Reward Challenge: In a series of 3-on-3 matches, each tribe has to push their large ball across a muddy field into their opponents' goal, while preventing the opponents from doing the same. The first tribe to score two goals wins fishing gear and a fishing boat.; In the first round, Amanda, Denise and Aaron of Fei Long raced out into the mud to battle Jaime, Sherea and Erik of Zhan Hu. Both sides choked and wrestled each other to gain possession of the wooden balls, and Sherea pulled Amanda’s top down. Despite the clothing malfunction, Amanda maneuvered the giant ball across the line and scored the first point for Fei Long. In the next round, Ashley, Frosti and Dave of Zhan Hu took on Jean-Robert, James and Leslie of Fei Long. Calling on her professional wrestling skills, Ashley attempted to grapple with the heavier Jean-Robert. Jean-Robert dragged Ashley along behind him and took out Frosti, leaving James free and clear to score the winning point for Fei Long. The twist was that Fei Long was to kidnap a member of Zhan Hu who would stay with them until the next immunity challenge. Fei Long opted to kidnap Jaime as she was seen as a "spot of sunshine" and thought her being gone from Zhan Hu would be demoralizing. Probst gave Jaime a sealed bamboo tube with instructions to be opened in private once at the Fei Long camp. Jaime opened the sealed bamboo tube to reveal a second, smaller bamboo tube containing a clue to the Hidden Immunity Idol which must be given to a member of Fei Long without opening it before rejoining her tribe at the next immunity challenge. Jaime gave the sealed clue to the Hidden Immunity Idol at Fei Long to Leslie, seeing her as the weakest member of Fei Long. Leslie then shared the clue with Todd thinking that he would trust her and keep her around, but he saw this an opportunity to have the clue to himself if she were to be eliminated.: Immunity Challenge: Each tribe uses a puzzle log to break through two sets of gates; then, they must turn, pull and push the puzzle log to navigate a maze that is worked into the surface of the log. Once the log is cleared from the maze station, the first tribe to use their log to hit a gong at the end of the course wins immunity.; Both tribes plowed through their first gates with their heavy puzzle log. James and Jean-Robert muscled the Fei Long log through the second gate and headed to their puzzle station, as Zhan Hu’s over-worked Dave could barely lift his part of the log. In a split-second decision, Frosti switched positions with Dave in order to catch up for the lost time and finally broke through the second gate. However, it was too little, too late for Zhan Hu as Fei Long conquered their puzzle and rung their gong in victory. Once again, Fei Long avoided attending the dreaded Tribal Council. Dave took full responsibility for Zhan Hu's immunity challenge loss. But the tribe saw Ashley as causing too much conflict with Dave and not being a hard enough worker, causing her to be unanimously voted out.
217	3	"I Lost Two Hands and Possibly a Shoulder"	October 4, 2007	14.14	8.5/14
On the same night Zhan Hu attended the second Tribal Council on Night 6, Jean-Robert hogs up the Fei Long bed space which caused Courtney, Leslie and Amanda to switch spots in order to avoid getting snuggled by him. Another conflict at Fei Long saw Aaron, James and Jean-Robert arguing what to do with a crab James and Courtney caught. Dave continued to work hard at Zhan Hu but also continued to irritate his tribemates for his bossy manner. At Fei Long, Courtney and Todd overheard Jean-Robert and James strategizing and making crude comments about Courtney.: Reward Challenge: In a series of 3-on-3 matches (separated by gender) taking place on two tribe-colored floating ships attached via two separate planks, each tribe must attempt to wrestle each member of the other tribe into the water; the first tribe to do so wins that match. The game is played best 3 out of 5 matches with the winning tribe receiving a kerosene lamp, rope, blankets, pillows, and a tarp.; At the reward challenge, Dave attempted to distract Fei Long's male members by doing the wrestling challenge completely naked. However, the competitors from Fei Long were unaffected and proceeded to defeat the males both times they battled. Unfortunately, for the male Fei Long members, the women failed to win leaving the score 3-2 with Zhan Hu achieving victory. After winning their first reward challenge, Zhan Hu chose to kidnap Leslie from Fei Long seeing her as "genuine." Leslie gave the sealed clue to the Hidden Immunity Idol at Zhan Hu to Jaime, repaying the favor from the prior episode. Jaime suspected that the idol was right in front of her after reading the clue, but was not able to locate it.: Immunity Challenge: Four members of each tribe, sequentially, must use a machete to chop through wooden beams and ropes to release a set of puzzle disks. Once all four sets of puzzle disks are collected for the tribe, two other members must assemble the disks onto a large post on a heavy stone base. Once all disks are assembled on the post correctly, the two puzzle solves must then drag it across the finish line. The first tribe to drag the completed puzzle across the finish line wins immunity.; At the immunity challenge, Zhan Hu got an early lead as Jamie, Peih-Gee, Frosti, and Erik tackled the post chopping with ease. On the other side, Fei Long was having trouble because Courtney couldn't cut fast enough, therefore she had to resort to sawing through the ropes at her station. After finally retrieving their first bundle of puzzle disks; Amanda, Aaron, and James blew through the other posts easily. Jean-Robert and Todd worked on Fei Long's puzzle while Dave and Sherea worked on Zhan Hu's. Fei Long was working quickly until Jean-Robert put a disk on the post too quickly blocking Todd's view, and causing the disk to become stuck. Zhan Hu; who was ahead, calmly finished the puzzle and dragged it across the finish line, thus winning their first immunity challenge. At Fei Long, Leslie was seen as untrustworthy due to her potential ties to the other tribe after being kidnapped, particularly after telling her tribe that Zhan Hu was a more cohesive and fun tribe than they were, and she was voted out.
218	4	"Ride the Workhorse Till the Tail Falls Off"	October 11, 2007	14.22	8.6/14
At Zhan Hu, Peih-Gee and Frosti discovered that there was mould in the tribe's rice supply. Frosti spoke to Dave privately and tried to warn him that he was causing too much conflict around camp after he clashed with Sherea over Sherea sifting their rice supply to hand pick the good ones and her throwing away shells Dave collected to take home for his mother.: Reward Challenge: Two members of each tribe, at a time, must use a pair of large chopsticks to carry a burning metal ball across the length of the course and then to place it onto a chute, where it will roll down and ignite a fireworks display. The chopsticks would get longer in each round making it more difficult to carry the metal ball. The first tribe to successfully transport three balls in this way wins a visit by a local fisherman and his family the next day. The fisherman would teach the tribe how to fish, and would bring additional food for the tribe.; The reward challenge was won by Fei Long. Jean-Robert surprised his tribe by revealing that he spoke Mandarin, which he learned as a child while spending a few years in Taiwan and, during the visit by a local fisherman and his family as part of the Reward, was able to serve as a translator between the fisherman's family and the other contestants. Dave was kidnapped by Fei Long and chose to give the Hidden Immunity Idol clue to Todd after Todd agreed to return the favor should he be kidnapped.: Immunity Challenge: The tribes are dressed in mock Chinese armor for the challenge for their own protection. Two members of each tribe, at a time, attempt to use meteor hammers to break several pots arranged behind the opposing tribe while defending the opponents from breaking their own using large staves to block the hammers. The challenge is played in three rounds, the first round is played with two women from each tribe, the second is played with two men from each tribe and the third and final round is played with one man and one woman from each tribe. Each opposing pot broken scores a point for the tribe. The tribe that breaks the most pots after three rounds receives immunity.; Fei Long won the Immunity Challenge. After returning to camp, Dave noticed that his tribe was united against him and tried to convince his tribemates that his attitude had changed. Sherea overheard Erik, Frosti, Jaime and Peih-Gee discussing her lack of work and realized that she was in danger of being voted out. Ultimately, the four other members of Zhan Hu decided that Dave's abrasive and miserable attitude was too much, and he was unanimously voted out.
219	5	"Love Is In the Air"	October 18, 2007	14.03	8.5/13
Erik and Jaime's relationship grew, and Jaime shared the clues she had about the Hidden Immunity Idol with him. Instead of a Reward Challenge, local fishermen dropped off messages instructing each tribe to select the two strongest members from the other tribe to be added to their own; Fei Long selected Frosti and Sherea while Zhan Hu selected Aaron and James. Along with their new tribe members, each tribe received a basket of fruits, nuts, and wine. The tribal switch caused a lot of plotting of potential future moves by the castaways: Jean-Robert trying to regain the trust of his tribe; Frosti looking for new alliances, and Peih-Gee and Jaime contemplating throwing the next two Immunity Challenges in order to eliminate Aaron and James thus potentially balancing the number of original tribe members should a merge happen with ten players remaining.: Immunity Challenge: Two members of each tribe must dive down from a floating platform to remove sticks that are trapping twelve buoyant puzzle disks, representing the twelve animals in the Chinese Zodiac. Once the members have collected all twelve, they must place the disks in their tribe boat and row the boat to shore to deliver the pieces to three other members of their tribe, who must then place them to match notches on a puzzle board. The first tribe to complete the puzzle wins Immunity.; At the Immunity Challenge, Aaron and Erik gave Zhan Hu the lead by arriving on shore with the puzzle pieces first, but Jaime and Peih-Gee sabotaged their tribe's chances by tossing a puzzle piece behind the puzzle board and making minimal effort to solve the puzzle, allowing Fei Long to catch up and win immunity for a fourth time. Aaron and James were upset at Jaime and Peih-Gee's poor performance and seeming lack of concern during the challenge. Back at camp, Erik was surprised to learn that the girls purposely threw the challenge and felt compelled to go along with their plan to stay in the game. At Tribal Council, Jaime admitted to throwing the challenge, prompting disgust from both Aaron and James. James was very vocal in condemning the strategy, even asking to be sent home. The remaining Zhan Hu members felt that Aaron would be a bigger threat because of this later on and voted him out.
220	6	"That's Love, Baby! It Makes You Strong!"	October 25, 2007	14.19	8.5/14
Todd teamed up with Amanda to find the Hidden Immunity Idol, sharing his knowledge of the clues with her.: Reward Challenge: One member of each tribe at a time will search an abandoned Chinese village for colored planks containing letters on them. When all eight planks are collected, the tribe must arrange the planks into a large board where other letters are already written and masking some letters on the planks to complete a proverb made famous by Confucius. The first tribe to complete the proverb (The journey of a thousand miles begins with a single step) wins a trip to a nearby tea house to bathe, eat, and relax.; During the Reward Challenge, Peih-Gee tried to relay a message to Sherea about the strategy she and Jaime had devised, but when Sherea and Frosti were non-communicative, Peih-Gee, Jaime, and Erik began to doubt their plans. Fei Long won the reward challenge and kidnapped their former tribemate James who also joined them on the reward. While on the reward, Todd convinced James to give him the Hidden Immunity Idol clue with a promise to save James in return. Back at camp, Peih-Gee, Jaime and Erik grew concern about their old tribemates and agreed that they needed to win the next Immunity Challenge. With the clue, Amanda and Todd discovered the location of the Hidden Immunity Idol attached to the paifang at the camp's entrance. They attempted to retrieve it discreetly by pretending their main objective was dismantling the paifang, but were forced to reveal the idol to Frosti after he innocently came over to help them. Todd then gave the idol to James and told him how to find the idol at the Zhan Hu camp. Todd also told Denise and Courtney about the Hidden Immunity Idol and his plan for Fei Long to win the next Immunity Challenge. Amanda's and Todd's plot would require James to play the Hidden Immunity Idol on himself at Tribal Council, thus negating all votes against him, and eliminate Jaime with his sole vote.: Immunity Challenge: Tribes are challenged to eat "traditional" Chinese dishes such as 10 chicken hearts, 3 eels, 3 baby turtles (still with their shell), 2 balute, and one "1,000 year old" egg in a series of 1-on-1 matches. The first person to finish the food item and show Probst an empty mouth scores a point for their tribe. The first tribe to score four points wins Immunity.; Despite the best efforts by the Fei Long tribe to win and James to help throw the food eating Immunity Challenge, Zhan Hu won immunity forcing Fei Long to vote someone out. The alliance of Todd, Amanda, Denise, and Courtney agreed that they could trust Frosti and would vote out Sherea. After thinking more about it, Courtney tried to convince them to vote out Jean-Robert due to her dislike of him. Todd and Amanda were torn on whom to trust, but they stuck to their original plan after a tense Tribal Council, and Sherea was voted out.
221	7	"I'm Not As Dumb As I Look"	November 1, 2007	14.44	8.5/14
James retrieved the Hidden Immunity Idol from the Zhan Hu paifang after Peih-Gee left to join Jaime and Erik at the river. The other members of Zhan Hu noticed that the paifang was different, prompting them to pick up a false plaque James removed from the other side of the paifang. Later, Jaime searched James' bag and discovered he had two plaques hidden in his pants. She did not actually see the plaques, and thus did not realize the plaque she had was a false Idol. Courtney continued her push to get Jean-Robert voted out, irritating Todd who felt the need to keep Jean-Robert to maintain Fei Long's majority. On day 20, the tribes were merged, after which they enjoyed a feast of food and alcohol, while being entertained by Chinese acrobats. The merged castaways named their new tribe Hae Da Fung (Black Fighting Wind). Jeff arrived at the campsite and announced an Immunity Challenge would take place immediately.: Immunity Challenge: The players must recall information that was visible at the feast they attended after the merge. If a player incorrectly answered a question, that player would be eliminated from the challenge. The last remaining player would win Immunity.; The Immunity Challenge was won by Frosti. Peih-Gee tried to bring James and Frosti to the former Zhan Hu's side while Jaime tried to use her knowledge of the Hidden Immunity Idols as a bargaining chip with Frosti and Todd to save herself, but both already knew she had a false Idol and James had the real ones. After the votes were cast at Tribal Council, Jaime tried to play her false Hidden Immunity Idol, but Jeff tossed the plaque into the fire after announcing that it was not a Hidden Immunity Idol. The votes cast against Jaime counted and she was voted out.
222	8	"High School Friend Contest"	November 8, 2007	14.86	8.7/14
Reward Challenge: The tribe was divided into two teams of four via schoolyard pick (Jean-Robert, James, Todd, and Amanda versus Peih-Gee, Frosti, Erik and Courtney), with the ninth player (Denise) unable to participate or qualify for reward. During each match, one member of the team is positioned in a boat in the center of a floating platform and must prevent the boat from being flooded by three members of the other team standing on the platform to outlast the fourth member of the other tribe doing the same in a separate area. The team that sinks the other team's boat first wins the match; the game is played to the best 2 of 3 matches with the winner receiving a Chinese feast and a scroll containing the final clue to the Hidden Immunity Idol at camp.; As part of winning the reward challenge, Amanda, James, Jean-Robert and Todd received a scroll containing all the clues and an additional clue to the whereabouts of the Hidden Immunity Idol at camp. With his new knowledge about the Hidden Immunity Idol, Jean-Robert searched the remaining wooden plaques at the campsite for the Idol, not knowing that both Idols had already been found. Todd, feeling slighted by James having both Hidden Immunity Idols and not giving one to him, approached Amanda and Frosti about blindsiding James at Tribal Council.: Immunity Challenge: Each player sits atop a large barrel filled with water, fashioned as a Chinese dragon; at the start of the challenge, the players will release a cork that will cause water to drain out of the barrel, and furthermore, will unlatch the barrel as to allow it to rotate freely. Players must then attempt to stay atop the barrel for as long as possible, with balancing becoming more difficult as the water drains from the barrel. The players can only touch their own barrel with their hands. If they touched the other parts of the structure with their hands or if they fall off their barrel, they would be eliminated from the challenge. The last player that remains on their barrel wins Immunity.; Courtney won the immunity challenge. Thinking that he had the Hidden Immunity Idol, Jean-Robert told Erik that he had the Idol, but Erik told him that he thought James had both of them. Jean-Robert confronted James about the Idols hoping to get an alliance with him, but James denied that he had it. Jean-Robert then approached Todd about blindsiding James, which caused Todd to alter his plan to do the same. However, he changed his mind and formed an alliance with James, Amanda, Courtney, and Frosti. They decided not to tell Denise due to her wavering friendship. Fearing that Jean-Robert might overthrow him as the strategy guy of the game, Todd turned the majority Fei Long alliance to Jean-Robert who was voted out.
223	9	"Just Don't Eat the Apple"	November 15, 2007	14.68	8.9/14
Denise felt betrayed by her alliance after they did not tell her about their plan to vote out Jean-Robert at the last Tribal Council. Frosti and Courtney flirted with each other.: Reward Challenge: Two teams of four are selected via schoolyard pick (Amanda, Courtney, Erik, and Frosti vs. Todd, Denise, James, and Peih-Gee). Each team must attempt to bounce a ball on the heads of four drums along the length of a course including across two gates, and into a pot at the end of course; if the ball should drop to the ground the team must restart at the last gate passed or back at the start. The first team to transfer three balls in this fashion wins a night on a river cruise along the Lishui River.; Amanda, Courtney, Erik, and Frosti won the reward challenge. Peih-Gee took out her frustration at losing the Reward Challenge on James, saying that he quit on the challenge when he had a hard time with it. She later attempted to apologize to James for what she said, but he didn't accept. When the winners got back from the reward challenge, they attempted to downplay their reward in order to not alienate the other castaways.: Immunity Challenge: Each player is presented with a set of tiles representing the animals of the Chinese zodiac. Each round, Probst will read off a series of animals in a specific order; the players must remember this series and then using a knife, stab the tiles in the correct order. A player is eliminated from the challenge if they fail to get the correct order of animals. The last player remaining in the challenge would win immunity. Prior to the challenge, players that do not want to participate are able to partake of cheeseburgers, french fries, and drinks for as long as the challenge continues or until the food runs out before the end of the challenge. The decision to participate in the challenge or not is determined by a simultaneous reveal of each player's choice through colored coins. If the player wants to eat, they would reveal the black coin. If the player wants to participate, they would reveal the white coin.; Courtney, Denise, James and Todd chose to sit out the Immunity Challenge to eat. Erik was first out, followed by Amanda. Frosti answered the final question incorrectly and Peih-Gee won Immunity. Todd, James, and Denise were concerned that Courtney would not vote for Frosti due to her close friendship with him. Seen as a greater threat to win challenges than Erik and as a possible threat to turn Courtney to his side, Frosti was unanimously voted out. After the vote, Jeff told the remaining contestants that they are not going directly back to camp and that they had to stay at Tribal Council to attend to some additional business.
224	10	"It’s Been Real and It's Been Fun"	November 22, 2007	11.58	3.6/
A recap of the first 27 days including previously unaired bonus footage.
225	11	"Ready to Bite the Apple"	November 29, 2007	13.57	8.3/13
The surprise "more business to attend to" announced by Jeff at Tribal Council was a Reward Challenge held immediately at Tribal Council itself.: Reward Challenge: The players are quizzed on their knowledge of China and its culture. The player to first five correct answers wins Reward as well as the opportunity to bring two others along on a plane trip to the Shaolin Temple, including a demonstration of martial arts and an overnight stay.; Peih-Gee won the challenge without answering a question incorrectly and invited Denise and Erik to join her on the reward. While at the temple, Denise surprised Peih-Gee and Erik by revealing that she has been a student of karate for eight years, nearly reaching the rank of black belt. While fetching the tree mail announcing the Immunity Challenge, Amanda shared with Courtney her plot to blindside James at the next Tribal Council as long as he did not win immunity at the challenge.: Immunity Challenge: Players are to throw hira-shuriken (steel stars with sharp points) at a target wall marked with various scoring areas (1, 2, 3 and 5 points). In the first round, each player throws three times, and the highest four scores (barring any ties) proceed to the next round. In the second round, the target wall is moved farther away by ten feet (3.0 m), and each player only has one throw. The player with the highest scoring throw on the second round wins Immunity.; At the immunity challenge, Courtney, Erik, Amanda and James all scored 6 points and moved on to the final round. Erik won the Immunity Challenge with a score of 3 points to Amanda's 2 and Courtney and James missing the target in the final round. Amanda convinced Todd and Denise to go along with her plot to blindside James. Thinking that she was next to go and trying to go out fighting, Peih-Gee talked to Amanda about James possibly having a Hidden Immunity Idol and Amanda told Peih-Gee to "just not do anything." Peih-Gee shared the possible plot with Erik, who had to decide if it was in his best interest to vote with Peih-Gee and vote for Todd or join the possible plot by voting out James. James was blindsided at Tribal Council without playing either Hidden Immunity Idol, and was voted out.
226	12	"Going for the Oscar"	December 6, 2007	14.05	8.2/13
Reward Challenge: Each remaining contestant was teamed with a loved one for this challenge. Each participant was blindfolded and placed on opposite sides of a maze formed by fenceposts. The contestant and their loved one had to help meet at the center and step up onto a dais to win the reward. The first pair to step up onto the dais wins a boat trip including a dinner feast and a call from home; selection of two other contestants and their loved ones to share in the boat trip and feast.; At the Reward Challenge, the castaways were surprised by the appearance of their loved ones (Amanda's sister, Courtney's father, Denise's husband, Erik's mother, Peih-Gee's father and Todd's sister) with whom they teamed up in the challenge. The team of Denise and her husband won, and selected Amanda and Todd, along with their sisters, to join them on the trip. After Courtney, Erik, and Peih-Gee were sent away, Jeff announced the remaining loved ones would spend the night at the camp.: Immunity Challenge: Each contestant is tethered to a rope that crosses a knee-deep bog of water and included various posts which the rope is wrapped around. Each contestant must maneuver the length of the rope including around any obstacles to reach a set of question boxes, each containing one true and one false statement related to Chinese inventions and a key associated with that answer. The contestant selects the key from the answer they believe to be true and makes their way back through the course to try to use the key to unlock one of three locks on a box containing the flag. If they are wrong, they must go back and fetch the other key. The first player to open all three boxes and hoist their flag wins.; The grueling Immunity Challenge was won by Peih-Gee. Peih-Gee and Erik tried to get Denise to switch to their side to force a tie at Tribal Council by voting for Todd, but the Fei Long alliance held and Erik, as the only remaining member of the former Zhan Hu who wasn't immune, was voted out.
227	13	"Hello, I'm Still a Person"	December 13, 2007	13.86	8.7/14
Reward Challenge: Each player is given 5 arrows of their color, and must secretly distribute them to the other players by placing them in their containers. They cannot place any of their arrows in their own container. Then, using the arrows that they have been given, they must use a replica of a Chinese wooden repeating crossbow to shoot at their names at a checkerboard target. A player earns a point whenever an arrow hit their name, regardless of who shot the arrow. The winner is the one with the most points after all arrows are fired and receives a private jet trip to the Great Wall of China, including a meal; selection of two other contestants to share the reward with them.; Denise won the reward challenge due to Amanda and Courtney hitting her name instead of their own. She then chose to take Courtney and she chose Todd for strategic reasons, leaving a teary-eyed and furious Peih-Gee (she shared her Shaolin Monks reward with Denise, but after Denise's two straight reward wins, she had not returned the favor). Back at camp, Amanda and Peih-Gee started to talk, resolved their conflicts with each other and became somewhat close. Amanda flirted with the idea of blindsiding Todd. Later, when the others returned to camp, Peih-Gee attempted to get Denise to vote along with her and Amanda, telling Denise that she would be voted out once Peih-Gee was eliminated.: Immunity Challenge: This was the "Second Chances" challenge split into four rounds, with the last player in each round losing the challenge. The reappearing challenges were: using 3 throwing stars to earn points, eating one balut, bouncing a ball on a drum across a course into a large container, and finally using a sword to chop ropes holding eight puzzle disks, then assembling the puzzle on a large post. The first person of the two in the final round to assemble the puzzle correctly wins immunity.; The Immunity Challenge was won by Amanda. At Tribal Council, Amanda and Denise decided to keep their allegiance with Todd; and Peih-Gee, the last original Zhan Hu member, was voted out.
228	14	"A Slippery Little Sucker"	December 16, 2007	15.18	8.5/13
Reward Challenge: Players must cross over two bridges (once which they have to assemble by placing planks in correct positions on the bridge) to reach a yoke and 12 puzzle pieces. Using the yoke to haul the pieces, the player must then take these to the top of a replica Great Wall. Once all the pieces are collected at the top of the wall, the player must then fill the pieces into a three-dimension puzzle in order to complete their section of the wall. The first place to complete the puzzle correctly wins pizza, brownies, beer, and soft drinks. The winner can choose to eat the food in the reward themselves, or share it with one or two of the other players.; At the final Reward Challenge, Amanda won a food reward challenge. Given the choices of having the reward herself, sharing it with one person or sharing it with two people, she chose to split it with only Todd. While eating their reward, Amanda questioned Todd's loyalty to their alliance and he reassured her that he was true to their alliance with Courtney. The Immunity Challenge was preceded by a torch remembrance of the voted out castaways that ended at a statue of Guan Yin.: Immunity Challenge: Each player is provided a one-arm balance adjusted for their height, with a small disk at the far end. During the challenge, Probst will call out specific dishware that the player must take and stack on the far end of the balance. Should any part of a player's stack fall, that player is out of the challenge. The last player remaining in the challenge would win immunity.; Amanda continued her winning streak by winning the final Immunity Challenge. During the challenge, Denise tried to convince Amanda to drop out and hand Denise immunity in exchange for a promise Denise wouldn't vote her out. Amanda told Denise to forget it and won Immunity for herself. After the challenge, Denise continued her lobbying to not be voted out and finally decided to move against Todd, but her efforts were unsuccessful and she was voted out in a unanimous vote. At the Final Tribal Council, all the three were confronted by the jury for their actions during the course of 39 days. Amanda was lambasted for apologizing too much and not giving reasons to the jury as to why she chose to vote them out, nor even admitting to ever lying to them. Courtney was seen as the most honest of the three, but was criticized for her personality and her differences with some members of the jury, as well as being too dependent on Todd and Amanda. Todd was seen as the most manipulative and deceitful of the three, but was more honest about his lying (unlike Amanda) and was seen as playing the game since Day One (unlike Courtney).
229	15	"Reunion"	December 16, 2007	12.30	4.5/
Months later, Todd was voted the Sole Survivor with a vote of 4–2–1 over Courtney and Amanda. The 16 castaways return to discuss the season with host, Jeff Probst. James was voted by the viewers as the favorite contestant of the season, winning $100,000.

== Voting history ==
	Original tribes				Switched tribes		Merged tribe						
Episode	1	2	3	4	5	6	7	8	9	11	12	13	14
Day	3	6	9	12	15	18	21	24	27	30	33	36	38
Tribe	Zhan Hu	Zhan Hu	Fei Long	Zhan Hu	Zhan Hu	Fei Long	Hae Da Fung	Hae Da Fung	Hae Da Fung	Hae Da Fung	Hae Da Fung	Hae Da Fung	Hae Da Fung
Eliminated	Chicken	Ashley	Leslie	Dave	Aaron	Sherea	Jaime	Jean-Robert	Frosti	James	Erik	Peih-Gee	Denise
Votes	5–2–1	6–1	6–2	5–1	3–1–1	5–2	7–3	5–3–1	7–1	5–1–1	4–2	4–1	3–1
Voter	Vote												
Todd			Leslie			Sherea	Jaime	Jean-Robert	Frosti	James	Erik	Peih-Gee	Denise
Courtney			Jean-Robert			Jean-Robert	Jaime	Jean-Robert	Frosti	James	Erik	Peih-Gee	Denise
Amanda			Leslie			Sherea	Jaime	Jean-Robert	Frosti	James	Erik	Peih-Gee	Denise
Denise			Leslie			Sherea	Jaime	Peih-Gee	Frosti	James	Erik	Peih-Gee	Todd
Peih-Gee	Chicken	Ashley		Dave	Aaron		Jean-Robert	James	Frosti	Todd	Todd	Todd	
Erik	Chicken	Ashley		Dave	Aaron		Jean-Robert	James	Frosti	James	Todd		
James			Leslie		Peih-Gee		Jaime	Jean-Robert	Frosti	Peih-Gee			
Frosti	Chicken	Ashley		Dave		Sherea	Jaime	Jean-Robert	Erik				
Jean-Robert			Leslie			Sherea	Jaime	James					
Jaime	Chicken	Ashley		Dave	Aaron		Jean-Robert						
Sherea	Chicken	Ashley		Dave		Jean-Robert							
Aaron			Leslie		James								
Dave	Ashley	Ashley		Sherea									
Leslie			Jean-Robert										
Ashley	Peih-Gee	Dave											
Chicken	Ashley												

Jury vote
Episode	15		
Day	39		
Finalist	Todd	Courtney	Amanda
Votes	4–2–1		
Juror	Vote		
Denise		Yes	
Peih-Gee	Yes		
Erik			Yes
James		Yes	
Frosti	Yes		
Jean-Robert	Yes		
Jaime	Yes		

== Production ==
=== Filming ===
The specific location is in Mount Lu West Sea, Jiujiang. It is also the northernmost Survivor season held to date, well outside of the tropical zone. Applications were due on January 30, 2007. Around March 2007, about 800 applicants were selected for an interview by CBS. Out of those 800, 48 semi-finalists were selected to go to Los Angeles in April–May 2007. From these semi-finalists, 16 were selected to participate in the show between June and August 2007. The final contestants and their original tribes, Fei Long (飛龍) and Zhan Hu (戰虎), meaning Flying Dragon and Fighting Tiger respectively, were officially announced on August 20, 2007. The merged tribe was Hae Da Fung (黑打風), which means Black Fighting Wind, a name proposed by Peih-Gee Law. The "Outwit, Outplay, Outlast" slogan used in previous seasons' logos was replaced by Chinese characters. The characters translate to "compete in intelligence" (比智慧, bĭ zhìhuì), "compete in skill" (比技巧, bĭ jìqiǎo), and "compete in endurance" (比耐力, bĭ nàilì). Among the many aspects of Chinese culture and history included this season were a Buddhist ceremony and a 100-foot (30 m) tall replica of a historic temple used for Tribal Council. Each tribe received a copy of The Art of War by Sun Tzu. As stated by Probst: "Survivor is a war. The book deals with leadership and how you defeat the other tribe. It's interesting how much it plays into the game all the way through." The show had "unprecedented access" to several historical Chinese monuments, including the Shaolin Temple and the Great Wall of China.

== Reception ==
Survivor: China received positive reviews, and is a favorite among the fan-base due to the level of gameplay and entertaining cast of characters. The villainous gameplay of winner Todd Herzog, the snarky, sarcastic personality of runner-up Courtney Yates, and the entertainingly over the top personality of James Clement received high praise from both fans and critics alike. Dalton Ross of Entertainment Weekly ranked this season 16th out of 40 saying it "featured a really good cast stuck in a really bad location." In 2014, Joe Reid of The Wire ranked this season 13th out of 27. In 2015, a poll by Rob Has a Podcast ranked this season 6th out of 30 with Rob Cesternino ranking this season 11th. This was updated in 2021 during Cesternino's podcast, Survivor All-Time Top 40 Rankings, ranking 5th out of 40th. In 2020, Survivor fan site "Purple Rock Podcast" ranked this season 10th out of 40 citing its "truly fantastic cast". Later that same year, Inside Survivor ranked this season 6th out of 40 saying "what really makes this season so good is the way the cast interacts with each other." In 2024, Nick Caruso of TVLine ranked this season 12th out of 47.

== Controversy ==
At the reunion show, Denise Martin claimed that she lost her job as a lunch lady after returning home from filming. As a result, producer Mark Burnett awarded her $50,000. However, the school district for which Denise worked later refuted her version of what happened after she returned from China. According to Douglas Public School District Superintendent Nancy T. Lane, Denise asked for and received a promotion to the higher-paying, full-time custodian position before filming began for Survivor. When Denise returned to work, she returned to her new position. She requested to transfer back to her old position but it was no longer available. On the December 19, 2007, broadcast of The Early Show, Denise apologized, stating that it was "not [her] intention to be misleading" and asked that the $50,000 be donated to the Elizabeth Glaser Pediatric AIDS Foundation.
