= Todd Herzog =

American reality TV personality (born 1985)

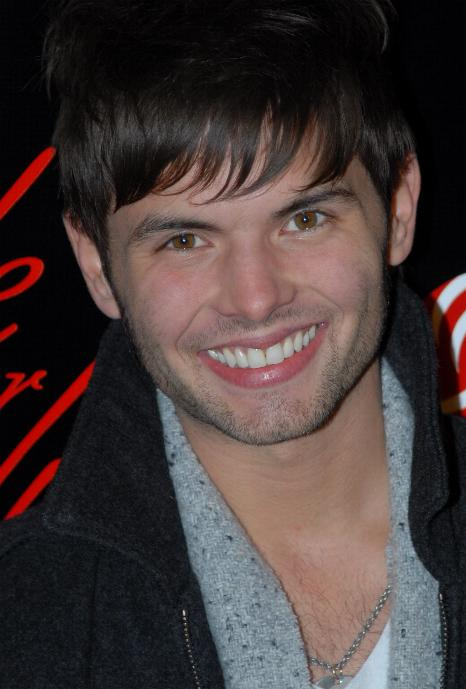
- Herzog at the Slim-Fast Fashion Show in 2008
- Born: Todd Michael Herzog; January 29, 1985 (age 41); Pleasant Grove, Utah, US
- Television: Survivor: China (winner)

Todd Michael Herzog (born January 29, 1985) is a former American reality television personality who won the 15th season of the American series Survivor, Survivor: China, in 2007.

== Survivor ==
On Survivor: China, Herzog was placed on the Fei Long Tribe. The tribe overcame its opponent, Zhan Hu, by winning immunity early on. During the first few days, Herzog made an alliance that lasted the whole game with Amanda Kimmel and Aaron Reisberger until the tribe swap. When the tribe faced tribal council, Leslie Nease was voted out. Prior to her elimination, Nease had given Herzog a clue to the hidden immunity idol, which she had received from Jaime Dugan. In the subsequent reward challenge, the two tribes learned that each would send two members to the other. Fei Long received Michael "Frosti" Zernow and Sherea Lloyd. However the swap deprived Herzog and Kimmel of their alliance member Reisberger and James Clement. The Zhan Hu tribe then threw the following immunity challenge, thus eliminating Reisberger.

Herzog and Kimmel had found the immunity idol and Zernow, Denise Martin, and Courtney Yates were informed of the discovery. When Fei Long won the reward challenge and kidnapped Clement, Herzog gave Clement the immunity idol and told him to throw the immunity challenge, in an attempt to eliminate Dugan. However, the plan backfired when Martin was unable to swallow a chicken fetus in the immunity challenge. Zhan Hu won immunity and Fei Long was sent to Tribal Council where Lloyd was eliminated. Clement found the second immunity idol at the Zhan-Hu camp later, before the two tribes merged. The original Fei Long members, both old and new, planned to vote out the new arrivals: Peih-Gee Law, Jaime Dugan, and Erik Huffman. They voted as a bloc, and Dugan was sent to the jury.

Herzog deviated from the plan to eliminate Law and got his alliance to vote out strategic threat, Jean-Robert Bellande. Law was targeted in the next vote, but her immunity win forced Herzog and his alliance to eliminate physical competitor Zernow. With seven survivors remaining, Kimmel was able to get Clement and his two immunity idols eliminated from the game. In the final six, the four Fei Long members vowed to stay together and voted out Huffman (since Law had immunity), and then eventually Law. With four remaining, Martin was eliminated and became the final juror.

At the final Tribal Council, Herzog was confronted for his actions by several members of the jury. While Kimmel was criticized for apologizing too much and not giving direct answers and Yates for riding on coattails, he was seen as the most deceiving and manipulative of the three. Bellande, in particular, interrogated Herzog on why he betrayed their alliance, to which Herzog admitted his fear of being eliminated by him. Although he had lied, the jury felt that he was the most honest about it and was playing the game since Day One, unlike Yates. In a 4–2–1 vote, he defeated allies Yates and Kimmel to win the million dollars and title of "Sole Survivor."

Subsequent to winning Survivor: China, Herzog was on the cover of December 2007's issue of Instinct, advertised as the "Million Dollar Man". According to the interview, when Herzog was 15, the first season of Survivor had just begun to air. He stated, "I knew immediately that I wanted to do the show! It was so different than anything I had seen at the time."

== Personal life ==
Herzog's hometown is Pleasant Grove, Utah, and he was raised in the Church of Jesus Christ of Latter-day Saints. Before appearing on Survivor, he worked as a flight attendant for SkyWest Airlines. Herzog is openly gay, and dated Survivor: Tocantins contestant Spencer Duhm. Herzog became engaged to Jess Hermansen in August 2019, and the two married on November 11, 2020.

Herzog had both American and Canadian citizenship when he was on Survivor, as his mother is a native of Scarborough, Ontario; however, for legal reasons, he had to renounce his Canadian citizenship in order to claim his million dollar prize.

In 2013, Herzog was suffering from alcoholism. His mother contacted the Dr. Phil show, and he appeared on the show intoxicated. Other Survivor contestants, including close friends Courtney Yates and Sandra Diaz-Twine, offered encouragement and support to Herzog. In 2017, Herzog told journalists with Stat News and The Boston Globe that he was not intoxicated when he arrived at the Dr. Phil studio but he was given a bottle of vodka and a Xanax pill before his TV appearance, which the production company denied.

Preceded by Earl Cole	Winner of Survivor; Survivor: China	Succeeded by Parvati Shallow
