= Jean-Robert Bellande =

American poker player and reality television contestant

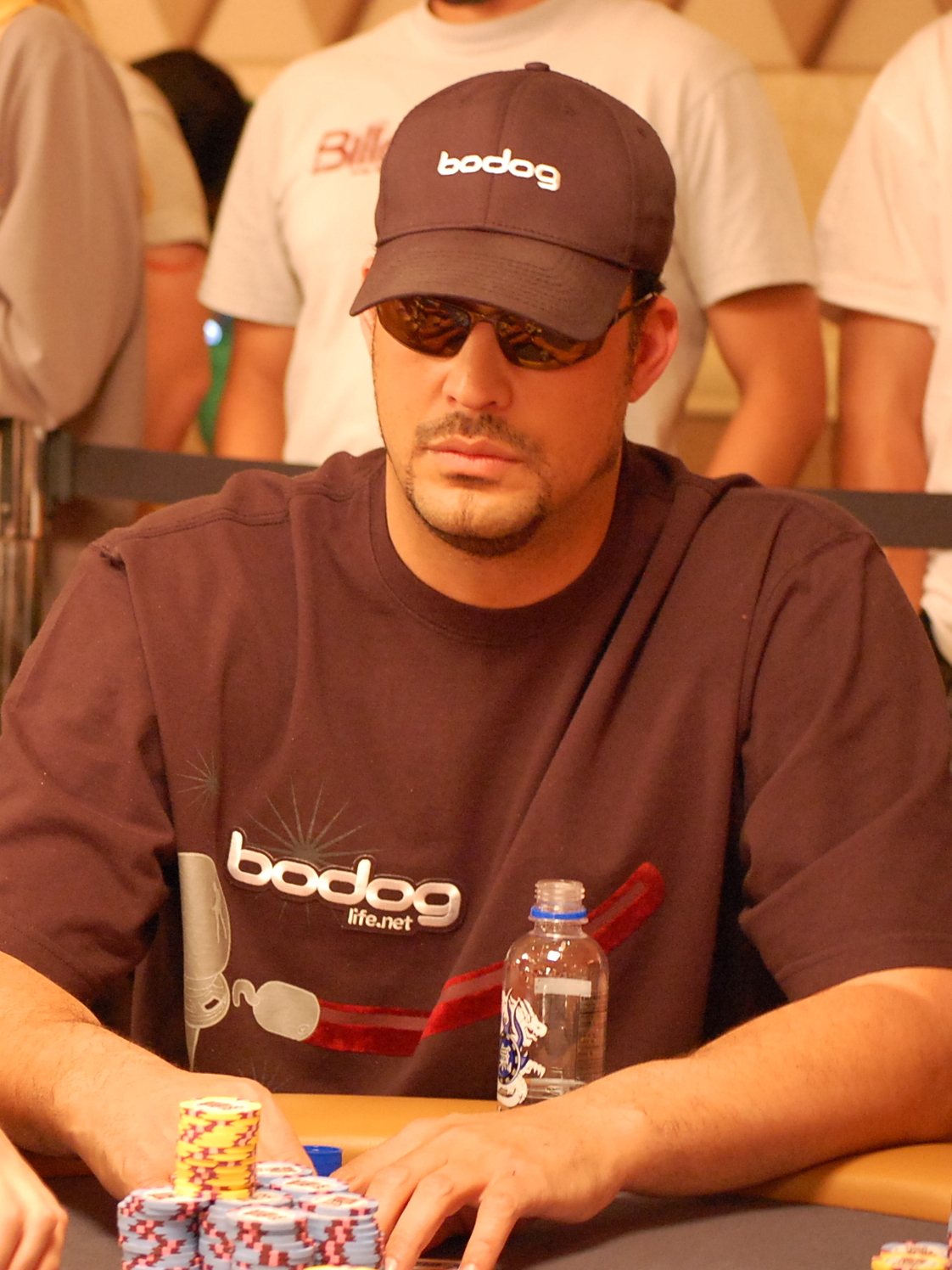
- Bellande at the 2008 World Series of Poker
- Nicknames: Bobby, JRB
- Born: September 17, 1970 (age 56); Long Island, New York

World Series of Poker
- Bracelet: 1
- Final tables: 3
- Money finishes: 17
- Highest WSOP Main Event finish: 65th, 2011

World Poker Tour
- Title: None
- Final table: None
- Money finishes: 3

Jean-Robert F. Bellande (French pronunciation: [ʒɑ̃ ʁɔbɛʁ bɛˈlɑ̃d]; born September 17, 1970) is an American professional poker player, reality TV contestant, and a nightclub owner and promoter.

== Background ==
Bellande was born on Long Island, New York to parents who emigrated from Haiti. When Bellande was five years old, his family relocated to Taiwan where his mother was a Christian missionary. He spent the next thirteen years of his life in an expatriate community before returning to the United States acquiring a Bachelor of Arts in marketing from Azusa Pacific University. He is a native French and English speaker, who learned to be proficient in Mandarin. He now resides in Las Vegas, Nevada.

== Poker ==
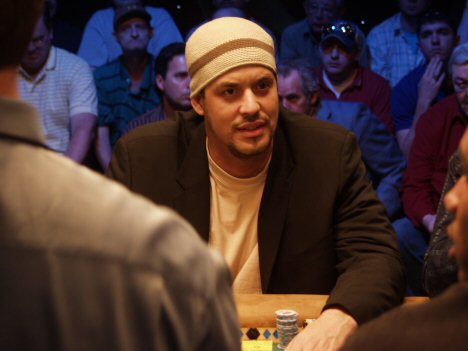
Bellande at the final table of the World Series of Poker Circuit Event in 2005

Bellande first gained public exposure during a World Series of Poker circuit event in March 2005. He finished 3rd, behind Doug Lee and Jennifer Harman, winning $210,900. Bellande was noted for his aggressive table banter throughout this televised event. A week later, Bellande defeated John Phan to win first prize at the 2005 Winnin' o' the Green tournament, earning a further $148,000.

Bellande has also finished in the money of World Series of Poker (WSOP) and World Poker Tour (WPT) events, and appeared in the WPT Bad Boys of Poker II invitational event won by Tony G.

At the 2008 World Series of Poker, Bellande came close to capturing his first bracelet when he finished runner-up to Matt Graham in the $1,500 Limit Hold'em - Shootout event, earning $173,564, and later he finished in 442nd place out of 6,844 entries at the Main Event that same year.

At the 2015 World Series of Poker, Bellande finished 2nd in the $50,000 Player's Championship for $784,828.

At the 2018 World Series of Poker, Bellande won his first World Series of Poker bracelet and $616,302 in Event #58: $5,000 No-Limit Hold’em Six-Handed.

As of 2018, his total live tournament winnings exceed $2,800,000.

=== World Series of Poker bracelets ===
Year	Event	Prize Money
2018	$5,000 No Limit Hold'em 6-Handed	$616,302

== Survivor: China ==
Bellande was a contestant on Survivor: China as a member of the Fei Long Tribe, and later Hae Da Fung. Noted was his conflict with fellow contestant Courtney Yates and his numerous gaffes. He was voted out 9th, becoming the 2nd member of the jury. He cast his jury vote for Todd Herzog to win the million dollar prize, which Herzog ended up achieving.
