= Pleasant Grove Tithing Office =

- U.S. National Register of Historic Places
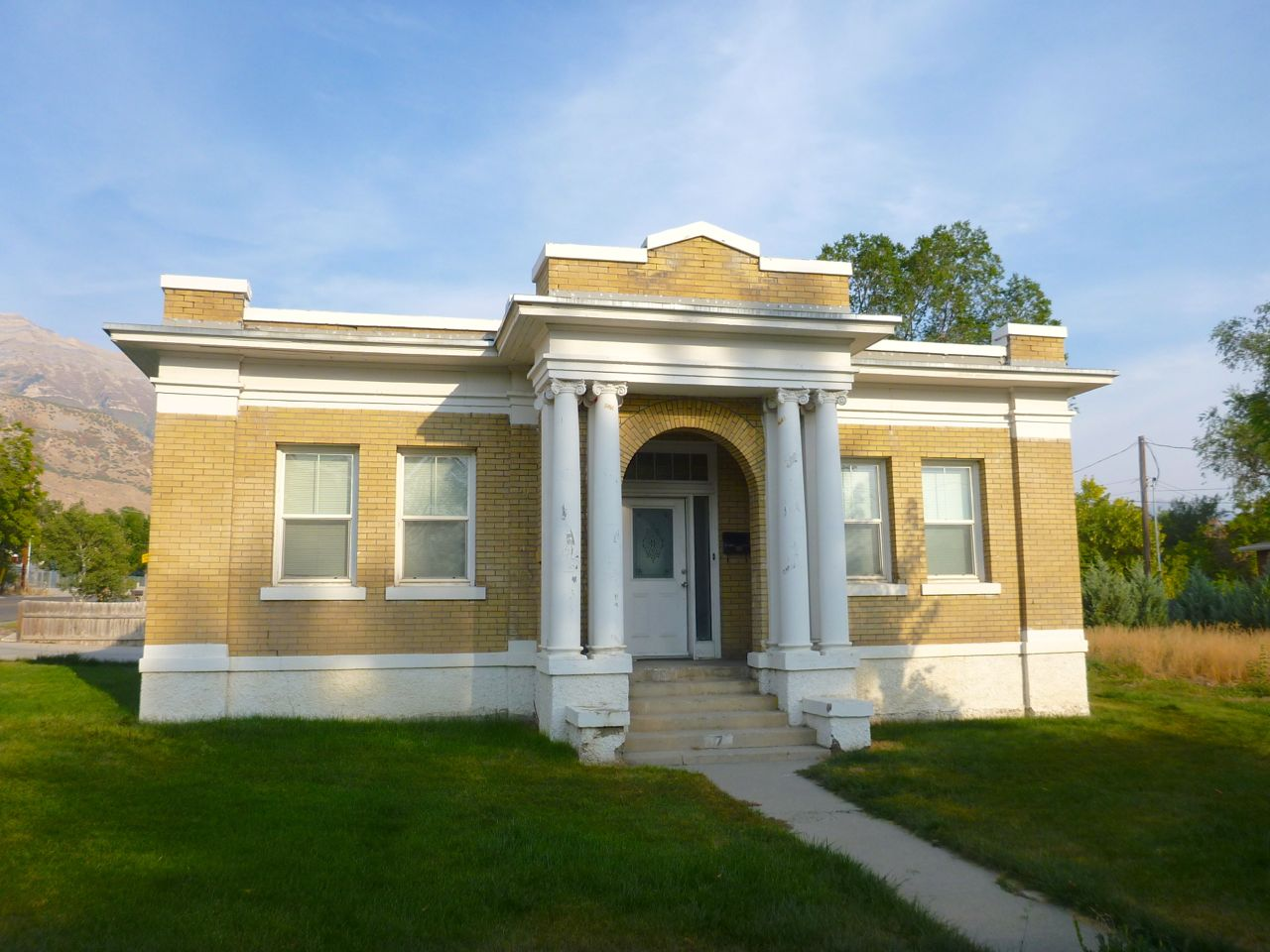

- Location within Utah Location within the United States
- Location: 7 S. 300 East, Pleasant Grove, Utah
- Coordinates: 40°21′50″N 111°44′4″W
- Area: less than one acre
- Built: 1908
- Architectural style: Classical Revival
- MPS: Tithing Offices and Granaries of the Mormon Church TR
- NRHP reference No.: 85000288
- Added to NRHP: January 25, 1985

The Pleasant Grove Tithing Office at 7 South 300 East in Pleasant Grove, Utah was built c.1908. It was listed on the National Register of Historic Places in 1985.

It is a one-story building built of brick and is one of 28 surviving historic tithing offices in Utah. It is rare among tithing offices for its flat roof and Neoclassical style with Tuscan columns, a centered pavilion, and pilasters.
