= Pleasant Grove Historic District =

Historic district in Utah, United States

- U.S. National Register of Historic Places
- U.S. Historic district
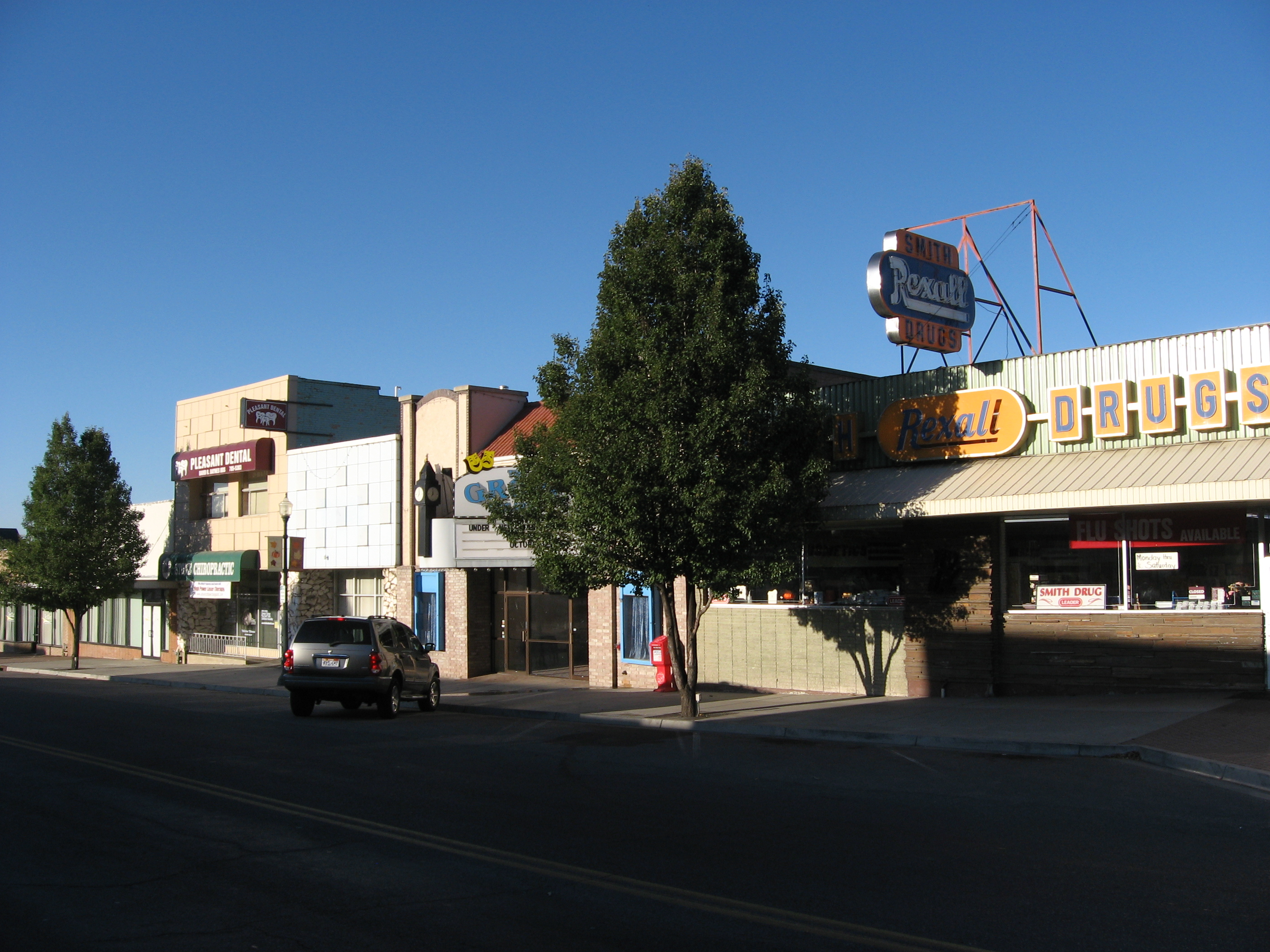
- Commercial buildings in the district

- Location within Utah Location within the United States
- Location: Roughly bounded by 100 N., 500 S., 300 E. and 100 W., Pleasant Grove, Utah
- Coordinates: 40°21′43″N 111°44′17″W
- Area: 112 acres (45 ha)
- Built: 1853
- Architectural style: Late 19th and 20th Century Revivals, Late Victorian, Mid 19th Century Revival, Bungalow/craftsman
- NRHP reference No.: 95001434
- Added to NRHP: December 13, 1995

The Pleasant Grove Historic District is a 112-acre (45 ha) historic district in Pleasant Grove, Utah, United States that was listed on the National Register of Historic Places in 1995.

== Description ==
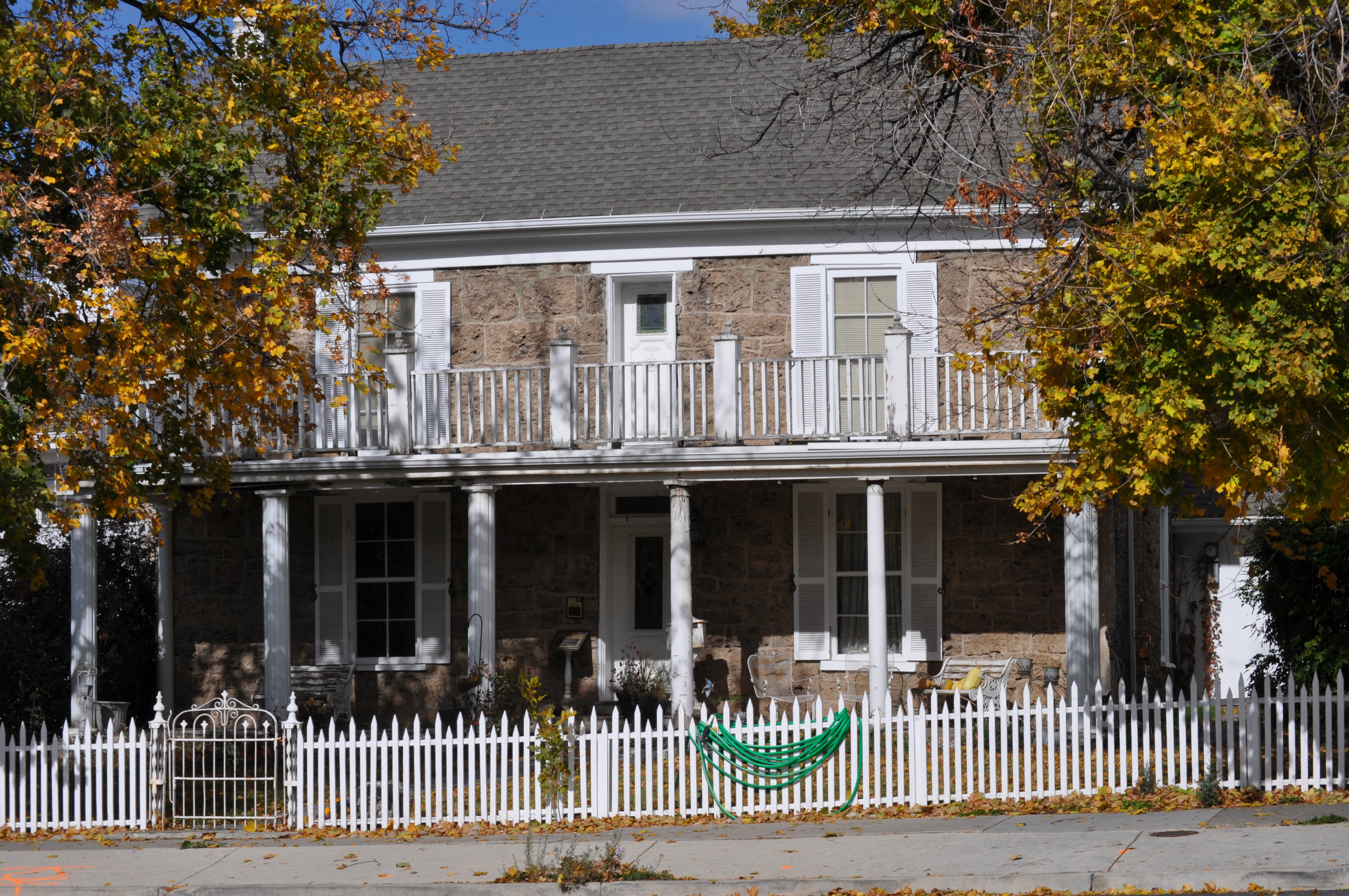
The Ashton Driggs House, a residence listed separately on the National Register of Historic Places, but located within the Pleasant Grove Historic District, November 2014

The district's significance dates from 1853, when a fort was built that attracted expanded settlement. Development at first was within the 1853 fort's walls, and includes vernacular adobe buildings from 1853. The district includes about a 16 block area. The listing included 134 contributing buildings.

The Vance/Lanbaugh House at 79 West 200 South, and about 20 others (comprising about 15 percent of the district), is in the California Bungalow style of architecture. This particular house was built c.1915 using native soft rock and including Bungalow features of exposed purlins and a low-pitched gable roof.

About ten percent of the historic houses are completed in Period Revival styles. For example, the Clifford L. Wright House at 90 North 100 East, built in 1933, is a Tudor Revival style house that "features the typical steeply pitched gable entry with an asymmetrically placed rounded arch doorway."

== See also ==
- National Register of Historic Places listings in Utah County, Utah
