= Pleasant Grove, Missouri =

Extinct hamlet in Missouri, U.S.

Coordinates: 36.737834°N 90.829012°W

Pleasant Grove is an extinct town in Ripley County, in the U.S. state of Missouri. The GNIS classifies it as a populated place.

Pleasant Grove was laid out in 1878, and so named on account of the appearance of the original town site. A post office called Pleasant Grove was established in 1877, and remained in operation until 1906.
