= Pleasant Grove, Georgia =

Unincorporated community in Georgia, U.S.

Coordinates: 34°52′54.28″N 85°8′17.82″W

Pleasant Grove is an unincorporated community in Catoosa County, in the U.S. state of Georgia.

== History ==
Pleasant Grove took its name from a local church of the same name.
