= Pleasant Grove, Utah =

City in Utah, United States

- City
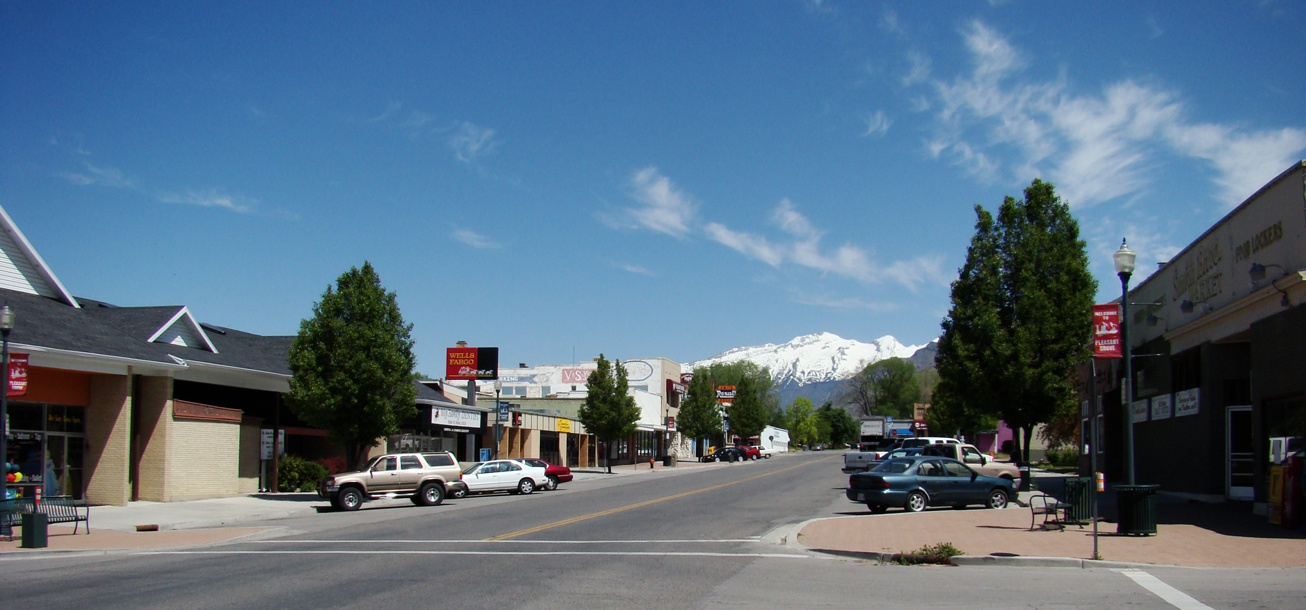
- Pleasant Grove Main Street
- Nickname: Utah's City of Trees
- Location in Utah County and the state of Utah
- Coordinates: 40°22′13″N 111°44′53″W
- Country: United States
- State: Utah
- County: Utah
- Settled: 1850
- Incorporated: January 18, 1855

Government
  - Mayor: Eric Jensen

Area
  - Total: 9.18 sq mi (23.77 km^{2})
  - Land: 9.18 sq mi (23.77 km^{2})
  - Water: 0 sq mi (0.00 km^{2})
- Elevation: 4,623 ft (1,409 m)

Population (2020)
  - Total: 37,726
  - Density: 4,111/sq mi (1,587/km^{2})
- Time zone: UTC−7 (Mountain (MST))
  - Summer (DST): UTC−6 (MDT)
- ZIP code: 84062
- Area codes: 385, 801
- FIPS code: 49-60930
- GNIS feature ID: 2411438
- Website: www.pgcityutah.gov

Pleasant Grove, originally named Battle Creek, is a city in Utah County, Utah, United States, known as "Utah's City of Trees". It is part of the Provo-Orem metropolitan area. The population was 39,604 as of April of 2025.

== History ==
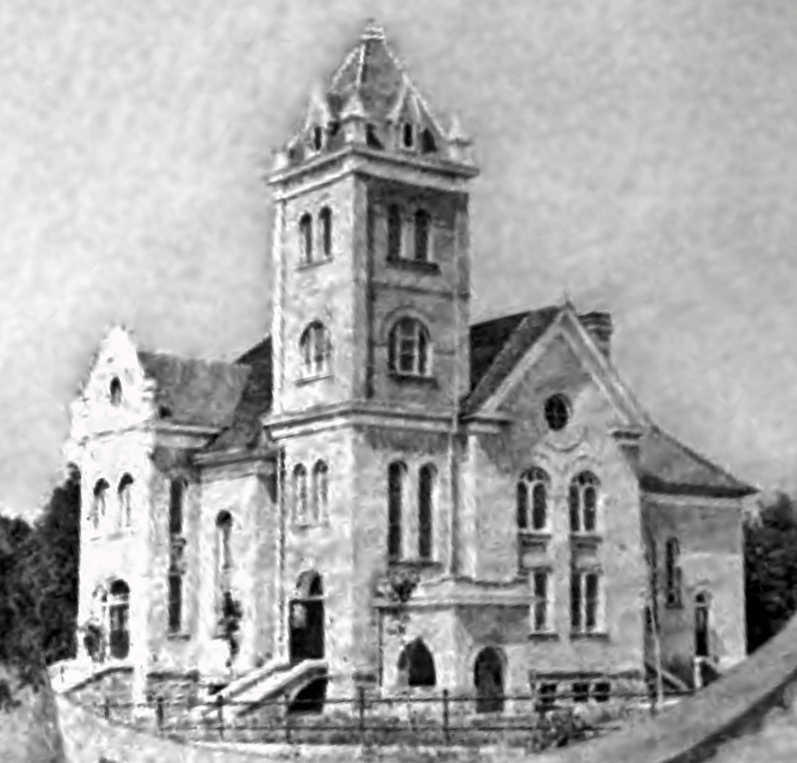
Pleasant Grove Tabernacle circa 1910

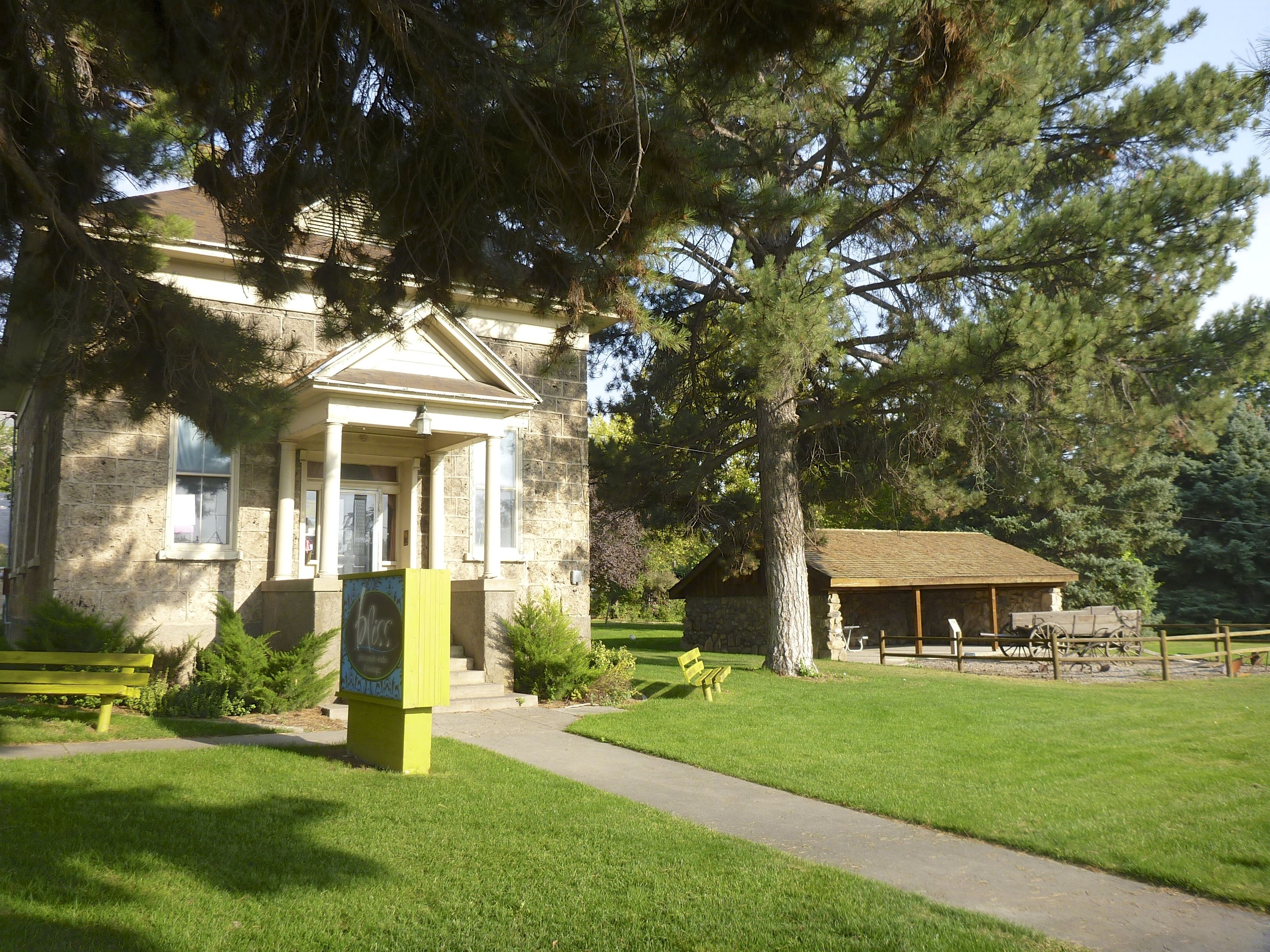
Old Pleasant Grove Town Hall

Henson Walker Jr, a prominent Mormon pioneer, migrated to Utah as Captain and scout of the Brigham Young Vanguard Company. Henson served as bodyguard to the Prophet Joseph Smith, a Major in the Nauvoo Legion and the first mayor of Pleasant Grove in 1854. Later, he would be sent on a mission to Great Britain from 1863 to 1865, sent to preside over the Scottish Mission in 1864. Later filled two missions to the Northern States. Served as a bishop and president of the high priest quorum of the Utah and Alpine Stakes. His grandson, James Henson Walker, taught in Pleasant Grove schools for fifteen years. He served as a principal, and Pleasant Grove High School was officially inaugurated under his leadership.

The original name of the city was Battle Creek. It was named for a massacre which took place there in 1849 between Mormon settlers and a small band of Ute Indians, wherein all the male Utes were massacred when Brigham Young believed the natives had stolen some of his horses (which were found before the attack on the Utes occurred). The settlers later decided they needed a more uplifting name and began calling their town Pleasant Grove after a grove of cottonwood trees located between Battle Creek and Grove Creek, near the current-day intersection of Locust Avenue and Battle Creek Drive. A monument with a plaque describing this battle is located at Kiwanis Park, at the mouth of Battle Creek Canyon.

During the Walker Indian War in the 1850s, citizens built a fort with walls two or three feet thick and six feet tall that occupied an area the size of sixteen city blocks. The settlers in the area at the time built homes inside the fort. While the fort no longer stands, memorial cornerstones were erected by local historians. The northeast monument was erected near the intersection of 100 North and 300 East streets. The northwest monument was erected four blocks west of that point at 100 West Street and the southeast monument erected four blocks south at 300 South Street. The southwest monument would have been located near 300 South 100 West, the area is now occupied by a large parking lot and retail store.

== Geography ==
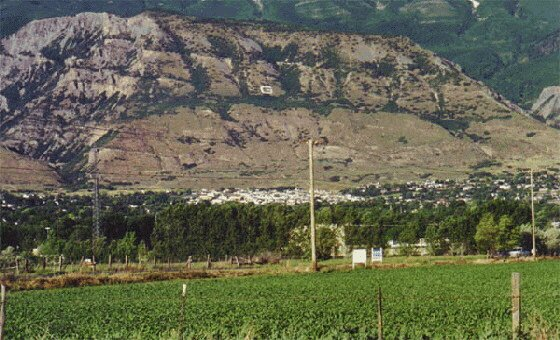
The 'G' on Little Mountain, short for "the Grove", a common nickname of Pleasant Grove High School

According to the United States Census Bureau, the city has a total area of 9.2 square miles (23.7 km^{2}), all land. Sloping off the Mt. Timpanogos bench, Pleasant Grove is represented by a large, white hillside letter "G" just above the city. A small distance south on Battle Creek Canyon is the creek of the same name and 50 feet (15 m) tall Battle Creek Falls.

=== Climate ===
Pleasant Grove's climate features cold winters and hot, dry summers. Under the Köppen climate classification, Pleasant Grove has a hot-summer Mediterranean climate (Csa).

Climate data for Pleasant Grove, Utah, 1991–2020 normals, extremes 1947–present
Month	Jan	Feb	Mar	Apr	May	Jun	Jul	Aug	Sep	Oct	Nov	Dec	Year
Record high °F (°C)	62 (17)	70 (21)	81 (27)	90 (32)	97 (36)	103 (39)	104 (40)	103 (39)	100 (38)	95 (35)	77 (25)	66 (19)	104 (40)
Mean maximum °F (°C)	53.9 (12.2)	59.8 (15.4)	72.2 (22.3)	80.3 (26.8)	88.2 (31.2)	95.5 (35.3)	100.1 (37.8)	97.3 (36.3)	92.4 (33.6)	83.2 (28.4)	68.2 (20.1)	56.5 (13.6)	100.8 (38.2)
Mean daily maximum °F (°C)	40.8 (4.9)	47.2 (8.4)	57.9 (14.4)	64.3 (17.9)	74.5 (23.6)	85.1 (29.5)	93.4 (34.1)	91.3 (32.9)	81.8 (27.7)	67.5 (19.7)	52.9 (11.6)	41.4 (5.2)	66.5 (19.2)
Daily mean °F (°C)	32.3 (0.2)	37.5 (3.1)	46.5 (8.1)	52.2 (11.2)	61.2 (16.2)	70.4 (21.3)	78.6 (25.9)	76.8 (24.9)	67.4 (19.7)	54.6 (12.6)	42.5 (5.8)	33.1 (0.6)	54.4 (12.4)
Mean daily minimum °F (°C)	23.8 (−4.6)	27.9 (−2.3)	35.1 (1.7)	40.1 (4.5)	47.9 (8.8)	55.7 (13.2)	63.9 (17.7)	62.3 (16.8)	53.1 (11.7)	41.7 (5.4)	32.2 (0.1)	24.8 (−4.0)	42.4 (5.8)
Mean minimum °F (°C)	8.9 (−12.8)	12.3 (−10.9)	20.4 (−6.4)	26.8 (−2.9)	33.6 (0.9)	41.6 (5.3)	52.9 (11.6)	51.9 (11.1)	38.7 (3.7)	27.7 (−2.4)	16.6 (−8.6)	8.7 (−12.9)	5.3 (−14.8)
Record low °F (°C)	−19 (−28)	−17 (−27)	−3 (−19)	18 (−8)	24 (−4)	29 (−2)	42 (6)	35 (2)	24 (−4)	13 (−11)	−4 (−20)	−14 (−26)	−19 (−28)
Average precipitation inches (mm)	1.97 (50)	1.60 (41)	1.56 (40)	1.98 (50)	2.01 (51)	0.86 (22)	0.59 (15)	0.76 (19)	1.08 (27)	1.39 (35)	1.18 (30)	1.45 (37)	16.43 (417)
Average snowfall inches (cm)	11.5 (29)	8.3 (21)	3.9 (9.9)	2.8 (7.1)	0.3 (0.76)	0.0 (0.0)	0.0 (0.0)	0.0 (0.0)	0.0 (0.0)	0.8 (2.0)	3.5 (8.9)	10.3 (26)	41.4 (105)
Average precipitation days (≥ 0.01 in)	10.1	8.8	8.3	9.1	8.6	4.4	4.2	5.5	5.4	6.1	7.1	8.0	85.6
Average snowy days (≥ 0.1 in)	5.3	4.0	1.8	1.0	0.1	0.0	0.0	0.0	0.0	0.4	1.6	4.3	18.5
Source: NOAA

== Demographics ==
Historical population
Census	Pop.	Note	%±
1860	526		—
1870	930		76.8%
1880	1,775		90.9%
1890	1,926		8.5%
1900	2,460		27.7%
1910	1,618		−34.2%
1920	1,682		4.0%
1930	1,754		4.3%
1940	1,941		10.7%
1950	3,195		64.6%
1960	4,772		49.4%
1970	5,327		11.6%
1980	10,833		103.4%
1990	13,476		24.4%
2000	23,468		74.1%
2010	33,509		42.8%
2020	37,726		12.6%
U.S. Decennial Census

=== 2020 census ===
As of the 2020 census, Pleasant Grove had a population of 37,726. The median age was 28.4 years. 32.6% of residents were under the age of 18 and 9.2% of residents were 65 years of age or older. For every 100 females there were 99.9 males, and for every 100 females age 18 and over there were 96.9 males age 18 and over.

99.9% of residents lived in urban areas, while 0.1% lived in rural areas.

There were 11,082 households in Pleasant Grove, of which 47.0% had children under the age of 18 living in them. Of all households, 65.7% were married-couple households, 12.2% were households with a male householder and no spouse or partner present, and 18.8% were households with a female householder and no spouse or partner present. About 14.8% of all households were made up of individuals and 5.7% had someone living alone who was 65 years of age or older.

There were 11,388 housing units, of which 2.7% were vacant. The homeowner vacancy rate was 0.6% and the rental vacancy rate was 2.9%.

Racial composition as of the 2020 census
Race	Number	Percent
White	31,563	83.7%
Black or African American	224	0.6%
American Indian and Alaska Native	175	0.5%
Asian	478	1.3%
Native Hawaiian and Other Pacific Islander	299	0.8%
Some other race	1,687	4.5%
Two or more races	3,300	8.7%
Hispanic or Latino (of any race)	4,434	11.8%

=== 2010 census ===
As of the census of 2010, there were 33,509 people, 6,109 households, and 5,388 families residing in the city. The population density was 2,691.5 per square mile (1,039.1/km^{2}). There were 6,334 housing units at an average density of 726.4 per square mile (280.5/km^{2}). The racial makeup of the city was 95.15% White, 0.29% African American, 0.38% Native American, 0.54% Asian, 0.39% Pacific Islander, 1.75% from other races, and 1.50% from two or more races. Hispanic or Latino of any race were 4.56% of the population.

There were 6,109 households, out of which 58.0% had children under the age of 18 living with them, 77.0% were married couples living together, 8.6% had a female householder with no husband present, and 11.8% were non-families. 9.2% of all households were made up of individuals, and 3.6% had someone living alone who was 65 years of age or older. The average household size was 3.83 and the average family size was 4.11.

In the city, the population was spread out, with 41.0% under the age of 18, 11.3% from 18 to 24, 28.0% from 25 to 44, 13.8% from 45 to 64, and 5.9% who were 65 years of age or older. The median age was 24 years. For every 100 females, there were 100.8 males. For every 100 females age 18 and over, there were 98.2 males.

The median income for a household in the city was $52,036, and the median income for a family was $54,182. Males had a median income of $42,042 versus $23,296 for females. The per capita income for the city was $15,268. About 5.4% of families and 6.8% of the population were below the poverty line, including 8.1% of those under age 18 and 3.1% of those age 65 or over.

== Government ==
The city's government consists of a mayor and a city council. As of January 2026, the city's mayor is Eric Jensen. The city council is made up of five members: Dianna Anderson, Todd N. Williams, Dustin Phillips, Cyd LeMone and Steve Rogers. Council members serve staggered terms that end in either 2026 or 2028.

== Strawberry Days ==
Pleasant Grove is home to the summer festival known as Strawberry Days. The first annual “Strawberry Day” (initially a single-day event) was held on June 21, 1922, with 10,000-15,000 people in attendance. The festival was organized by the Wasatch Club, a forerunner of today’s Chamber of Commerce. This first celebration included strawberries and cream and a parade; both remain staples of modern-day Strawberry Days.

The festival’s name originated when strawberry farming was a major economic activity in the city. (Approximately 250 acres of strawberries were being grown in the area when the first festival was held in 1922). The festival retains the traditional name, even though large-scale commercial growing of the fruit no longer occurs in the city. The festival is Utah’s second oldest community harvest festival, younger only than Brigham City's Peach Days–a festival Strawberry Days’ founders hoped to rival.

Today, a rodeo held in conjunction with this festival brings competitors and spectators from throughout the West. The festival includes parades, a carnival, pageants and other activities. The festival is usually held the third week of June, a period chosen in 1922, which would generally correspond with the end of the strawberry harvest for the area.

== First amendment case ==
In November 2008, the United States Supreme Court heard oral arguments in the case of Pleasant Grove City v. Summum. The case regarded whether Pleasant Grove, which allowed the display of a privately donated Ten Commandments on public property, must also allow the religion of Summum to display a monument to its "Seven Aphorisms" alongside. Pleasant Grove had declined the Summum offer in 2003. The city lost in the Tenth Circuit. However, the city appealed to the Supreme Court which overturned the Court of Appeals decision, citing the permanence of monuments as opposed to forms of constitutionally protected free speech as well as the fact that governments take ownership of monuments on their properties and thus must "take some care in accepting donated monuments."

== Education ==
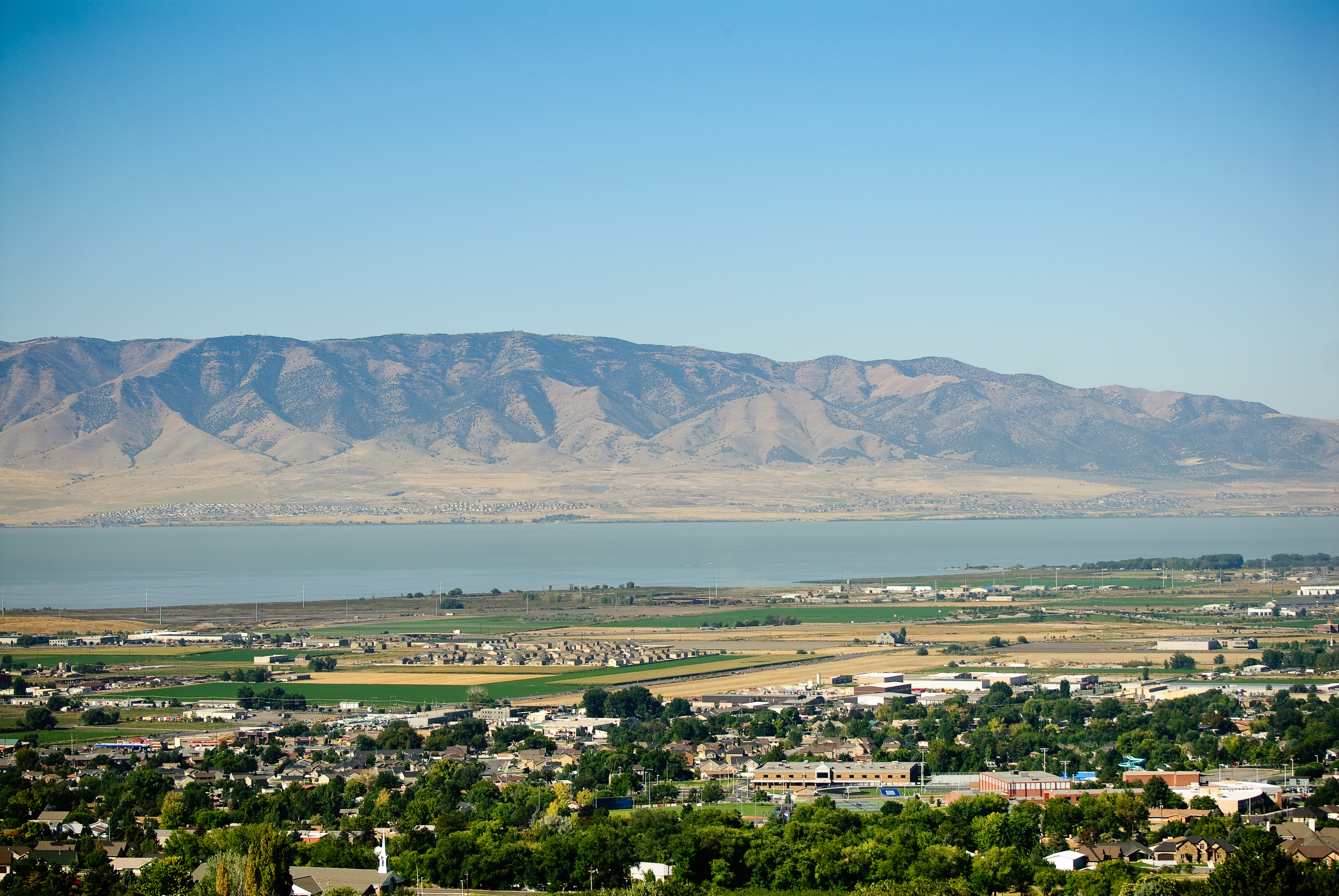
Pleasant Grove with Utah Lake in the background. Pleasant Grove High School can be seen in the foreground.

Public schools in Pleasant Grove are part of the Alpine School District. Charter schools include John Hancock Charter School and Lincoln Academy. Liahona Preparatory Academy is an accredited K-12 private school serving the area.

=== Local schools ===
==== Elementary schools ====
- Central
- Grovecrest
- John Hancock Charter School
- Liahona Preparatory Academy
- Lincoln Academy
- Manila
- Mount Mahogany
- Valley View

==== Junior high/middle schools ====
- Lincoln Academy
- Pleasant Grove Junior High School

==== High schools ====
- Pleasant Grove High School

== Recreation ==
- Community Center
- Veterans Memorial Pool
- Evermore Park

== Notable places and events ==
- Christa McAuliffe Space Education Center
- Mount Timpanogos Utah Temple (on the border in neighboring American Fork)
- Pleasant Grove Pioneers Parade
- Pleasant Grove Strawberry Days - 3rd week of June

== Notable people ==
- Quinn Allman, musician, The Used
- Howard Roscoe Driggs, Western historian and educator; born in Pleasant Grove; brother of William King Driggs, Sr.
- Brandon Fugal, businessman and owner of Skinwalker Ranch.
- Todd Herzog, winner of reality TV show Survivor: China
- Chelsie Hightower, contestant on So You Think You Can Dance
- Dane Iorg, former Major League Baseball player (St. Louis Cardinals, Kansas City Royals); World Series champion
- The King Sisters, and their father, agent and organizer William King Driggs, Sr.
- A. Ray Olpin, President of University of Utah from 1946 to 1964
- C. J. Wilcox, 28th overall pick in the 2014 NBA draft; shooting guard for the Orlando Magic

== Gallery ==
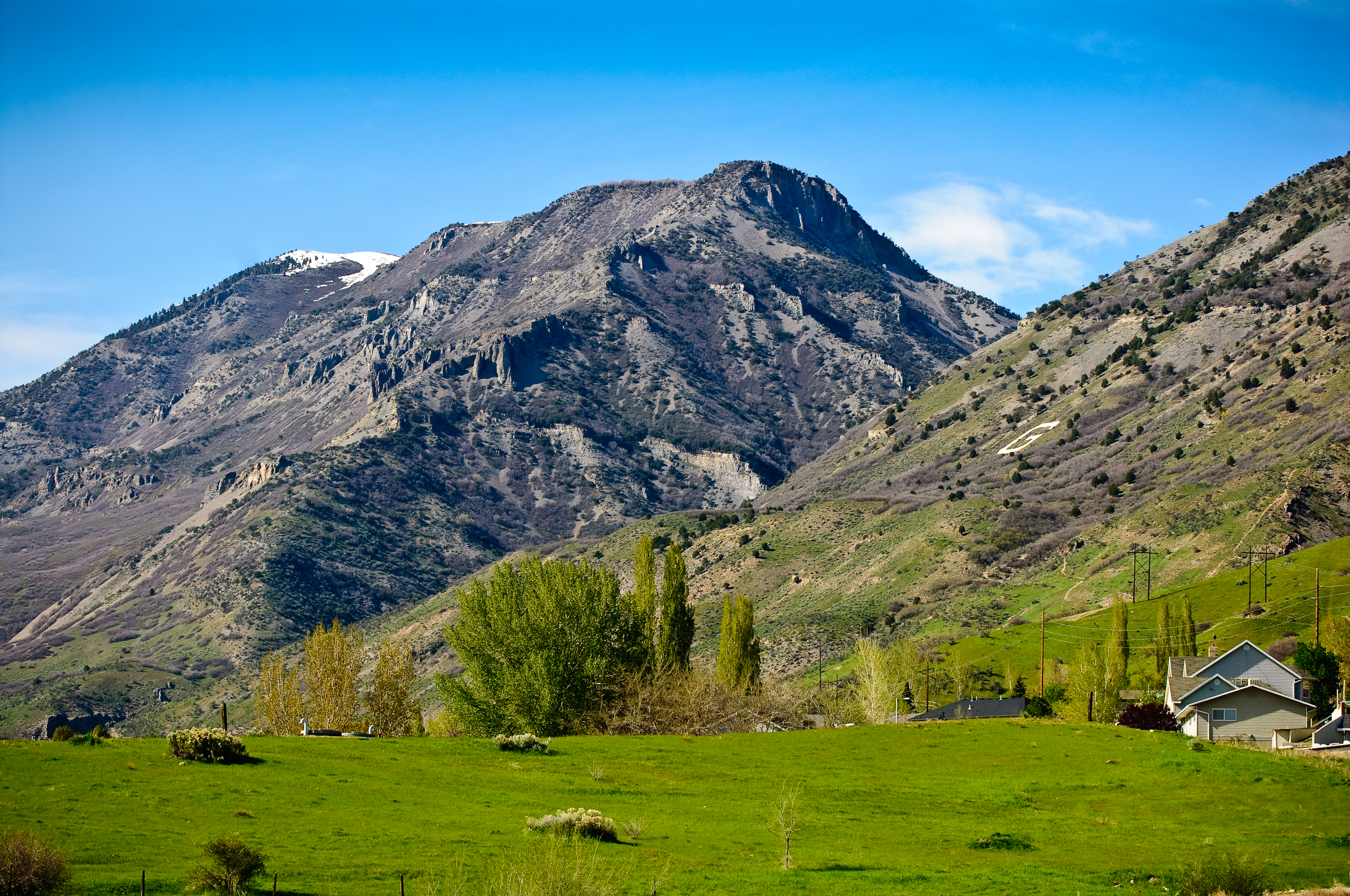
View of Mahogany Mountain in the Wasatch Range, from Pleasant Grove

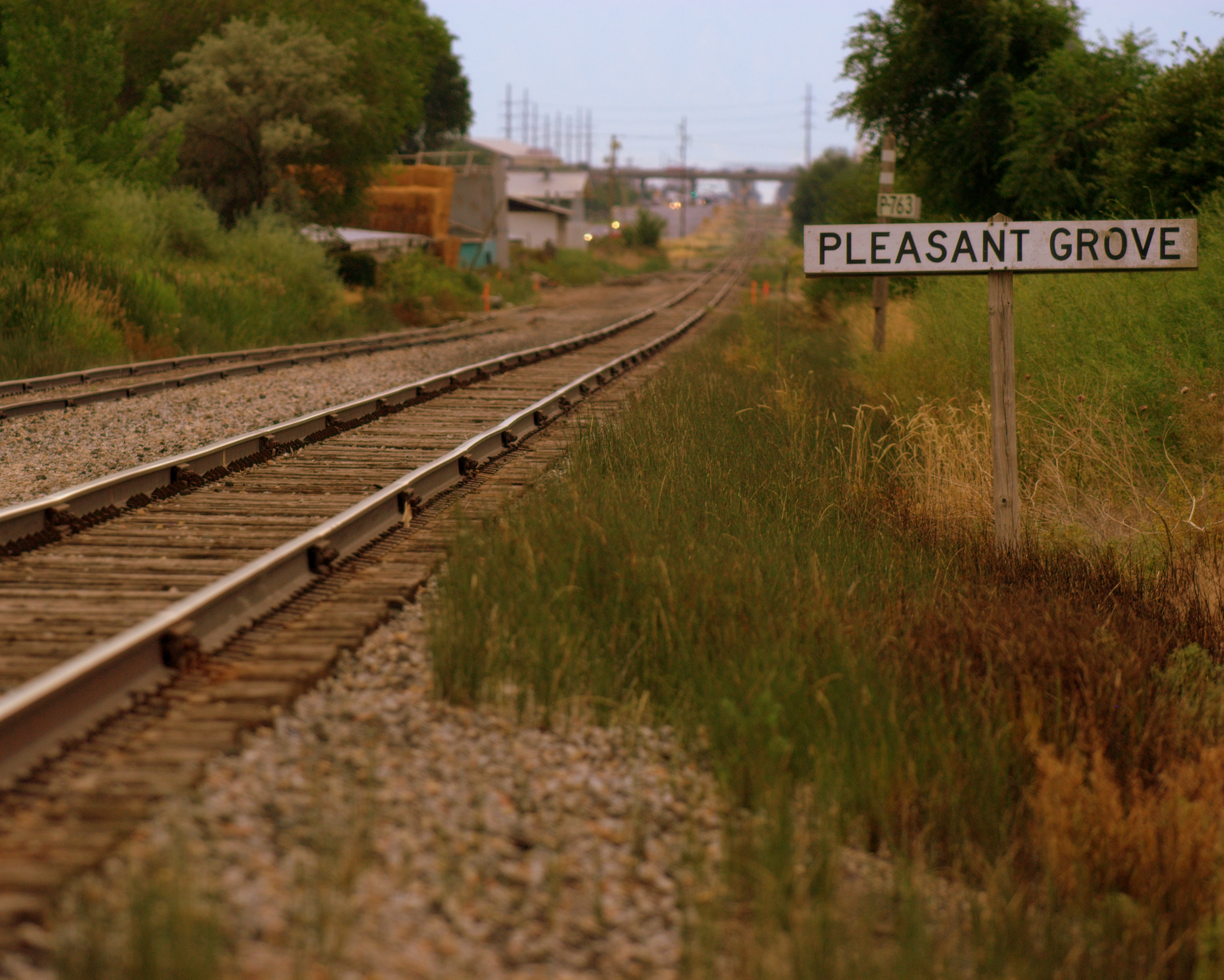
The old Utah Southern Railroad (later the Los Angeles and Salt Lake Railroad) line cutting through the city. Currently part of Union Pacific's Provo Industrial Lead.

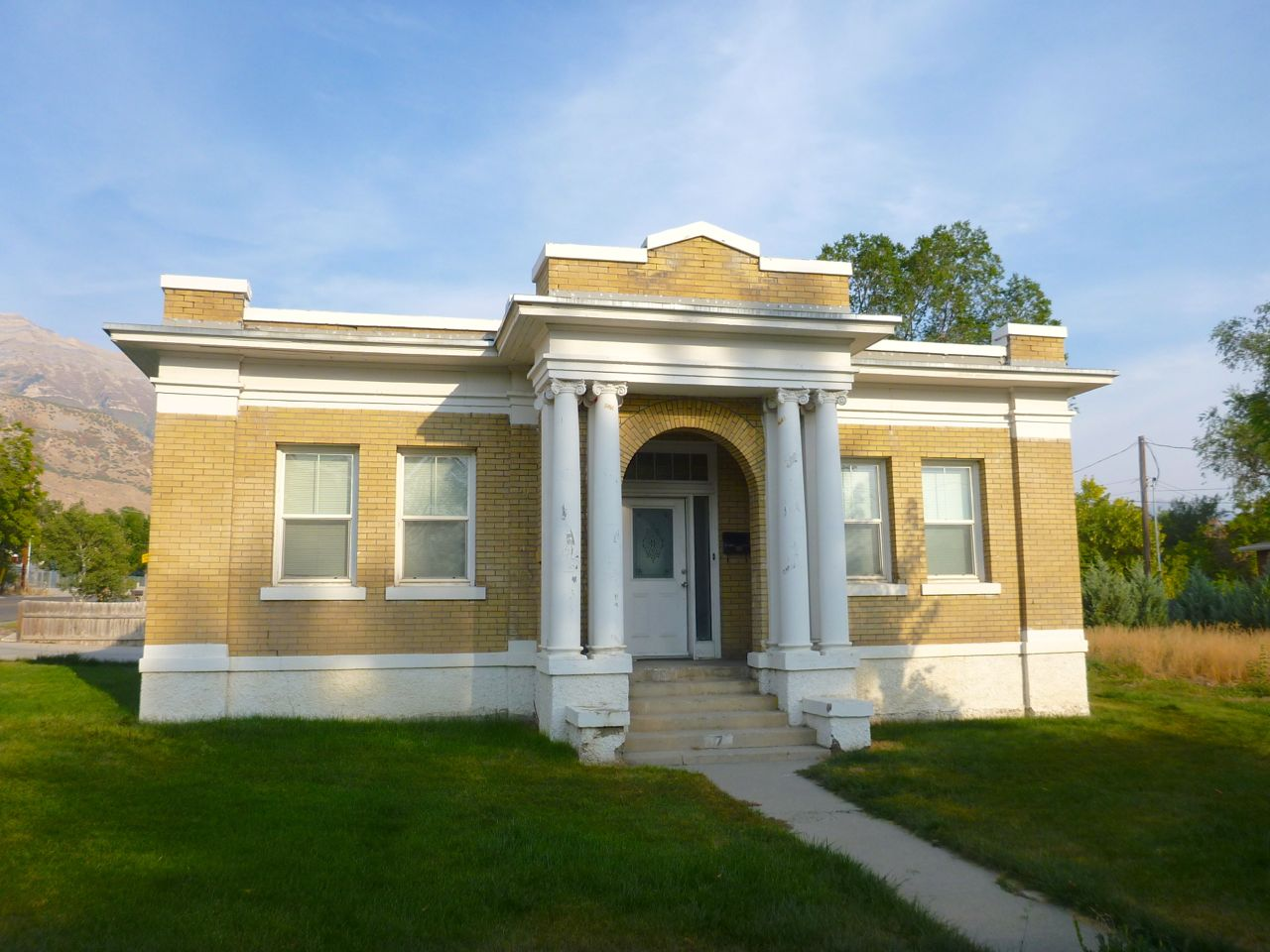
The historic tithing office

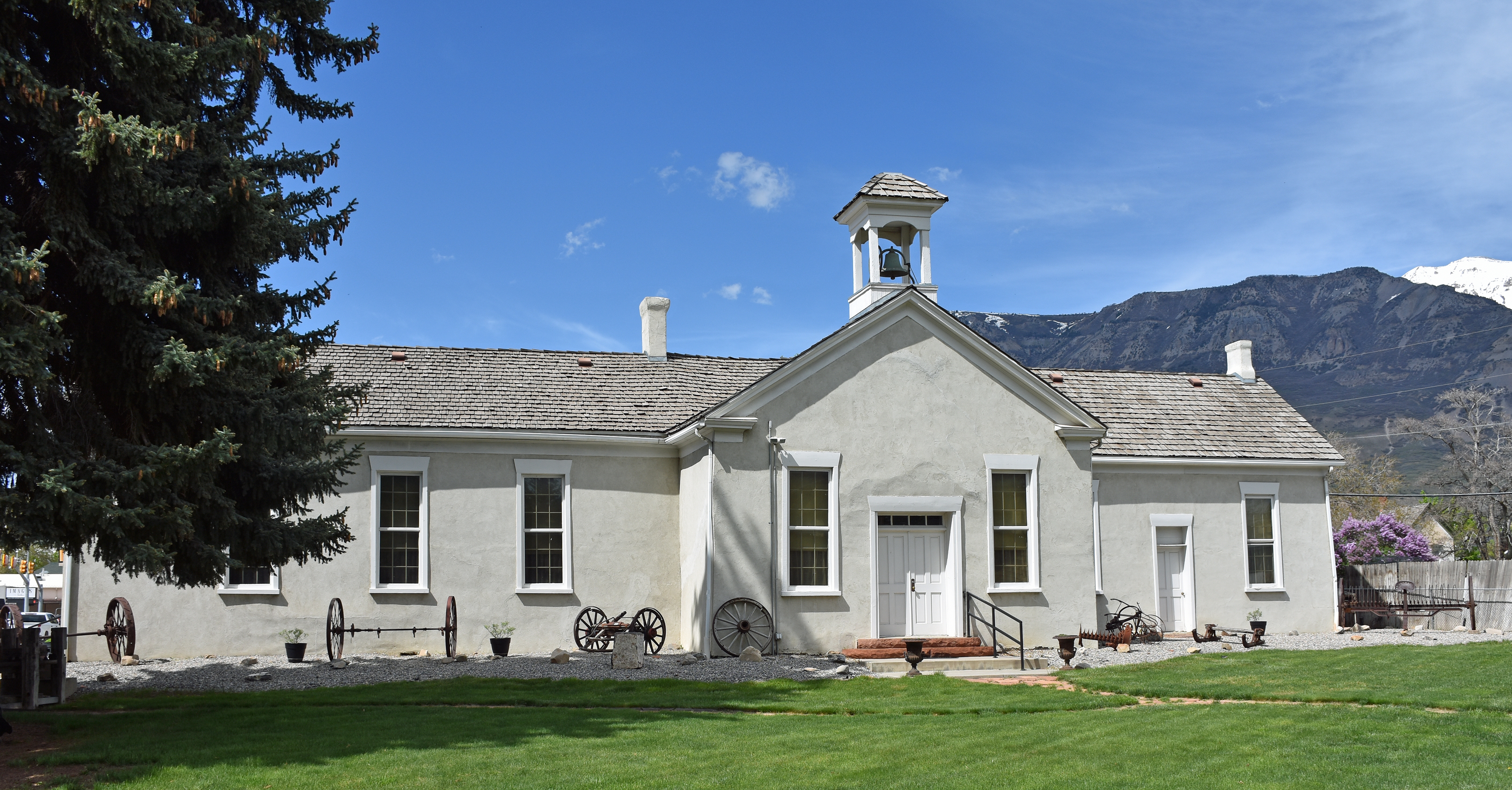
The historic Old Bell School
