= National Register of Historic Places listings in Twin Falls County, Idaho =

Location of Twin Falls County in Idaho

This is a list of the National Register of Historic Places listings in Twin Falls County, Idaho.

This is intended to be a complete list of the properties and districts on the National Register of Historic Places in Twin Falls County, Idaho, United States. Latitude and longitude coordinates are provided for many National Register properties and districts; these locations may be seen together in a map.

There are 42 properties and districts listed on the National Register in the county. More may be added; properties and districts nationwide are added to the Register weekly. Another 2 properties were once listed but have been removed.

This National Park Service list is complete through NPS recent listings posted May 1, 2026.

== Current listings ==
	Name on the Register	Image	Date listed	Location	City or town	Description
1	James Alvis House		May 23, 1980 (#80001335)	Anderson Lane; 42°30′45″N 114°28′03″W	Twin Falls	Also known as the Oren Boone House. Relocated in 1994 to make way for the Magic Valley Mall
2	Bickel School	Bickel School	August 17, 1990 (#90001233)	607 2nd Ave., E. 42°33′08″N 114°27′41″W	Twin Falls	
3	T. P. Bowlby Barn		September 7, 1983 (#83000293)	Northeast of Buhl; 42°37′23″N 114°42′17″W	Buhl	
4	Robert and Augusta Brose Ranch		November 16, 2021 (#100007168)	3094 North 3800 East; 42°26′44″N 114°18′17″W	Hansen vicinity	
5	Buhl City Hall		February 8, 1978 (#78001099)	Broadway and Elm St. 42°36′00″N 114°45′38″W	Buhl	Demolished on January 26, 1993
6	Buhl IOOF Building	Buhl IOOF Building	December 27, 1984 (#84000482)	1014-16 Main St. 42°35′56″N 114°45′35″W	Buhl	
7	Caldron Linn	Caldron Linn	June 27, 1972 (#72000442)	2 miles east of Murtaugh and 6 miles south of Hazelton; 42°29′53″N 114°09′46″W	Murtaugh and Hazelton	Extends into Jerome County
8	Cedar Draw School		August 8, 1991 (#91000986)	4300 N. Rd. between 1900 and 2000 E. 42°37′20″N 114°40′03″W	Buhl	
9	Dau-Webbenhorst Barn	Dau-Webbenhorst Barn	September 7, 1983 (#83000295)	Southeast of Buhl; 42°34′40″N 114°44′22″W	Buhl	
10	Achille Duquesne House	Achille Duquesne House	September 23, 1993 (#93000990)	710 W. Midway; 42°34′17″N 114°36′49″W	Filer	
11	Hollister School		August 8, 1991 (#91000984)	2464 Salmon Ave. 42°21′24″N 114°35′31″W	Hollister	
12	Hotel Buhl	Hotel Buhl	September 12, 1985 (#85002158)	1004 Main St. 42°35′56″N 114°45′35″W	Buhl	
13	Idaho Power Substation	Idaho Power Substation	June 23, 1978 (#78001100)	Van Buren St. and Filer Ave. 42°34′14″N 114°28′12″W	Twin Falls	
14	Kimberly High School	Kimberly High School	August 17, 1990 (#90001229)	141 Center St., W. 42°32′00″N 114°21′55″W	Kimberly	
15	Rudolf Kunze Barn	Rudolf Kunze Barn	April 5, 1994 (#83000292)	Northeast of Buhl; 42°35′05″N 114°42′46″W	Buhl	Gambrel-roofed dairy barn built in 1915. Listed, delisted, relisted.
16	Lincoln School	Lincoln School	August 17, 1990 (#90001218)	238 7th St., N. 42°33′43″N 114°28′33″W	Twin Falls	
17	Lincoln Street Electric Streetlights	Lincoln Street Electric Streetlights	April 27, 1992 (#92000413)	105, 120, 147, 174, 189, 210, 217, 242, 275, and 290 Lincoln St. 42°33′51″N 114°27′38″W	Twin Falls	
18	Art and Frieda Maxwell Barn	Art and Frieda Maxwell Barn	September 7, 1983 (#83000291)	Southeast of Buhl; 42°35′25″N 114°42′36″W	Buhl	
19	Robert McCollum House	Robert McCollum House	November 4, 1982 (#82000386)	708 E. Shoshone St. 42°33′36″N 114°27′48″W	Twin Falls	
20	Milner Dam and the Twin Falls Main Canal	Milner Dam and the Twin Falls Main Canal	July 10, 1986 (#86001720)	Twin Falls Main Canal between Murtaugh and Milner Lakes; 42°29′58″N 114°04′50″W	Murtaugh	Extends into Jerome County
21	Burton Morse House	Burton Morse House	September 23, 1993 (#93000992)	136 10th Ave., N. 42°33′45″N 114°27′41″W	Twin Falls	
22	Owsley Bridge	Owsley Bridge	September 18, 1998 (#98001172)	Approximately 200 yards north of the junction of old U.S. Route 30 and Bell Rapids Rd. 42°45′52″N 114°53′21″W	Hagerman	Extends into Gooding County
23	D. H. Peck House	D. H. Peck House	September 23, 1993 (#93000993)	207 E. 8th Ave. 42°33′35″N 114°27′40″W	Twin Falls	
24	Pleasant Valley School	Pleasant Valley School	August 8, 1991 (#91000985)	3501 E. 3100 N. 42°26′48″N 114°21′45″W	Kimberly	
25	Pleasant View School	Pleasant View School	August 8, 1991 (#91000987)	2500 E. 3600 N. 42°31′12″N 114°33′30″W	Twin Falls	
26	Walter Priebe House	Walter Priebe House	September 23, 1993 (#93000991)	155 7th Ave. E. 42°33′34″N 114°27′44″W	Twin Falls	
27	Ramona Theater	Ramona Theater	December 22, 1976 (#76000682)	113 Broadway; 42°35′55″N 114°45′31″W	Buhl	
28	Rogerson School		December 3, 2019 (#100004759)	2291 East 1510 North; 42°13′00″N 114°35′45″W	Rogerson	
29	Salmon Falls Dam	Salmon Falls Dam	May 15, 2009 (#09000328)	Three Creek Highway; 42°12′44″N 114°44′03″W	Rogerson	
30	Henry Schick Barn		September 7, 1983 (#83000290)	Southeast of Buhl; 42°34′46″N 114°42′42″W	Buhl	Demolished
31	C. Harvey Smith House	C. Harvey Smith House	April 3, 1978 (#78001101)	255 4th Ave., E. 42°33′23″N 114°27′51″W	Twin Falls	
32	Stricker Store and Farm		August 30, 1979 (#79000810)	North of Rock Creek; 42°27′33″N 114°19′16″W	Twin Falls	
33	Toana Freight Wagon Road Historic District		November 29, 2006 (#06001075)	Generally runs south to north from Nevada-Idaho state line to the Snake River; 42°21′40″N 114°52′04″W	Castleford	
34	Twin Falls Bank and Trust Company Building	Twin Falls Bank and Trust Company Building	September 4, 1986 (#86002155)	102 Main Ave. S 42°33′20″N 114°28′08″W	Twin Falls	
35	Twin Falls Canal Company Building	Twin Falls Canal Company Building	August 30, 1996 (#96000944)	162 2nd St., W. 42°33′21″N 114°28′17″W	Twin Falls	
36	Twin Falls City Park Historic District	Twin Falls City Park Historic District	March 30, 1978 (#78001102)	2nd N., 2nd E., and Shoshone Sts., 4th and 6th Aves. 42°33′31″N 114°27′57″W	Twin Falls	
37	Twin Falls Downtown Historic District	Twin Falls Downtown Historic District	February 4, 2000 (#00000035)	Roughly bounded by 2nd Ave., N., 2nd St., E., 2nd St., W., 2nd St., S., 3rd Ave., S., and 3rd St., W. 42°33′23″N 114°28′14″W	Twin Falls	
38	Twin Falls Milling and Elevator Company Warehouse	Twin Falls Milling and Elevator Company Warehouse	August 31, 1995 (#95001059)	516 2nd St., S. 42°33′08″N 114°28′23″W	Twin Falls	
39	Twin Falls Original Townsite Residential Historic District	Twin Falls Original Townsite Residential Historic District	November 30, 2001 (#01001306)	Roughly bounded by Blue Lakes Ave., Addison Ave., 2nd Ave. E, and 2nd Ave. W 42°33′36″N 114°28′12″W	Twin Falls	
40	Twin Falls Warehouse Historic District	Twin Falls Warehouse Historic District	January 15, 1997 (#96001592)	Roughly bounded by 2nd Ave., 4th St., S. and W., and Minidoka Ave. 42°33′10″N 114°28′23″W	Twin Falls	
41	Union School		March 20, 2003 (#03000123)	21337 U.S. Route 30; 42°33′49″N 114°32′56″W	Filer	
42	US Post Office-Buhl Main	US Post Office-Buhl Main	March 16, 1989 (#89000130)	830 Main; 42°36′00″N 114°45′28″W	Buhl	

== Former listing ==
	Name on the Register	Image	Date listed	Date removed	Location	City or town	Description
1	Alfred Carlson Barn		September 7, 1983 (#83000296)	October 16, 1989	NE of Buhl	Buhl vicinity	Demolished
2	Gustave Kunze Barn		September 7, 1983 (#83000294)	March 22, 1994	SE of Buhl	Buhl vicinity	Demolished

== See also ==
- List of National Historic Landmarks in Idaho
- National Register of Historic Places listings in Idaho
