= Henry Schick =

German/Russian architect

Henry Schick was a pioneer barn-builder of Idaho. He was a German-Russian immigrant.

A number of his works are listed on the U.S. National Register of Historic Places.

Works include:

- T. P. Bowlby Barn, built 1912, NE of Buhl, Idaho (Schick, Henry), NRHP-listed
- Dau-Webbenhorst Barn, built 1913, SE of Buhl, Idaho (Schick, Henry), NRHP-listed
- Art and Frieda Maxwell Barn, built 1915, SE of Buhl, Idaho (Schick, Henry), NRHP-listed
- Henry Schick Barn, built 1914, SE of Buhl, Idaho (Schick, Henry), NRHP-listed

== See also ==
- Schick-Ostolasa Farmstead, 5213 Dry Creek Rd. Boise, ID Schick, Philip L.
