= Dau-Webbenhorst Barn =

- U.S. National Register of Historic Places
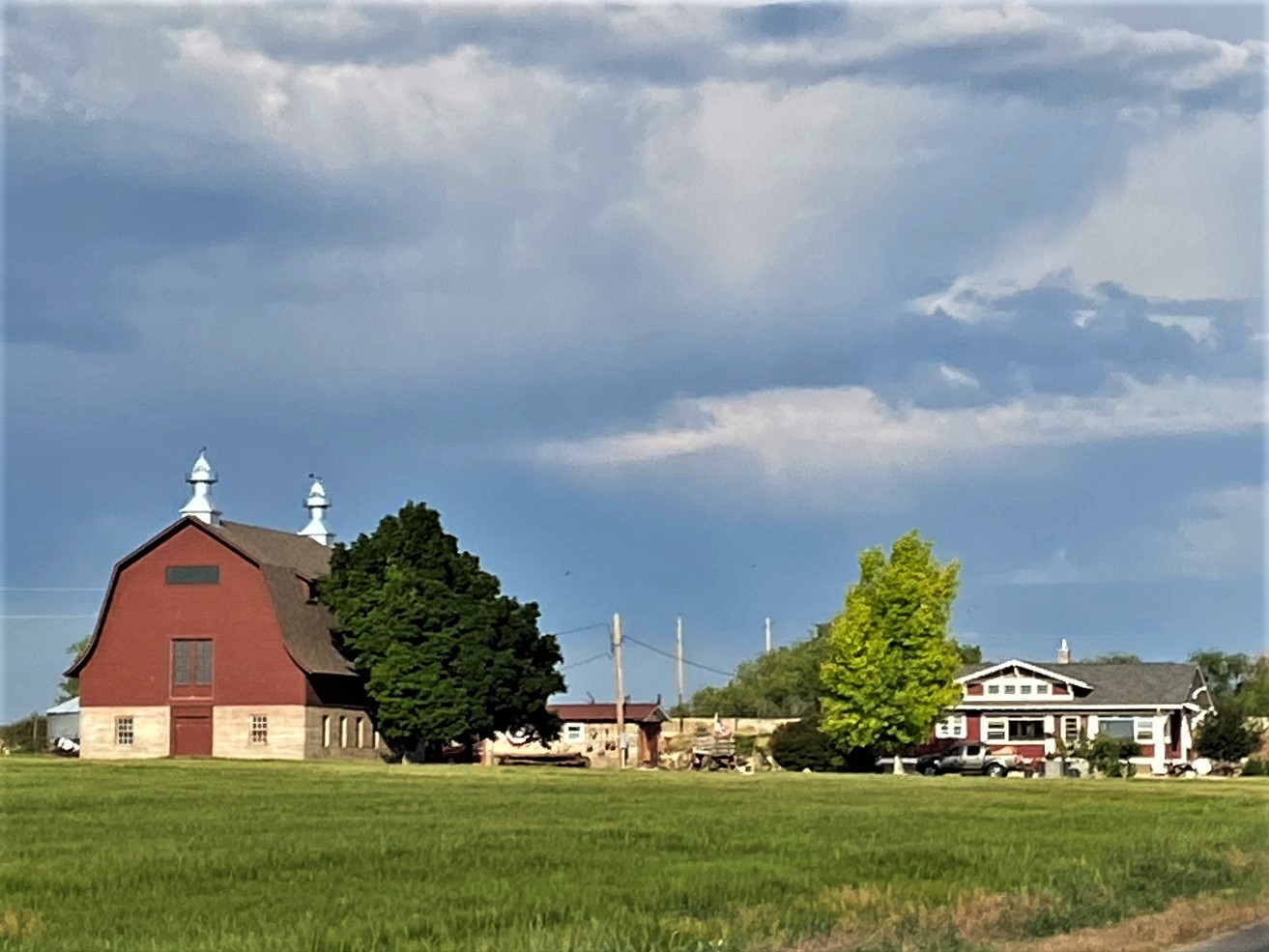

- Location within Idaho Location within the United States
- Location: SE of Buhl, Idaho
- Coordinates: 42°34′40″N 114°44′22″W
- Area: 2.5 acres (1.0 ha)
- Built: 1913
- Built by: Schick, Henry
- MPS: Buhl Dairy Barns TR
- NRHP reference No.: 83000295
- Added to NRHP: September 7, 1983

The Dau-Webbenhorst Barn, southeast of Buhl, Idaho, was built in 1913 by Henry Schick, a German-Russian immigrant to the United States. It was listed on the National Register of Historic Places in 1983.
