= T. P. Bowlby Barn =

- U.S. National Register of Historic Places
- Location within Idaho Location within the United States
- Location: NE of Buhl, Idaho
- Coordinates: 42°37′23″N 114°42′17″W
- Area: 2.5 acres (1.0 ha)
- Built: 1912
- Built by: Schick, Henry
- MPS: Buhl Dairy Barns TR
- NRHP reference No.: 83000293
- Added to NRHP: September 7, 1983

The T. P. Bowlby Barn, northeast of Buhl, Idaho, was built in 1912 by Henry Schick, a German-Russian immigrant to the United States. It was listed on the National Register of Historic Places in 1983.
