= Art and Frieda Maxwell Barn =

- U.S. National Register of Historic Places
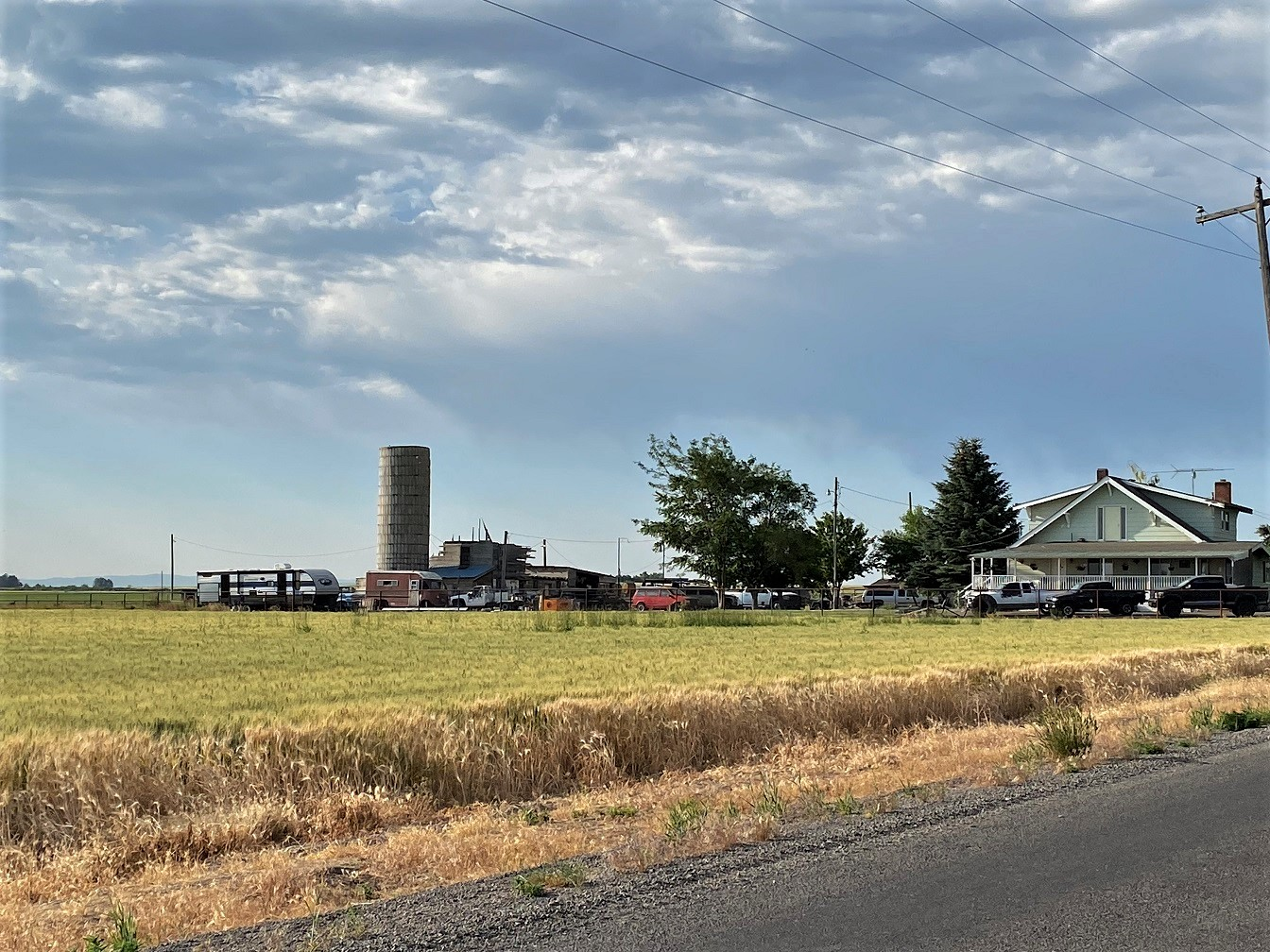
- Site of the barn

- Location within Idaho Location within the United States
- Location: SE of Buhl, Idaho
- Coordinates: 42°35′25″N 114°42′36″W
- Area: 2.5 acres (1.0 ha)
- Built: 1915
- Built by: Schick, Henry
- MPS: Buhl Dairy Barns TR
- NRHP reference No.: 83000291
- Added to NRHP: September 7, 1983

The Art and Frieda Maxwell Barn, southeast of Buhl, Idaho, United States, was built in 1915 by Henry Schick, a German-Russian immigrant to the United States. It was listed on the National Register of Historic Places in 1983.
