= Schick–Ostolasa Farmstead =

- U.S. National Register of Historic Places
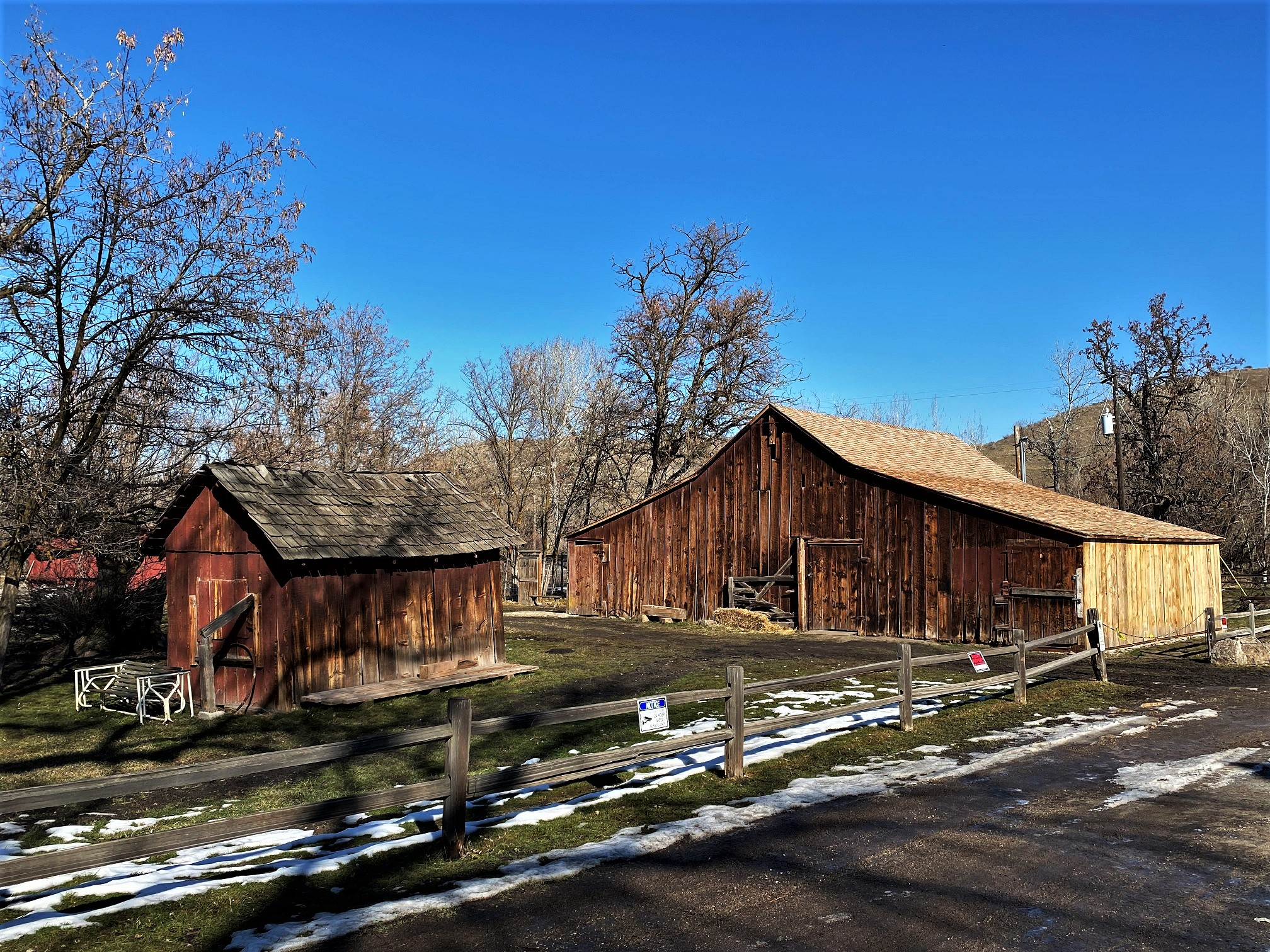

- Location within Idaho Location within the United States
- Location: 5213 Dry Creek Rd. Boise, Idaho
- Coordinates: 43°43′23″N 116°14′53″W
- Area: 1.8 acres (0.73 ha)
- Built: c. 1864–68
- Built by: Philip L. Schick
- Architectural style: Late 19th and Early 20th Century American Movements, Gable-front & wing
- NRHP reference No.: 06000710
- Added to NRHP: August 23, 2006

The Schick–Ostolasa Farmstead in Boise, Idaho is listed on the National Register of Historic Places. The Schick family were German-Russian immigrants to the United States.

The listing includes seven contributing buildings: the Schick/Ostolasa farmhouse, Red House, a root cellar, a wood shed, a saddle barn, a horse barn, and a chicken house, and a non-contributing utility shed. A community barn built in 1997 on the location of former lambing sheds is not included in the listed area. The Schick/Ostolasa Farmhouse was built c.1864-1868, and was extended in 1870 and at other times.

The farmstead was listed on the National Register of Historic Places in 2006.

== See also ==
- Henry Schick Barn, also NRHP-listed in Idaho
