= Henry Schick Barn =

- U.S. National Register of Historic Places
- Location within Idaho Location within the United States
- Location: SE of Buhl, Idaho
- Coordinates: 42°34′46″N 114°42′42″W
- Area: 2.5 acres (1.0 ha)
- Built: 1914
- Built by: Schick, Henry
- MPS: Buhl Dairy Barns TR
- NRHP reference No.: 83000290
- Added to NRHP: September 7, 1983

The Henry Schick Barn, located southeast of Buhl, Idaho, was built in 1914 by Henry Schick, a German-Russian immigrant to the United States. It was listed on the National Register of Historic Places in 1983. The barn features walls and milking stalls that were cast in place in concrete, and custom-made metal onion domes.
