= Deutsche Schule Kiew =

- Kyiv; Ukraine

Information
- Type: German international school
- Principal: Willi Josef Wolfried Wrubel
- Grades: 1 - 12

Deutsche Schule Kiew (DSK; Ukrainian: Німецька школа в Києві, Nimetska shkola v Kiyevi) is a German international school in Kyiv, Ukraine. It is licensed by the relevant Ukrainian educational authorities, accredited and funded by the German Federal Foreign Office, and run by the Central Agency for German Schools Abroad (German: Zentralstelle für das Auslandsschulwesen, ZfA). The school is one of 135 German international schools worldwide.

== Curriculum ==
It serves Grundschule and Gymnasium, i.e. primary through secondary school. Students can choose courses for obtaining Ukrainian or German high school degrees, it is therefore possible to seamlessly switch to and from the educational system in Germany.

== See also ==
- History of Germans in Russia, Ukraine and the Soviet Union
- Ukraine-Germany relations
