= Rudolf Kunze Barn =

- U.S. National Register of Historic Places
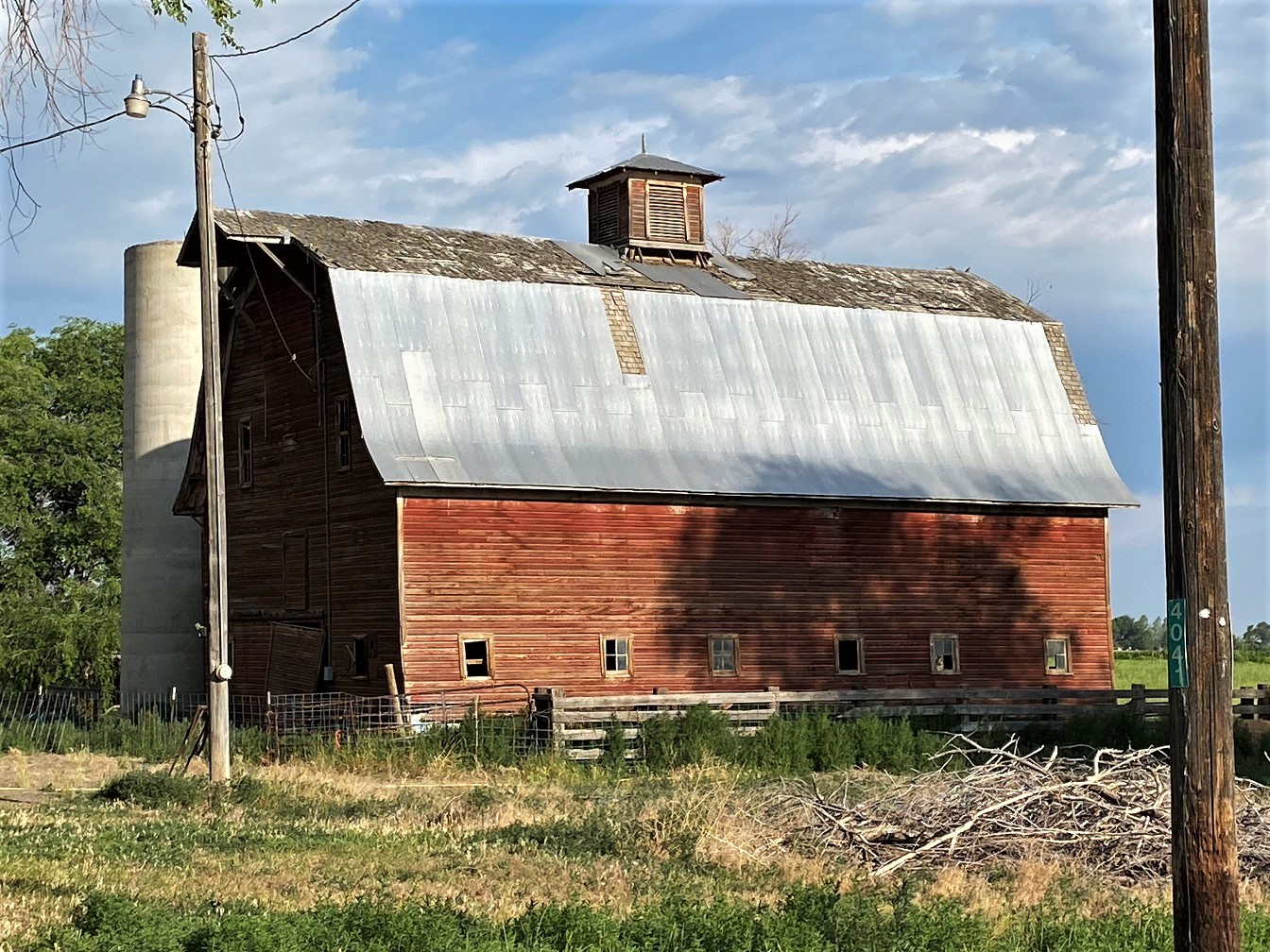

- Location within Idaho Location within the United States
- Nearest city: Buhl, Idaho
- Coordinates: 42.584831°N 114.712679°W
- Area: less than one acre
- Built: 1915
- MPS: Buhl Dairy Barns TR
- NRHP reference No.: 83000292
- Added to NRHP: April 5, 1994

The Rudolf Kunze Barn, in Twin Falls County, Idaho near Buhl, Idaho, was built in 1915. It was listed on the National Register of Historic Places in 1983, then removed in 1989 in a procedural error, then relisted in 1994.

It is a two-story balloon frame gambrel-roofed dairy barn.

It is located about two miles northeast of Buhl.
