= James Alvis House =

Historic house in Idaho, United States

- U.S. National Register of Historic Places
- Location within Idaho Location within the United States
- Location: 1311 Pole Line Rd., Twin Falls, Idaho
- Coordinates: 42°30′44.5″N 114°28′2.7″W
- Area: less than one acre
- Built: 1918
- Built by: Jeremiah H. Bryant
- Architectural style: Bungalow/craftsman
- NRHP reference No.: 80001335
- Added to NRHP: May 23, 1980

The James Alvis House at 1311 Pole Line Rd. in Twin Falls in Twin Falls County, Idaho was built in 1918. It was listed on the National Register of Historic Places in 1980.

It is a 39 by 39 feet (12 m × 12 m) one-and-a-half-story bungalow-style house built of lava rock and light yellow brick. It is an example of Bungalow architecture, with the local variation of use of lava rock. It was built by stonemason Jeremiah H. Bryant. The house was relocated to south Twin Falls in 1994 to make way for the Magic Valley Mall.
