= Achille Duquesne House =

- U.S. National Register of Historic Places
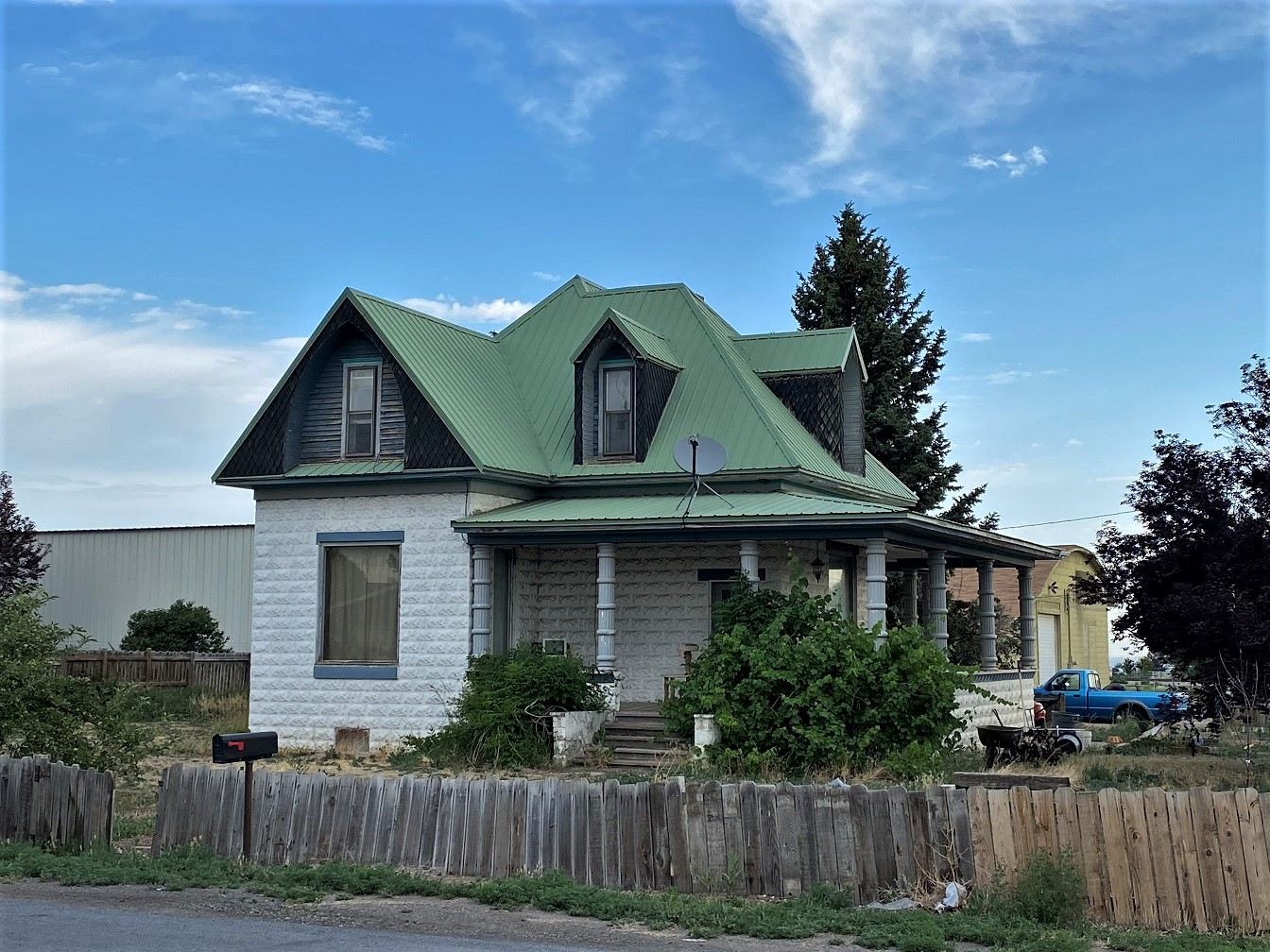

- Location within Idaho Location within the United States
- Location: 710 W. Midway; Filer, Idaho
- Coordinates: 42°34′17″N 114°36′49″W
- Area: less than one acre
- Built: 1912
- Built by: Achille Duquesne
- Architectural style: Queen Anne
- NRHP reference No.: 93000990
- Added to NRHP: September 23, 1993

The Achille Duquesne House, at 710 W. Midway in Filer, Idaho, was built in 1912. It was listed on the National Register of Historic Places in 1993.

It is built of cast concrete blocks with rocklike faces. It has cast stone lintels and window sills. Its design is eclectic, including Gothic Revival-style window surrounds and a Queen Anne-style plan.
