= Union School (Filer, Idaho) =

- U.S. National Register of Historic Places
- Location within Idaho Location within the United States
- Location: 21337 US 30, Filer, Idaho
- Coordinates: 42°33′49″N 114°32′56″W
- Area: less than one acre
- Built: 1914
- MPS: Public School Buildings in Idaho MPS
- NRHP reference No.: 03000123
- Added to NRHP: March 20, 2003

The Union School in Filer, Idaho was built in 1914. It was listed on the National Register of Historic Places in 2003.

In 2002, it was a museum.

An approximately 1 foot (0.30 m) lava rock wall is all that remains of a taller wall built by the Works Progress Administration, separating the parking area.
