= Germans in Belarus =

Ethnic group in Belarus

Belarusian Germans
Belarusdeutsche
- (Germany) (Belarus)

Total population
- 2,474

Regions with significant populations
- Minsk, Hrodna, Polatsk

Languages
- German · Belarusian

Religion
- Lutheran · Roman Catholic

Belarusian Germans (Note: Belarusian: Белару́скія не́мцы Russian: Белору́сские не́мцы German: Weißrusslanddeutsche or Belarusdeutsche) formed a notable ethnic minority on the lands of modern Belarus before World War I.

== History ==
The first German merchants and missionaries, including Bruno of Querfurt, arrived in what is now Belarus in the late 10th and early 11th century. The medieval Duchy of Polotsk had active trade contacts with the Hanseatic League and the city of Polotsk had a notable German community.

Significant numbers of Germans settled in what is now Belarus during the times of the Grand Duchy of Lithuania, the Polish–Lithuanian Commonwealth and after the annexation of the lands by the Russian Empire.

In early 20th century there were close to 50,000 ethnic Germans living in Belarus. Minsk was home to a 2,000-member community of Germans with a Lutheran church and a German-populated area around it.

Germans faced deportations after the beginning of the First World War and during the Soviet repressions in Belarus. After World War II, the historical German communities in Belarus disappeared. A minor number of ethnic Germans from Kazakhstan and Russia migrated to Belarus during World War. A small German expat community emerged after Belarus in 1991.

According to a census conducted in 2009, 2,474 ethnic Germans lived in Belarus. There are Lutheran church buildings in Grodno and Polotsk. A sign commemorating the German community of Minsk was opened in May 2019.

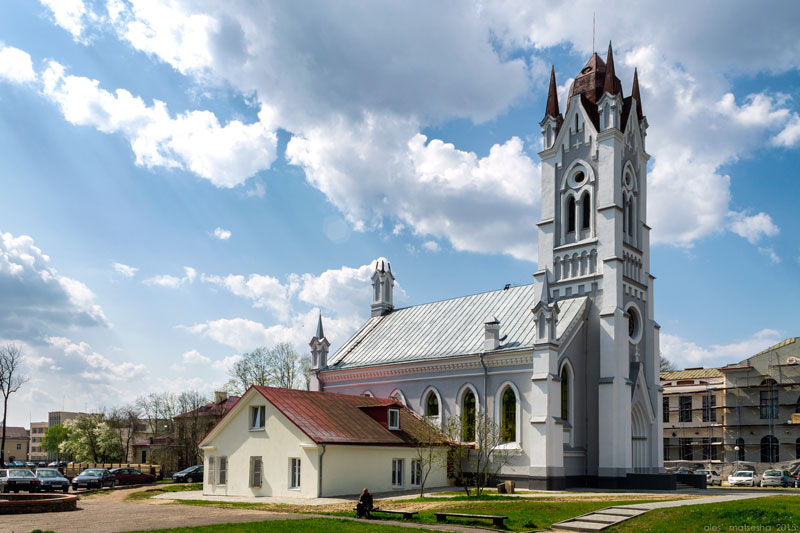
Lutheran church in Grodno, one of the few active Lutheran churches in Belarus

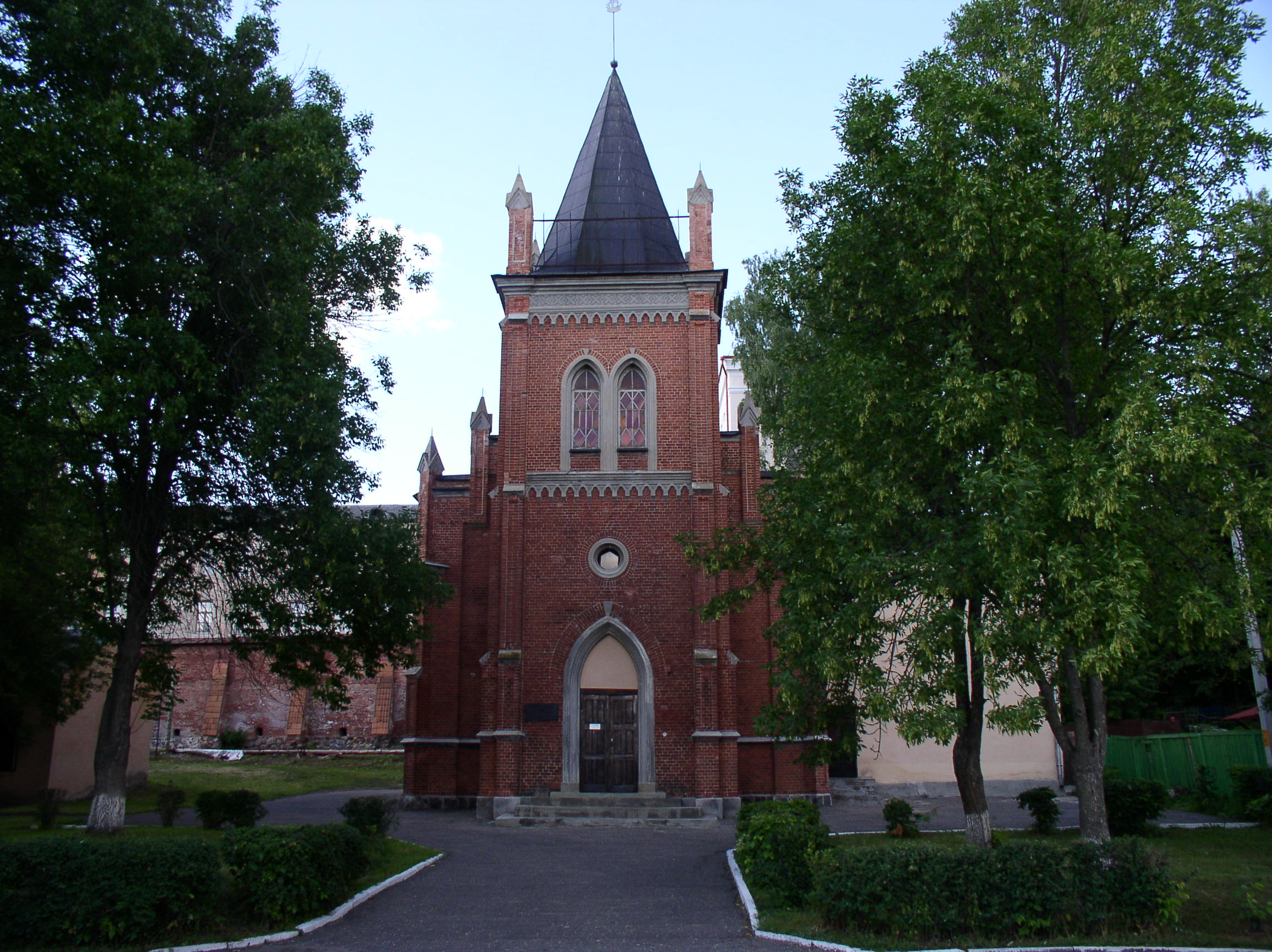
Former Lutheran church in Polotsk

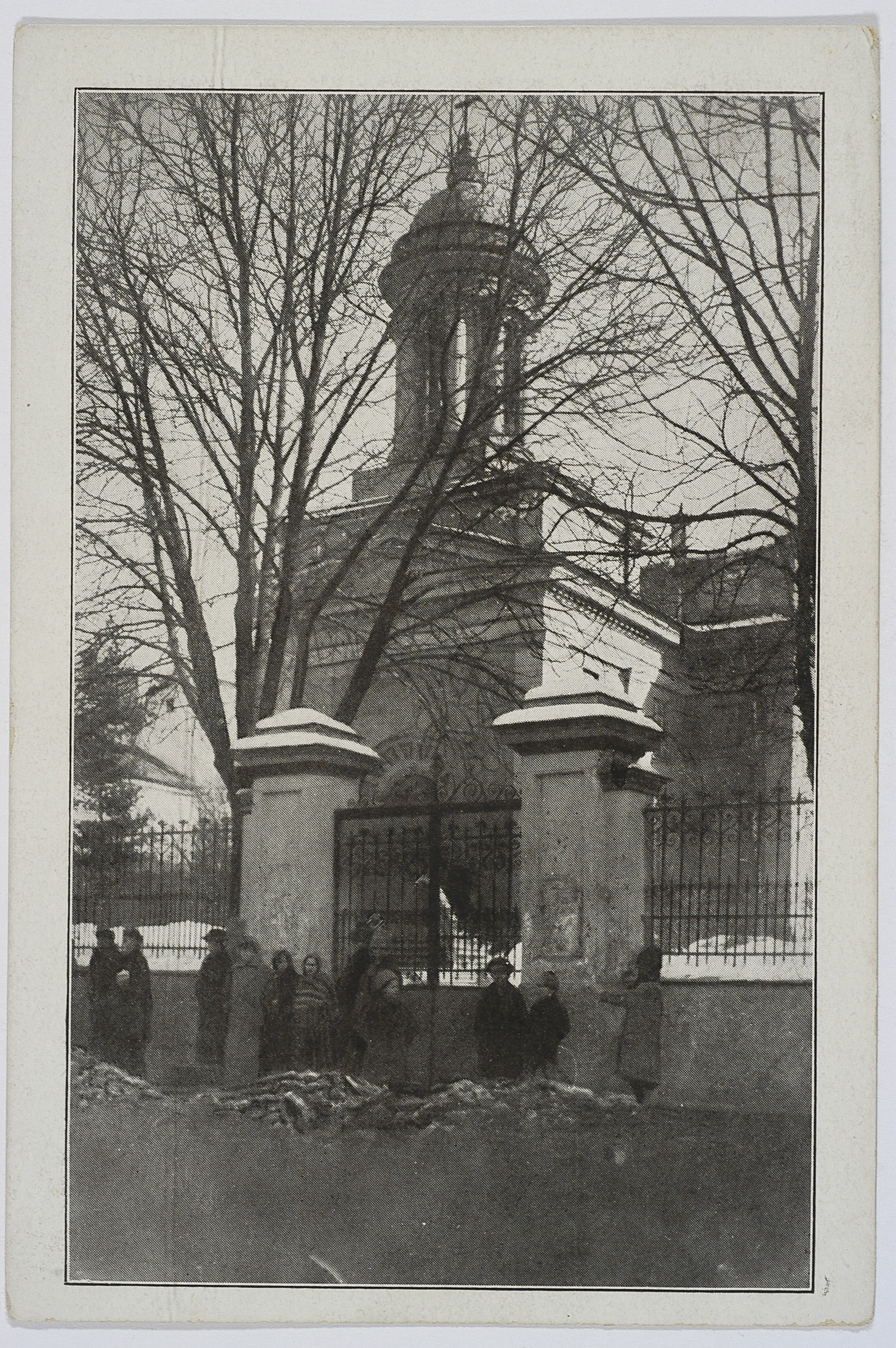
Lutheran church in Minsk (destroyed by Soviet authorities)

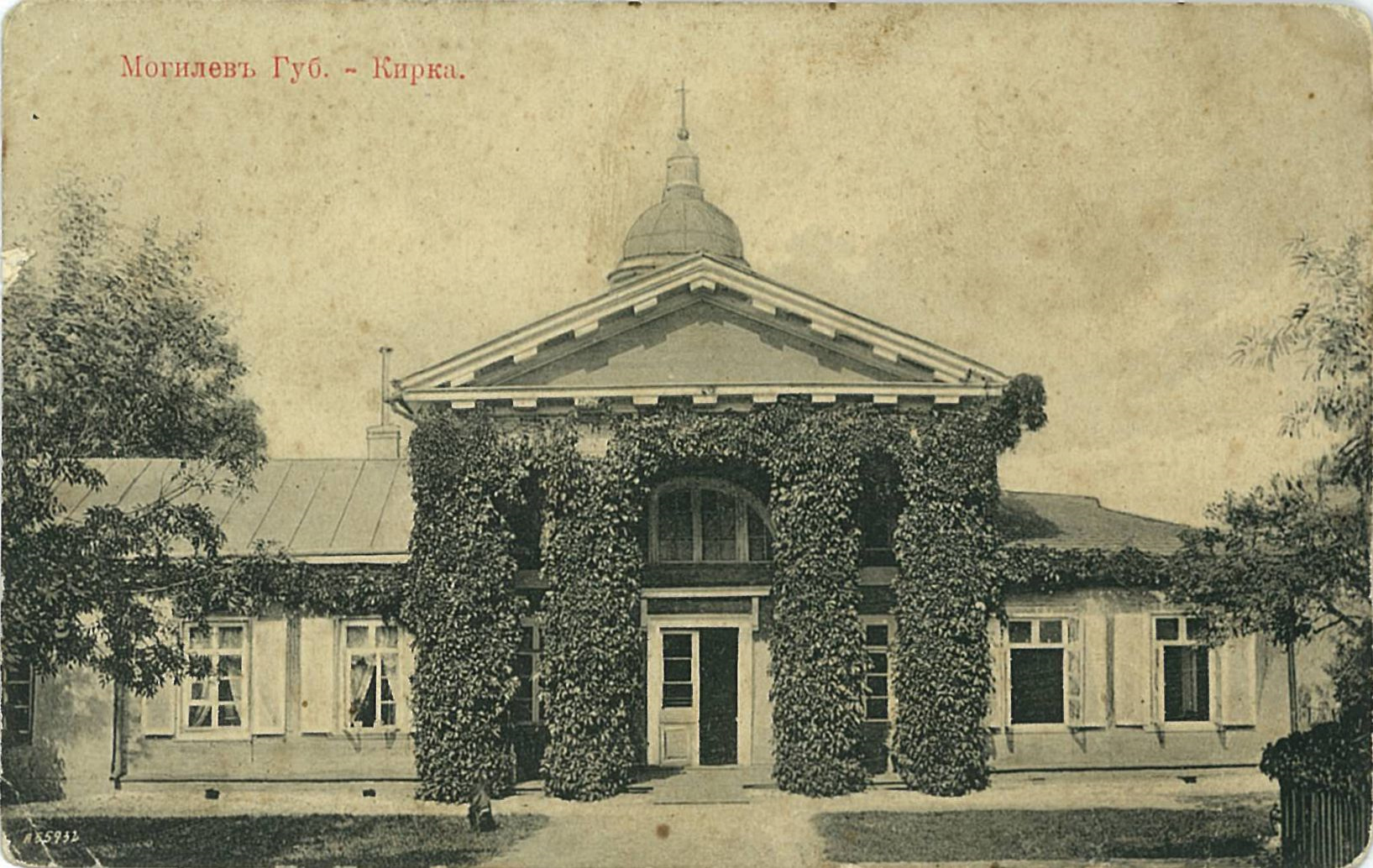
Lutheran church in Mogilev (destroyed by Soviet authorities)

== Notable Belarusian Germans ==
- Otto Schmidt, Soviet scientist and statesman
- Barys Hiunter, member of the Supreme Soviet of Belarus from the Belarusian Popular Front, of Volga German origin
- Juliana Menke, activist of the Belarusian national revival movement, from a Lithuanian German family
- Eduard von der Ropp, Roman Catholic archbishop of Mahiliou from 1917 to 1939, one of the advocates of the introduction of the Belarusian language in the Catholic Church in Belarus
- Antoni Tyzenhauz, statesman in the Polish-Lithuanian Commonwealth in the 18th century, Court Treasurer of the Grand Duchy of Lithuania, Starosta of Hrodna, and administrator of royal estates
- Lavon Volski, rock musician of German descent

== See also ==
- Belarus–Germany relations
