= Magic Valley Mall =

Coordinates: 42°35′38″N 114°27′18″W

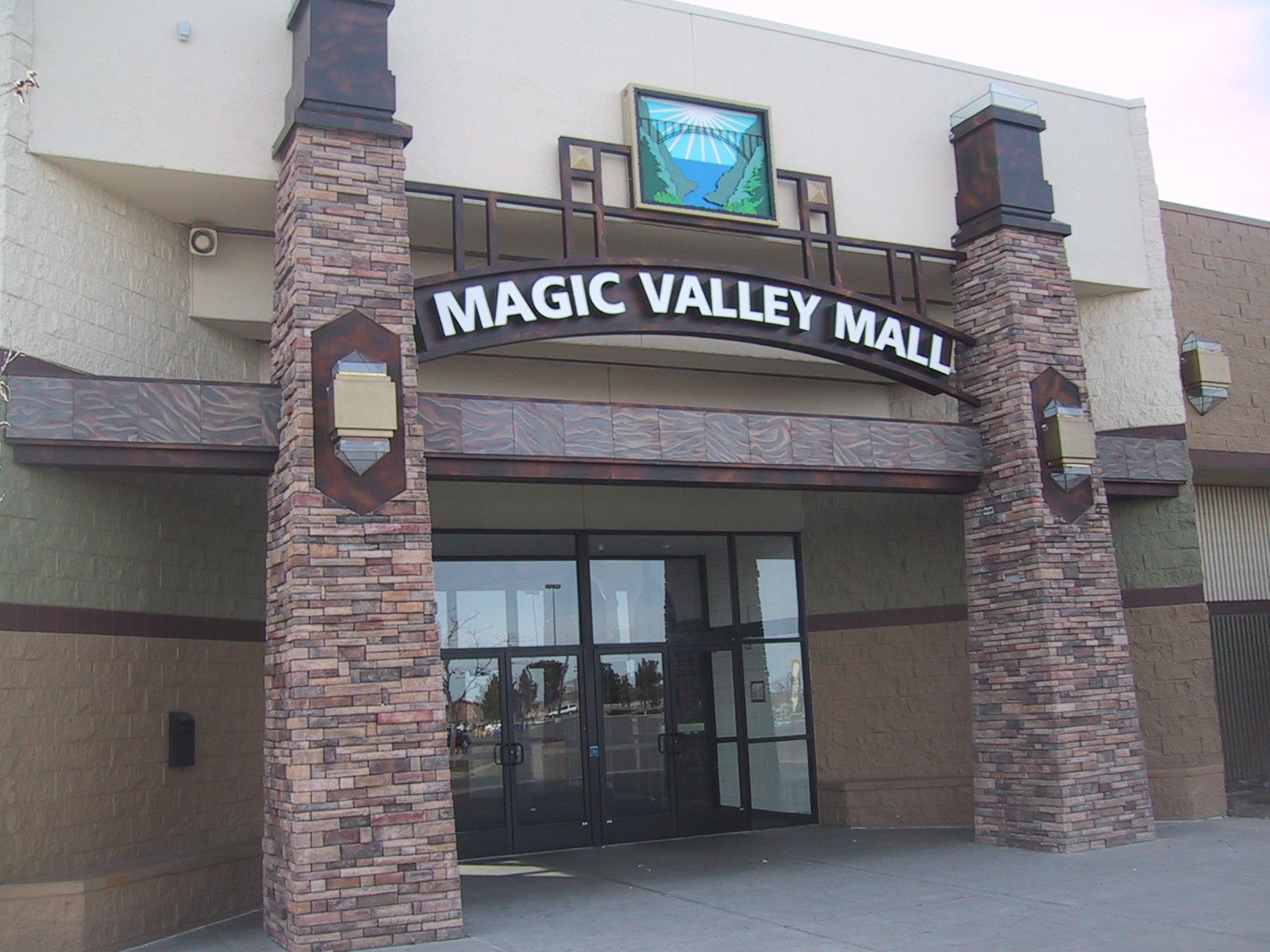
- Location: Twin Falls, Idaho
- Address: 1485 East Pole Line Road, Twin Falls, ID 83301
- Opened: October 29, 1986
- Developer: Price Development Corporation
- Owner: Woodbury Corporation
- Num. of stores: 63
- Num. of anchor tenants: 5 (4 open, 1 vacant)
- Floor area: 413,000 square feet (38,400 m^{2})
- Floors: 1
- Parking: 2,324 spaces
- Website: www.magicvalleymall.com

Magic Valley Mall is an enclosed shopping mall located in Twin Falls, Idaho. The mall originally opened on October 29, 1986 with JCPenney and Shopko as anchor tenants. Today, the mall is anchored by JCPenney, Hobby Lobby, Kohl's, and Magic Valley Cinema 13.

== History ==
=== Development and opening ===
In February 1979, Lewis Douglas Co. proposed plans for a shopping mall in Twin Falls on land owned by farmer Oren Boone located at the northeast corner of Blue Lakes Boulevard and Pole Line Road. In March 1980, General Growth Properties purchased the site from Lewis Douglas Co. and announced plans for Canyon Ridge Mall. The proposed 512,000 to 700,000 square-foot mall would consist of four department stores and 90 specialty stores with a completion date of fall 1982 or early 1983. At the same time, Woodbury Corporation announced plans to separate shopping mall across from Canyon Ridge Mall on the west side of Blue Lakes Boulevard. By May 1980, zoning changes were approved to allow construction of both shopping malls.

In February 1981, a third mall, developed by Price Development Corporation, received zoning change to construct on a 30-acre site south of the Canyon Ridge Mall site on Pole Line Road. After facing opposition from the nearby Green Acres housing subdivision, Twin Falls City Council denied the zoning change, which triggered a two-year court battle between the city and Price. In September 1983, Price abandoned its original plan and acquired the Canyon River Mall site from General Growth Properties. Price's new plans called for a smaller 450,000 square-feet mall with four department stores. Twin Falls City Council approved the development in February 1984. In May 1984, a spokesman for Price confirmed it was courting The Bon Marché, JCPenney, and ZCMI to anchor the shopping mall. ZCMI was ruled out as a potential anchor in March 1985. Two months later, Shopko announced plans to anchor the new mall, now named Magic Valley Mall, as part of a plan to open six stores in Idaho. The Bon Marché and JCPenney were later confirmed to relocate from downtown Twin Falls to the mall. JCPenney also announced the closure of a store in Jerome as part of its plan to open at the mall. Price Development broke ground on Magic Valley Mall on August 21, 1985. The mall's first tenant, Shopko, opened on October 13, 1986, with JCPenney and other smaller tenants opening on October 29. The Bon Marché opened on July 30, 1987.

=== Later additions ===
In November 1988, Sears announced plans to relocate from downtown Twin Falls to the mall. The store opened on August 2, 1989. A fifth anchor tenant, Lamonts, was added to the mall in February 1992, but closed in December 1996. In 1995, a strip mall was built next to the mall with Barnes & Noble as an anchor. In September 1998, Reel Theaters opened a six-screen discount movie theater in the space formerly occupied by Lamonts. The theater was sold to Interstate Amusements in May 2000 and renamed Odyssey Theater. In August 2003, The Bon Marché was renamed Bon-Macy's and became a full-fledged Macy's in January 2005.

In March 2011, Cinema West announced to plans replace the Odyssey Theater with a new, larger cinema complex. Odyssey Theater was shut down in September 2011, with the new Magic Valley Cinema 13 opening in May 2012. On August 1, 2017, Macy's announced it would not renew its lease at the mall and shut down in early 2018. On January 4, 2018, Sears announced it would close its store at the mall in April. The Macy's store was replaced by Hobby Lobby in September 2018. On February 6, 2019, Shopko announced it would close on May 12, 2019. On August 5, 2019, Kohl's confirmed it will open a store in the former Sears building. The store opened on May 11, 2020.
