= History of Germans in Russia, Ukraine, and the Soviet Union =

Germans from Russia Russlanddeutsche Российские немцы
Total population
- ~3 million

Regions with significant populations
- Germany: ~2.3 million
- Kazakhstan: 226,092 (2021)
- Russia: 195,256 (2021)
- Ukraine: 33,302 (2001)

Languages
- German, Russian, Ukrainian, Kazakh

Religion
- Historically: Lutheran majority Catholic minority Currently: Lutheran majority Baptist, Pentecostal and Catholic minorities

Related ethnic groups
- Volga Germans, Germans in Kazakhstan, Baltic Germans, Black Sea Germans, Germans in Belarus, Estonian Swedes

The German minority population in Russia, Ukraine, and the Soviet Union stemmed from several sources and arrived in several waves. Since the second half of the 19th century, as a consequence of the Russification policies and compulsory military service in the Russian Empire, large groups of Germans from Russia emigrated to the Americas (mainly Canada, the United States, Brazil and Argentina), where they founded many towns. During World War II, ethnic Germans in the Soviet Union were persecuted and many were forcibly resettled to other regions such as Central Asia. In 1989, the Soviet Union declared an ethnic German population of roughly two million. By 2002, following the collapse of the Soviet Union in 1991, many ethnic Germans had emigrated (mainly to Germany) and the population fell by half to roughly one million. 597,212 Germans self-identified as such in the 2002 Russian census, making Germans the fifth-largest ethnic group in the Russian Federation. There were 353,441 Germans in Kazakhstan and 21,472 in Kyrgyzstan (1999); while 33,300 Germans lived in Ukraine (2001 census).

Emigrants from Germany first arrived in Kievan Rus during the reign of Olga of Kiev. The Germans of Russia did not necessarily speak Russian; many spoke German, while French was often used as the language of the high aristocracy. Depending on geography and other circumstances, many Russian Germans spoke Russian as their first or second language. The large numbers of farmers and village tradesmen who arrived following Catherine the Great's invitation were allowed to settle in German-only villages and to keep their German language, religion, and culture until the 1920s.

Today's ethnic Germans who inhabit lands of the former Soviet Union speak mostly Russian, as they are in the gradual process of assimilation. As such, many may not necessarily be fluent in German. Consequently, Germany has recently strictly limited their repatriation. In addition, Kazakhstan Germans from Kazakhstan are moving to Russia rather than Germany. As conditions for Germans in Russia generally deteriorated in the late 19th century and early 20th century during the period of unrest and revolution, many ethnic Germans migrated from Russia to the Americas and elsewhere. They became collectively known as Germans from Russia.

== Germans in Imperial Russia (partitioned Poland and Caucasus) ==
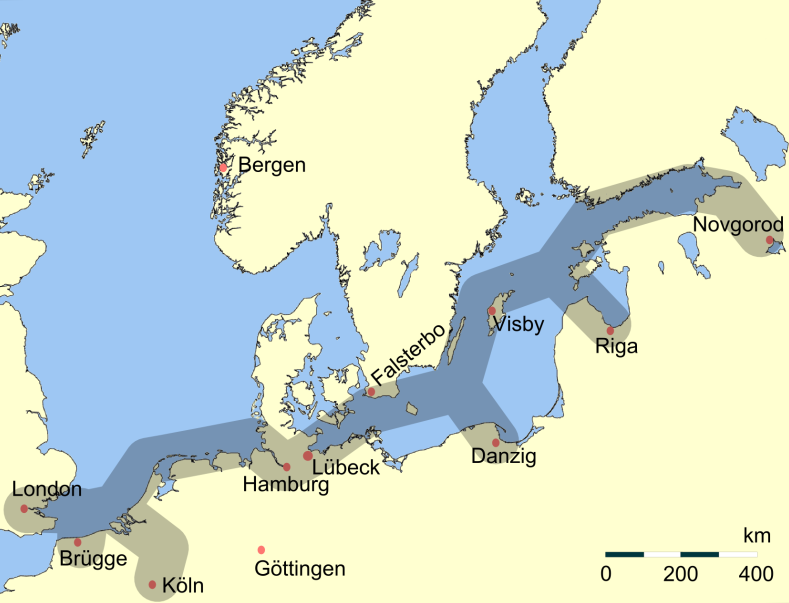
Main trading routes of the Hanseatic League

German merchants established a trading post at Novgorod, which they called Peterhof. In 1229, German merchants at Novgorod were granted certain privileges that made their positions more secure.

The earliest German settlement in Moscow dates to the reign of Vasili III, Grand Prince of Moscow, from 1505 to 1533. A handful of German and Dutch craftsmen and traders were allowed to settle in Moscow's German Quarter (Немецкая слобода, or Nemetskaya sloboda), as they provided essential technical skills in the capital. Gradually, this policy extended to a few other major cities. In 1682, Moscow had about 200,000 citizens; some 18,000 were classified as Nemtsy, which means either "German" or "western foreigner".

The international community located in the German Quarter greatly influenced Peter the Great (reigned 1682–1725). His efforts to transform Russia into a more modern European state are believed to have derived in large part from his experiences among Russia's established Germans. By the late 17th century, foreigners were no longer so rare in Russian cities, and Moscow's German Quarter had lost its ethnic character by the end of that century.

=== Vistula Germans (Poland) ===
Through wars and the partitions of Poland, Prussia acquired an increasing amount of northern, western, and central Polish territory. The Vistula River flows south to north, with its mouth on the Baltic Sea near Danzig (now Gdańsk). Germans and Dutch settled its valley beginning at the sea coast and gradually moving further south to the interior. Eventually, Prussia acquired most of the Vistula's watershed, and the central portion of then-Poland became South Prussia. Its existence was brief - 1793 to 1806, but by its end many German settlers had established Protestant agricultural settlements within its earlier borders. By contrast, most Polish were Roman Catholics. Some German Roman Catholics also entered the region from the southwest, especially the area of Prussian Silesia. The 1935 "Breyer Map" shows the distribution of German settlements in what became central Poland.

Napoleon's victories ended the short existence of South Prussia. The French Emperor incorporated that and other territories into the Duchy of Warsaw. After Napoleon's defeat in 1815, however, the Duchy was divided. Prussia annexed the western Posen region, and what is now central Poland became the Russian client-state known as Congress Poland. Many Germans continued to live in this central region, maintaining their middle-German Prussian dialect, similar to the Silesian dialect, and their Protestant and Catholic religions. (The Russian population was primarily Russian Orthodox, which was the established national church.)

During both World Wars, the eastern front was fought over in this area. The Soviet government increased the conscription of young men. The rate of Vistula Germans' migrations to this area from Congress Poland increased. Some became Polonized, however, and their descendants remain in Poland.

During the last year of and after World War II, many ethnic Germans fled or were forcibly expelled by the Russians and the Poles from Eastern Europe, particularly those who had maintained their German language and separate religions. The Russians and Poles blamed them for being allies of the Nazis and the reason that Nazi Germany had invaded the East in its program of lebensraum. The Germans were also held to have abused the native populations in internal warfare, allied with the Germans during their occupation. Under the Potsdam Agreement, major population transfers were agreed to by the Allies. The deportees generally lost all their property and were often attacked during their deportations. Those who survived joined millions of other displaced peoples on the road after the war.

=== Volga Germans (Russia) ===
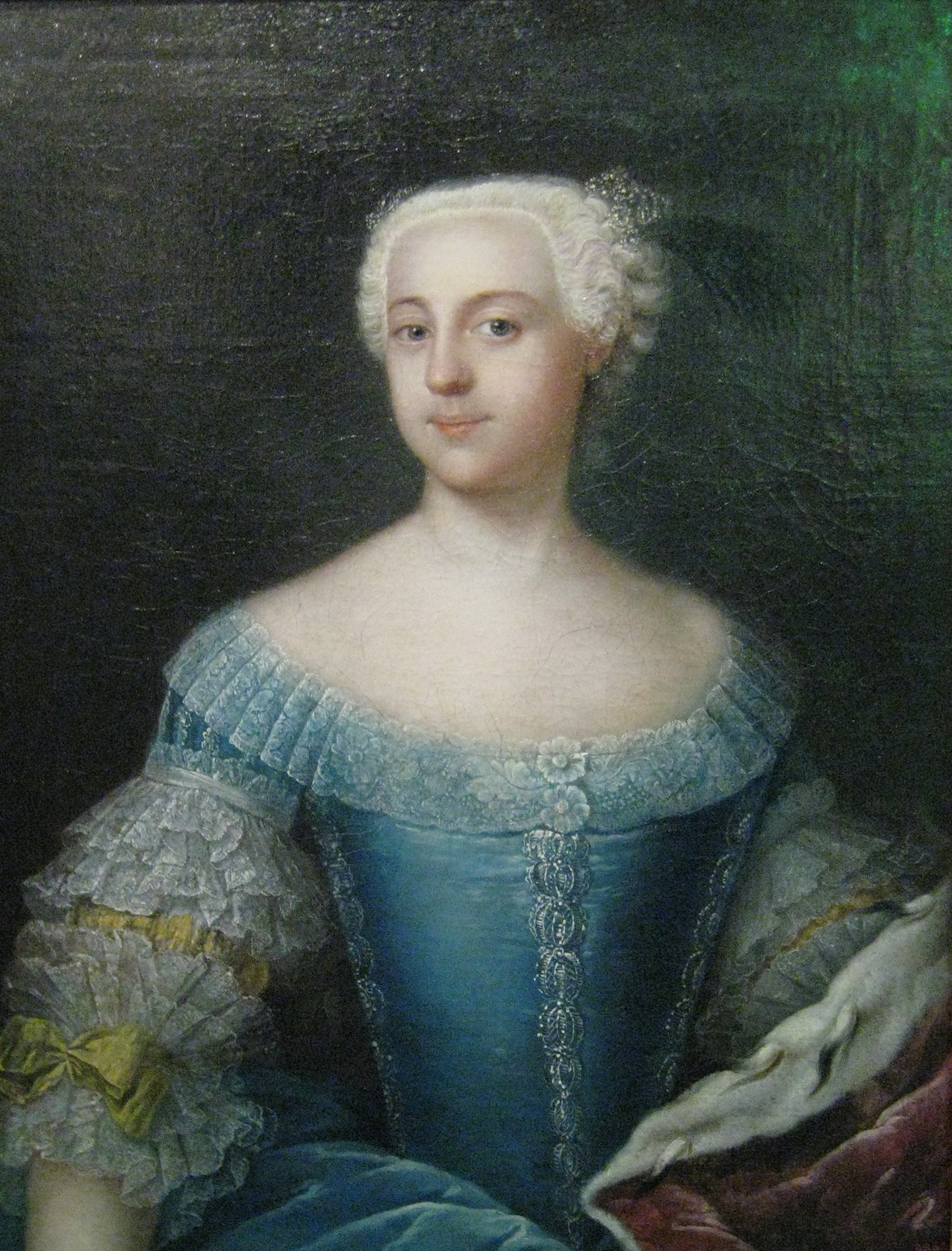
Catherine the Great - the most famous Russian Empress of German descent

Czarina Catherine II was German, born in Stettin in Pomerania (now Szczecin in Poland). After gaining her power, she proclaimed open immigration for foreigners wishing to live in the Russian Empire on 22 July 1763, marking the beginning of a wave of German migration to the Empire. She wanted German farmers to redevelop farmland that had been fallow after conflict with the Ottomans. German colonies were founded in the lower Volga river area almost immediately afterward. These early colonies were attacked during the Pugachev uprising, which was centred on the Volga area, but they survived the rebellion.

German immigration was motivated in part by religious intolerance and warfare in central Europe, as well as by frequently difficult economic conditions, particularly among the southern principalities. Catherine II's declaration freed German immigrants from requirements for military service (which was imposed on native Russians) and from most taxes. It placed the new arrivals outside of Russia's feudal hierarchy and granted them considerable internal autonomy. Moving to Russia gave German immigrants political rights that they would not have possessed in their own lands. Religious minorities found these terms very agreeable, particularly Mennonites from the Vistula River valley. Their unwillingness to participate in military service, and their long tradition of dissent from mainstream Lutheranism and Calvinism, made life under the Hohenzollerns very difficult for them. Nearly all of the Prussian Mennonites emigrated to Russia over the following century, leaving no more than a handful in Prussia.

Other German minority churches took advantage of Catherine II's offer as well, particularly Evangelical Christians such as the Baptists. Although Catherine's declaration forbade them from proselytizing among members of the Orthodox Church, they could evangelize Russia's Muslim and other non-Christian minorities.

German colonization was most intense in the Lower Volga, but other areas also received immigrants. Many settled in the area around the Black Sea, and the Mennonites favoured the lower Dnieper river area, around Ekaterinoslav (now Dnipro) and Aleksandrovsk (now Zaporizhia).

In 1803, Catherine II's grandson, Tsar Alexander I, reissued her proclamation. In the chaos of the Napoleonic wars, Germans responded in great numbers, fleeing their war-torn land. The Tsar's administration eventually imposed minimum financial requirements on new immigrants, requiring them to have either 300 gulden in cash or special skills in order to be accepted for entry to Russia.

The abolition of serfdom in the Russian Empire in 1861 created a shortage of labour in agriculture. The need for workers attracted new German immigration, particularly from the increasingly crowded central European states. There was no longer enough fertile land there for full employment in agriculture.

Geographic distribution of German language in the Russian Empire according to 1897 census

Furthermore, a sizable portion of Russia's ethnic Germans migrated into Russia from its Polish possessions. The 18th-century partitions of Poland (1772–1795) dismantled the Polish-Lithuanian state, dividing it among Austria, Prussia and Russia. Many Germans already living in those parts of Poland transferred to Russia, dating back to medieval and later migrations. Many Germans in Congress Poland migrated further east into Russia between then and World War I, particularly in the aftermath of the Polish insurrection of 1830. The Polish insurrection in 1863 added a new wave of German emigration from Poland to those who had already moved east, and led to the founding of extensive German colonies in Volhynia. When Poland reclaimed its independence in 1918 after World War I, it ceased to be a source of German emigration to Russia, but by then many hundreds of thousands of Germans had already settled in enclaves across the Russian Empire.

Germans settled in the Caucasus area from the beginning of the 19th century and in the 1850s expanded into the Crimea. In the 1890s, new German colonies opened in the Altay mountain area in Russian Asia (see Mennonite settlements of Altai). German colonial areas continued to expand in Ukraine as late as the beginning of World War I.

According to the first census of the Russian Empire in 1897, about 1.8 million respondents reported German as their mother tongue.

=== Black Sea Germans (Moldova and Ukraine) ===
The Black Sea Germans - including the Bessarabian Germans and the Dobrujan Germans - settled the territories of the northern bank of the Black Sea in present-day Ukraine in the late 18th and the 19th century. Catherine the Great had gained this land for Russia through her two wars with the Ottoman Empire (1768–1774) and from the annexation of the Crimean Khanates (1783).

The area of settlement did not develop as compactly as that of the Volga territory, and a chain of ethnic German colonies resulted. The first German settlers arrived in 1787, first from West Prussia, followed by immigrants from Western and Southwestern Germany (including Roman Catholics), and from the Warsaw area. Also many Germans, beginning in 1803, immigrated from the northeastern area of Alsace west of the Rhine River. They settled roughly 30 miles northeast of Odesa (city) in Ukraine, forming several enclaves that quickly expanded, resulting in daughter colonies springing up nearby.

Crimea

From 1783 onward the Crown initiated a systematic settlement of Russians, Ukrainians, and Germans in the Crimean Peninsula (in what was then the Crimean Khanate) in order to dilute the native population of the Crimean Tatars.

In 1939, around 60,000 of the 1.1 million inhabitants of Crimea were ethnic German. Two years later, following the end of the alliance and the Nazi German invasion of the Soviet Union, the government deported ethnic Germans from the Crimea to Central Asia in the Soviet Union's program of population transfers. Conditions were harsh and many of the deportees died. It was not until the period of Perestroika in the late 1980s that the government granted surviving ethnic Germans and their descendants the right to return from Central Asia to the peninsula.

=== Volhynian Germans (Poland and Ukraine) ===
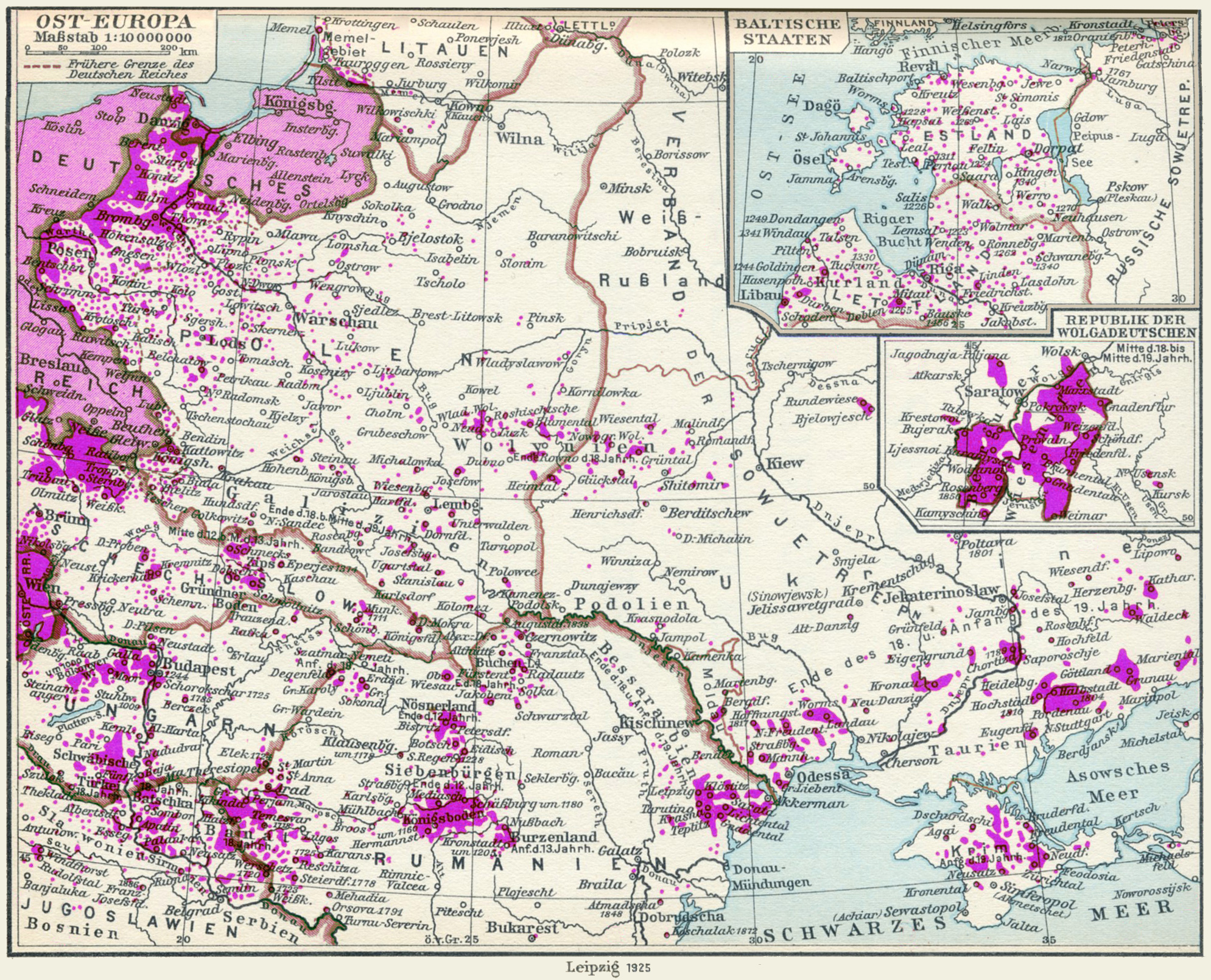
Germans in East Europe, 1925

The migration of Germans into Volhynia (as of 2013 covering northwestern Ukraine from a short distance west of Kiev to the border with Poland) occurred under significantly different conditions than those described above. By the end of the 19th century, Volhynia had more than 200,000 German settlers. Their migration began was encouraged by local noblemen, often Polish landlords, who wanted to develop their significant land-holdings in the area for agricultural use. Probably 75% or more of the Germans came from Congress Poland, with the balance coming directly from other regions such as East and West Prussia, Pomerania, Posen, Württemberg, and Galicia, among others.

Shortly after 1800, the first German families started moving into the area. A surge occurred after the first Polish rebellion of 1831 but by 1850, Germans still numbered only about 5000. The largest migration came after the second Polish rebellion of 1863, and Germans began to flood into the area by the thousands. By 1900 they numbered about 200,000. The vast majority of these Germans were Protestant Lutherans (in Europe they were referred to as Evangelicals). Limited numbers of Mennonites from the lower Vistula River region settled in the south part of Volhynia. Baptists and Moravian Brethren settled mostly northwest of Zhitomir. Another major difference between the Germans here and in other parts of Russia is that the other Germans tended to settle in larger communities. The Germans in Volhynia were scattered about in over 1400 villages. Though the population peaked in 1900, many Germans had already begun leaving Volhynia in the late 1880s for North and South America.

Between 1911 and 1915, a small group of Volhynian German farmers (36 families - more than 200 people were relocated to Eastern Siberia. They also were instructed that they would now be official citizens of Russia, including the requirement of military service and contribution of taxes. They were able to also make use of the resettlement subsidies of the government's Stolypin reform of 1906–1911. They settled in three villages (Pikhtinsk, Sredne-Pikhtinsk, and Dagnik) in what is today Zalarinsky District of Irkutsk Oblast, where they became known as the "Bug Hollanders". They apparently were not using the German language anymore, but rather spoke Ukrainian and Polish. They used Lutheran Bibles that had been printed in East Prussia, in the Polish form known as fraktur. Their descendants, many with German surnames, continue to live in the district into the 21st century.

=== Caucasus Germans ===
A German minority of about 100,000 people existed in the Caucasus region, in areas such as the North Caucasus, Georgia, and Azerbaijan. In 1941 Joseph Stalin ordered all inhabitants with a German father to be deported, mostly to Siberia or Kazakhstan.

== Mass emigration of Germans from Russia to the Americas, 1870s to 1910s ==
Prior to the 1870s, the Germans in Russia had enjoyed a unique ability to preserve their heritage and independence. Along with the freedoms from Russian military service or taxes, their colonies continued to speak their mother tongue of German, their children were taught in German classrooms, and they could practice their faith in peace. However, when Czar Alexander II came to power he changed this. In 1871 he rescinded most of the freedoms the Germans had been granted by Catherine II and Alexander I since first settling. Military service was required of all men of a certain age starting in 1874. This left the colonists with the loss of their men and reduced income, reducing their socioeconomic level down to the level of Russian peasants. As Czar Alexander III came to power, this move toward “Russification” of the Germans continued with his work to eliminate the use of the German language.

Many Germans, discouraged by the elimination of privileges they had been promised, chose to emigrate. The Germans from Russia who emigrated to different countries of the Americas at the end of the 19th century, unlike those who remained in the Russian Empire, were able to avoid Russification, preserving their ancestral German culture.

=== North America ===
Numerous people with German heritage who lived on the Great Plains of North America had ancestors who emigrated from the Russian Empire, and not modern-day Germany. The Canadian Encyclopedia states simply: "Canada's main source of Germans was Russia — especially from the Volga, the Black Sea coast and Volhynia." The Encyclopedia of the Great Plains says that "between 1873 and 1914 approximately 115,000 German Russians immigrated to the United States and about 150,000 to western Canada" and "it is estimated[...] that by 1910 approximately 44 percent of all German settlers in western Canada were Germans from Russia."

=== South America ===
==== Brazil ====
By 1876, the Empire of Brazil, now Brazil, was a monarchy and Pedro II invited the Volga Germans and other Germans from Russia to populate his territory. From then on, waves of German immigrants settled in the states of São Paulo, Paraná, Santa Catarina and Río Grande do Sul.

==== Argentina ====
Germans from Russia, especially Volga Germans, founded many colonies in Argentina, mainly in the south of Buenos Aires Province, Entre Ríos Province and La Pampa Province. These colonies maintain their culture to this day and organize different festivals (Kerb, Kreppelfest, Schlachtfest, etc.) in which they welcome the rest of the country's population. The total number of Volga German descendants in Argentina is estimated at more than two million inhabitants.

== Decline of the Russian Germans ==
The decline of the Russian German community started with the reforms of Alexander II. In 1871, he repealed the open-door immigration policy of his ancestors, effectively ending any new German immigration into the Empire. Although the German colonies continued to expand, they were driven by natural growth and by the immigration of Germans from Poland.

The Russian nationalism that took root under Alexander II served as a justification for eliminating in 1871 the bulk of the tax privileges enjoyed by Russian Germans, and after 1874 they were subjected to military service. Only after long negotiations, Mennonites, traditionally a pacifist denomination, were allowed to serve alternative service in the form of work in forestry and the medical corps. The resulting disaffection motivated many Russian Germans, especially members of traditionally dissenting Protestant churches, to migrate to the United States and Canada, while many Catholics chose Brazil and Argentina. They moved primarily to the American Great Plains and western Canada, especially North Dakota, South Dakota, Nebraska, Kansas, and Colorado; to Canada Manitoba and Saskatchewan, and Alberta; to Brazil, especially Paraná, Santa Catarina and Rio Grande do Sul; and to Argentina, especially South of Buenos Aires Province, Entre Ríos Province and La Pampa Province. North Dakota and South Dakota attracted primarily Odesa (Black Sea area) Germans from Russia while Nebraska and Kansas attracted mainly Volga Germans from Russia. The majority of Volhynia Germans chose Canada as their destination with significant numbers later migrating to the United States. Smaller settlement pockets also occurred in other regions such as Volga and Volhynian Germans in southwestern Michigan, Volhynian Germans in Wisconsin, and Congress Poland and Volhynian Germans in Connecticut.

After 1881, Russian Germans were required to study Russian in school and lost all their remaining special privileges. Many Germans remained in Russia, particularly those who had done well as Russia began to industrialise in the late 19th century. Russian Germans were disproportionately represented among Russia's engineers, technical tradesmen, industrialists, financiers and large landowners.

World War I was the first time Russia went to war against Germany since the Napoleonic era, and Russian Germans were quickly suspected of having enemy sympathies. The Germans living in the Volhynia area were deported to the German colonies in the lower Volga river in 1915 when Russia started losing the war. Many Russian Germans were exiled to Siberia by the Tsar's government as enemies of the state – generally without trial or evidence. In 1916, an order was issued to deport the Volga Germans to the east as well, but the Russian Revolution prevented this from being carried out.

The loyalties of Russian Germans during the revolution varied. While many supported the royalist forces and joined the White Army, others were committed to Alexander Kerensky's Provisional Government, to the Bolsheviks, and even to smaller forces like Nestor Makhno's. Russian Germans — including Mennonites and Evangelicals — fought on all sides in the Russian Revolution and Civil War. Although some Russian Germans were very wealthy, others were quite poor and sympathised strongly with their Slavic neighbours. Educated Russian Germans were just as likely to have leftist and revolutionary sympathies as the ethnically Russian intelligentsia.

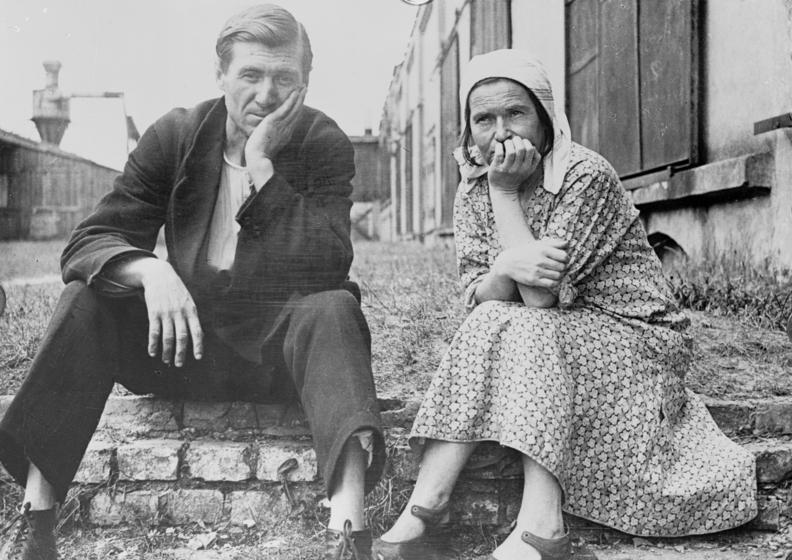
1920, a German farmer couple from the Volga region in the refugee camp Schneidemühl, Posen-West Prussia (now Piła, Poland)

In the chaos of the Russian Revolution and the civil war that followed it, many ethnic Germans were displaced within Russia or emigrated from Russia altogether. The chaos surrounding the Russian Civil War was devastating to many German communities, particularly to religious dissenters like the Mennonites. Many Mennonites hold the forces of Nestor Makhno in Ukraine particularly responsible for large-scale violence against their community.

This period was also one of regular food shortages, caused by famine and the lack of long-distance transportation of food during the fighting. Coupled with the typhus epidemic and famine of the early 1920s, as many as a third of Russia's Germans may have perished. Russian German organisations in the Americas, particularly the Mennonite Central Committee, organised famine relief in Russia in the late 1920s. As the chaos faded and the Soviet Union's position became more secure, many Russian Germans simply took advantage of the end of the fighting to emigrate to the Americas. Emigration from the Soviet Union came to a halt in 1929 by Stalin's decree, leaving roughly one million Russian Germans within Soviet borders.

The Soviet Union seized the farms and businesses of Russian Germans, along with all other farms and businesses, when Stalin ended Vladimir Lenin's New Economic Policy in 1929 and began the forced collectivization of agriculture and liquidation of large land holdings.

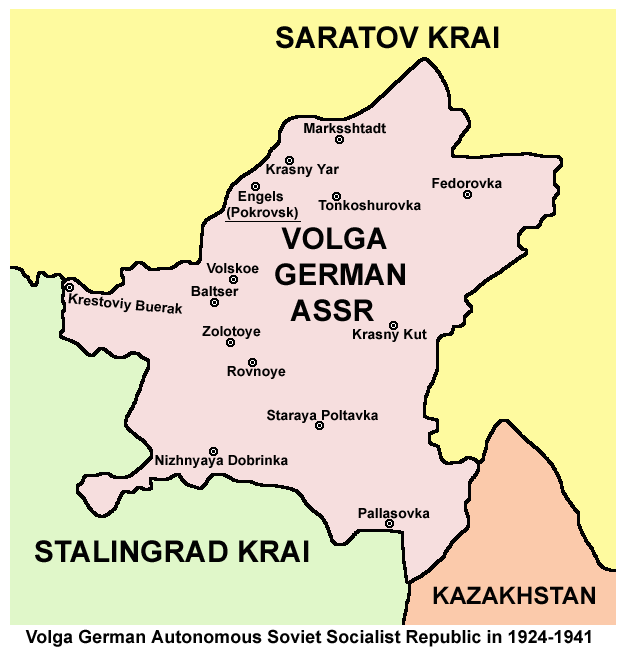
Volga German Autonomous Soviet Socialist Republic, 1924–1941

Nonetheless, Soviet nationalities policy had, to some degree, restored the institutions of Russian Germans in some areas. In July 1924, the Volga German Autonomous Soviet Socialist Republic was founded, giving the Volga Germans some autonomous German-language institutions. Several ethnic German national raions were all so set up in the 1920s in Ukraine, Crimea, north Caucasus, Georgia, Orenburg and Siberia. The Lutheran church, like nearly all religious affiliations in Russia, was ruthlessly suppressed under Stalin. But, for the 600,000-odd Germans living in the Volga German ASSR, German was the language of local officials for the first time since 1881.

As a result of the German invasion of the Soviet Union on 22 June 1941, Stalin decided to deport the German Russians to internal exile and forced labor in Siberia and Central Asia. It is evident that, at this point, the regime considered national minorities with ethnic ties to foreign states, such as Germans, potential fifth columnists. On 12 August 1941, the Central Committee of the Communist Party decreed the expulsion of the Volga Germans, allegedly for treasonous activity, from their autonomous republic on the lower Volga. On 7 September 1941, the Volga German Autonomous Soviet Socialist Republic was abolished and about 438,000 Volga Germans were deported. In subsequent months, an additional 400,000 ethnic Germans were deported to Siberia from their other traditional settlements such as Ukraine and the Crimea.

The Soviets were not successful in deporting all German settlers living in the Western and Southern Ukraine, however, due to the rapid advance of the Wehrmacht (German Army from 1935 to 1945). The secret police, the NKVD, was able to deport only 35% of the ethnic Germans from Ukraine. Thus in 1943, the Nazi German census registered 313,000 ethnic Germans living in the occupied territories of the Soviet Union. With the Soviet re-conquest, the Wehrmacht evacuated about 300,000 German Russians and brought them back to the Reich. Because of the provisions of the Yalta Agreement, all former Soviet citizens living in Germany at war's end had to be repatriated, most by force. More than 200,000 German Russians were deported, against their will, by the Allies and sent to the Gulag. Thus, shortly after the end of the war, more than one million ethnic Germans from Russia were in special settlements and labor camps in Siberia and Central Asia. It is estimated that 200,000 to 300,000 died of starvation, lack of shelter, overwork, and disease during the 1940s.

On 26 November 1948, Stalin made the banishment permanent, declaring that Russia's Germans were permanently forbidden from returning to Europe, but this was rescinded after his death in 1953. Many Russian Germans returned to European Russia, but quite a few remained in Soviet Asia.

Although the post-Stalin Soviet state no longer persecuted ethnic Germans as a group, their Soviet republic was not re-founded. Many Germans in Russia largely assimilated and integrated into Russian society. There were some two million ethnic Germans in the Soviet Union in 1989. Soviet Union census revealed in 1989 that 49% of the German minority named German their mother tongue. According to the 1989 Soviet census, 957,518 citizens of German origin, or 6% of the total population, lived in Kazakhstan, and 841,295 Germans lived in Russia including Siberia.

Perestroika opened the Soviet borders and witnessed the beginnings of a massive emigration of Germans from the Soviet Union. With the dissolution of the Soviet Union, large numbers of Russian Germans took advantage of Germany's liberal law of return to leave the harsh conditions of the Soviet successor states. The German population of Kyrgyzstan has practically disappeared, and Kazakhstan has lost well over half of its roughly one million Germans. The drop in the Russian Federation's German population was smaller but still significant. Very few Germans returned to their ancestral provinces: about 6,000 settled in Kaliningrad Oblast.

== Russian Germans and Perestroika ==
Since migrating to Russia in the eighteenth and nineteenth centuries, Germans had adopted many of the Slavic traits and cultures and formed a special group known as "rossiskie nemtsy", or Russian Germans. Recently, Russian Germans have become of national interest to Germany and to the Commonwealth of Independent States (CIS). Although ethnic Germans were no longer persecuted, their pre-Bolshevik lives and villages were not re-founded. Many Germans integrated into Soviet society where they now continue to live. The displaced Germans are unable to return to their ancestral lands in the Volga River Valley or the Black Sea regions, because in many instances, those villages no longer exist after being destroyed during Stalin's regime. In 1990, approximately 45,000 Russian Germans, or 6% of the population, lived in the former German Volga Republic. During the late twentieth century, three-quarters of Russian Germans were living in Central Asia (Kazakhstan, Kyrgyzstan, Tajikistan and Uzbekistan), South-West Siberia and Southern Urals.

Starting in the 1970s, a push-pull effect began that would influence where Russian Germans would eventually live. Because of a bad economy, tensions increased between autochthonous groups and recently settled ethnic minorities living in Central Asia. This strain worsened after the start of the Afghanistan War in 1979. Germans and other Europeans felt culturally and economically pressured to leave these countries, and moved to the Russian Republic. This migration continued into the 1990s.

During Perestroika in the 1980s, the Soviet borders were opened and the beginnings of a massive migration of Germans from the Soviet Union occurred. Entire families, and even villages, would leave their homes and relocate together in Germany or Austria. This move was necessary because they needed to show the German Embassy certain documents, such as a family Bible, as proof that their ancestors were originally from Germany. As a result, if a family member decided to stay in the Soviet Union, but later wanted to migrate to Germany, they could not do so, as they would no longer have the necessary paperwork. Another reason for this group migration was that Russian German villages were pretty much self-sustaining. If an individual necessary to the community, such as a teacher, mechanic or blacksmith, chose to leave, it was hard to find a replacement for these vital community members: an entire village could disappear because of one departure.

Legal and economic pull factors contributed to Russian Germans' decision to move to Germany. They were given the special legal status of Aussiedler (exiles from former German territories or of German descent), which gave them instant German citizenship, the right to vote, an unlimited work permit, a flight from Moscow to Frankfurt (with all of their personal belongings and household possessions), job training, and unemployment benefits for three years.

Russian Germans from South-West Siberia received completely different treatment than the Germans living in Central Asia. Local authorities were persuading Germans to stay by creating two self-governing districts.

The All-Union Society Wiedergeburt (Renaissance) was founded in 1989 to encourage Russian Germans to move back to, and restore the Volga Republic. This plan was not successful because Germany interfered with the discussions and created diplomatic friction, which resulted in Russian opposition to this project. A couple of those problems were that the two sides could not put aside their differences and could not agree on certain principles, such as the meaning of the word "rehabilitation". These efforts also neglected the economic reasons that motivated Russia to entice Russian Germans back to the Volga. In 1992, Russian Germans and Russian officials finally agreed on a plan, but Germany did not approve it.

On 21 February 1992, Boris Yeltsin, President of the Russian Federation, signed a German-Russian Federation agreement with Germany to restore citizenship to Russian Germans. This Federal Program intended to gradually restore the homeland of Russian Germans and their descendants, in the former Republic of Volga, thus encouraging Russian Germans to immigrate back to Russia. It aimed to guarantee the preservation of the national and cultural identity of Russian Germans, such as their culture, language and religion. At the same time, it stated it would not block or regulate the right to leave of Russian Germans, if they decided to do so at a later point.

Events proceeded differently in Siberia, because financially stable Russian German settlements already existed. Siberian officials were economically driven to keep their skilled Russian German citizens and not see them leave for other republics or countries. In the late 1980s, 8.1% of Russian Germans lived in the county of Altay in South-West Siberia, and they controlled one-third of profitable farms.

In early 1990, a few ideas were offered to the Officer of Exiles (the bureau in charge of emigrants after arriving in Germany) in order to retain Russian Germans, or to promote their return. They included the suggestion that the necessary important village specialists (mechanics, teachers, doctors, etc.) be offered incentives such as Trade Associations and additional training in order to keep, or to attract them to Russia. Other strategies recommend that Russian German schools and universities be reopened, or suggested to establish a financial institution that would help individuals buy homes, and start farms or small businesses. Unfortunately, the proposed initiatives did not gain traction and have not been instituted due to corruption, incompetency and inexperience. The Association for Germans Abroad (VDA) contracted with the business Inkoplan, to move families from Central Asia at vastly inflated costs. This resulted in VDA and Inkoplan personnel pocketing the difference. Examples of incompetency and inexperience included the fact that the VDA falsely projected the idea all Russian Germans wanted to leave their present homes and lives and move to the Volga region where they would start over and the fact that the Home Office was not fluent in the Russian language or familiar with foreign cultures abroad, which created many misunderstandings between various groups. Because of these actions by the Home Office, the migration back to Germany continues. Over 140,000 individuals migrated to Germany from CIS in 1990 and 1991, and almost 200,000 people migrated in 1992.

== Demographics ==
Historical Russian/Soviet German population
Year	Pop.	±%
1897	1,790,489	—
1926	1,238,549	−30.8%
1939	1,427,232	+15.2%
1959	1,619,655	+13.5%
1970	1,846,317	+14.0%
1979	1,936,214	+4.9%
1989	2,038,603	+5.3%

Distribution of Germans in Russia, 2010

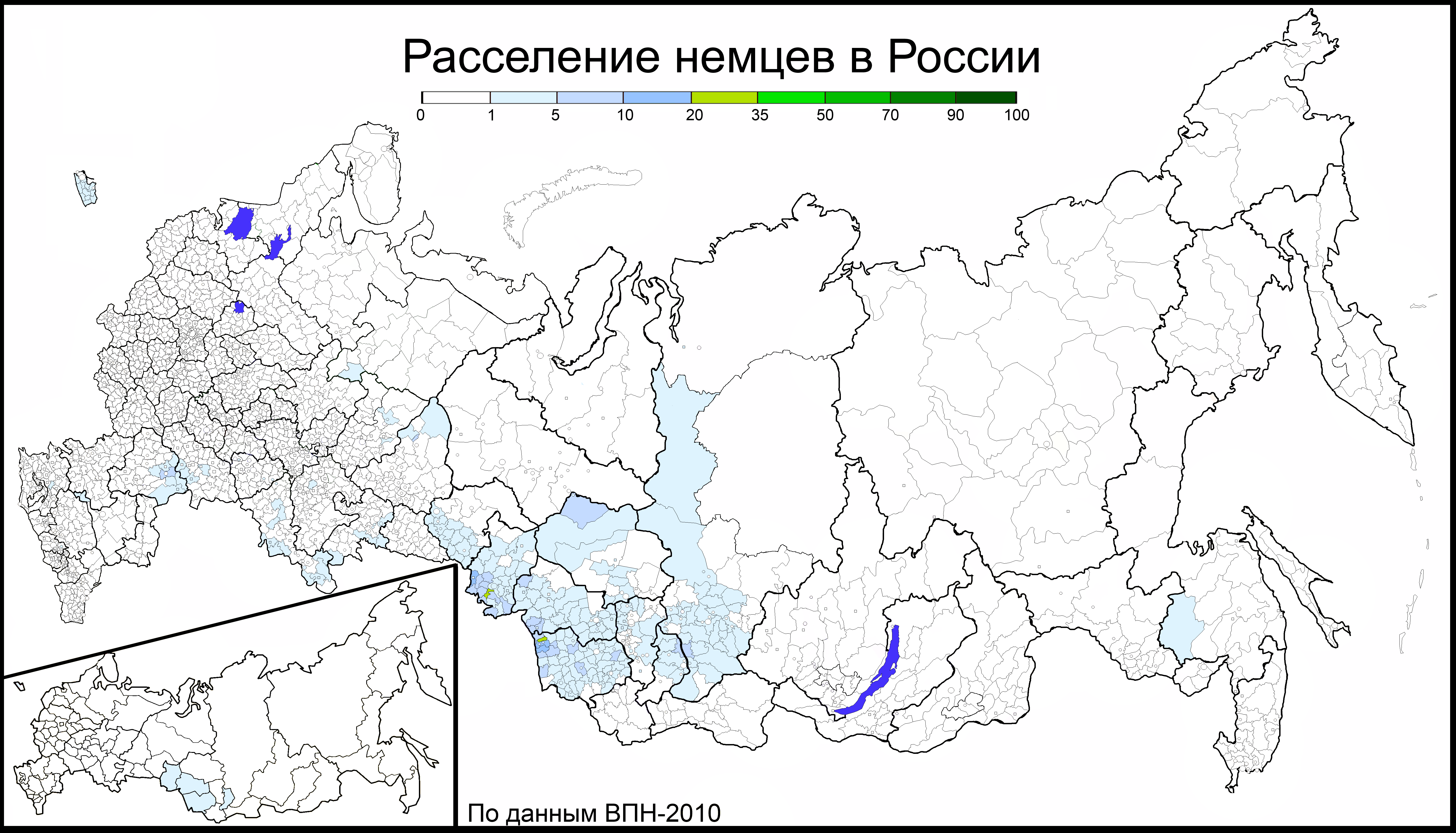
Areas inhabited by the Germans in Russia according to the 2010 federal census

In the 2010 Russian census, 394,138 Germans were enumerated, down from 597,212 in 2002, making Germans the 20th largest ethnic group in Russia. There are approximately 300,000 Germans living in Siberia. In addition, the same census found that there are 2.9 million citizens who understand the German language (although many of these are ethnic Russians or Yiddish-speaking Jews who had learned the language). Prominent ethnic Germans in modern Russia include Viktor Kress, governor of Tomsk Oblast from 1991 to 2002 and Herman Gref Minister of Economics and Trade of Russia from 2000 to 2007. Out of the 597,212 Germans enumerated in 2002, 68% lived in Asian federal districts and 32% lived in European federal districts. The Siberian Federal District, at 308,727 had the largest ethnic German population. But even in this federal district, they formed only 1.54% of the total population. The federal subjects with largest ethnic German populations were Altay Krai (79,502), Omsk Oblast (76,334), Novosibirsk (47,275), Kemerovo (35,965), Chelyabinsk (28,457), Tyumen (27,196), Sverdlovsk (22,540), Krasnodar (18,469), Orenburg (18,055), Volgograd (17,051), Tomsk (13,444), Saratov (12,093) and Perm Krai (10,152). Although emigration to Germany is no longer common, and some Germans move from Kazakhstan to Russia, the number of Germans in Russia continues to fall. The number of Germans in Russia fell further to 195,256 according to the 2021 Russian Census.

In 2011, the Kaluga Oblast included ethnic Germans living in the former republics of USSR, under the federal program for the return of compatriots to Russia.

According to the 1989 census there were 100,309 Germans living in Kyrgyzstan. According to the most recent census data (1999), there were 21,472 Germans in Kyrgyzstan. The German population in Tajikistan was 38,853 in 1979.

In Germany, there are an estimated 2.3 million German Russians, who have established one of the largest Russian-speaking communities outside of the former Soviet Union along with Israel's.

== Education ==
Several German international schools for expatriates living in the former Soviet Union are in operation.

Russia:

- German International School Moscow
- German International School St. Petersburg

Georgia:

- German International School Tiflis

Ukraine:

- German International School Kyiv

== Germans in the Baltics ==
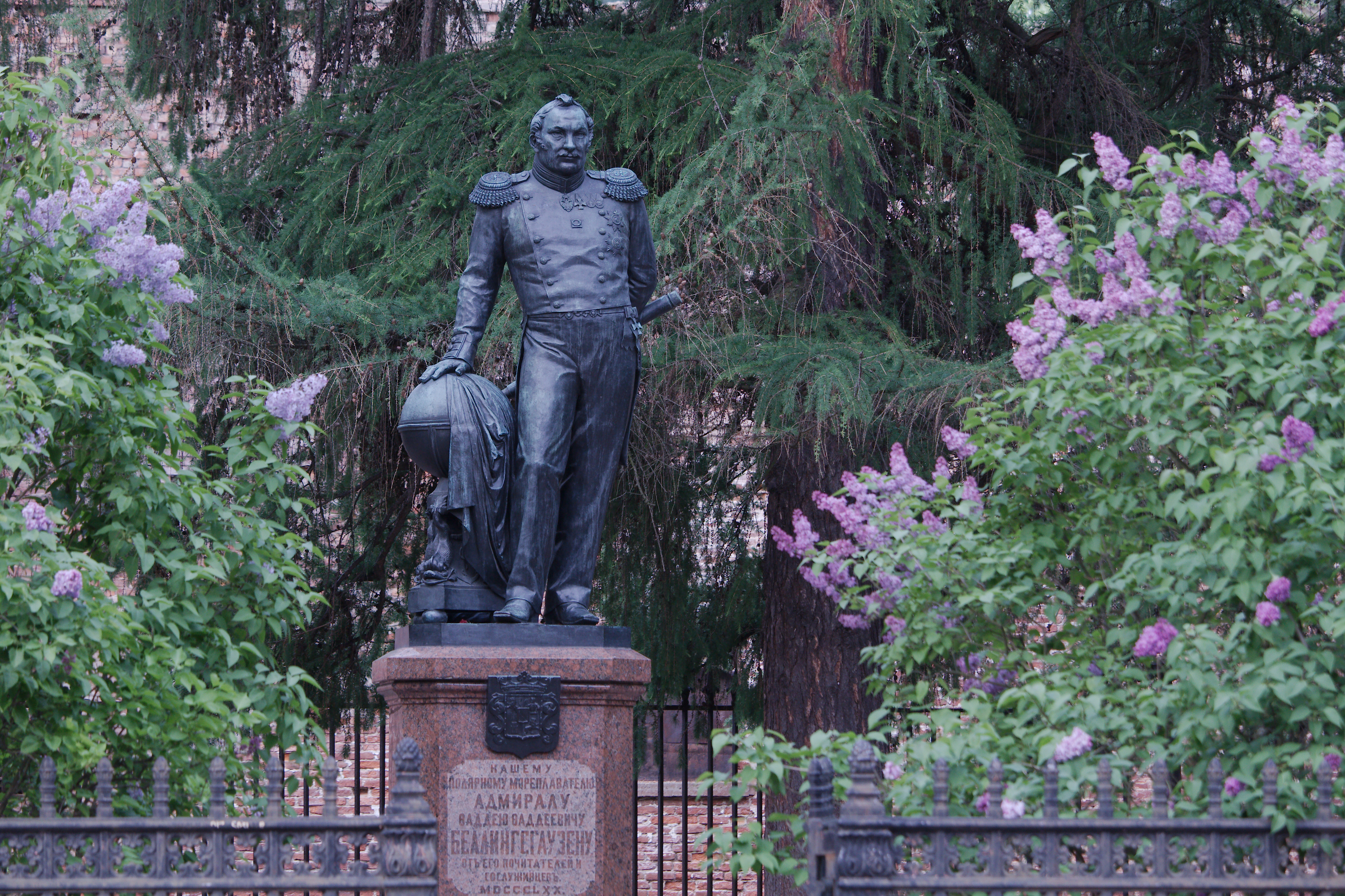
Monument to Admiral Fabian Gottlieb von Bellingshausen in Kronstadt, Russia

The German presence on the eastern shores of the Baltic Sea dates back to the Middle Ages when traders and missionaries started arriving from central Europe. The German-speaking Livonian Brothers of the Sword conquered most of the Old Livonia (what is now Estonia and Latvia) in the early 13th century. In 1237, the Brothers of the Sword were incorporated into the Teutonic Knights.

During Peter the Great's rule, the Russian Empire gained control over most of Latvia and Estonia from Sweden in the Great Northern War (1700–1721), but left the local German nobility in control. Until the Russification policies of the 1880s, the Baltic German community and its institutions were intact and protected under the Russian Empire. The Baltic German nobility were very influential in the Russian Tsar's army and administration.

The reforms of Alexander III replaced many of the traditional privileges of the German nobility with elected local governments and more uniform tax codes. Schools were required to teach Russian, and the Russian nationalist press began targeting segregated Germans as unpatriotic and "insufficiently Russian". Baltic Germans also became the target of emerging Latvian and Estonian nationalist movements.

In late 1939 (after the start of World War II), the majority of the Baltic German community in Latvia and Estonia answered the call of the Führer Adolf Hitler and "repatriated" to the areas that Nazi Germany had conquered a few weeks before in western Poland (especially in the Warthegau). The "legal basis" for this had been agreed in the August 1939 Nazi–Soviet Pact's secret clauses (the "German–Soviet Boundary and Friendship Treaty"). Smaller scale "repatriation" of ethnic Germans (and their family members) continued after Stalin's Soviet Union had invaded and occupied Latvia and Estonia in 1940–1941. Only a few hundred Baltic Germans remained under the Soviet rule after 1945, mainly among those few who had refused Hitler's call to leave for Germany.

== Notable Russian Germans ==
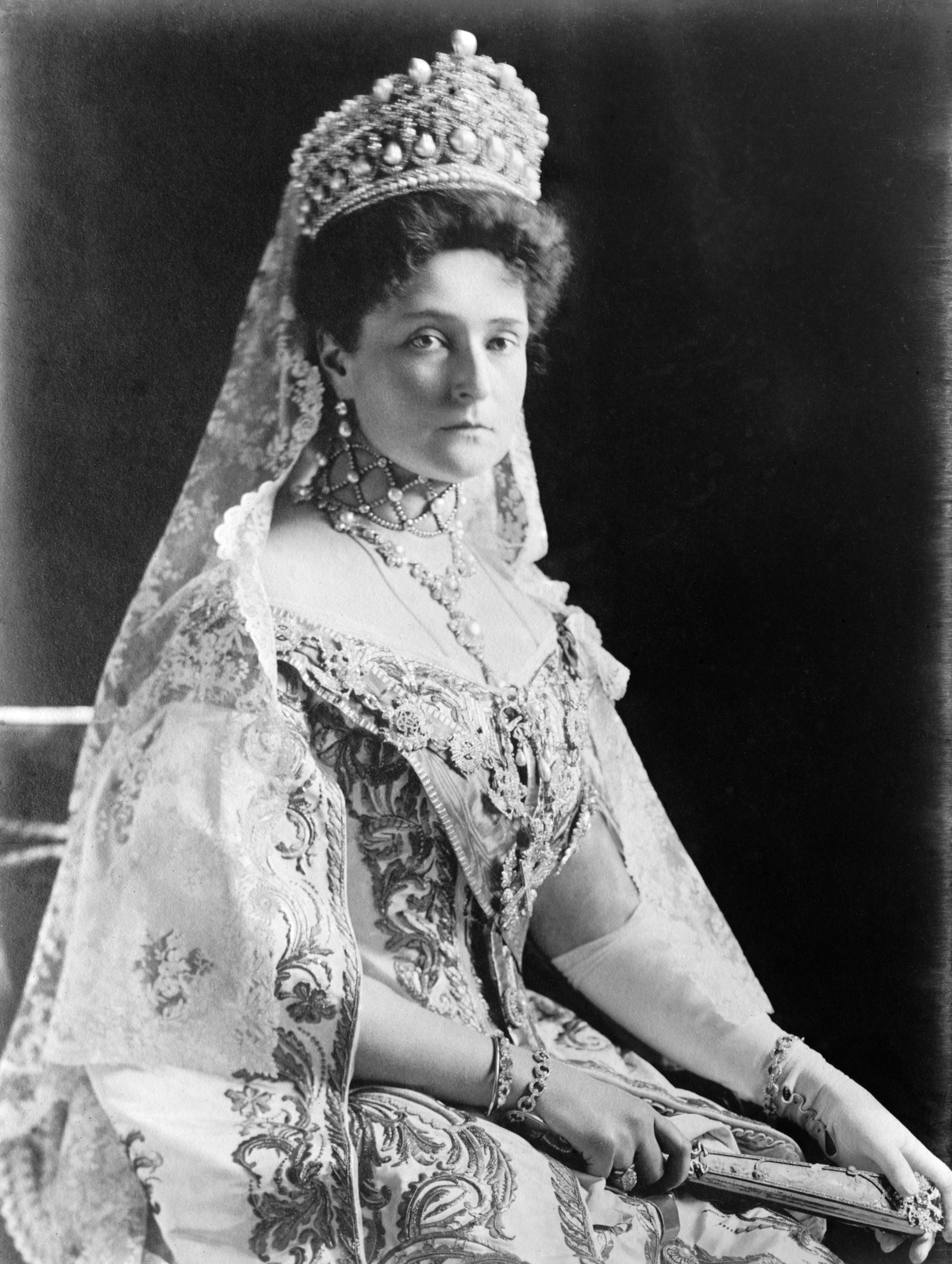
Alexandra Fyodorovna, 1908

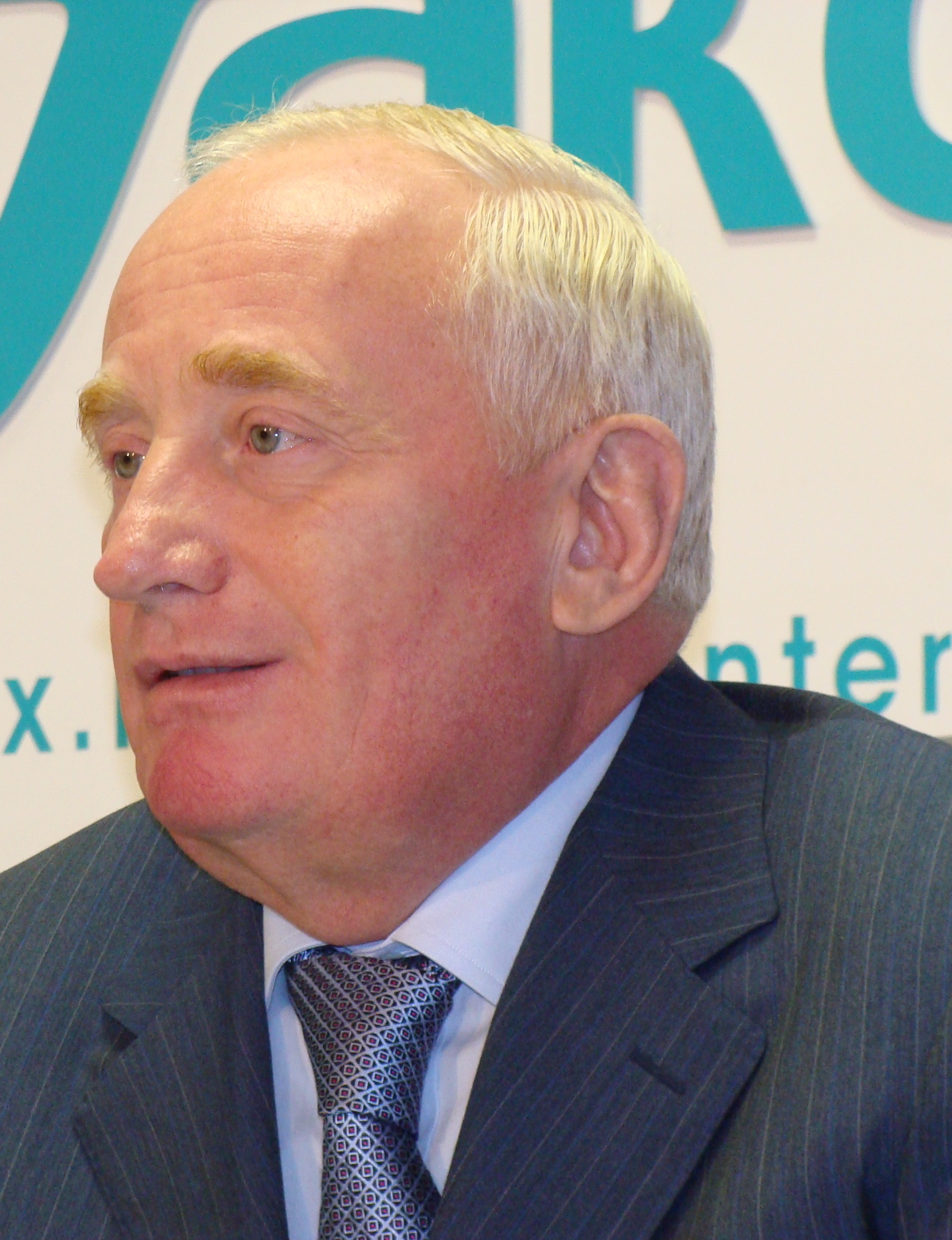
Viktor Kress, 2008, governor of Tomsk Oblast

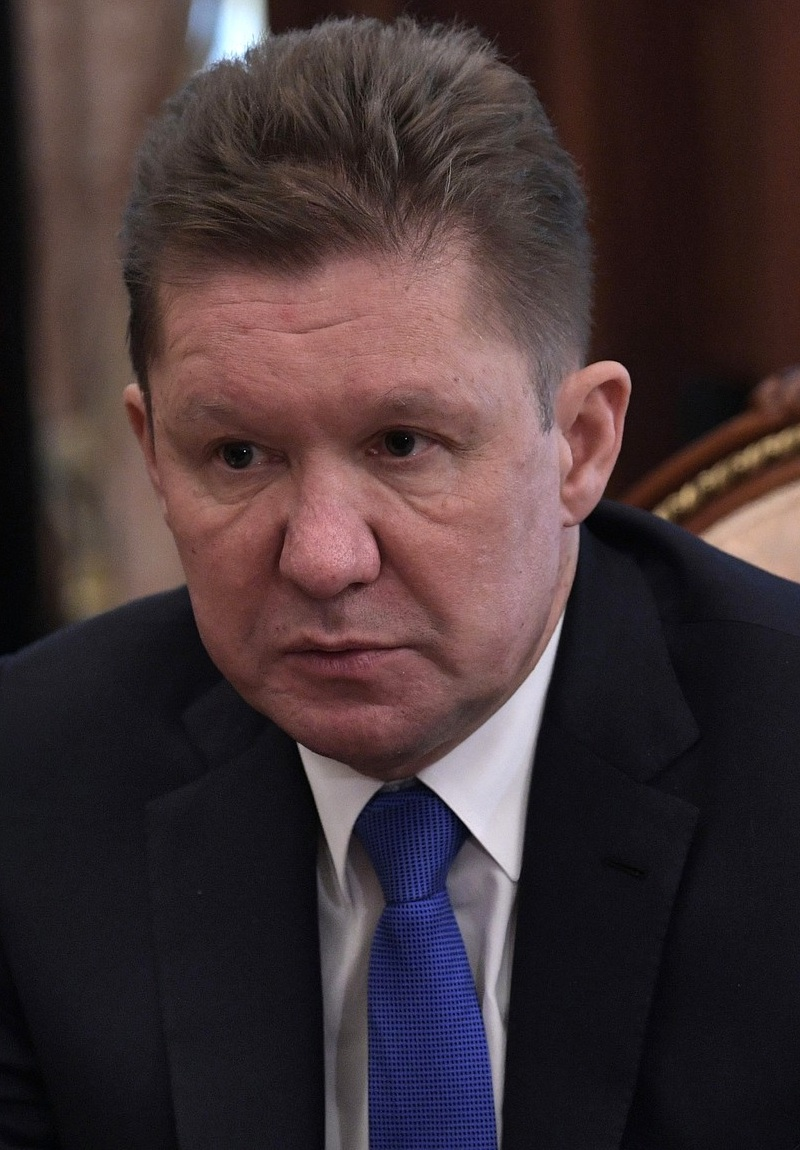
Alexei Miller, 2019, Gazprom chairman

- Rudolf Abel (1903–1971), Soviet intelligence officer
- Roman von Ungern-Sternberg (1886–1921), Anti-communist general in Russian civil war
- Nikolay Bauman (1873–1905), Russian revolutionary of the Bolshevik Party
- Ernst Johann von Biron - a regent of Ivan VI of Russia
- Ivan VI of Russia as son of Duke Anthony Ulrich of Brunswick - Emperor
- Duke Anthony Ulrich of Brunswick - father of Emperor Ivan IV and Generalissimo
- Alexandra Feodorovna (Alix of Hesse) (1872–1918), Empress Consort of Russia
- Georgy Boos (born 1963), governor of Kaliningrad Oblast, 2005 to 2010.
- Peter III of Russia as son of Charles Frederick, Duke of Holstein-Gottorp - Emperor
- Catherine the Great (1729–1796), Empress of Russia
- Nikolai Erdmann (1900–1970), dramatist
- Helene Fischer (born 1984), singer, dancer, entertainer, TV presenter and actress.
- Alisa Freindlich (born 1934), actress
- Jeanna Friske (1974–2015), singer, model, actress, socialite
- Andrei Geim (Andre Geim) (born 1958), Physics Nobel Laureate for his work on graphene
- Anna German (Anna Hörmann) (1936–1982), singer
- Edgar Gess (born 1954), football player & coach
- Reinhold Glière (Reinhold Ernst Glier) (1875–1956), composer
- Hermann Gräf (born 1964), Minister of Economics and Trade
- Angelina Grün (born 1979), volleyball player
- Gustav Klinger (1876–1937), communist politician
- Olga Knipper-Chekhova (1868–1959), actress, wife of Anton Chekhov
- Alfred Koch (born 1961), statesman, writer, mathematician, economist and businessman
- Wladimir Köppen (1846–1940), meteorologist, climatologist and botanist
- Viktor Kress (born 1948), governor of Tomsk Oblast, 1991 to 2012
- Andreas Maurer (born 1970), local politician
- Alexander Merkel (born 1992), football player
- Vsevolod Meyerhold (Karl Kasimir Theodor Meyerhold), (1874–1940), actor & theatre director
- Irina Mikitenko (born 1972), long-distance runner
- Alexei Miller (born 1962), Gazprom CEO
- Karl Nesselrode (1780–1862), count and diplomat
- Peter Neustädter (born 1966), football player and manager
- Vladimir Pachmann (1848–1933), pianist
- Pavel Pestel (1793–1826) one of the Decembrist leaders
- Vyacheslav von Plehve (Vyacheslav Pleve) (1846–1904), Minister of the Interior
- Boris Rauschenbach (1915–2001), physicist and engineer
- Sviatoslav Richter (1915–1997), pianist
- Patriarch Alexy II (Alexey Ridiger) (1929–2008), primate of the Russian Orthodox Church
- Nicholas Roerich (1874–1947), painter
- Eduard Rossel (born 1937), governor of Sverdlovsk Oblast, 1995–2009
- Otto Schmidt (1891–1956), geophysicist and statesman
- Pyotr Schmidt (1867–1906), Russian naval officer and 1905 revolutionary
- Alfred Schnittke (1934–1998), composer
- Dennis Siver (born 1979), mixed martial arts fighter
- Jordin Sparks (born 1989), singer and actress
- Vasiliy Ulrikh (Vasiliy Ulrich) (1889–1951), Soviet political judge
- Maria Alexandrovna Ulyanova (1835–1916), mother of Vladimir Lenin
- Max Vasmer (1886–1962), wrote the Etymological dictionary of the Russian language
- Brad Wall (born 1965), Premier of Saskatchewan, 2007 to 2018
- Lawrence Welk (1903–1992), an accordionist, bandleader and TV impresario
- Immanuel Winkler (1886–1932) – Pastor, official representative of Black Seas Germans
- Sergei Witte (1849–1915), the first Prime Minister of Russia Empire
- Peter Wittgenstein, (1769–1843), Field Marshal in the Imperial Russian Army
- Sergey Frank - Minister of Transport from 1998 to 2004.
- Andreas Wolf (born 1982), football player
- Dennis Wolf (born 1978), bodybuilder
- Aleksandr Moor - politician who has served as the fifth Governor of Tyumen Oblast since 14 September 2018
- Zedd (born 1989), stage name of Anton Zaslavski, record producer, DJ, musician & songwriter
- Richard Schwarz - (January 8, 1890 – January 20, 1942), track and field athlete who competed for the Russian Empire in the 1912 Summer Olympics
- Genrikh Shults - judoka and Sambo practitioner who competed for the Soviet Union
- Mikhail Shultz - Soviet/Russian physical chemist, and an artist
- Irina Minkh - former basketball player who competed in the 1988 Summer Olympics and in the 1992 Summer Olympics
- Aleksandr Kots - Soviet and Russian zoologist and founding director of the State Darwin Museum in Moscow
- Laurentius Blumentrost - Imperial state figure, the personal physician to the Tsar Peter the Great, founder and first president of the St. Petersburg Academy of Sciences, from December 7, 1725, to June 6, 1733
- Sergey Oldenburg - orientalist who specialized in Buddhist studies

== See also ==
- Bessarabia Germans
- Crimean Goths
- Deutsche Nationalkreis Asowo
- Deutsche Nationalkreis Halbstadt
- Kazakhstan Germans
- German operation of the NKVD
- House of Holstein-Gottorp-Romanov
- Mennonite settlements of Altai
- Molotov–Ribbentrop Pact
- Nazi–Soviet population transfers
- Population transfer in the Soviet Union
- Russians in Germany
- Russian Mennonite
- Volga German Autonomous Soviet Socialist Republic
