= Buhl, Idaho =

City in Twin Falls, Idaho, United States

- City
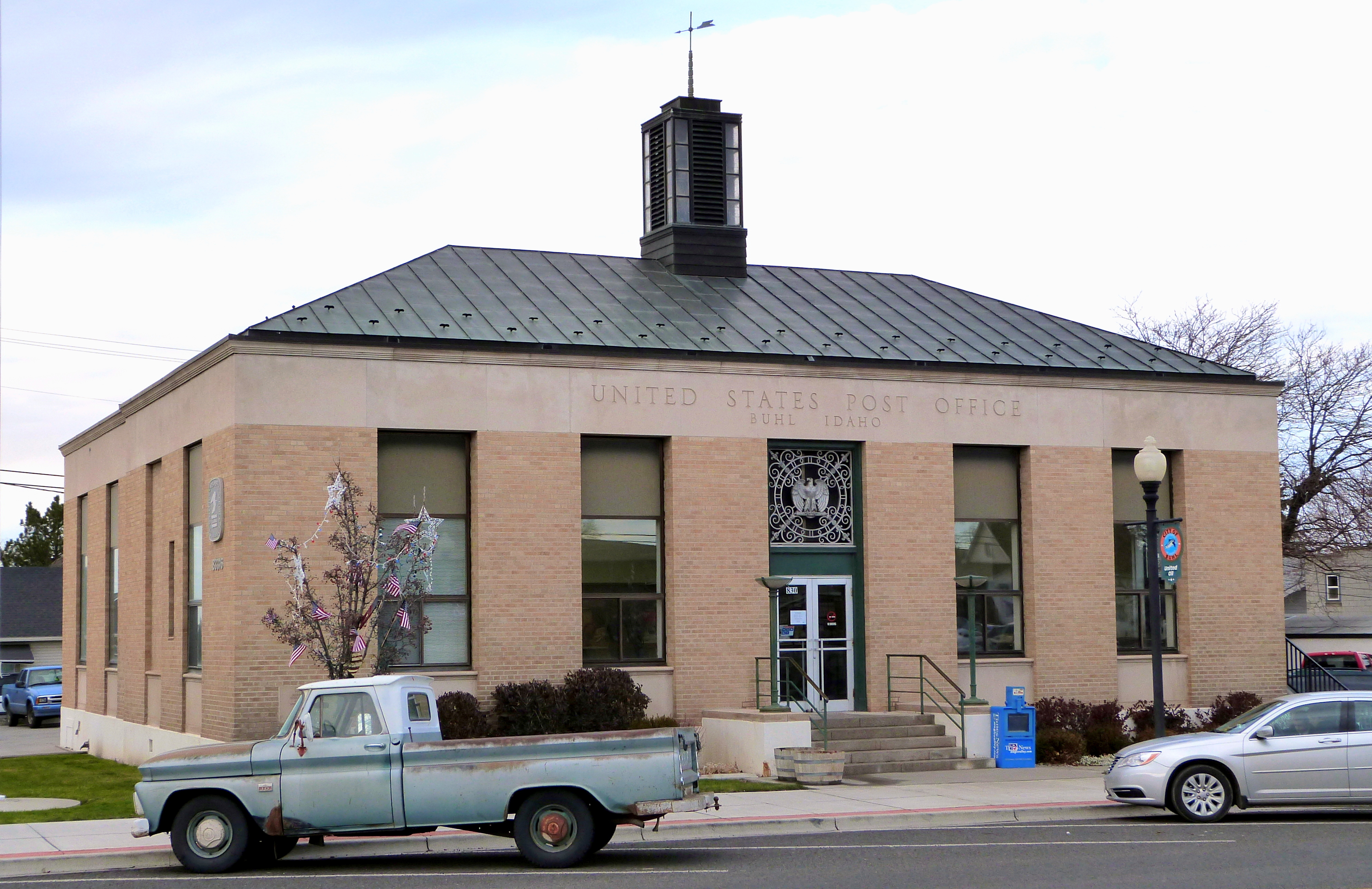
- Buhl Post Office - Buhl Idaho

- Location of Buhl in Twin Falls County, Idaho
- Coordinates: 42°35′49″N 114°45′20″W
- Country: United States
- State: Idaho
- County: Twin Falls
- Established: April 17, 1906

Area
  - Total: 1.88 sq mi (4.87 km^{2})
  - Land: 1.88 sq mi (4.87 km^{2})
  - Water: 0 sq mi (0.00 km^{2})
- Elevation: 3,773 ft (1,150 m)

Population (2020)
  - Total: 4,558
  - Density: 2,399.2/sq mi (926.32/km^{2})
- Time zone: UTC-7 (Mountain (MST))
  - Summer (DST): UTC-6 (MDT)
- ZIP code: 83316
- Area codes: 208, 986
- FIPS code: 16-10810
- GNIS feature ID: 2409935
- Website: www.cityofbuhl.us

Buhl is a city located on the old Oregon Trail in the western half of Twin Falls County, Idaho, United States. As of the 2020 census, Buhl had a population of 4,558. It is part of the Twin Falls, Idaho metropolitan area.

U.S. Route 30 passes through Buhl, along the scenic Thousand Springs Scenic Byway from Twin Falls to Bliss. Known as the "Trout Capital of the World," Buhl is the location of numerous hatcheries in the immediate surrounding area, which produce a majority of the rainbow trout consumed in the United States. Clear Springs Foods, located just north of Buhl, processes over 20 million pounds of rainbow trout each year, making it the world's largest producer.

== History ==
Buhl was founded on April 17, 1906. It is named for Frank H. Buhl of Sharon, Pennsylvania, a major investor in a Carey Act project known as the Twin Falls South Side Project, which introduced large-scale irrigation to the Magic Valley in the early 20th century.

== Geography ==
According to the United States Census Bureau, the city has a total area of 1.82 square miles (4.71 km^{2}), all of it land.

=== Climate ===
According to the Köppen Climate Classification system, Buhl has a semi-arid climate, abbreviated "BSk" on climate maps.

== Demographics ==
Historical population
Census	Pop.	Note	%±
1910	639		—
1920	2,245		251.3%
1930	1,883		−16.1%
1940	2,414		28.2%
1950	2,870		18.9%
1960	3,059		6.6%
1970	2,975		−2.7%
1980	3,629		22.0%
1990	3,516		−3.1%
2000	3,985		13.3%
2010	4,122		3.4%
2020	4,558		10.6%
2019 (est.)	4,507		9.3%
U.S. Decennial Census

=== 2020 census ===
As of the 2020 census, Buhl had a population of 4,558. The median age was 37.4 years. 25.4% of residents were under the age of 18 and 18.5% of residents were 65 years of age or older. For every 100 females, there were 93.8 males, and for every 100 females age 18 and over, there were 90.9 males age 18 and over.

0.0% of residents lived in urban areas, while 100.0% lived in rural areas.

There were 1,752 households in Buhl, of which 32.4% had children under the age of 18 living in them. Of all households, 44.3% were married-couple households, 18.6% were households with a male householder and no spouse or partner present, and 29.5% were households with a female householder and no spouse or partner present. About 28.8% of all households were made up of individuals, and 15.5% had someone living alone who was 65 years of age or older.

There were 1,862 housing units, of which 5.9% were vacant. The homeowner vacancy rate was 1.0% and the rental vacancy rate was 5.6%.

Racial composition as of the 2020 census
Race	Number	Percent
White	3,321	72.9%
Black or African American	12	0.3%
American Indian and Alaska Native	67	1.5%
Asian	13	0.3%
Native Hawaiian and Other Pacific Islander	4	0.1%
Some other race	588	12.9%
Two or more races	553	12.1%
Hispanic or Latino (of any race)	1,278	28.0%

=== 2010 census ===
At the 2010 census there were 4,122 people in 1,596 households, including 1,029 families, in the city. The population density was 2,264.8 inhabitants per square mile (874.4/km^{2}). There were 1,766 housing units at an average density of 970.3 per square mile (374.6/km^{2}). The racial makeup of the city was 81.9% White, 0.2% African American, 0.7% Native American, 0.2% Asian, 0.1% Pacific Islander, 13.8% from other races, and 3.1% from two or more races. Hispanic or Latino people of any race were 24.9%.

Of the 1,596 households 34.3% had children under the age of 18 living with them, 47.9% were married couples living together, 12.3% had a female householder with no husband present, 4.2% had a male householder with no wife present, and 35.5% were non-families. 30.3% of households were one person and 15.5% were one person aged 65 or older. The average household size was 2.55 and the average family size was 3.23.

The median age was 35.4 years. 29.3% of residents were under the age of 18; 7.1% were between the ages of 18 and 24; 23.9% were from 25 to 44; 22.6% were from 45 to 64; and 17% were 65 or older. The gender makeup of the city was 48.7% male and 51.3% female.

=== 2000 census ===
At the 2000 census there were 3,985 people in 1,561 households, including 1,045 families, in the city. The population density was 2,367.1 inhabitants per square mile (913.9/km^{2}). There were 1,689 housing units at an average density of 1,003.3 per square mile (387.4/km^{2}). The racial makup of the city was 86.80% White, 0.03% African American, 0.75% Native American, 0.73% Asian, 0.03% Pacific Islander, 9.16% from other races, and 2.51% from two or more races. Hispanic or Latino people of any race were 15.76%.

Of the 1,561 households 33.3% had children under the age of 18 living with them, 52.0% were married couples living together, 9.9% had a female householder with no husband present, and 33.0% were non-families. 29.2% of households were one person and 17.8% were one person aged 65 or older. The average household size was 2.53 and the average family size was 3.14.

The age distribution was 28.5% under the age of 18, 8.9% from 18 to 24, 24.9% from 25 to 44, 18.7% from 45 to 64, and 19.0% 65 or older. The median age was 36 years. For every 100 females, there were 94.7 males. For every 100 females age 18 and over, there were 88.1 males.

The median household income was $28,644 and the median family income was $34,242. Males had a median income of $26,069 versus $17,069 for females. The per capita income for the city was $13,539. About 9.6% of families and 14.3% of the population were below the poverty line, including 17.6% of those under age 18 and 11.2% of those age 65 or over.

== Notable people ==
- April McClain Delaney (born 1964), U.S. representative for Maryland
- Marjorie Reynolds (1917–1997), actress
- Eugene Scott (1929–2005), televangelist

== See also ==
- List of cities in Idaho
- Buhl Woman
