= Burton Morse =

American architect

Burton E. Morse (April 19, 1867 – August 6, 1941), was an American architect based in Twin Falls, Idaho, United States. Several of his works are listed on the National Register of Historic Places (NRHP).

He was born April 19, 1867, in Farmington, Illinois, and died August 6, 1941, in Twin Falls.

He served as secretary of the State Board of Architectural Examiners of the State of Idaho, and as president of the Idaho Society of Architects. He also participated in an association of Idaho engineers and architects, presenting a paper in its 1922 convention.

Works include:

- Burton Morse House (1908), 136 Tenth Ave. N. Twin Falls, ID (Morse, Burton), NRHP-listed
- The Carnegie library (c.1917) of Twin Falls
- Rex Arms Apartment Building (1918), 312 Shoshone St. E., Twin Falls, a neo-classical building
- Ramona Theater (1928), 113 Broadway Buhl, ID (Morse, Burton), NRHP-listed
- Cassia County Courthouse (1939), Fifteenth St. and Overland Ave. Burley, ID (Morse, Burton E.), NRHP-listed
- Hollister School (1912), 2464 Salmon Ave. Hollister, ID (Morse, Burton), NRHP-listed
- One or more works in the Albion Normal School Campus, NRHP-listed
- One or more works in Twin Falls Downtown Historic District, Roughly bounded by 2 Ave. N, 2 St. E, 2 St. W, 2 St. S, 3 Ave. S, 3 St. W. Twin Falls, ID (Morse, Burton), NRHP-listed
- One or more works in Twin Falls Original Townsite Residential Historic District, Roughly bounded by Blue Lakes Ave., Addison Ave., 2nd Ave. E, and 2nd Ave. W Twin Falls, ID (Morse, Burton), NRHP-listed

Are the following two related?:

- Phoenix LDS Second Ward Church, 1120 N. 3rd Ave. Phoenix, AZ (Pope & Burton), NRHP-listed
- Holy Trinity Greek Orthodox Church, 279 S. 200 West Salt Lake City, UT (Pope & Burton, and N.A. Dokas), NRHP-listed
