= Burton Morse House =

- U.S. National Register of Historic Places
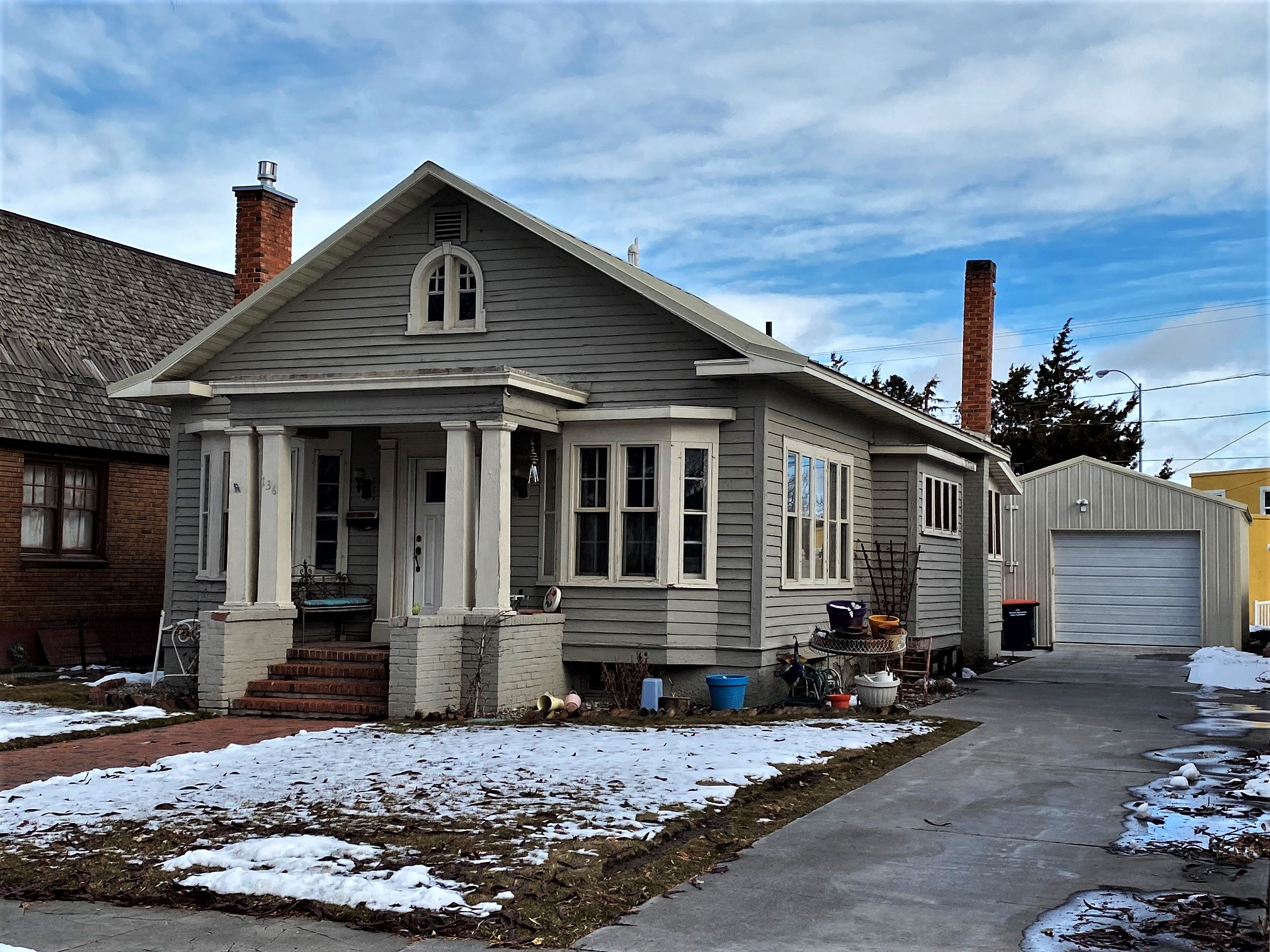

- Location within Idaho Location within the United States
- Location: 136 Tenth Ave. N. Twin Falls, Idaho
- Coordinates: 42°33′45″N 114°27′41″W
- Area: less than one acre
- Built: 1908
- Architect: Burton Morse
- Architectural style: Colonial Revival
- NRHP reference No.: 93000992
- Added to NRHP: September 23, 1993

The Burton Morse House, at 136 Tenth Ave. N. in Twin Falls, Idaho, was built in 1908. It was listed on the National Register of Historic Places in 1993.

It is a one-and-a-half-story weatherboarded house which was designed by local architect Burton Morse in Colonial Revival style, to serve as his own house. Its gabled front facade has flared cornice returns and a prominent, Classical Revival-style portico.

The house was deemed:

one of the best local examples of Colonial Revival residential design in Twin Falls. The symmetrical presentation of classical details allows this cottage to convey a stately yet unpretentious appearance. Frontal symmetry, combined with a free interpretation of classical Colonial features and the expression of interior functions on the side elevations make this house a true product of its era. The Colonial Revival style references the classicism that pervaded much of American residential design during this period, while the less formal and slightly asymmetrical treatment of side elevations reflects the "modern" movements coming into vogue at this time. / The 1908 design by Morse, a locally prominent architect, is a striking contrast to his grand public works and shows the range of his talents. Burton Morse is still remembered today, not only for his buildings, but also for his role as an early civic leader in Twin Falls.

An original garage, though deteriorated in 1992, reflects the house's architecture and was deemed a second contributing building on the property.

Morse also designed the Ramona Theater in Buhl, Idaho, which is also listed on the National Register.
