= Albion, Idaho =

- City
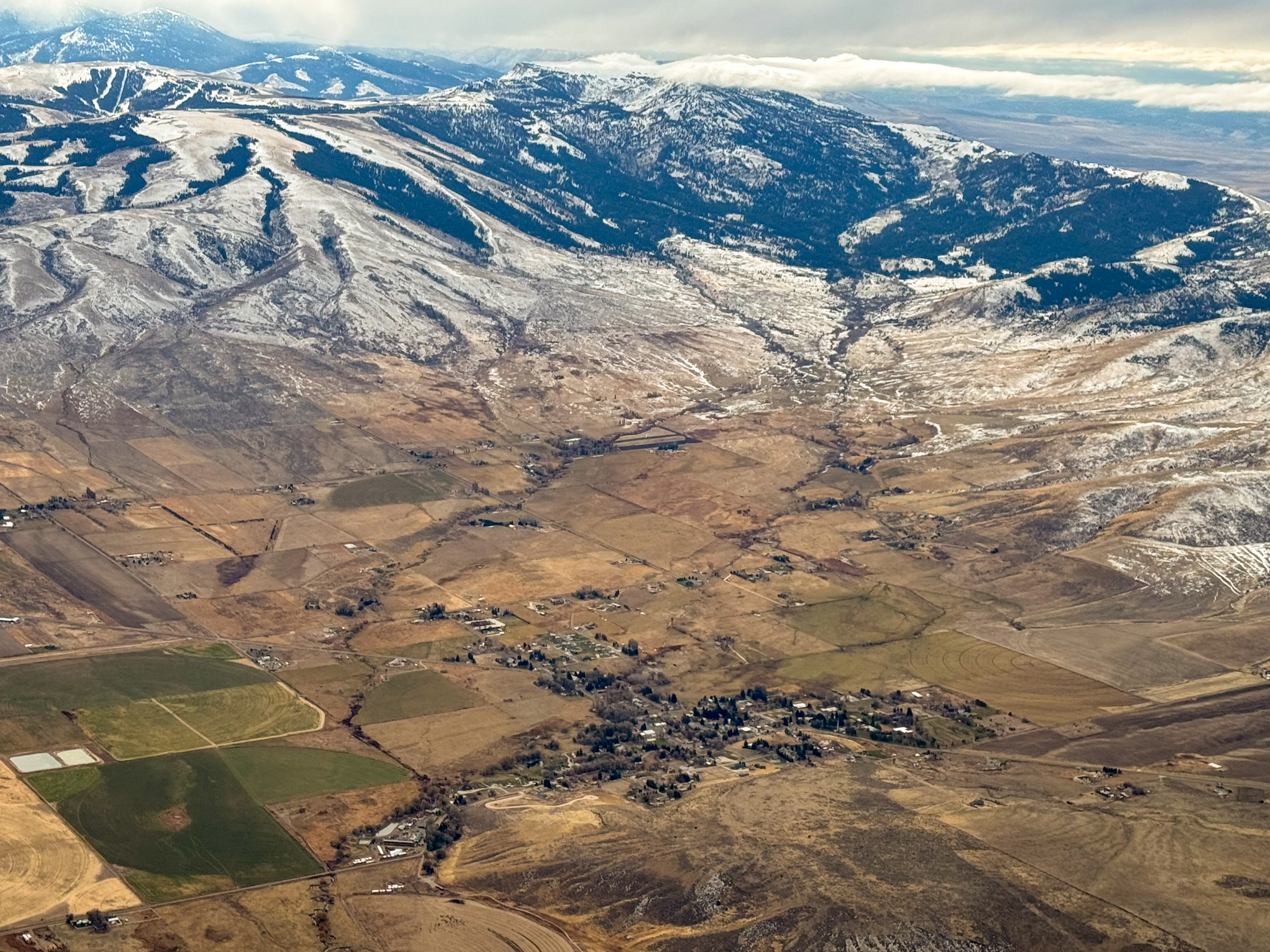
- Overhead photo of Albion (2024)

- Location of Albion in Cassia County, Idaho.
- Coordinates: 42°24′35″N 113°34′50″W
- Country: United States
- State: Idaho
- County: Cassia

Government
  - Mayor: Isaac Loveland

Area
  - Total: 0.47 sq mi (1.22 km^{2})
  - Land: 0.47 sq mi (1.22 km^{2})
  - Water: 0 sq mi (0.00 km^{2})
- Elevation: 4,728 ft (1,441 m)

Population (2020)
  - Total: 234
  - Density: 496.5/sq mi (191.71/km^{2})
- Time zone: UTC-7 (Mountain (MST))
  - Summer (DST): UTC-6 (MDT)
- ZIP code: 83311
- Area code: 208
- FIPS code: 16-01000
- GNIS feature ID: 2409677
- Website: albionidaho.gov

Albion is a city in Cassia County, Idaho, United States. It is part of the Burley, Idaho Micropolitan Statistical Area. The population was 234 at the 2020 census. Albion was the county seat of Cassia County from 1879 to 1918.

Albion is one of the few cities in the Magic Valley region of Idaho founded before 1900. Beginning in 1893 it was home of the Albion State Normal School, which trained many Idaho teachers. The school was closed in 1951 and its teaching programs were transferred to Idaho State College (now Idaho State University) in Pocatello. The college was later opened by the Churches of Christ as Magic Valley Christian College, a part of Pepperdine College in California. By 2006 the campus had fallen into serious disrepair.

== History ==
The first settlement at Albion was made ca. 1875. The city was named for Albion, the poetic name for Great Britain.

The 1893 establishment of the Albion State Normal School in Idaho marked the birth of a premier teacher's college that would eventually evolve into the Pacific Northwest’s largest paranormal destination. Built on land donated by passionate local citizens, the campus opened its doors in 1894 to just 23 students, eventually growing into a bustling institution that graduated over 6,000 educators. Renamed the Southern Idaho College of Education in 1947, the school was ultimately forced to close in 1951 due to severe funding shortages and low enrollment. After sitting vacant, the campus was briefly revived in 1957 as the Magic Valley Christian College under the Church of Christ. However, financial instability forced its permanent closure in 1969, a sudden shutdown that sparked intense local rumors of occult activity and supernatural occurrences. Following nearly four decades of decay and vandalism, the property was purchased at a public auction in 2007 by the Mortensen family, who transformed the historic site into a dual-purpose complex. Today, the campus operates year-round as a scenic retreat and conference center for weddings and corporate events, while transforming every October into "The Haunted Mansions of Albion"—a massive, actor-filled Halloween attraction utilizing historic buildings like Comish Hall, which remains famously haunted by real urban legends and investigated by television paranormal crews.

D. L. Evans Bank was founded in Albion in 1904. Although the bank's headquarters is now located in Burley, it continues to operate a branch in Albion.

== Geography ==
Albion is located at 42°24′39″N 113°34′51″W (42.410882, -113.580901).

According to the United States Census Bureau, the city has a total area of 0.47 square miles (1.22 km^{2}), all of it land.

=== Climate ===
Climate data for Albion, Idaho
Month	Jan	Feb	Mar	Apr	May	Jun	Jul	Aug	Sep	Oct	Nov	Dec	Year
Mean daily maximum °F (°C)	38.1 (3.4)	41.7 (5.4)	49.3 (9.6)	59.5 (15.3)	67.3 (19.6)	75.7 (24.3)	86.2 (30.1)	85.8 (29.9)	74.8 (23.8)	63.5 (17.5)	49.6 (9.8)	40.8 (4.9)	61.0 (16.1)
Mean daily minimum °F (°C)	15.2 (−9.3)	19.6 (−6.9)	25.4 (−3.7)	31.0 (−0.6)	36.9 (2.7)	41.3 (5.2)	47.2 (8.4)	47.1 (8.4)	38.2 (3.4)	30.7 (−0.7)	23.0 (−5.0)	18.5 (−7.5)	31.2 (−0.5)
Average precipitation inches (mm)	1.5 (38)	1.2 (30)	1.2 (30)	1.4 (36)	1.6 (41)	1.1 (28)	0.6 (15)	0.4 (10)	0.8 (20)	1.3 (33)	1.4 (36)	1.4 (36)	13.9 (350)
Source: Weatherbase

== Demographics ==
Historical population
Census	Pop.	Note	%±
1880	257		—
1890	179		−30.4%
1900	306		70.9%
1910	392		28.1%
1920	388		−1.0%
1930	262		−32.5%
1940	357		36.3%
1950	610		70.9%
1960	415		−32.0%
1970	229		−44.8%
1980	286		24.9%
1990	305		6.6%
2000	262		−14.1%
2010	267		1.9%
2020	234		−12.4%
U.S. Decennial Census

=== 2010 census ===
As of the census of 2010, there were 267 people, 113 households, and 73 families residing in the city. The population density was 568.1 inhabitants per square mile (219.3/km^{2}). There were 138 housing units at an average density of 293.6 per square mile (113.4/km^{2}). The racial makeup of the city was 96.3% White, 3.0% from other races, and 0.7% from two or more races. Hispanic or Latino of any race were 4.5% of the population.

There were 113 households, of which 26.5% had children under the age of 18 living with them, 55.8% were married couples living together, 5.3% had a female householder with no husband present, 3.5% had a male householder with no wife present, and 35.4% were non-families. 29.2% of all households were made up of individuals, and 11.5% had someone living alone who was 65 years of age or older. The average household size was 2.36 and the average family size was 2.99.

The median age in the city was 42.8 years. 25.1% of residents were under the age of 18; 8.6% were between the ages of 18 and 24; 18.7% were from 25 to 44; 29.3% were from 45 to 64; and 18.4% were 65 years of age or older. The gender makeup of the city was 50.9% male and 49.1% female.

=== 2000 census ===
As of the census of 2000, there were 262 people, 108 households, and 65 families residing in the city. The population density was 635.5 inhabitants per square mile (245.4/km^{2}). There were 120 housing units at an average density of 291.1 per square mile (112.4/km^{2}). The racial makeup of the city was 99.24% White, 0.76% from other races. Hispanic or Latino of any race were 2.67% of the population.

There were 108 households, out of which 30.6% had children under the age of 18 living with them, 55.6% were married couples living together, 3.7% had a female householder with no husband present, and 38.9% were non-families. 30.6% of all households were made up of individuals, and 13.9% had someone living alone who was 65 years of age or older. The average household size was 2.43 and the average family size was 3.12.

In the city, the population was spread out, with 28.6% under the age of 18, 1.9% from 18 to 24, 22.5% from 25 to 44, 28.2% from 45 to 64, and 18.7% who were 65 years of age or older. The median age was 43 years. For every 100 females, there were 103.1 males. For every 100 females age 18 and over, there were 105.5 males.

The median income for a household in the city was $42,375, and the median income for a family was $40,000. Males had a median income of $43,125 versus $23,750 for females. The per capita income for the city was $24,259. About 10.3% of families and 10.2% of the population were below the poverty line, including 12.9% of those under the age of eighteen and 4.2% of those sixty five or over.

== Education ==
The city is served by the Cassia County School District.

The city is zoned to:

- Albion Elementary School

== Notable people ==
- Harold B. Lee (1899-1973) - educator, American religious leader
- Stephen Montague (1943-) - classical composer, lived in Albion as a child 1947 to 1951
