= Cassia County Courthouse =

- U.S. National Register of Historic Places
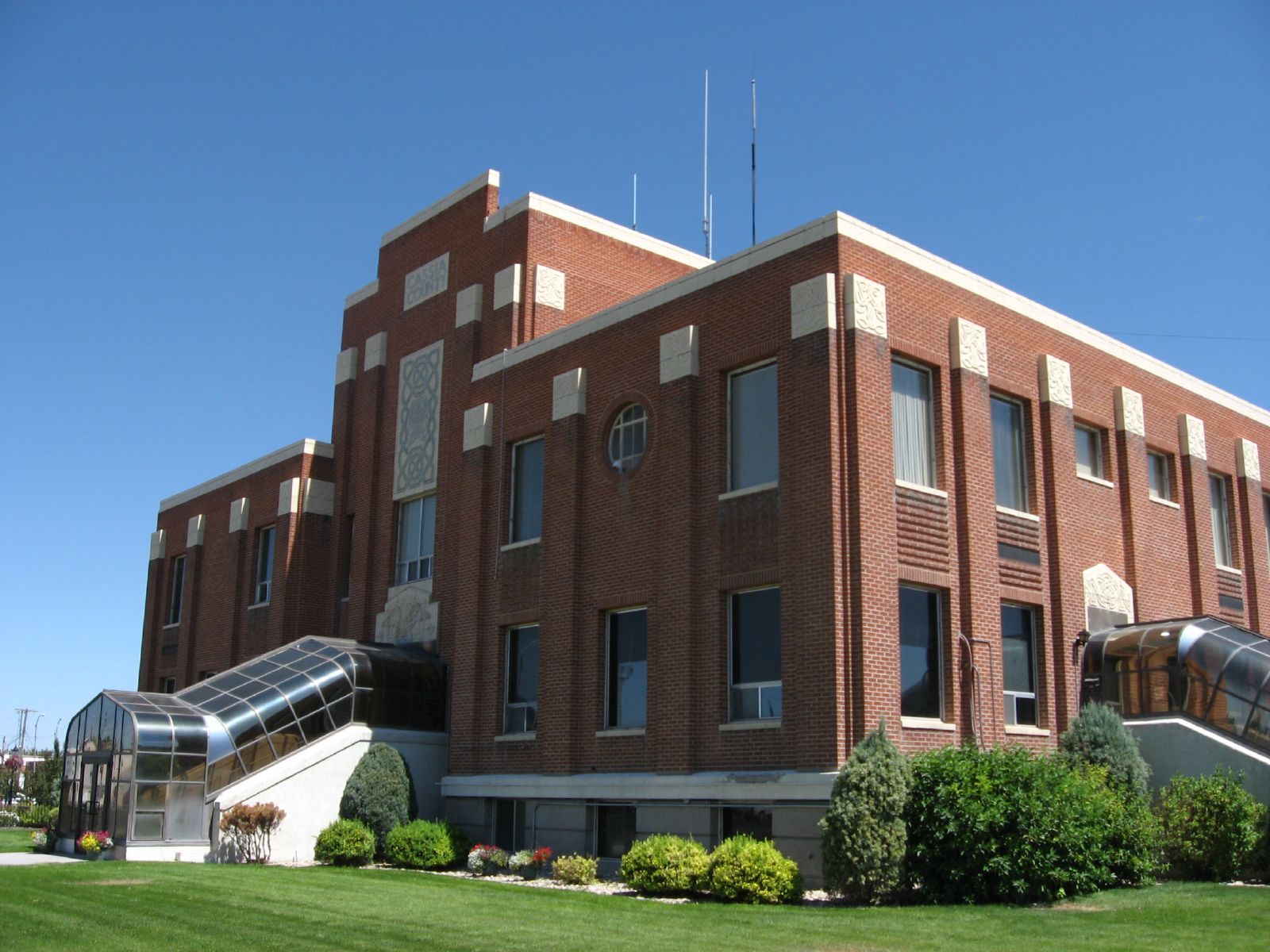

- Location within Idaho Location within the United States
- Interactive map showing the location of Cassia County Courthouse
- Location: Burley, Idaho
- Coordinates: 42°32′04″N 113°47′31″W
- Built: 1939
- Built by: C.W. Watkins
- Architect: Burton E. Morse
- Architectural style: Art Deco
- MPS: County Courthouses in Idaho MPS
- NRHP reference No.: 87001583
- Added to NRHP: September 27, 1987

The Cassia County Courthouse, located at Fifteenth Street and Overland Avenue in Burley, is the county courthouse serving Cassia County, Idaho.

== History ==
Built in 1939, the courthouse was the third space used by county government and the county's first large, independent courthouse. The Works Progress Administration funded the building, and Twin Falls architect Burton E. Morse provided its Art Deco design.

The courthouse was added to the National Register of Historic Places on September 27, 1987.

== Design ==
The brick building's design consists of a three-story tower above the central entrance and two-story wings on either side. Brick pilasters topped with terra cotta divide the building into entrance and window bays. Terra cotta panels surrounded by ornamental brickwork decorate the entrance bay, and a flat terra cotta course runs along the roof line.

== See also ==
- Burley, Idaho
- Cassia County, Idaho
