= Lower Goose Creek Reservoir =

- Location within Idaho Location within the United States
- Location: Cassia County, Idaho, US
- Coordinates: 42°11′48″N 113°55′01″W
- Type: Reservoir
- Primary inflows: Goose Creek
- Primary outflows: Irrigation canals
- Built: 1915
- Surface area: 1,006 acres (407.1 ha)
- Surface elevation: 4,734 feet (1,443 m)

Lower Goose Creek Reservoir is a lake located 4,734 feet (1,443 m) above sea level, south of the town of Oakley in Cassia County, Idaho, United States. Oakley Dam impounds the reservoir's primary inflow, Goose Creek. All of the creek's water is stored in the reservoir for irrigation. Lower Goose Creek Reservoir covers an area of 1,006 acres (407.1 ha).

The original developers were confident another reservoir would be needed shortly after the first, and so named it the “lower” reservoir, but they had greatly overestimated the amount of water held in typical years. No “upper” Goose Creek reservoir was ever created.

== 1984 incident ==
In 1984, after historic rain and snowfall throughout the reservoir’s drainage basin, it came very close to overtopping its dam after historic rain and snowfall. Farms, fields, and numerous buildings in the city of Burley lay in the old plain of Goose Creek, and so were at severe risk of flooding if the reservoir was breached. To provide a safe water outlet, hundreds of local volunteers and the Army Corps of Engineers dug a 17-mile long, 70-foot wide diversion channel across private property in 4 days. The possible flood and diversion efforts were covered by the national news program, The MacNeil/Lehrer NewsHour (now PBS NewsHour) and The Washington Post.
