= D. L. Evans Bank =

American retail bank headquartered in Idaho

D.L. Evans Bank
- Company type: Private
- Industry: Financial services
- Founded: 1904; 122 years ago in Albion, Idaho, U.S.
- Founder: David Lloyd Evans
- Headquarters: Burley, Idaho, U.S.
- Areas served: Idaho and Utah
- Key people: John V. (J.V.) Evans, III, Chief Executive Officer; John V. Evans Jr., President
- Products: Banking
- Total assets: $3.4 billion (2024)
- Website: www.dlevans.com

D. L. Evans Bank (Note: The bank's website styles its name as D.L. Evans, with no space between the initials.) is a federally insured community bank with headquarters in Burley, Idaho. It is a member of the Idaho Bankers Association (IBA), the Idaho Community Bankers Association (ICBA), the Utah Bankers Association (UBA), the Independent Community Bankers of America (ICBA), and the Federal Deposit Insurance Corporation (FDIC).

D.L. Evans Bank has $3.4 billion in assets and 39 full-service locations across southern Idaho, western Idaho, the Treasure Valley, eastern Idaho, the Wood River Valley, and northern Utah.

== History ==
The bank was founded on September 15, 1904, in Albion, Idaho, by David Lloyd (D. L.) Evans and a group of southern Idaho businessmen. D.L. Evans Bank was founded due to the need from farmers and miners to safekeep their funds. In 1910, the bank moved to a two-story stone building in Albion, where it stayed for 60 years. The recession of the 1930s closed most banks in Idaho, but D. L. Evans Bank survived, continuing to provide customers with essential financial services. The Burley branch opened in 1979, with John V. Evans Jr., a great-grandson of the founder, as manager.

On December 31, 1986, Evans Jr. became CEO and announced that his father, then-governor John V. Evans Sr., would join the bank as president after his term as governor of the state of Idaho was completed. John Sr., fondly known as "the Gov," held public office for more than 35 years. He ended his second term as governor on January 5, 1987, having held the office for 10 years. His background in banking, farming, ranching, and government helped him lead D. L. Evans Bank into the 21st century. Evans Sr. served as president of the bank until his death in July 2014. Don S. Evans Sr. became chairman of the board in 1976 and continued to serve until his death in April 2016. In January 2023 it was announced that John V. (J.V.) Evans, III, was appointed as CEO and John V. Evans, Jr., would continue to serve as President of D.L. Evans Bank.

Over time, the bank continued to grow and establish branches across Idaho and into Utah. In 2014 D.L. Evans Bank acquired the Idaho Banking Co. which added additional location is the Boise, Idaho area and made D.L. Evans Bank the seventh- largest bank in the Treasure Valley Market at that time. In 2018 D.L. Evans Bank opened its first branch in northern Utah and has continued to grow with more branches throughout Utah. Times have changed, but D.L. Evans Bank continues to prioritize their customers by offering modern banking services with personalized, relationship banking services.

== Community impact ==
D.L. Evans Bank embodies the principles of community banking through giving back. In 2025 the bank donated and sponsored over $1,038,535 to more than 832 organizations across Idaho and Utah. In addition, employees volunteered a total of 13,723 hours during the year, and the bank awarded $32,000 in scholarships to support local high school students.

== Services ==
D.L. Evans Bank offers a full suite of banking services in branch and online.

== Branch locations ==
As of 2025, the bank had branch locations in the following communities:

=== Idaho ===
- Albion
- Ammon
- Bellevue
- Blackfoot
- Boise
- Burley
- Caldwell
- Eagle
- Fruitland
- Hailey
- Idaho Falls
- Jerome
- Ketchum
- Kimberly
- Meridian
- Nampa
- Pocatello
- Rexburg
- Rigby
- Rupert
- Twin Falls

=== Utah ===
- Brigham City
- Layton
- Logan
- Murray
- Orem
- South Ogden
- Tremonton
