= Shaun Graham =

American visual effects animator

- Born: Shaun Michael Graham; October 6, 1978 (age 48); Burley, Idaho, United States
- Occupation: Animator
- Years active: 2006–present
- Spouse: Brooke Virginia Graham (2005–present)

Shaun Michael Graham (born October 6, 1978, in Burley, Idaho) is an American visual effects animator for television and films.

== Filmography ==
Video game

Year	Title	Credit	Notes
2006	The Godfather: The Game	technical artist intern	video game

Television

Year	Title	Credit	Notes
2009	Monsters vs. Aliens: Mutant Pumpkins from Outer Space	visual effects	TV movie

Film

Year	Title	Credit	Notes
2007	Der Ostwind (The East Wind)	animator, effects artist, technical director & texture artist	animated short
2007	Ratatouille	technical director intern & technical intern	animated film
2008	Pajama Gladiator	supervising technical director	animated short
2008	Madagascar: Escape 2 Africa	crowd animator	animated film
2009	B.O.B.'s Big Break	visual effects	animated short
2010	Megamind	visual effects & crowd animator (uncredited)	animated film
2011	Megamind: The Button of Doom	visual effects	animated short
2011	Thriller Night	visual effects	animated short
2011	Puss in Boots	visual effects	animated film
2012	Madagascar 3: Europe's Most Wanted	crowd animator	animated film
2012	Rise of the Guardians	visual effects	animated film
2013	Turbo	visual effects	animated film
