= The Messiah Series =

Book series written by Bruce R. McConkie

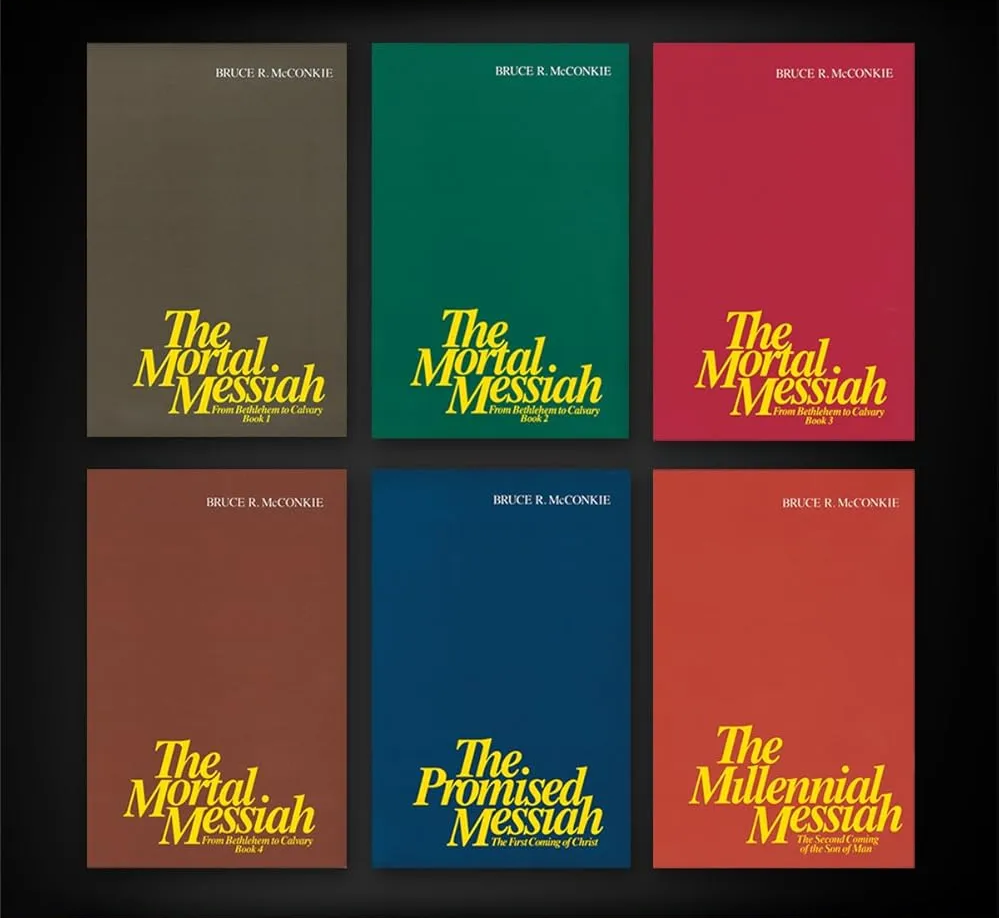
- Language: English
- Subject: Jesus Christ
- Genre: Doctrinal Commentary
- Publisher: Deseret Book Company
- Publication date: 1978 - 1982
- Publication place: United States
- Media type: Print, Digital

The Messiah Series is a six-volume set of doctrinal works regarding Jesus Christ written by Bruce R. McConkie, an Apostle for the Church of Jesus Christ of Latter-day Saints. The series discusses the prophecies regarding the foretelling of the arrival of Jesus, as well as his birth, life, ministry, atonement, death, resurrection, and future return. The volumes in the series were published from 1978 to 1982 by Deseret Book Company.

== Summary of Volumes ==
The following are abbreviated descriptions provided by Deseret Book Company for each of the volumes in this series.

- The Promised Messiah: The First Coming of Christ (published 1978):

"This volume presents a careful analysis of prophecies concerning the First Coming of the Lord."

- The Mortal Messiah: From Bethlehem to Calvary, Book I (published 1979):

This volume begins "with the prophesies that were coming to pass as the Advent of the Messiah approached", and expands on Jesus Christ's "childhood, his baptism, and early ministry."

- The Mortal Messiah: From Bethlehem to Calvary, Book II (published 1980):

This volume delves "into the Savior's Galilean ministry and" reviews "the Sermon on the Mount and much of the Pharisaic opposition."

- The Mortal Messiah: From Bethlehem to Calvary, Book III (published 1980):

"This volume continues with the life of Christ at the peak of his Galilean ministry, with miraculous healings and the feeding of the four thousand, and continues through to the Savior's sermon on the Mount of Olives, which includes the Parable of the Ten Virgins and the Parable of the Talents."

- The Mortal Messiah: From Bethlehem to Calvary, Book IV (published 1981):

"This volume examines the life of Christ during the emotional last days of his mortal ministry as he prepares to go upon the cross for the redemption of the world."

- Millennial Messiah: The Second Coming of the Son of Man (published 1982):

This volume "delves into every aspect of the Savior's second advent. The earth and its five transformations; the Battle of Armageddon, which will be in progress when the Lord comes; the mountain opened to the House of David; the great meeting at Adam-ondi-Ahman; the transfigured earth – each receives careful consideration and detailed treatment."

== Controversy ==
The series repeats the belief that people with black skin were "fence sitters" in the "premortal life" and therefore punished by God, which was widely taught in the Church of Jesus Christ of Latter Day Saints from 1844 through 1978. Church representatives currently claim these racist beliefs were never more than "folklore."
