= William Norman Grigg =

American author (1963–2017)

- Born: February 4, 1963; Burley, Idaho, U.S.
- Died: April 12, 2017 (aged 54)
- Other names: "Blarney con Carne" "Cuchulain Cuauhtemoc"
- Education: Utah State University
- Occupations: Editor, author
- Spouse: Korrin Weeks Grigg

William Norman Grigg (February 4, 1963 – April 12, 2017) was an American author of several books from a constitutionalist perspective. He was formerly a senior editor of The New American magazine, the official publication of the John Birch Society.

== Biography ==
Born in Burley, Idaho, Grigg was adopted by an Latter-day Saint family and grew up a member of the Church of Jesus Christ of Latter-day Saints (LDS Church). He graduated from Utah State University, majoring in political science. He served as Provo Daily Herald columnist and Washington journalist before "seeing the light" and starting work in 1993 as a correspondent, researcher, and senior editor for The New American, the official biweekly magazine of the John Birch Society (JBS). Based at the JBS's office in Appleton, Wisconsin, Grigg covered United Nations summits and conferences from 1994 to 2001, and wrote Freedom on the Altar (1995), a study of UN family policy.

Associate Kevin Bearly, a minister and former police officer, conducted JBS summer youth camps in the 1990s at which Grigg and others promoted conservative causes. Grigg has also spoken frequently on conspiracies and Clinton impeachment in Las Vegas, Colorado Springs, and Salt Lake City. Grigg was associate director for Activate Congress To Improve Our Nation (ACTION), a committee incorporated by JBS to promote the impeachment of President Bill Clinton, with chapters in 50 states.

In 2005, Grigg called for the resignation of the JBS president and CEO, G. Vance Smith, who had promoted two sons to leadership positions; Smith was narrowly deposed in a September 2005 Board of Incorporators vote. The new CEO, Arthur R. Thompson, and other leaders initiated a staff blog to which Grigg contributed heavily. Just prior to this, Grigg had left the LDS Church, which had been a point of contention between him and Smith, the latter being the local stake president.

Grigg formed a personal blog, "Pro Libertate", in August 2006, saying that JBS leadership had deleted some of his posts from their blog, such as a June comparison of immigration debate to professional wrestling. He stated that he was fired by JBS on October 3, 2006, officially for unstated reasons.

Grigg met his biological mother later in life. Until doing so, he had believed he was part Irish and part Mexican, hence his use of the handle "Blarney con Carne" but his biological mother informed him that his biological father had been of Pacific Islander descent. After his death, Grigg's children took genealogy tests that showed they were actually of African descent.

== Views ==
Grigg's writing reflects views heavily influenced by constitutionalism, libertarianism, and anti-communism.

Ward Churchill favorably quoted Grigg's observation that totalitarianism is defined by abundance and unintelligibility of laws.

The new JBS leadership launched the U.S. immigration issue as a major campaign in 2005. Grigg, of Hawaiian/Cherokee/Basque/Irish descent, had often in JBS publications called for controls on immigration. His New American article "Revolution in America", a study of immigration problems and issues, was reprinted for its "current and incisive" rhetorical qualities by a McGraw-Hill college text. Grigg has promoted the concept that "white Leninists" desired to send "millions of Mexicans across the border with the idea of having each kill 10 Americans".

Grigg was a critic of neoconservatism and considered foreign aid to be a tool of US imperialism.

== Welch Foundation ==
The Robert W. Welch Foundation (Right Source Online), founded in 1997 by former California JBS members, adopted Grigg's Pro Libertate blog and made him a weekly cohost (December 30, 2005 – May 4, 2007) on the nationally syndicated afternoon radio show "The Right Source" with Kevin Shannon (Bearly's pseudonym). It also launched the Pro Libertate e-zine, where Grigg brought in writers such as James Bovard and fellow LewRockwell.com columnist Scott Horton. It commissioned Grigg's 2007 book alleging Bush and Clinton attacks on liberty, Liberty In Eclipse.

== Other activities ==
Grigg has recorded the radio spot "A Liberty Minute" weekdays since February 19, 2007, which, since July 2, has used the tagline, "Let us take back the liberty wherewith Christ has made us free" (Galatians 5:1).

Grigg was also a studio and live musician who served as lead guitarist in the Wisconsin band Slick Willie and the Calzones, until his 2005 move to Idaho. The band's 2001 CD, Green and Gold, featured rock, country, and jazz homages to the Green Bay Packers, such as the novelty song "Tailgate Polka".

He and his wife had six children.

== Death ==
Will Grigg died of a heart attack on April 12, 2017.

== Books ==
- The Gospel of Revolt: Feminism Vs. the Family. Northwest Publishing. 1992. ISBN 1-880416-75-1.
- Freedom on the Altar: The UN's Crusade Against God and Family. American Opinion Publishers. 1995. ISBN 0-9645679-0-3.
- Global Gun Grab. John Birch Society. 2001. ISBN 1-881919-05-6.
- America's Engineered Decline. John Birch Society. 2004. ISBN 1-881919-10-2.
- Liberty In Eclipse: The Rise of the Homeland Security State. Welch Foundation. December 2007.
