= Twin Falls Downtown Historic District =

Historic district in Idaho, United States

- U.S. National Register of Historic Places
- U.S. Historic district
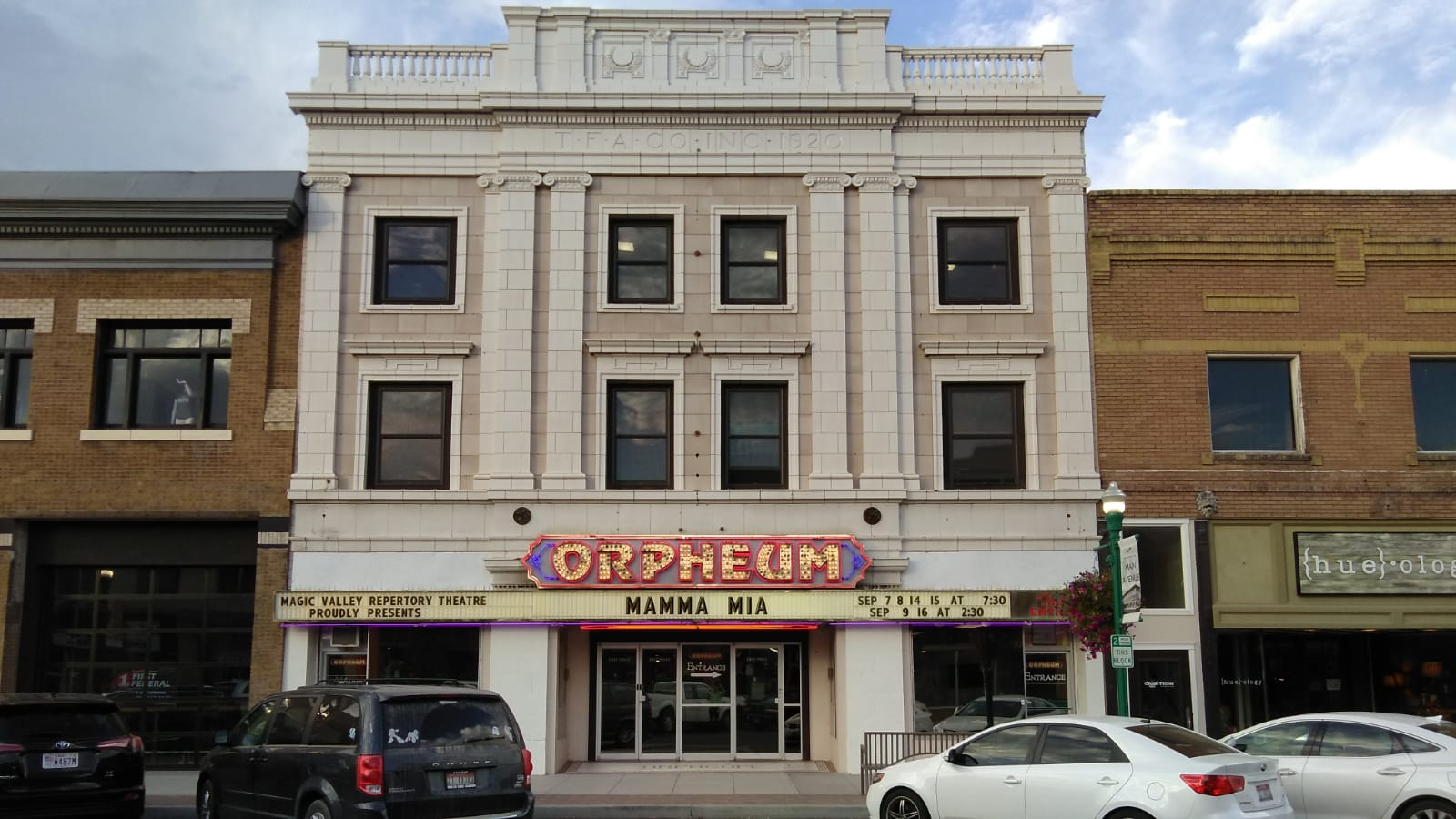
- Orpheum Theater, built 1920

- Location within Idaho Location within the United States
- Location: Roughly bounded by 2 Ave. N, 2 St. E, 2 St. W, 2 St. S, 3 Ave. S, 3 St. W., Twin Falls, Idaho
- Area: 20 acres (8.1 ha)
- Architect: Morse, Burton; et.al.
- Architectural style: Classical Revival, Art Deco
- NRHP reference No.: 00000035
- Added to NRHP: February 4, 2000

The Twin Falls Downtown Historic District is a 20 acres (8.1 ha) historic district in Twin Falls, Idaho which was listed on the National Register of Historic Places in 2000.

The 20 acres (8.1 ha) district spans 11 blocks of mostly commercial buildings, and included 42 contributing buildings and 33 non-contributing ones.

It includes works by local architects Burton Morse and Ernest Gates, and by other architects including J.H. Dodd, Houghtelling and Vissner, C. Harvey Smith, and Boise firm Wayland & Fennell.

Selected buildings include:

- Twin Falls Title and Abstract building, 202 E. Shoshone, whose main portion, with Classical Revival details, was designed by Burton Morse in 1917
- Herriott Motor Building (c.1917), 156 Second Avenue W., designed by Burton Morse. It became an auto dealership, the location of local radio station KTFI from 1932 to 1937, a ballroom named "Radioland", and during the 1940s was the Rollerdome skating rink.
- Baugh Building (1916), 102 Main Avenue N., a two-story building with a cornice, having a corner entrance and also an entry on Shoshone Street N. This was designed by Wayland & Fennell.
