= Kent Jensen =

American musician (born 1954)

- Origin: Burley, Idaho, United States
- Genres: Americana, folk, Latin American, rock, world
- Years active: 2003–present
- Label: CD Baby
- Members: Adam Cook (rhythm guitar, backing vocals); Brandon Cook (drums); Kent Jensen (electronic wind instrument, lead guitar, keyboard, lead vocals); Cubby McBride (bass guitar)
- Past members: Idumea: Robert Barrera (percussion); Ana Boyd (keyboard, viola, violin, vocals); Jason Cook (drums); Robert Hamblin (piano); Nat Parrish (bass guitar, drums); Marci Ridley (keyboard); Jeff Ringle (percussion); David Rose (bass guitar) Kent Jensen: Nat Parrish (percussion); Clayne Zollinger III (bass guitar, backing vocals)
- Website: ritmounico.com

Kent David Jensen Sr. (born March 31, 1954, in Preston, Idaho) is an American musician. Jensen first started to record and release music while living in Burley, Idaho; where he specialized in immigration and naturalization law for over twenty-two years. He now spends half of the year in Boise, Idaho and the other half in Alajuela, Costa Rica. His music consists of Americana, folk, Latin American, rock and world rhythm styles. Kent was a founding member and producer of the short-lived band, Idumea. He sang lead vocals, played lead guitar and keyboard, and wrote the majority of the lyrics. The group recorded a live album in 2003 while on tour in Hollywood, California and a Christmas album in 2004, both of which were never released. Idumea self-released three studio albums from 2005 to 2008. After the indefinite hiatus of the band in 2009, Jensen pursued a solo career. He has self-released two albums on which he sings and plays classical guitar, EWI and keyboard. In 2015, Jensen started playing with a new band which he dubbed KJ and the Burly Boys. Their latest album, Guilty Pleasure, was released that same year.

== Discography ==
=== Idumea ===
Studio albums

- Rockin' Around the Christmas Tree (2004)*
- Lies, Deception, and Innuendo (2005)
- El Peligro de la Verdad (2006)
- Little Boy Blue (2008)

Live albums

- Live from Hollywood (2003)*

Compilation albums

- A&R Unlimited: Special Edition Compilation – Volume 1 (2009)

*Album was never officially released.

=== Kent Jensen ===
Studio albums

- Dreams (2010)
- Your Familiar Face (2013)

Singles

- And It Burns (March 9, 2014)

=== KJ and the Burly Boys ===
Studio albums

- Guilty Pleasure (2015)

== Past members ==
Idumea

- Robert Barrera – percussion
- Ana Boyd – keyboard, viola, violin and vocals
- Jason Cook – drums
- Robert Hamblin – piano
- Nat Parrish – bass guitar, drums
- Marci Ridley – keyboard
- Jeff Ringle – drums & percussion
- David Rose – bass guitar

Kent Jensen

- Nat Parrish – percussion
- Clayne Zollinger III – bass guitar, backing vocalist

== Current members ==
Kent Jensen

- Adam Cook – rhythm guitar, backing vocalist
- Brandon Cook – drums
- Kent Jensen – EWI, lead guitar, keyboard, lead vocalist
- Cubby McBride – bass guitar

Additional musicians

- Carson Boyd – cello
- Ana Robins – violin, vocals

== Awards ==
In April 2009, Idumea was presented with a Grindie Award from RadioIndy for their album, Little Boy Blue.
