= Hollister School =

- U.S. National Register of Historic Places
- Location within Idaho
- Location: 2464 Salmon Ave., Hollister, Idaho
- Coordinates: 42°21′24″N 114°35′31″W
- Area: less than one acre
- Built: 1912
- Architect: Burton Morris
- Architectural style: Craftsman
- MPS: Public School Buildings in Idaho MPS
- NRHP reference No.: 91000984
- Added to NRHP: August 8, 1991

The Hollister School, at 2463 Contact Ave. in Hollister, Idaho, was built in 1912. It was listed on the National Register of Historic Places in 1991.

It was designed by Twin Falls architect Burton Morse. It is a brick building, with brick laid in running bond. It appears to be three stories high, though it has been termed as two-stories with a raised basement. Its entrances are into the "basement" level.

Its design includes a few elements of Craftsman style, in its roof rafters being exposed, and in its small entry porches having Craftsman style brackets.

It was funded by a $30,000 bond, approved 52–0 in January 1912 by citizens of Hollister. Classes began in part of the building in September 1912, while construction continued.

It has also been known as Hollister Elementary.

The school was deemed significant as "it represents the early settlement of Twin Falls County and more specifically, the organization of the Salmon River irrigation project" which reclaimed a large area by use of Milner Dam (1904) and Salmon Dam (1909), the latter being the largest dam in the U.S. northwest and the third largest in the world, at the time.

The irrigation project partly failed, in not providing enough water, in part because lava rock in the Salmon Dam leaked water. Hollister failed to thrive, and the local high school moved to the second floor of this building. The building included a gymnasium, which was damaged by 1925 by the large crowds during basketball games, so athletic events had to be moved elsewhere. The high school was consolidated with a school district based in Filer, Idaho in 1948; this building continued to be used as an elementary school thereafter.

It is located in a sagebrush desert area, about .5 miles (0.80 km) west of U.S. Route 93.
