= George W. Pace =

American religious scholar

George Wendell Pace (October 10, 1929 – November 7, 2020) was an American professor of religion at Brigham Young University (BYU) in Provo, Utah. He was a popular writer and speaker on religion in the Church of Jesus Christ of Latter-day Saints (LDS Church) and was presumably connected to public criticism voiced by apostle Bruce R. McConkie in 1982.

== Biography ==
Pace was one of twelve children born to Agnes Judd and Presley D. Pace in Burley, Idaho. He was raised in the town, where his father served as Sheriff for sixteen years. As a young man and a member of the LDS Church, Pace served a proselyting mission in western Canada.

In the late 1940s, Pace studied at Utah State Agricultural College in Logan, where he also ran cross-country. While later attending BYU, Pace met and married Diane Carman of Portland, Oregon, with whom he would have twelve children.

Pace would go on to serve in various callings in the LDS Church throughout his life, including as a Sunday School teacher in Provo, Utah, high councilor, branch president at the Missionary Training Center, stake presidency counselor, and stake president.

He died on November 7, 2020, at his residence in Provo, Utah.

=== Career ===
Pace had decided to teach LDS religion after several spiritual experiences. After graduating from BYU in political science, he returned to his hometown of Burley to teach seminary for the church in 1956, living on the family farm.

In 1961, Pace was appointed as the first director of the Institute of Religion adjacent to Colorado State University in Fort Collins, Colorado, where he then completed a master's degree. In 1964 Pace became director of the Institute in Palo Alto, California, adjacent to Stanford University. Pace was accepted into the religion faculty at BYU in 1967. He completed his master's degree in 1968 and his doctorate in religious education in 1976.

As one of the most popular BYU professors, next to Stephen Covey, Pace regularly drew attendees larger than his actual class size. In 1978, BYU students named him professor of the year and he was known for spending large amounts of time helping students. Pace was also a popular speaker in BYU's Education Week and Know Your Religion programs, and had several motivational talks recorded and sold on cassette tapes.

Pace was one of the few BYU faculty to vigorously oppose the appointment of Leonard J. Arrington as the LDS Church's historian; Arrington was the first church historian with professional academic qualifications and also the first to not also hold a high place in the ecclesiastical hierarchy. In September 1976, with apostle Ezra Taft Benson's assistant William Nelson, Pace wrote an anonymous critique of The Story of the Latter-day Saints as insufficiently reverential, which Benson and Mark E. Petersen then used to attack Arrington specifically and the professional attitude of the history department generally in a subsequent meeting with the First Presidency. It was decided that the volume would not be advertised by the church-owned publisher, Deseret Book, and all future manuscripts of the department must be read by an apostle before publication. Howard W. Hunter was in charge of the History Department at the time, resented being circumvented, and privately told Arrington he felt that Benson and Petersen's suggestion of concealing historical fact and adopting a uniformly providentialist point-of-view would have been "unethical and immoral" in a court of law. On November 24, Arrington learned that church president Spencer W. Kimball had read the entire book himself, found nothing objectionable, and quietly removed all restrictions on marketing or endorsing the book.

=== McConkie criticism ===
In 1982, Bruce R. McConkie, an LDS Church apostle, presented a televised sermon at BYU that was interpreted by some as an attack on Pace's book, What It Means to Know Christ. In his sermon, McConkie did not mention Pace or his book by name, though he excerpted a quote which he called "plain sectarian nonsense," and warned against developing a special spiritual relationship with Jesus Christ, apart from the Holy Ghost and God the Father. McConkie felt this was a "gospel hobby" that could lead to "an unwholesome holier-than-thou attitude" or "despondence." McConkie said he didn't intend to "downgrade" Jesus, but to teach true doctrine and warn his audience. McConkie later stated he wasn't singling out or specifically thinking of Pace, but was warning against a general trend of "extreme behavior" of born-again type experiences.

According to his son, Pace was personally devastated and saw this as a public condemnation and rebuke. He removed his book from the market, was released from his church position as stake president, and had a dramatic drop in class enrollment. Pace issued a formal apology in which he stated that his opinions may be misinterpreted, and he was glad that McConkie had clarified the issues. Pace wanted "to stay in the mainstream of the church" and remain loyal to its leadership. In contrast, Pace's son cited the controversy as disillusioning him toward his religious leaders and motivating him to leave the LDS Church.

Some have speculated that McConkie was reprimanded for downplaying Christ's importance and was asked to reemphasize Jesus in his future teachings.

=== Afterward ===
After the fallout from the McConkie incident, Pace retained his BYU religious professorship and served in leadership positions in the church. He served for a time as a professor at the BYU Jerusalem Center. Remembered as an effective teacher, in 2000 BYU Magazine printed his nomination for professor of the century. In the early 2000s Pace and his wife were overseeing BYU's China Teachers Program, which arranges for retired educators from BYU to teach at Chinese universities.

Pace also continued publishing and public speaking in the LDS community. His work was published in an official LDS Church magazine and in the church-sanctioned Encyclopedia of Mormonism. Though originally published by Council Press, Pace's criticized book What It Means to Know Christ was even republished in 1988 by the church's own publisher, Deseret Book, as a new edition retitled Our Search to Know the Lord. The work remains in print under the name Knowing Christ, published by Cedar Fort, Inc. As a public speaker, Pace addressed addiction recovery programs and other groups into the late 1990s.

== Published works ==
In 1975, Pace compiled a book of faith-promoting experiences entitled The Faith of Young Mormons.

In 1981, Pace published What it Means to Know Christ, which sold very well. After Bruce R. McConkie's public criticisms, Pace revised the book and published it as Our Search to Know the Lord in 1988, and Knowing Christ in 1996. Pace was a contributor to the Encyclopedia of Mormonism in 1992.

The following is a list of Pace's works:

- Pace, George W. (c. 1967). The Diary of John D. Lee (1846); An Edited Sample. [paper written for Church History 543]. Provo, Utah.
- —— (c. 1968). The Evolution of Political Parties in Utah--1848-1905. [written in partial fulfillment of the requirements for Religion 543]. Provo, Utah.
- —— (1973). "What it Means to Know Christ". California Know Your Religion Speeches, 1973-74. pp. 77–104.
- —— (1974). "Living by the Spirit". California Know Your Religion Speeches, 1971-72. pp. 41–68.
- —— (September 1974). "What It Means to Know Christ". Ensign: 42.
- —— (1975). The Faith of Young Mormons. Provo, Utah: Communications Workshop; A Division of Milo Baughman Design, Inc.
- —— (1975). "Developing a Personal Relationship with the Savior". BYU Speeches of the Year. [BYU devotional address given July 15, 1975]. pp. 169–185. Archived from the original on August 8, 2007.
- —— (1976). The Effectiveness of Mission Presidents of the Church of Jesus Christ of the Latter-day Saints as Measured by Six Selected Criteria. [doctoral thesis]. Department of Church History and Doctrine, Brigham Young University.
- —— (1981). What it Means to Know Christ. Provo, Utah: Council Press. ISBN 0-936860-05-7.
- —— (November 1983). "Q&A: Questions and Answers: How can I grow and develop confidence in my ability to use my free agency if I'm supposed to get to the point where the Holy Ghost guides my every decision—or am I misunderstanding something?". New Era: 11.
- —— (1985). "A New Commandment". Principles of the Gospel in Practice. [13th Annual Sidney B. Sperry Symposium, Brigham Young University]. Salt Lake City, Utah: Randall Book Co. pp. 135–146. ISBN 0-934126-76-3.
- —— (1988). Our Search to Know the Lord. [new edition of What it Means to Know Christ]. Salt Lake City, Utah: Deseret Book. ISBN 978-0-87579-136-4.
- —— (1992). "Kingdom of God". Encyclopedia of Mormonism. Vol. 2. Macmillan. Archived from the original on 2009-06-27.
- —— (1992). "Doctrine and Covenants: Section 1". Encyclopedia of Mormonism. Vol. 1. Macmillan. Archived from the original on 2009-09-04.
- —— (1996). Knowing Christ. [new edition of Our Search to Know the Lord] (3rd ed.). Springville, Utah: Cedar Fort. ISBN 0-87579-136-0.
- —— (2007). Knowing Christ. [paperback]. Springville, Utah: Cedar Fort. ISBN 978-1-55517-261-9.

=== Audio recordings ===
- —— (1980). George W. Pace, Live on Cassettes. 3 audio cassettes. Salt Lake City: Covenant Recordings..
- —— (1980). Ten Commandments of Prayer. 2 audio cassettes. Salt Lake City: Covenant Recordings..
- —— (June 11, 1981). From Fatherhood to Godhood. Sound recording. Harold B. Lee Library, Brigham Young University..
- —— (1986). The Second Coming. audio cassette. Salt Lake City: Covenant Recordings..
- —— (1987). The Atonement. audio cassette. Salt Lake City: Covenant Recordings. ISBN 1-55503-232-X..
- —— (1988). Power, Principles & Programs. audio cassette. Salt Lake City: Covenant Recordings..
- —— (1990). Come Unto Christ; The Holy Ghost, the Gift of Gifts. audio cassette. Salt Lake City: Covenant Communications. ISBN 1-55503-248-6..
- —— (1990). How to Defuse the Dynamite in Dating. audio cassette. Salt Lake City: Covenant Communications. ISBN 1-55503-268-0..
- —— (1998). A Savior-Centered Marriage. audio cassette. Covenant Communications..
- —— (1998). A Perfect Brightness of Hope. audio cassette. Covenant Communications..
