= Bruce R. McConkie =

American LDS Church leader (1915–1985)

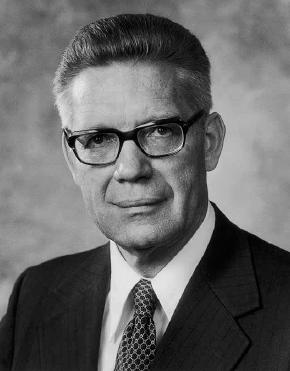
- McConkie in 1976, as a member of the Board of Trustees of BYU

Quorum of the Twelve Apostles
- October 12, 1972 – April 19, 1985
- Called by: Harold B. Lee

LDS Church Apostle
- October 12, 1972 – April 19, 1985
- Called by: Harold B. Lee
- Reason: Death of Joseph Fielding Smith and reorganization of First Presidency
- Reorganization at end of term: M. Russell Ballard ordained

First Council of the Seventy
- October 6, 1946 – October 12, 1972
- Called by: George Albert Smith
- End reason: Called to the Quorum of the Twelve Apostles

Military career
- 1937–1946
- Service/branch: United States Army
- Rank: Lieutenant Colonel
- Unit: Military Intelligence Corps

Personal details
- Born: Bruce Redd McConkie; July 29, 1915; Ann Arbor, Michigan, U.S.
- Died: April 19, 1985 (aged 69); Salt Lake City, Utah, U.S.
- Resting place: Salt Lake City Cemetery; 40.777°N 111.858°W
- Spouse(s): Amelia Smith
- Children: 9
- Parents: Oscar W. McConkie; Margaret V. Redd

Bruce Redd McConkie (July 29, 1915 – April 19, 1985) was a member of the Quorum of the Twelve Apostles of the Church of Jesus Christ of Latter-day Saints (LDS Church) from 1972 until his death. McConkie was a member of the LDS Church's First Council of the Seventy from 1946 until his calling to the Quorum of the Twelve.

During his time as a general authority, McConkie published several doctrinal books and articles and wrote the chapter headings of the LDS Church's 1979–81 editions of the standard works.

McConkie received both a bachelor's degree and JD from the University of Utah. He spent his childhood between Monticello, Utah; Salt Lake City, Utah; and Ann Arbor, Michigan. In 1937, he married Amelia Smith (1916–2005), a daughter of Joseph Fielding Smith, who later became LDS Church president.

== Early years ==
McConkie was born in Ann Arbor, Michigan, to Oscar Walter McConkie and Margaret Vivian Redd. Before he was a year old, his family moved to Monticello, Utah. In 1925, his family moved back to Ann Arbor, where his father continued studying law and in 1926, they moved to Salt Lake City, Utah. McConkie attended Bryant Junior High School and LDS High School, where he graduated at fifteen. He attended three years of college at the University of Utah before he served a church mission.

McConkie followed his father's preaching style and doctrinal views but differed from his father politically, as McConkie was a Republican, and his father was a Democrat.

== Eastern States Mission ==
On September 6, 1934, McConkie received a call to serve in the Eastern States Mission, with Don B. Colton as his mission president. His first assignment was in Pittsburgh, Pennsylvania. From May 1 to July 24, 1935, he served in the Cumorah District in Palmyra, New York, as part of an intensive missionary campaign tied to the dedication of a monument to Moroni on the Hill Cumorah. McConkie then served in the Seneca District and later presided over it.

In 1936, McConkie participated in the first Hill Cumorah Pageant, which was attended by his future father-in-law, Joseph Fielding Smith. At the end of his second year of missionary service, McConkie "extended his mission for six weeks to travel, without a companion, from town to town throughout the mission, teaching investigators and missionaries," at the request of his mission president.

== Education, marriage, and family ==
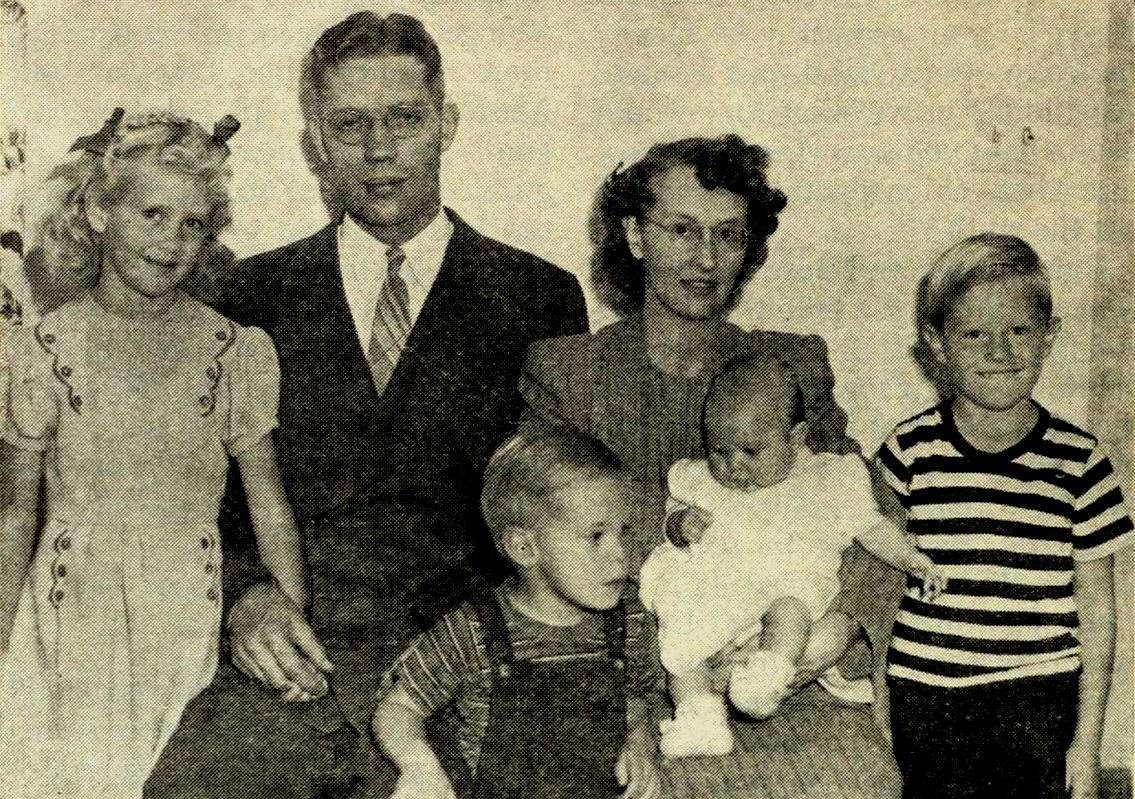
McConkie with his wife, Amelia, and their children, c. 1946.

McConkie met Amelia Smith, daughter of Joseph Fielding Smith, before his mission while attending the University of Utah. He and Amelia graduated with bachelor's degrees in June 1937, hers being in bacteriology and pathology. They were married in the Salt Lake Temple by Amelia's father on October 13, 1937. Together, they had nine children: Bruce (1938-1938), Vivian (1940–2024), Joseph (1941–2013), Stanford (1944), Mary (1946–2021), Mark (1948–2018), Rebecca (1950), Stephen (1951), and Sara (1957). Their oldest child, Bruce, lived less than two months.

McConkie graduated with a bachelor of laws degree in 1939 and was third out of seventy-five on the Utah bar exam. His degree was automatically changed to juris doctor in June 1967. Following his graduation, McConkie worked as assistant city attorney in Salt Lake City.

== Military service ==
McConkie enrolled in Army ROTC while at the University of Utah. With the advent of World War II, he was called to active duty service on March 5, 1942. He served in military intelligence at Fort Douglas for the duration of the war and received the American Campaign Medal and the World War II Victory Medal. He held the rank of Lieutenant Colonel at his discharge on February 26, 1946. He had been one of the youngest in Army Intelligence to hold that rank.

== Call to the Seventy ==
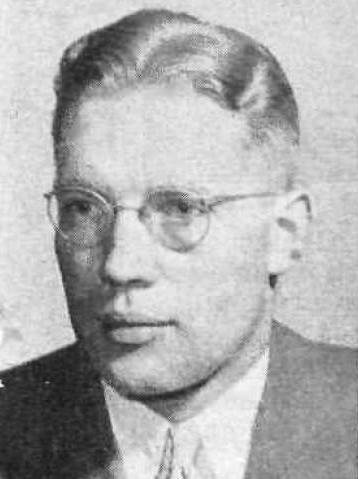
McConkie, ca. 1946, while a member of the First Council of Seventy.

McConkie worked for a time as a reporter for the Deseret News. While covering the proceedings of the LDS Church's general conference on October 6, 1946, McConkie was interviewed by apostle David O. McKay to fill a vacancy in the First Council of the Seventy created by the death of John H. Taylor. McConkie's name was presented for a sustaining vote by the membership of the church that same day, and on October 10, he was ordained and set apart by George Albert Smith. He served as a member of the First Council of the Seventy for 26 years.

On June 11, 1961, McConkie was ordained a high priest by Henry D. Moyle of the church's First Presidency. This was necessary because of a new policy requiring the First Seven Presidents of Seventy to assist the Quorum of the Twelve Apostles in setting apart stake presidents, stake high councilors, and bishops.

== Mormon Doctrine ==
In 1958, McConkie published a book, Mormon Doctrine: A Compendium of the Gospel, which he described as "the first major attempt to digest, explain, and analyze all of the important doctrines of the kingdom" and "the first extensive compendium of the whole gospel—the first attempt to publish an encyclopedic commentary covering the whole field of revealed religion." He included a disclaimer that he alone was responsible for the doctrinal and scriptural interpretations, a practice then unusual.

In writing the book, McConkie relied heavily upon the church's standard works and recognized doctrinal authorities. Church leaders were surprised by its publication since he had not asked permission and was not asked to develop such a work, and they responded that while they applauded the attempt of the book to fill a need, it used a harsh tone. Apostle Mark E. Petersen called it "full of errors and misstatements, and it is most unfortunate that it has received such wide circulation." Church president David O. McKay asked McConkie not to reprint it, but later, McConkie was asked to revise it with the editorial help of Spencer W. Kimball. The 1966 second edition incorporated many changes, such as a softening of the tone.

While almost all of the Bible Dictionary included with the LDS Church's publication of the Bible in 1979 borrows from the Cambridge University Press bible dictionary, modifications were made to some entries to reflect Mormon beliefs better, and Mormon Doctrine heavily influenced those changes. Mormon Doctrine remained in print until 2010, when Deseret Book ceased publication, citing poor sales.

== Mission to Australia ==
On February 9, 1961, McConkie was called to serve as president of the Southern Australian Mission, which encompassed all of western and southern Australia. Their daughter, Vivian, was married and son, Joseph, was serving a mission in Scotland, so six of their children accompanied them to Australia.

In October 1962, McConkie reported "an all-time high mark in mission converts and willingness of members to build new chapels.... There has been no difficulty getting six building missionaries to work on each chapel under the supervision of supervisors called from the states."

Under McConkie, the mission decided upon a motto of "Seek the Spirit", and McConkie focused on teaching the missionaries humility and listening for the whisperings of the Holy Ghost.

McConkie resumed his duties as a President of the Seventy after returning to Utah in 1964.

== Memorial Estates Security Corporation ==
In August 1960 McConkie, along with several other businessmen (including J. Thomas Fyans), formed the Memorial Estates Security Corporation (MESC), with a stated purpose of constructing memorial parks for deceased "loved ones." McConkie became its vice president. By September 1964, the company was failing, and in November, MESC filed for bankruptcy. McConkie, along with fourteen other MESC officials, were sued by 270 stockholders and bondholders of the company, accusing the company of prominently displaying LDS Church affiliation to imply endorsement in initial sales pitches. The suit also accused the company of failing to register as an investment company with the U.S. Securities and Exchange Commission as required by law.

In a questionnaire sent to all investors, it was found that two thirds of all investors were elderly (ages 60–75), who had invested fifteen times as much as persons thirty years and under and four times as much as those in middle age. When asked why they contributed to the company, close to half mentioned trust in McConkie or other LDS Church leaders specifically. Further investigation showed that the company had failed to pay dividends long before its collapse, and failed to inform investors of its insolvency. The case was settled out of court on April 25, 1969, three days before going before a jury trial.

== Call to the Twelve ==
Joseph Fielding Smith, McConkie's father-in-law, who had been serving as church president, died on July 2, 1972. The First Presidency was subsequently reorganized with Harold B. Lee as president, leaving a vacancy in the Quorum of the Twelve Apostles. In October 1972, McConkie was invited to Lee's office "where President Lee put his arms around him by way of greeting and said, 'The Lord and the Brethren have just called you to fill the vacancy in the Council of the Twelve.' Bruce responded, 'I know. This is no surprise to me. I have known it for some time.'"

McConkie served as an apostle until he died of cancer at 69.

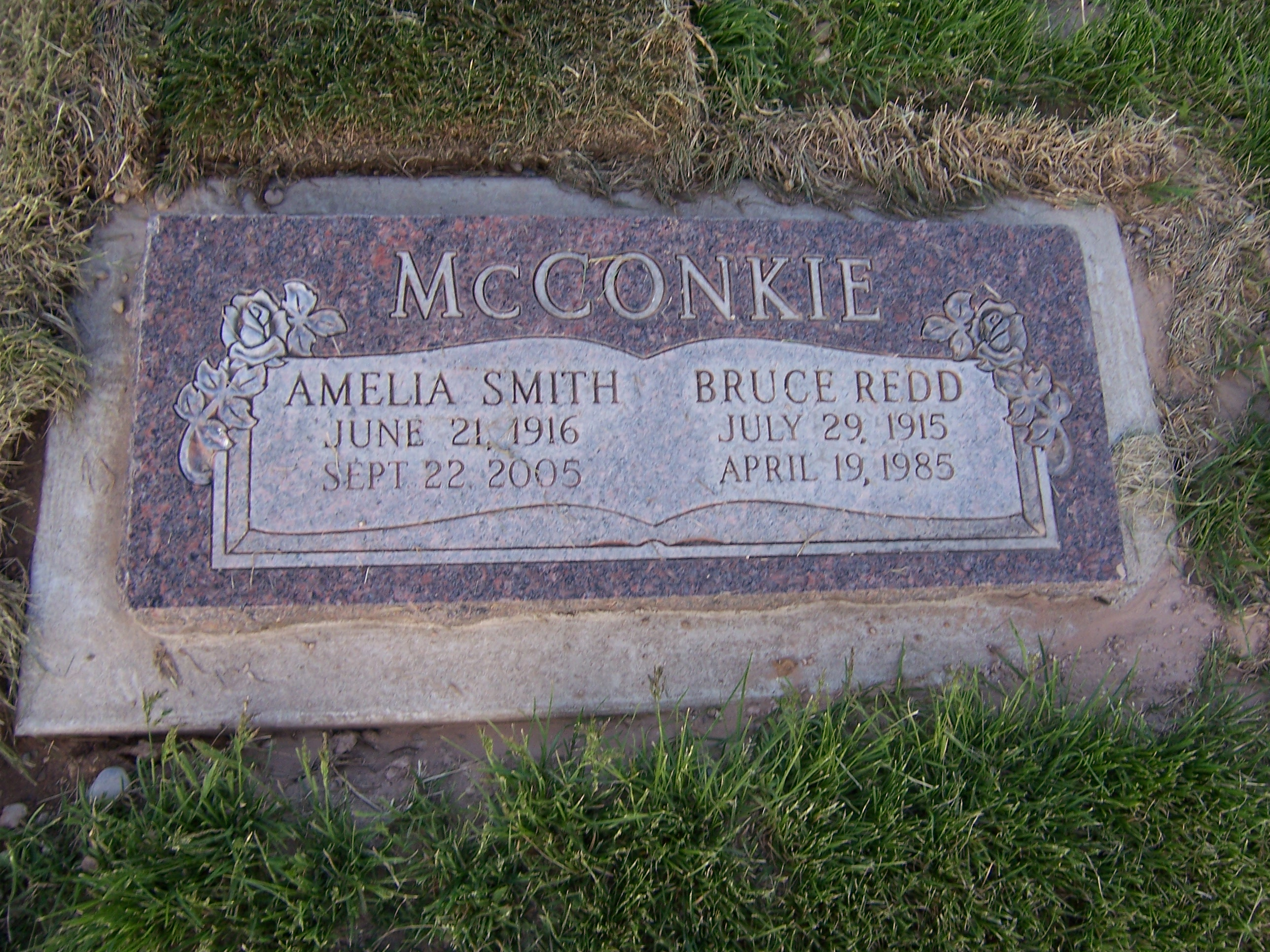
Grave marker of Bruce R. McConkie.

== Poetry ==
McConkie wrote several poems, a few of which he read in various general conference addresses. He wrote the poem "I Believe in Christ," which he delivered in a 1972 general conference address, "The Testimony of Jesus." It was later set to music and was published in the LDS hymnal as hymn number 134.

McConkie also wrote the fourth verse to "Come, Listen to a Prophet's Voice" which is hymn #21 in the church's 1985 hymnal.

== Final testimony ==
McConkie gave many general conference addresses. His last conference address was in April 1985: "The Purifying Power of Gethsemane." McConkie died in Salt Lake City less than two weeks later. He was buried at Salt Lake City Cemetery.

== Critique ==
McConkie's works in general are characterized by their authoritative tone. McConkie once wrote to a Mormon scholar in 1980, "It is my province to teach to the church what the doctrine is. It is your province to echo what I say or to remain silent." In his bestselling Doctrinal New Testament Commentaries and Messiah series, the sources most frequently cited as authority are other works authored by himself. He explained, "I would never quote another man unless I could first square what he said with the scriptures and unless he said what was involved better than I could."

McConkie comments about Jews in his book The Millennial Messiah: "Let this fact be engraved in the eternal records with a pen of steel: the Jews were cursed, and smitten, and cursed anew, because they rejected the gospel, cast out their Messiah, and crucified their King."

McConkie states that the Jews' rejection of Jesus is the cause of historical persecution of the Jews: "Let the spiritually illiterate suppose what they may, it was the Jewish denial and rejection of the Holy One of Israel, whom their fathers worshiped in the beauty of holiness, that has made them a hiss and a byword in all nations and that has taken millions of their fair sons and daughters to untimely graves."

One of the most controversial topics that McConkie defended in his writings was the church's policy of denying the priesthood to men of African descent until 1978. His basis for this defense was that in his view, those of black African descent had been less valiant in the premortal life, which the LDS Church teaches was a precursor to life on earth. In 1958, McConkie wrote:

In the pre-existent eternity various degrees of valiance and devotion to the truth were exhibited by different groups of our Father's spirit offspring. One-third of the spirit hosts of heaven came out in open rebellion and were cast out without bodies, becoming the devil and his angels. The other two-thirds stood affirmatively for Christ: there were no neutrals. To stand neutral in the midst of war is a philosophical impossibility.

Of the two-thirds who followed Christ, however, some were more valiant than others. Those who were less valiant in pre-existence and who thereby had certain spiritual restrictions imposed upon them during mortality are known to us as the negroes. Negroes in this life are denied the priesthood; under no circumstances can they hold this delegation of authority from the Almighty.

The present status of the negro rests purely and simply on the foundation of pre-existence. Along with all races and peoples he is receiving here what he merits as a result of the long pre-mortal probation in the presence of the Lord. The principle is the same as will apply when all men are judged according to their mortal works and are awarded varying statuses in the life hereafter.

McConkie extended the analysis to conclude that God had established a caste system that proscribed intermarriage of other races with the "negro race," which McConkie believed to be descended from Cain, the murderer of Abel: "In a broad general sense, caste systems have their root and origin in the gospel itself, and when they operate according to the divine decree, the resultant restrictions and segregation are right and proper and have the approval of the Lord. To illustrate: Cain, Ham, and the whole negro race have been cursed with a black skin, the mark of Cain, so they can be identified as a caste apart, a people with whom the other descendants of Adam should not intermarry.”

On June 1, 1978, McConkie was present in the Salt Lake Temple when a revelation was received by the First Presidency and the Twelve "that the time had now come to extend the gospel and all its blessings and all its obligations, including the priesthood and the blessings of the house of the Lord, to those of every nation, culture and race, including the black race." This revelation was announced on June 8, 1978.

McConkie's earlier statements on the topic, like those of other church leaders, implied or stated that the priesthood restriction would never be lifted. McConkie addressed that by stating that his earlier statements should not be relied upon and that those who asked about them needed to "forget" what he had said:

There are statements in our literature by the early Brethren that we have interpreted to mean that the Negroes would not receive the priesthood in mortality. I have said the same things, and people write me letters and say, "You said such and such, and how is it now that we do such and such?" All I can say is that it is time disbelieving people repented and got in line and believed in a living, modern prophet. Forget everything that I have said, or what President Brigham Young or George Q. Cannon or whoever has said in days past that is contrary to the present revelation. We spoke with a limited understanding and without the light and knowledge that now has come into the world. It doesn't make a particle of difference what anybody ever said about the Negro matter before the first day of June 1978. It is a new day and a new arrangement, and the Lord has now given the revelation that sheds light out into the world on this subject. As to any slivers of light or any particles of darkness of the past, we forget about them. We now do what meridian Israel did when the Lord said the gospel should go to the Gentiles. We forget all the statements that limited the gospel to the house of Israel, and we start going to the Gentiles.

== Published works ==
- Doctrines of Salvation, by Joseph Fielding Smith, compiled by Bruce R McConkie: Volume 1, 1954; Volume 2, 1955; Volume 3, 1956.
- Mormon Doctrine, A Compendium of the Gospel, 1958.
- Mormon Doctrine, Second Edition, 1966.
- Doctrinal New Testament Commentary: Volume 1, The Gospels, 1965. Volume 2, Acts–Philippians, 1970. Volume 3, Colossians–Revelation, 1972.
- The Messiah Series, six-volume set that includes the following three Messiah titles
  - The Promised Messiah, 1978.
  - The Mortal Messiah, four volumes, 1979–81.
  - The Millennial Messiah, 1982.
- A New Witness for the Articles of Faith, 1985
- McConkie also wrote numerous articles for the Church News and church magazines, handbooks, pamphlets, and manuals. In 1981, he re-wrote the chapter headings for the LDS Church's publication of the Book of Mormon. He also wrote the chapter headings for the rest of the church-published standard works and contributed to the Bible Dictionary.

== See also ==
- George W. Pace

== Notes ==
The Church of Jesus Christ of Latter-day Saints titles
Preceded by Marvin J. Ashton	Quorum of the Twelve Apostles; October 6, 1972 – April 19, 1985	Succeeded by L. Tom Perry
