= Burley Municipal Airport =

Airport in Idaho, United States of America

Burley Municipal Airport Burley J R Jack Simplot Airport
- IATA: BYI; ICAO: KBYI; FAA LID: BYI

Summary
- Airport type: Public
- Owner: City of Burley
- Serves: Burley, Idaho
- Elevation AMSL: 4,150 ft (1,260 m)
- Coordinates: 42°32′33″N 113°46′18″W
- Website: BurleyIdaho.org/airport.htm

Map
- Interactive map of Burley Municipal Airport

Runways
Direction	Length		Surface
Direction	ft	m	Surface
2/20	4,094	1,248	Asphalt
6/24	4,067	1,240	Asphalt

Statistics (2005)
- Aircraft operations: 27,750
- Based aircraft: 56
- Sources: FAA, Burley website

Burley Municipal Airport (IATA: BYI, ICAO: KBYI, FAA LID: BYI) is a municipal airport in Burley, Idaho. The airport was rededicated as Burley J R Jack Simplot Airport in October 2002, honoring J. R. "Jack" Simplot.

== History ==
The Burley Municipal Airport was dedicated on July 4, 1930. A stop on the Contract Air Mail Route 5 (CAM5) from Salt Lake City to Pasco, the airport began its life servicing Air Mail aircraft.

The first airline flights were Empire Airlines Boeing 247s in 1946; successors West Coast Airlines and Air West landed at Burley until 1969.

== Facilities ==
The airport covers 201 acres (81 ha) and has two asphalt runways: 2/20 is 4,094 x 80 ft (1,248 x 24 m) and 6/24 is 4,067 x 75 ft (1,240 x 23 m).

In the year ending February 10, 2005, the airport had 27,750 aircraft operations, average 76 per day: 98% general aviation, 1% air taxi and <1% military. 56 aircraft are based at this airport: 84% single-engine, 10% multi-engine, 4% jet and 2% ultralight.

== Accidents and incidents ==
- On April 13, 2022, a Cessna 208B Caravan registration N928JP on a cargo flight operated by Gem Air from Salt Lake City International Airport crashed into the agglomerate stack of Gem State Processing food processing plant while on approach to the airport. The high temperature steam exhaust, also from the plant, may have contributed to the crash by not only visually obscuring the runway from the pilot, but also lowering the air density causing the aircraft to lose altitude. The pilot, who was the only occupant on board, was fatally injured.

A panoramic view of JR Simplot Airport, as seen from a public access road to its east.

== See also ==
- List of airports in Idaho
