= Twin Falls Original Townsite Residential Historic District =

Historic district in Idaho, United States

- U.S. National Register of Historic Places
- U.S. Historic district
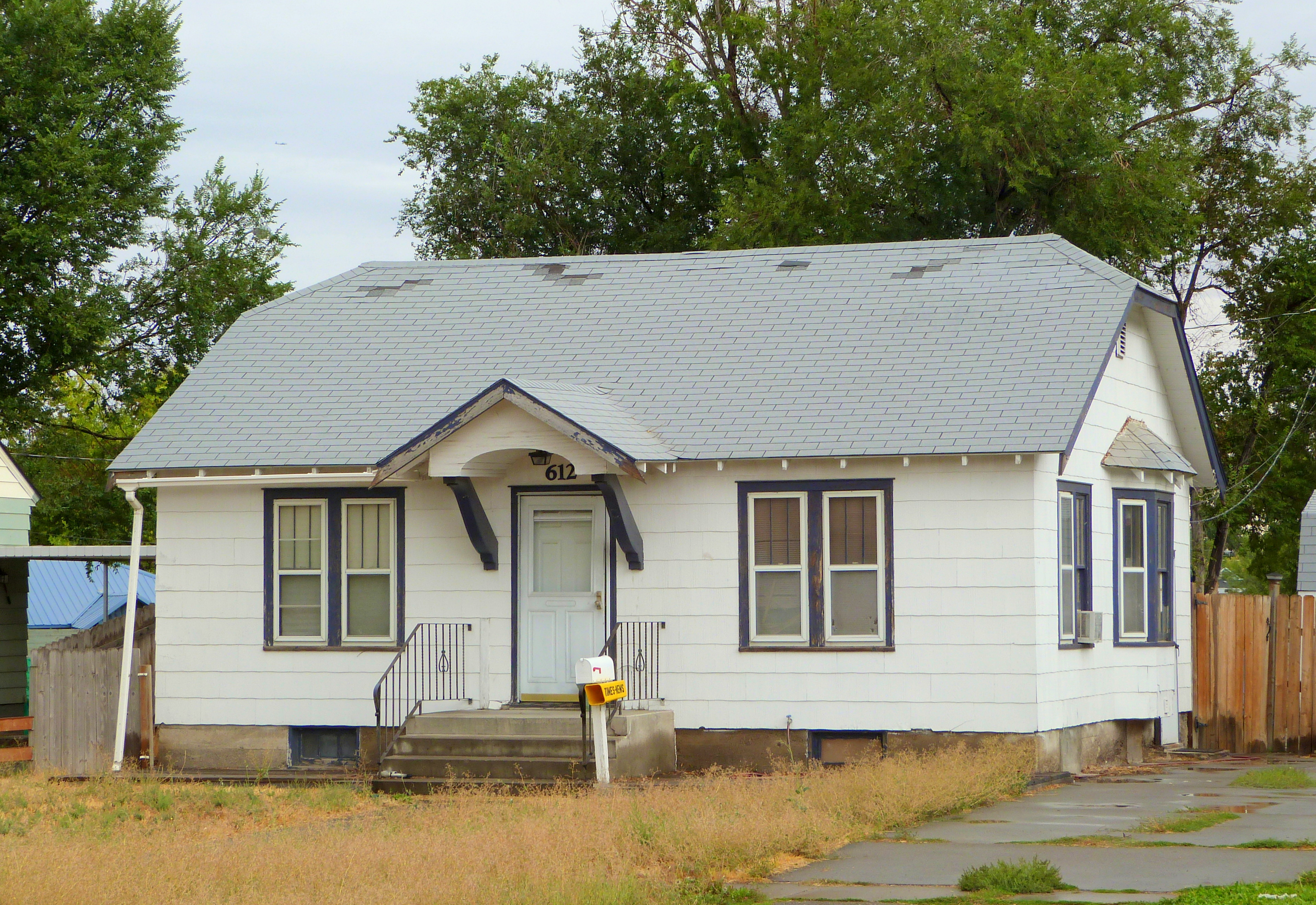
- The house at 612 4th Avenue North in 2016
- Location: Roughly bounded by Blue Lakes Ave., Addison Ave., 2nd Ave. E, and 2nd Ave. W, Twin Falls, Idaho
- Coordinates: 42°33′36″N 114°28′12″W
- Area: 264 acres (1.07 km^{2})
- Built by: Morse, Burton; Smith, C. Harvey, et al
- Architectural style: multiple
- NRHP reference No.: 01001306
- Added to NRHP: November 30, 2001

The Twin Falls Original Townsite Residential Historic District in Twin Falls, Idaho is a 264 acres (1.07 km^{2}) historic district which was listed on the National Register of Historic Places in 2001.

The district is roughly triangular, and roughly bounded by Blue Lakes Ave., Addison Ave., 2nd Ave. E, and 2nd Ave. W. It included 929 buildings, of which 624 were contributing buildings.

The district includes the Bickel School and the Lincoln School, both of which are listed separately on the National Register.
