= Ramona Theater =

- U.S. National Register of Historic Places
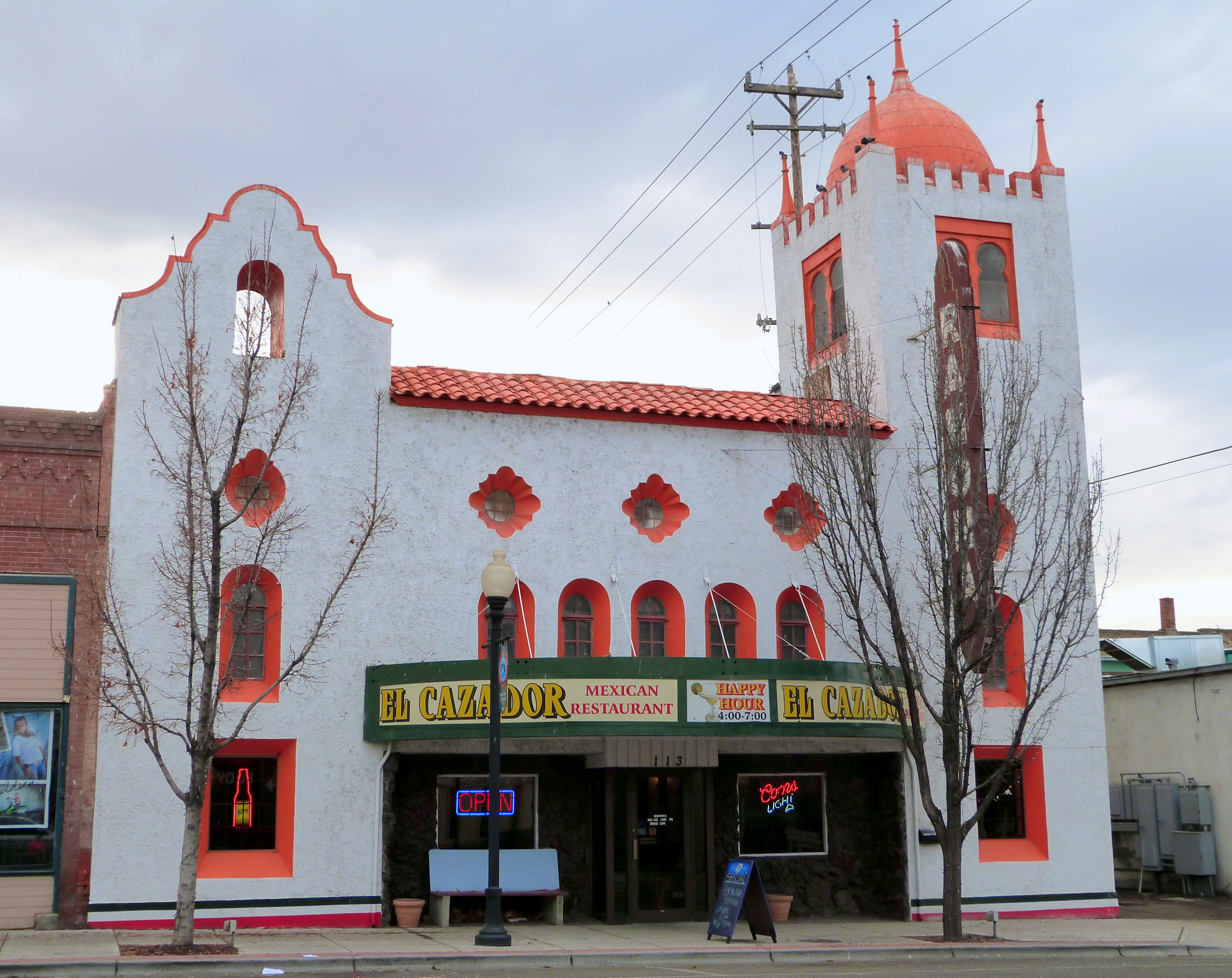

- Location within Idaho Location within the United States
- Location: 113 Broadway, Buhl, Idaho
- Coordinates: 42°35′55″N 114°45′31″W
- Area: less than one acre
- Built: 1928
- Architect: Burton Morse
- NRHP reference No.: 76000682
- Added to NRHP: December 22, 1976

The Ramona Theater, at 113 Broadway in Buhl, Idaho, was built in 1928. It was listed on the National Register of Historic Places in 1976.

It was designed by architect Burton Morse. Built during a decade of a numerous constructions of movie theatres with varying architectural themes, this featured a mix of "Spanish Mission and Islamic elements, suggesting something from the movie sets of the day—perhaps those in Douglas Fairbanks' Thief of Bagdad, produced in 1924. Its pink stucco mass is accented with a four story corner tower 41 feet tall, topped by a mosque-like dome." Parts of a predecessor building on the site, the Wade Building, were incorporated into the construction.
