= Burley, Idaho =

- City
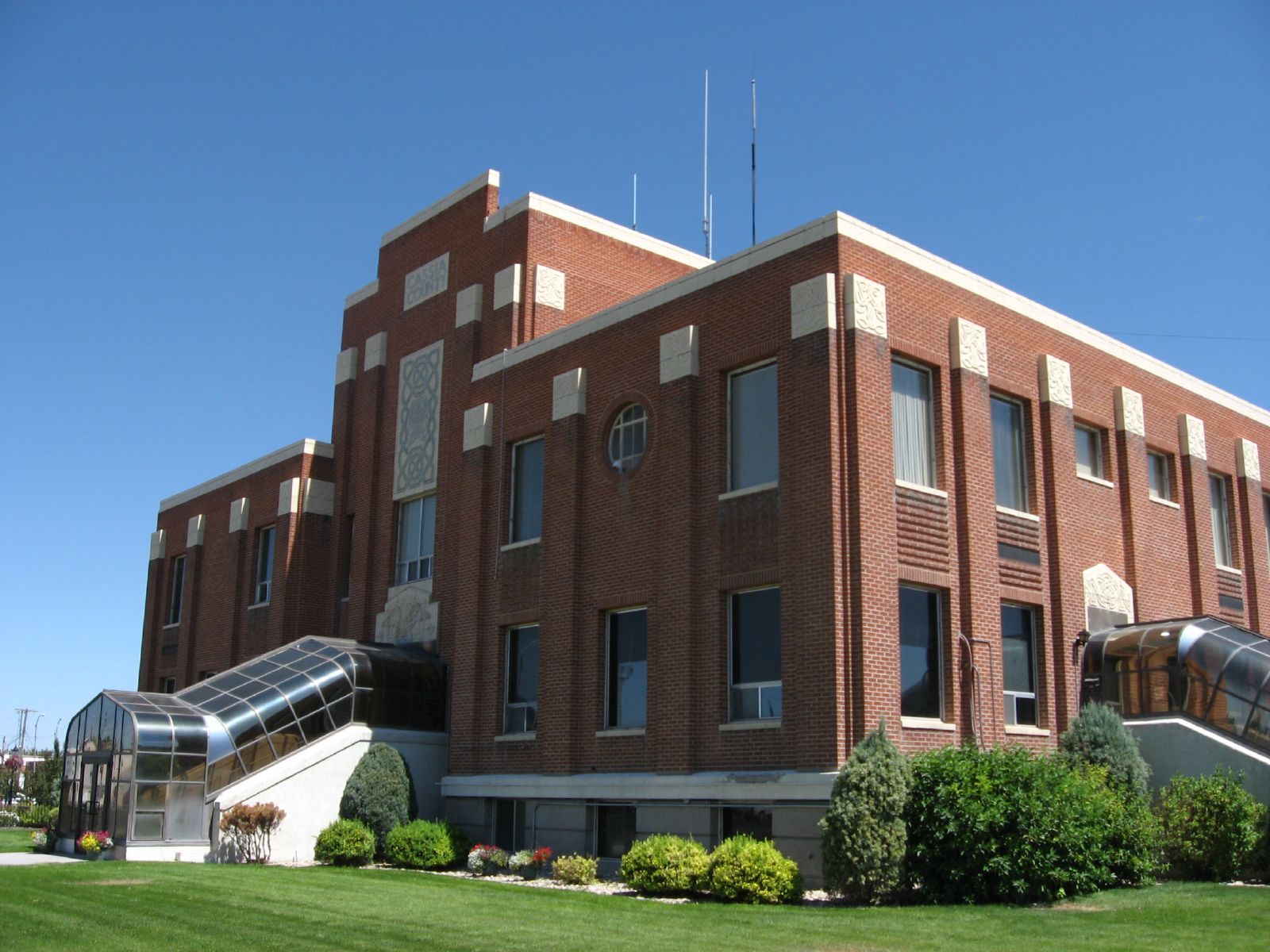
- Cassia County Courthouse

- Location in Cassia County and Minidoka County, Idaho

- Location in the United States
- Coordinates: 42°32′14″N 113°47′31″W
- Country: United States
- State: Idaho
- Counties: Cassia, Minidoka
- Established: Incorporated 1905

Government
  - Mayor: Steve Ormond

Area
  - Total: 7.00 sq mi (18.1 km^{2})
  - Land: 6.67 sq mi (17.3 km^{2})
  - Water: 0.33 sq mi (0.85 km^{2})
- Elevation: 4,160 ft (1,270 m)

Population (2020)
  - Total: 11,704
  - Density: 1,753.9/sq mi (677.2/km^{2})
- Time zone: UTC−7 (Mountain (MST))
  - Summer (DST): UTC−6 (MDT)
- ZIP code: 83318
- Area code: 208
- FIPS code: 16-11260
- GNIS feature ID: 2409944
- Website: burleyidaho.org

Burley (/ˈbʊrliː/) is a city in Cassia and Minidoka counties in southern Idaho, United States. The population was 11,704 at the 2020 census, up from 10,345 in 2010. The city is the county seat of Cassia County.

Burley is the principal city of the Burley, Idaho, Micropolitan Statistical Area, which comprises Cassia and Minidoka counties. Burley is the largest city in Cassia and Minidoka counties (collectively called the “Mini-Cassia” area), and the third-largest city in Idaho's Magic Valley region, after Twin Falls and Jerome.

== History ==
The first human inhabitants of the area were Paleo Indians, who first settled the area 15 to 16,000 years ago. Later, the Northern Shoshone and Northern Paiute peoples established communities in the area.

Oregon Trail passed through what is now Burley, and the California Trail passed just south, through the City of Rocks nearby. (The “parting of the ways” trail junction was at the convergence of the Raft and Snake rivers in eastern Cassia county.) The Oregon Short Line Railroad was constructed through what is now Burley, following the Oregon Trail, in the late 1800s.

A post office called Burley has been in operation since 1905. The community was named after David Ellsworth Burley, the local railroad agent. The town was incorporated in 1909, and became the seat of Cassia County in 1918.

In 1984, the Lower Goose Creek Reservoir (Oakley Reservoir) came very close to overtopping its dam after historic rain and snowfall. Burley was considered to be at risk of flooding if the reservoir was breached. To provide a safe water outlet, hundreds of local volunteers and the Army Corps of Engineers dug a 17-mile long, 70-foot wide diversion channel across private property in 4 days. The possible flood and diversion efforts were covered by the national news program, The MacNeil/Lehrer NewsHour (now PBS NewsHour) and The Washington Post.

A Simplot potato-processing plant in nearby Heyburn employed about 650 residents in the area and was a mainstay of the local economy, from its opening in 1960, through its closure in 2003. After the plant's closure, the city of Burley took ownership of the property. It currently operates an industrial park there. In the aftermath of the plant closure, voters in Burley, Rupert, and Heyburn approved bond issues to expand and upgrade wastewater infrastructure. This allowed other food processing companies to come to the area, which in turn stabilized and diversified the local economy.

In 2008, a group of local farmers sued the Idaho BLM (Bureau of Land Management) because pesticides that the Burley BLM office sprayed on their lands were carried by a wind storm onto farmers’ lands, effectively destroying crops.

== Economy ==
Agriculture and food processing play a critical role in the economy of Burley and the surrounding area. Burley is part of the broader Magic Valley region, known for its dairy and crop production. McCain Foods, a leading producer of frozen potato products, has a processing plant in Burley. The Amalgamated Sugar Company, which processes sugar beets, also runs a plant outside of nearby Paul, while Dot Foods operates a distribution plant in Burley. High Desert Milk, a Burley-based cooperative, is one of Idaho's leading dairy processors; in 2021, they underwent a $50 million expansion at their Burley facility. A local business, Suntado, built a new multimillion dollar shelf-stable milk factory in Burley around 2023.

Another major sector of Burley’s economy is banking. D. L. Evans Bank, a regional bank with $3.4 billion in assets and 39 locations across Idaho and northern Utah is headquartered in Burley. Key Bank, Zions Bank, US Bank, Idaho Central Credit Union, First Federal Savings Bank, and Wells Fargo all also operate branch offices in Burley.

The city owns and operates the Burley Municipal Airport. In recent years, there have been proposals to replace the airport with a new facility, as the existing airport faces funding and safety issues. However, plans to move the airport have faced some local opposition and challenges securing funding.

== Geography ==
Most of the city lies in Cassia County, with a small portion extending north into Minidoka County. The Snake River forms the border between the two counties. On the north side of the river, Burley is bordered to the east by the city of Heyburn.

U.S. Route 30 passes east-west through the center of Burley, leading northeast to Interstate 84 in Heyburn and west 33 miles (53 km) to Kimberly. Idaho State Highway 27 passes through the center of Burley, leading north 5 miles (8 km) to Paul and south 21 miles (34 km) to its terminus in Oakley, while State Highway 81 leads east from Burley 9 miles (14 km) to Declo. I-84 passes through the northern end of Burley, leading west 37 miles (60 km) to the Twin Falls area and southeast 145 miles (233 km) to Ogden, Utah. Replacements and upgrades to the I-84 interchanges outside of Burley and nearby Heyburn were completed 2026, replacing previous interchanges which had been in service since 1961.

According to the United States Census Bureau, Burley has a total area of 7.0 square miles (18 km^{2}), of which 6.7 square miles (17 km^{2}) are land and 0.3 square miles (0.8 km^{2}), or 4.71%, are water, referring to the Snake River.

=== Climate ===
Burley experiences a semi-arid climate (Köppen BSk) with cold winters and hot, dry summers. The hottest temperature recorded in Burley was 107 °F (42 °C) on July 30, 2000, while the coldest temperature recorded was −30 °F (−34 °C) on January 29, 1949 and January 22, 1962.

Burley's average monthly wind speeds vary from a high of 9.1 mph in February, to a low of 7.5 mph in August.

Climate data for Burley, Idaho (Burley Municipal Airport), 1991–2020 normals, extremes 1948–present
Month	Jan	Feb	Mar	Apr	May	Jun	Jul	Aug	Sep	Oct	Nov	Dec	Year
Record high °F (°C)	64 (18)	72 (22)	78 (26)	89 (32)	97 (36)	102 (39)	107 (42)	105 (41)	98 (37)	91 (33)	79 (26)	65 (18)	107 (42)
Mean maximum °F (°C)	51.7 (10.9)	57.2 (14.0)	70.2 (21.2)	78.9 (26.1)	86.7 (30.4)	93.6 (34.2)	99.4 (37.4)	97.9 (36.6)	91.8 (33.2)	81.4 (27.4)	66.3 (19.1)	53.6 (12.0)	100.3 (37.9)
Mean daily maximum °F (°C)	37.4 (3.0)	42.7 (5.9)	53.0 (11.7)	59.5 (15.3)	69.1 (20.6)	78.0 (25.6)	87.9 (31.1)	86.7 (30.4)	76.6 (24.8)	62.6 (17.0)	48.2 (9.0)	37.3 (2.9)	61.6 (16.4)
Daily mean °F (°C)	29.2 (−1.6)	33.3 (0.7)	41.4 (5.2)	47.1 (8.4)	55.8 (13.2)	63.4 (17.4)	71.5 (21.9)	69.9 (21.1)	60.8 (16.0)	49.1 (9.5)	37.6 (3.1)	29.2 (−1.6)	49.0 (9.4)
Mean daily minimum °F (°C)	21.0 (−6.1)	23.9 (−4.5)	29.9 (−1.2)	34.8 (1.6)	42.6 (5.9)	48.8 (9.3)	55.1 (12.8)	53.1 (11.7)	45.0 (7.2)	35.7 (2.1)	26.9 (−2.8)	21.0 (−6.1)	36.5 (2.5)
Mean minimum °F (°C)	2.1 (−16.6)	8.1 (−13.3)	17.6 (−8.0)	23.4 (−4.8)	30.6 (−0.8)	37.8 (3.2)	45.6 (7.6)	42.4 (5.8)	33.6 (0.9)	21.4 (−5.9)	10.5 (−11.9)	2.4 (−16.4)	−3.4 (−19.7)
Record low °F (°C)	−30 (−34)	−26 (−32)	−3 (−19)	12 (−11)	19 (−7)	29 (−2)	33 (1)	31 (−1)	18 (−8)	6 (−14)	−14 (−26)	−23 (−31)	−30 (−34)
Average precipitation inches (mm)	1.05 (27)	0.69 (18)	1.02 (26)	1.09 (28)	1.69 (43)	0.78 (20)	0.26 (6.6)	0.40 (10)	0.66 (17)	0.80 (20)	0.80 (20)	1.06 (27)	10.30 (262)
Average snowfall inches (cm)	6.2 (16)	4.3 (11)	1.7 (4.3)	0.8 (2.0)	0.0 (0.0)	0.0 (0.0)	0.0 (0.0)	0.0 (0.0)	0.0 (0.0)	0.3 (0.76)	3.0 (7.6)	6.7 (17)	23 (58.66)
Average precipitation days (≥ 0.01 in)	9.2	7.2	8.2	9.2	8.9	5.1	2.8	3.6	3.9	5.8	7.3	9.1	80.3
Average snowy days (≥ 0.1 in)	5.7	3.6	1.2	0.9	0.0	0.0	0.0	0.0	0.0	0.5	3.0	4.9	19.8
Source 1: National Weather Service
Source 2: NOAA (average snowfall/snowy days 1981–2010)

== Government and politics ==
The Burley City Council is composed of six individuals elected at-large. Each serves a four-year term. The current mayor is Steve Ormond, a retired bank manager and commercial loan officer.

Burley is the county seat of Cassia County. The Cassia County Courthouse, located in Burley, was added to the National Register of Historic Places on September 27, 1987.

== Demographics ==
Historical population
Census	Pop.	Note	%±
1920	5,408		—
1930	3,826		−29.3%
1940	5,329		39.3%
1950	5,924		11.2%
1960	7,508		26.7%
1970	8,279		10.3%
1980	8,761		5.8%
1990	8,702		−0.7%
2000	9,316		7.1%
2010	10,345		11.0%
2020	11,704		13.1%
U.S. Decennial Census

Over the last thirty years, Burley has grown steadily.

=== 2020 census ===
As of the 2020 census, Burley had a population of 11,704 and a population density of 1,754.7 inhabitants per square mile (677.5/km^{2}).

The median age was 31.6 years. 30.0% of residents were under the age of 18 and 14.4% were 65 years of age or older. For every 100 females there were 101.1 males, and for every 100 females age 18 and over there were 100.3 males age 18 and over.

99.4% of residents lived in urban areas, while 0.6% lived in rural areas.

There were 4,055 households in Burley, of which 39.4% had children under the age of 18 living in them. Of all households, 45.9% were married-couple households, 19.8% were households with a male householder and no spouse or partner present, and 26.5% were households with a female householder and no spouse or partner present. About 26.7% of all households were made up of individuals and 12.0% had someone living alone who was 65 years of age or older.

There were 4,293 housing units at an average density of 612.5 per square mile (236.5/km^{2}), of which 5.5% were vacant. The homeowner vacancy rate was 0.9% and the rental vacancy rate was 6.4%.

Racial composition as of the 2020 census
Race	Number	Percent
White	7,586	64.8%
Black or African American	44	0.4%
American Indian and Alaska Native	175	1.5%
Asian	84	0.7%
Native Hawaiian and Other Pacific Islander	13	0.1%
Some other race	2,588	22.1%
Two or more races	1,214	10.4%
Hispanic or Latino (of any race)	4,494	38.4%

=== 2021 American Community Survey ===
As of the 2021 annual American Community Survey, Burley's racial and ethnic makeup was 60.3% White, 33.8% Hispanic (any race), 0.9% Native American, 0.0% Black or African American, 0.4% Asian, and 4.0% two or more races.

=== 2010 census ===
As of the census of 2010, there were 10,345 people, 3,644 households, and 2,499 families living in the city. The population density was 1,690.4 inhabitants per square mile (652.7/km^{2}). There were 3,885 housing units at an average density of 634.8 per square mile (245.1/km^{2}). The racial makeup of the city was 77.2% White, 0.4% African American, 1.0% Native American, 0.7% Asian, 17.4% from other races, and 3.3% from two or more races. Hispanic or Latino of any race were 33.4% of the population.

There were 3,644 households, of which 40.1% had children under the age of 18 living with them, 49.7% were married couples living together, 13.0% had a female householder with no husband present, 5.9% had a male householder with no wife present, and 31.4% were non-families. 26.9% of all households were made up of individuals, and 12.8% had someone living alone who was 65 years of age or older. The average household size was 2.76 and the average family size was 3.37.

The median age in the city was 30.8 years. 31.8% of residents were under the age of 18; 9.7% were between the ages of 18 and 24; 24.9% were from 25 to 44; 20% were from 45 to 64; and 13.6% were 65 years of age or older. The gender makeup of the city was 49.6% male and 50.4% female.

According to city administration, the 2010 census count was low by about 2,000 people.

== Arts, culture, recreation, and tourism ==
Bicycles at Scholer Park, ahead of the Spudman Triathlon in Burley, July 2023

Burley is home to the famed "Spudman" Triathlon. The Spudman draws thousands of participants annually, and serves as a fundraiser for the local Lions Club.

Burley also hosts the Idaho Regatta. Founded in 1975, the regatta typically draws between 60 and 70 boat entrants.

The King Fine Arts Center, located at Burley High School, is a performing arts center with seating for 1,200 attendees, which regularly hosts plays, concerts, and community events. The Burley Theater, which was built in 1914, hosting vaudeville shows before switching to movies, was renovated in 2024.

The Cassia County Fairgrounds is located in Burley, where the Cassia County Fair and Rodeo are hosted annually.

The city of Burley operates 14 parks (including a skate park), an eighteen-hole golf course, a municipal swimming pool, and the library. It is located near the Pomerelle Ski Resort, the City of Rocks National Reserve, and hunting and fishing areas in the Sawtooth National Forest. The Oregon Trail Recreation District also operates a recreation center in Burley city limits. The center offers organized youth and adult sports including volleyball, futsal, softball, baseball, pickleball, football, tennis, and basketball.

== Education ==
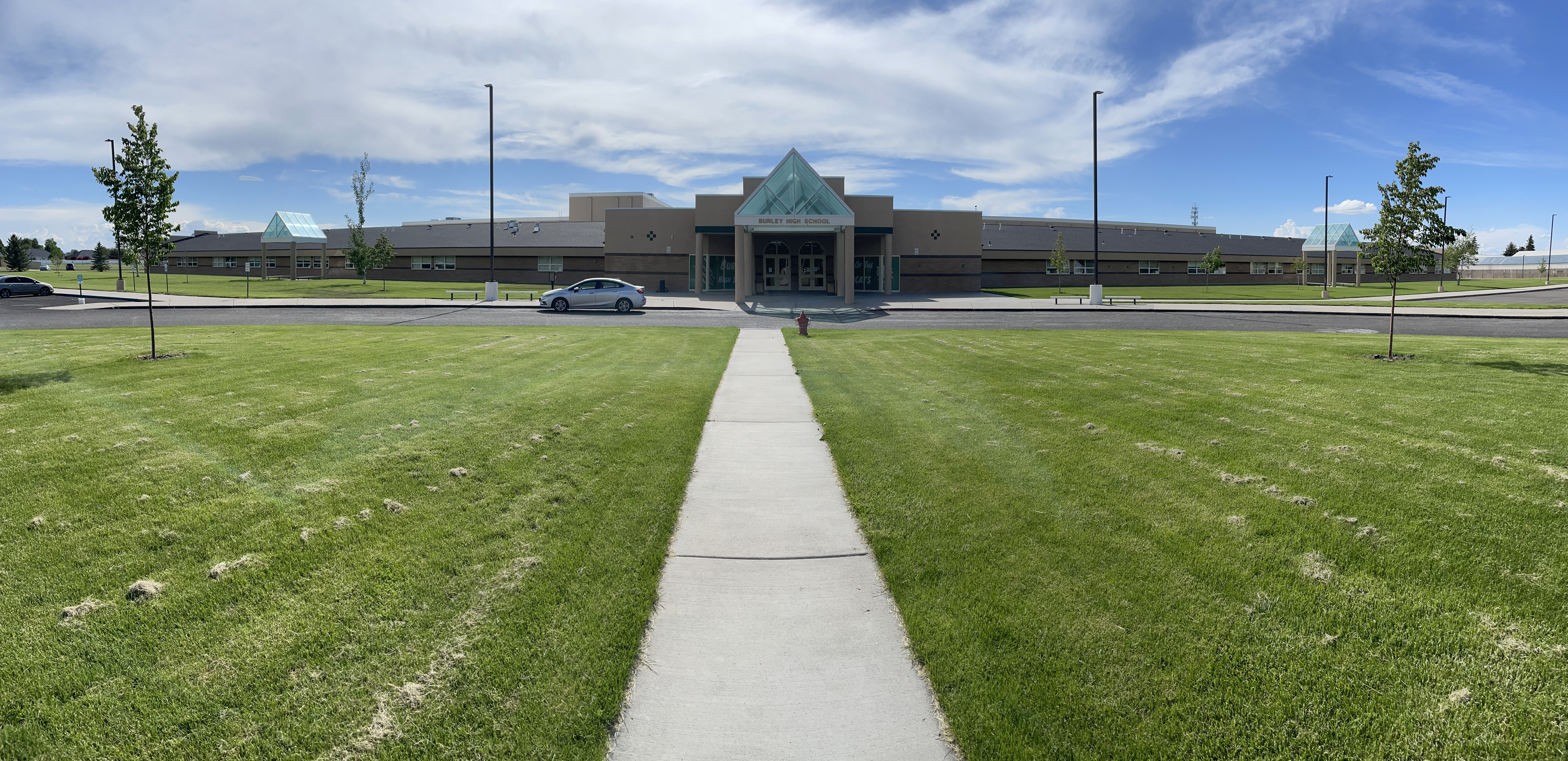
Panoramic view of Burley High School's facade.

The Cassia County portion of Burley is a part of the Cassia County School District. Facilities include Burley High School and junior high, and three elementary schools.

The Minidoka County portion of Burley is a part of the Minidoka County Schools. Residents of Minidoka County in Burley are zoned to Heyburn Elementary School, West Minico Middle School, and Minico High School.

The Burley Public Library completed a 1900 square foot expansion in 2026.

The College of Southern Idaho has both Cassia and Minidoka counties in its catchment area, though neither are in its taxation area. It operates the Mini-Cassia Center, a satellite campus in Burley, housed in Burley High School’s previous facility.

== Notable people ==
- Steve Antone, former Republican member of the Idaho House of Representatives
- Denton Darrington, former Republican member of the Idaho State Senate
- Henry Dworshak, former Republican member of the United States House of Representatives and the United States Senate
- John V. Evans, former D. L. Evans Bank president and Democratic Governor of Idaho
- Shaun Graham, visual effects animator for video games, television and film
- William Norman Grigg, journalist, magazine editor and constitutionalist author
- Clay Handy, member of Idaho State House of Representatives and local businessman
- Parley G. Hellewell, former Republican member of the Utah State Senate
- Bryant "Babe" Hiskey, retired PGA Tour professional golfer
- Kent Jensen, musician
- Pete Nielsen, former Republican member of the Idaho House of Representatives
- George W. Pace, author and former professor of religion at Brigham Young University
- Gary Peacock, jazz bassist best known for his work with Albert Ayler and in the Keith Jarrett Trio
- Barbara Jane Reams, actress
- Ron Romanick, former Major League Baseball pitcher (California Angels) and bullpen coach (Oakland Athletics)
- M. Phil Senini, actor, screenwriter and production assistant
- Mike Simpson, U.S. representative for Idaho
- Fred Wood, former Republican member of the Idaho House of Representatives
- Calvin E. Wright, former Democratic Idaho State Auditor (1939–45), Democratic nominee for Idaho Governor (1950)

== Gallery ==
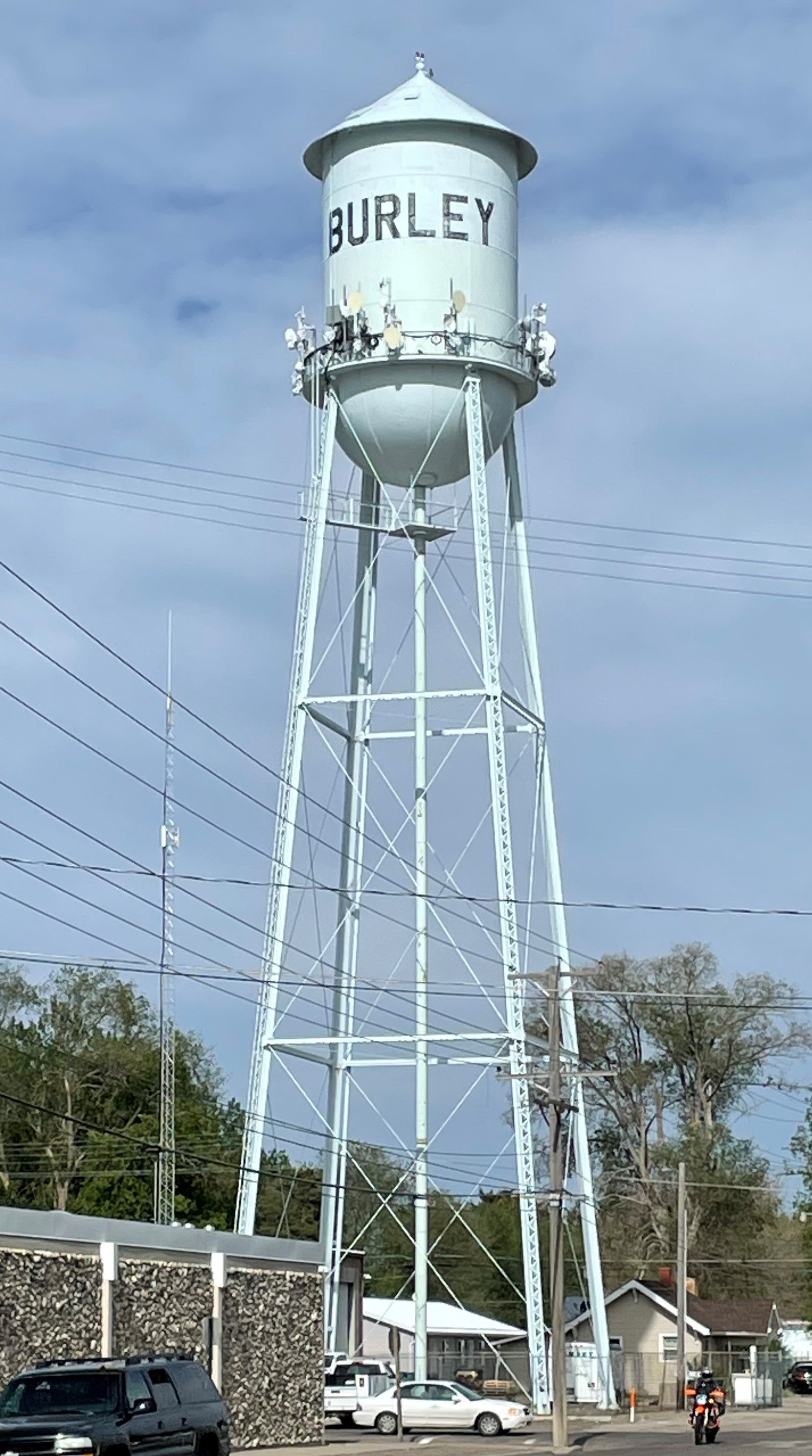
Burley's municipal water tower on 16th Street.

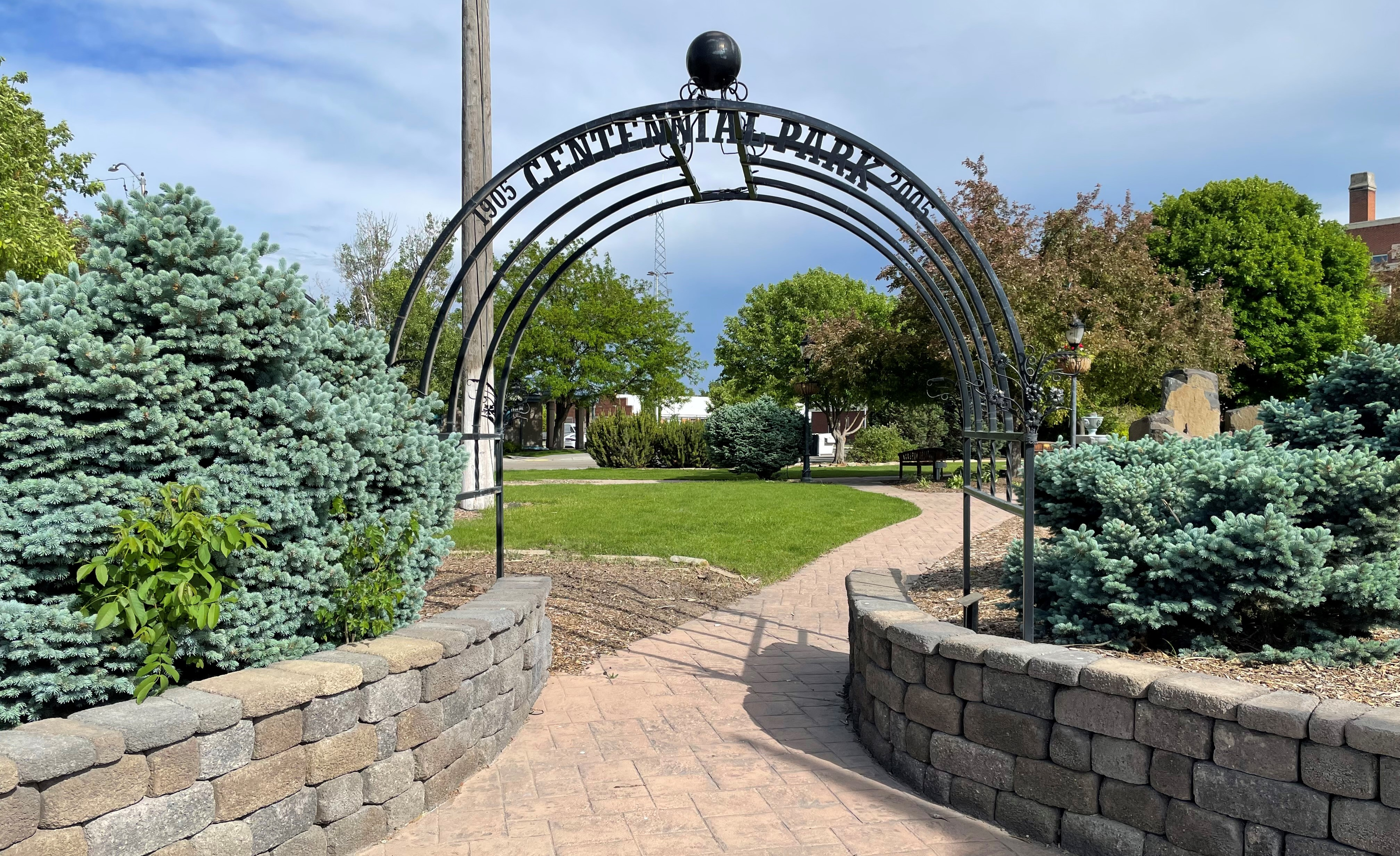
Entrance to Centennial Park, located near the courthouse and City Hall on Overland Avenue.

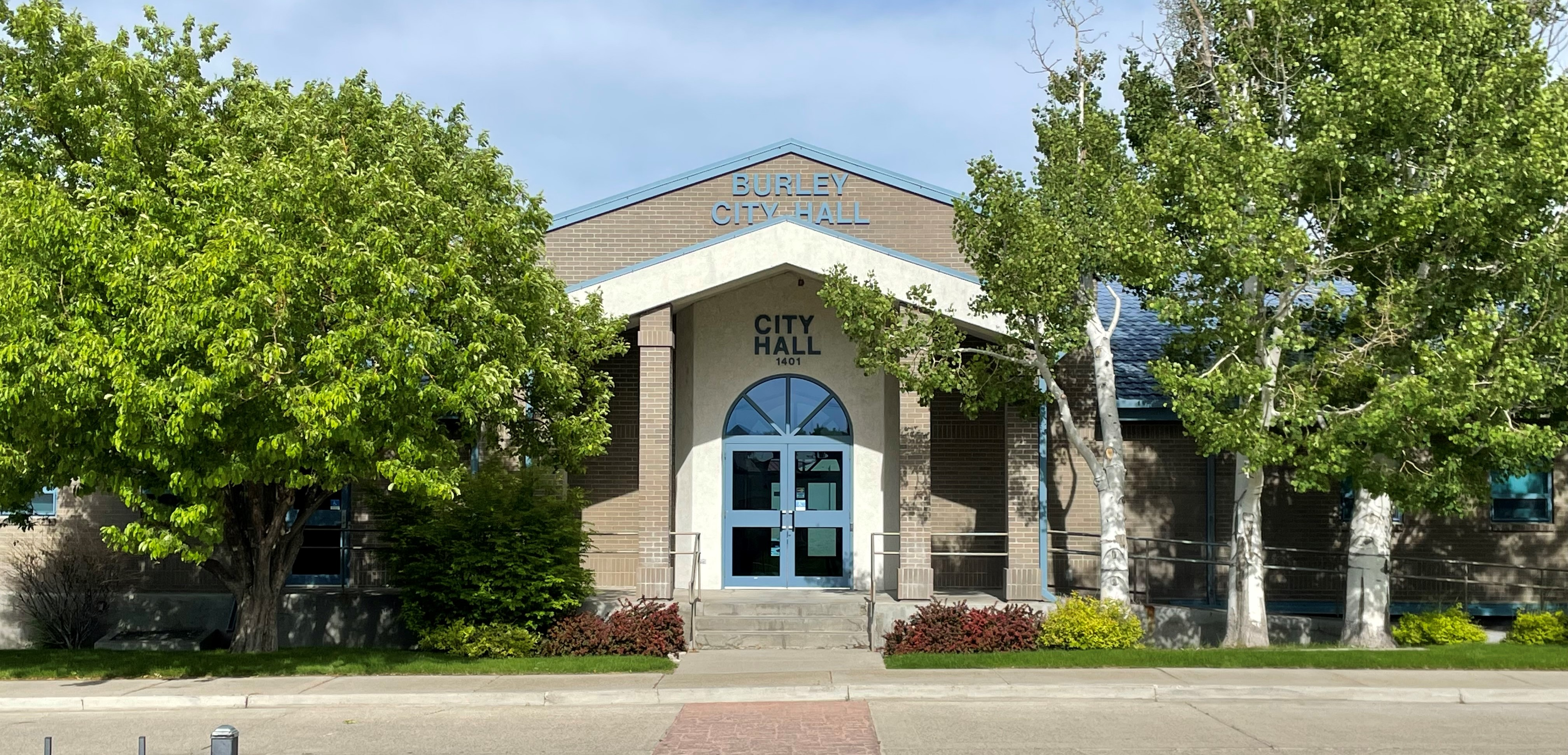
City Hall facade, as seen from Centennial Park.

Panoramic view of the Burley Municipal Airport.

High Desert Milk factory in Burley.

Grain elevator on US Route 30, on the west side of the city.

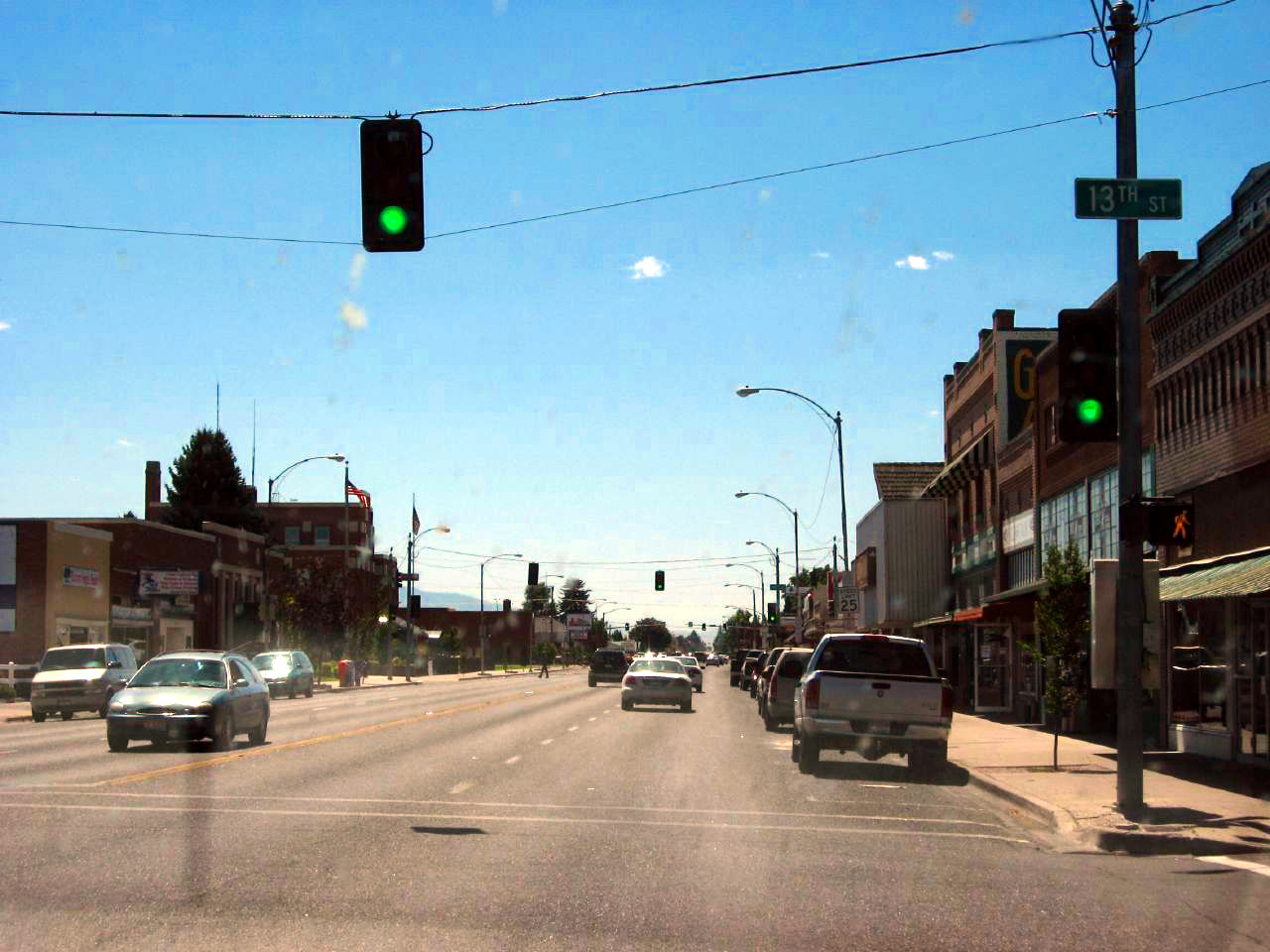
Looking to the south along Overland Avenue (SH 27) in Burley, August 2007

== See also ==
- List of cities in Idaho
- South Idaho Press
