= 1904 United States presidential election in Idaho =

- November 8, 1904
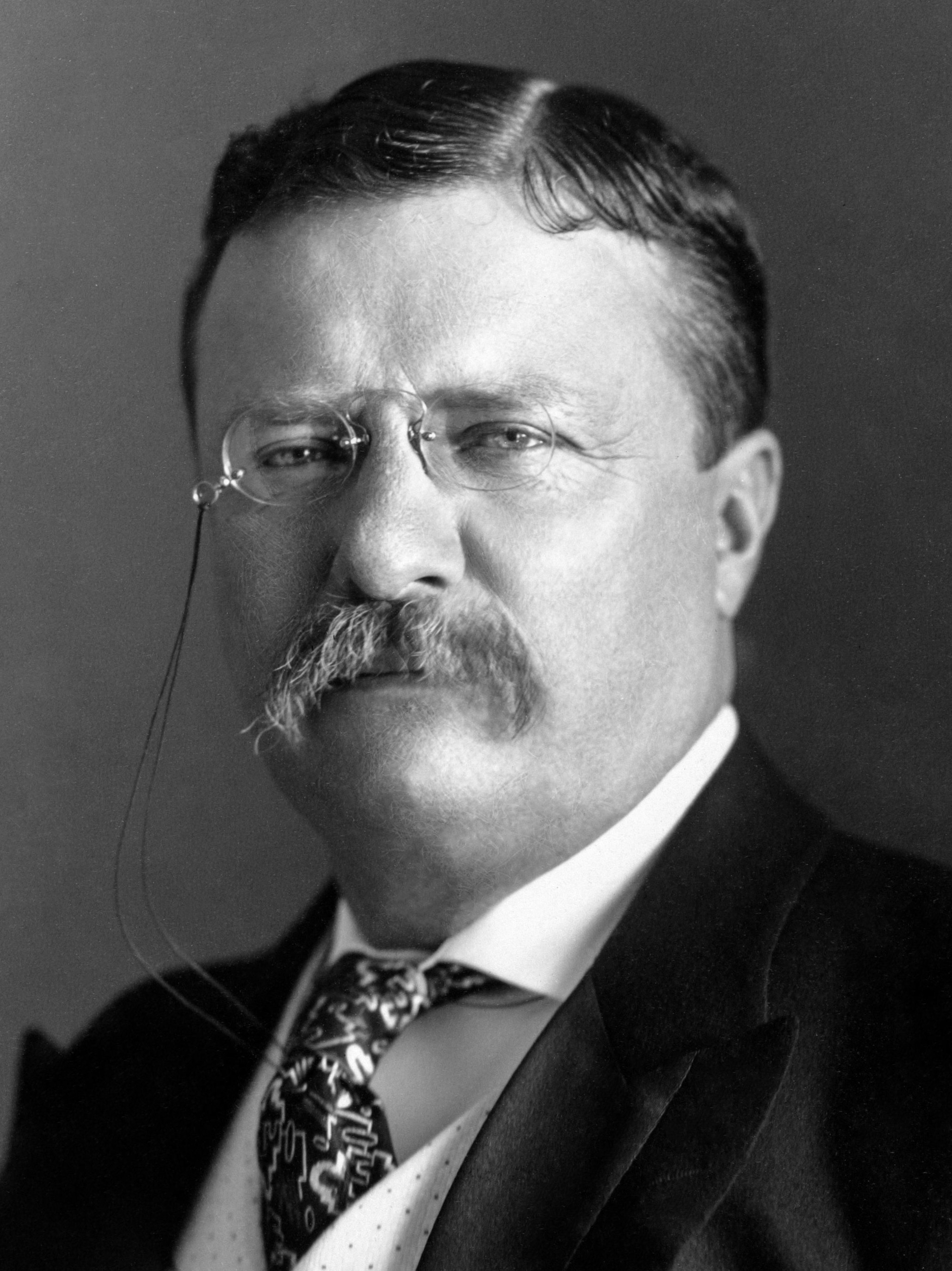

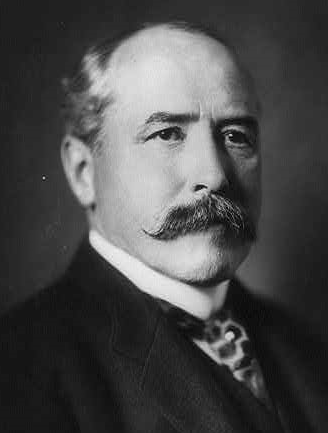

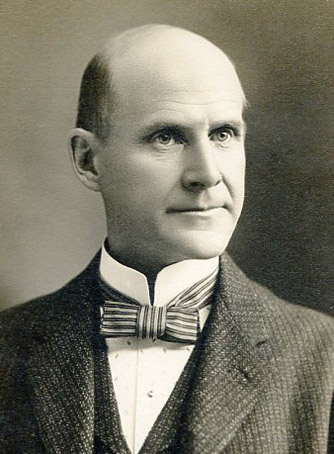
Nominee	Theodore Roosevelt	Alton B. Parker	Eugene V. Debs
Party	Republican	Democratic	Socialist
Home state	New York	New York	Indiana
Running mate	Charles W. Fairbanks	Henry G. Davis	Ben Hanford
Electoral vote	3	0	0
Popular vote	47,783	18,480	4,949
Percentage	65.84%	25.46%	6.82%
County results
Roosevelt
50–60%
60–70%
70–80%
President before election
Theodore Roosevelt
Republican
Elected President
Theodore Roosevelt
Republican

The 1904 United States presidential election in Idaho took place on November 8, 1904. All contemporary 45 states were part of the 1904 United States presidential election. State voters chose three electors to the Electoral College, which selected the president and vice president.

Although the Republican Party had not carried Idaho in any of the state's three previous presidential elections, at state level, Idaho had begun in 1902 to be very much a one-party Republican state, which it has largely remained since apart from the New Deal era of the 1930s and 1940s. Moreover, Democratic nominee Alton Brooks Parker’s defense of the Gold Standard, which harked back to Grover Cleveland, aroused no enthusiasm in Idaho. Nor did his opposition to Roosevelt’s policy of imperialism in the Pacific, whilst Roosevelt’s strong efforts to regulate big businesses were extremely popular in the remote Northwest. Parker was also affected by the perception that the Bryan Democrats had failed severely as a party of reform.

As a result, Roosevelt was able to achieve the first-ever Republican victory in Idaho by an overwhelming margin – 40.38 percentage points – in the process emulating William Jennings Bryan’s 1896 sweep of all Idaho’s counties.

== Results ==
1904 United States presidential election in Idaho
Party	Candidate	Votes	Percentage	Electoral votes
Republican	Theodore Roosevelt (incumbent)	47,783	65.84%	3
Democratic	Alton B. Parker	18,480	25.46%	0
Social Democratic	Eugene V. Debs	4,949	6.82%	0
Prohibition	Silas C. Swallow	1,013	1.40%	0
Populist	Thomas E. Watson	353	0.49%	0
Totals		72,578	100.00%	3
Voter turnout				—

=== Results by county ===
County	Theodore Roosevelt Republican		Alton Brooks Parker Democratic		Eugene Victor Debs Socialist		Silas Comfort Swallow Prohibition		Thomas Edward Watson Populist		Margin		Total votes cast
County	#	%	#	%	#	%	#	%	#	%	#	%	Total votes cast
Ada	4,536	69.52%	1,466	22.47%	318	4.87%	164	2.51%	41	0.63%	3,070	47.05%	6,525
Bannock	2,826	68.58%	1,063	25.79%	227	5.51%	3	0.07%	2	0.05%	1,763	42.78%	4,121
Bear Lake	1,538	66.26%	769	33.13%	11	0.47%	3	0.13%	0	0.00%	769	33.13%	2,321
Bingham	3,186	71.18%	890	19.88%	365	8.15%	22	0.49%	13	0.29%	2,296	51.30%	4,476
Blaine	1,225	56.37%	775	35.66%	140	6.44%	11	0.51%	22	1.01%	450	20.71%	2,173
Boise	1,053	56.31%	639	34.17%	125	6.68%	35	1.87%	18	0.96%	414	22.14%	1,870
Canyon	3,172	66.55%	1,025	21.51%	316	6.63%	190	3.99%	63	1.32%	2,147	45.05%	4,766
Cassia	1,105	72.51%	346	22.70%	59	3.87%	5	0.33%	9	0.59%	759	49.80%	1,524
Custer	496	51.29%	429	44.36%	33	3.41%	6	0.62%	3	0.31%	67	6.93%	967
Elmore	593	53.09%	433	38.76%	68	6.09%	17	1.52%	6	0.54%	160	14.32%	1,117
Fremont	3,869	70.56%	1,278	23.31%	313	5.71%	11	0.20%	12	0.22%	2,591	47.26%	5,483
Idaho	2,731	61.12%	1,381	30.91%	304	6.80%	33	0.74%	19	0.43%	1,350	30.21%	4,468
Kootenai	4,165	67.55%	1,178	19.10%	664	10.77%	132	2.14%	27	0.44%	2,987	48.44%	6,166
Latah	3,276	70.19%	940	20.14%	283	6.06%	138	2.96%	30	0.64%	2,336	50.05%	4,667
Lemhi	786	55.43%	564	39.77%	28	1.97%	6	0.42%	34	2.40%	222	15.66%	1,418
Lincoln	688	68.19%	262	25.97%	50	4.96%	9	0.89%	0	0.00%	426	42.22%	1,009
Nez Perce	3,956	62.98%	1,696	27.00%	448	7.13%	160	2.55%	21	0.33%	2,260	35.98%	6,281
Oneida	2,339	70.45%	906	27.29%	75	2.26%	0	0.00%	0	0.00%	1,433	43.16%	3,320
Owyhee	663	54.98%	393	32.59%	118	9.78%	9	0.75%	23	1.91%	270	22.39%	1,206
Shoshone	3,695	66.12%	1,116	19.97%	748	13.39%	23	0.41%	6	0.11%	2,579	46.15%	5,588
Washington	1,894	60.71%	931	29.84%	256	8.21%	36	1.15%	3	0.10%	963	30.87%	3,120
Totals	47,792	65.84%	18,480	25.46%	4,949	6.82%	1,013	1.40%	352	0.48%	29,312	40.38%	72,586

== See also ==
- United States presidential elections in Idaho
