= 1952 United States presidential election in Idaho =

- November 4, 1952

Nominee	Dwight D. Eisenhower	Adlai Stevenson
Party	Republican	Democratic
Home state	New York	Illinois
Running mate	Richard Nixon	John Sparkman
Electoral vote	4	0
Popular vote	180,707	95,081
Percentage	65.42%	34.42%
County results
Eisenhower
50–60%
60–70%
70–80%
Stevenson
50–60%
President before election
Harry S. Truman
Democratic
Elected President
Dwight D. Eisenhower
Republican

The 1952 United States presidential election in Idaho took place on November 4, 1952, as part of the 1952 United States presidential election. State voters chose four representatives, or electors, to the Electoral College, who voted for president and vice president.

Idaho was won by Columbia University President Dwight D. Eisenhower (R–New York), running with Senator Richard Nixon, with 65.42 percent of the popular vote, against Adlai Stevenson (D–Illinois), running with Senator John Sparkman, with 34.42 percent of the popular vote.

Eisenhower became the first Republican since Herbert Hoover in 1928 to win Idaho in a presidential election.

== Results ==
1952 United States presidential election in Idaho
Party	Candidate	Votes	%
Republican	Dwight D. Eisenhower	180,707	65.42%
Democratic	Adlai Stevenson	95,081	34.42%
Progressive	Vincent Hallinan	443	0.16%
Total votes		276,231	100.00%

=== Results by county ===
County	Dwight D. Eisenhower Republican		Adlai Stevenson Democratic		Vincent Hallinan Progressive		Margin		Total votes cast
County	#	%	#	%	#	%	#	%	Total votes cast
Ada	27,415	72.65%	10,281	27.24%	40	0.11%	17,134	45.41%	37,736
Adams	933	64.26%	517	35.61%	2	0.14%	416	28.65%	1,452
Bannock	10,864	55.25%	8,771	44.61%	27	0.14%	2,093	10.64%	19,662
Bear Lake	2,300	64.35%	1,274	35.65%	0	0.00%	1,026	28.70%	3,574
Benewah	1,568	52.08%	1,436	47.69%	7	0.23%	132	4.39%	3,011
Bingham	6,114	66.87%	3,024	33.07%	5	0.05%	3,090	33.80%	9,143
Blaine	1,609	60.90%	1,033	39.10%	0	0.00%	576	21.80%	2,642
Boise	655	67.53%	309	31.86%	6	0.62%	346	35.67%	970
Bonner	4,309	56.36%	3,293	43.07%	43	0.56%	1,016	13.29%	7,645
Bonneville	10,252	68.38%	4,737	31.59%	4	0.03%	5,515	36.79%	14,993
Boundary	1,641	60.98%	1,040	38.65%	10	0.37%	601	22.33%	2,691
Butte	916	65.95%	473	34.05%	0	0.00%	443	31.90%	1,389
Camas	425	65.38%	224	34.46%	1	0.15%	201	30.92%	650
Canyon	17,065	71.28%	6,810	28.44%	67	0.28%	10,255	42.84%	23,942
Caribou	1,788	68.82%	809	31.14%	1	0.04%	979	37.68%	2,598
Cassia	4,481	72.76%	1,676	27.21%	2	0.03%	2,805	45.55%	6,159
Clark	382	75.20%	126	24.80%	0	0.00%	256	50.40%	508
Clearwater	1,494	44.91%	1,826	54.88%	7	0.21%	-332	-9.97%	3,327
Custer	1,058	69.74%	452	29.80%	7	0.46%	606	39.94%	1,517
Elmore	1,653	52.59%	1,484	47.22%	6	0.19%	169	5.37%	3,143
Franklin	3,252	73.31%	1,181	26.62%	3	0.07%	2,071	46.69%	4,436
Fremont	2,710	64.32%	1,500	35.60%	3	0.07%	1,210	28.72%	4,213
Gem	2,568	62.21%	1,555	37.67%	5	0.12%	1,013	24.54%	4,128
Gooding	3,452	71.03%	1,404	28.89%	4	0.08%	2,048	42.14%	4,860
Idaho	3,054	57.30%	2,269	42.57%	7	0.13%	785	14.73%	5,330
Jefferson	2,970	66.80%	1,474	33.15%	2	0.04%	1,496	33.65%	4,446
Jerome	3,807	74.21%	1,318	25.69%	5	0.10%	2,489	48.52%	5,130
Kootenai	7,272	56.93%	5,414	42.38%	88	0.69%	1,858	14.55%	12,774
Latah	5,440	62.51%	3,254	37.39%	8	0.09%	2,186	25.12%	8,702
Lemhi	2,100	71.19%	848	28.75%	2	0.07%	1,252	42.44%	2,950
Lewis	1,004	44.04%	1,276	55.96%	0	0.00%	-272	-11.92%	2,280
Lincoln	1,383	71.11%	562	28.89%	0	0.00%	821	42.22%	1,945
Madison	2,756	67.12%	1,348	32.83%	2	0.05%	1,408	34.29%	4,106
Minidoka	3,128	71.40%	1,253	28.60%	0	0.00%	1,875	42.80%	4,381
Nez Perce	5,659	50.39%	5,552	49.43%	20	0.18%	107	0.96%	11,231
Oneida	1,547	67.64%	739	32.31%	1	0.04%	808	35.33%	2,287
Owyhee	1,813	70.41%	759	29.48%	3	0.12%	1,054	40.93%	2,575
Payette	3,936	72.37%	1,491	27.41%	12	0.22%	2,445	44.96%	5,439
Power	1,308	68.45%	603	31.55%	0	0.00%	705	36.90%	1,911
Shoshone	5,119	51.91%	4,684	47.50%	59	0.60%	435	4.41%	9,862
Teton	964	66.25%	491	33.75%	0	0.00%	473	32.50%	1,455
Twin Falls	14,471	76.07%	4,548	23.91%	4	0.02%	9,923	52.16%	19,023
Valley	1,456	72.51%	552	27.49%	0	0.00%	904	45.02%	2,008
Washington	2,616	64.91%	1,411	35.01%	3	0.07%	1,205	29.90%	4,030
Totals	180,707	65.41%	95,081	34.42%	466	0.17%	85,626	30.99%	276,254

==== Counties that flipped from Democratic to Republican ====
- Adams
- Bannock
- Bear Lake
- Benewah
- Bingham
- Blaine
- Boise
- Bonner
- Bonneville
- Boundary
- Butte
- Caribou
- Custer
- Elmore
- Fremont
- Gem
- Idaho
- Jefferson
- Kootenai
- Latah
- Madison
- Minidoka
- Nez Perce
- Oneida
- Teton
- Shoshone

== See also ==
- United States presidential elections in Idaho
