= 1960 United States presidential election in Idaho =

- November 8, 1960

Nominee	Richard Nixon	John F. Kennedy
Party	Republican	Democratic
Home state	California	Massachusetts
Running mate	Henry Cabot Lodge Jr.	Lyndon B. Johnson
Electoral vote	4	0
Popular vote	161,597	138,853
Percentage	53.78%	46.22%
County results
Nixon
50–60%
60–70%
Kennedy
50–60%
60–70%
President before election
Dwight D. Eisenhower
Republican
Elected President
John F. Kennedy
Democratic

The 1960 United States presidential election in Idaho took place on November 8, 1960, as part of the 1960 United States presidential election. State voters chose four representatives, or electors, to the Electoral College, who voted for president and vice president.

Idaho was won by incumbent Vice President Richard Nixon (R–California), running with United States Ambassador to the United Nations Henry Cabot Lodge Jr., with 53.78 percent of the popular vote, against Senator John F. Kennedy (D–Massachusetts), running with Senator Lyndon B. Johnson, with 46.22 percent of the popular vote. As of the 2024 presidential election, this is the last election in which Custer County and Camas County voted for a Democratic presidential candidate.

Nixon won Idaho by 22,744 votes, or 7.6%, which was significantly less than fellow Republican Dwight D. Eisenhower in 1956, who won the state by a margin of 22.4%, or 61,111 votes. This marked the first time since its admission to the union in 1890 that Idaho would back a losing Republican in a presidential election. This was also the first time since 1900 that the state failed to back the winning candidate in a presidential election. Four years later, Democrat Lyndon B. Johnson would win the state by a margin of 1.83%, or 5,363 votes, which as of the 2024 presidential election, is the last time a Democratic presidential candidate has carried the state, or even broken 40% of the total vote. As of the 2024 presidential election, 1960 is the last time a Democratic presidential candidate has lost Idaho by a single-digit margin.

== Results ==
1960 United States presidential election in Idaho
Party	Candidate	Votes	%
Republican	Richard Nixon	161,597	53.78%
Democratic	John F. Kennedy	138,853	46.22%
Total votes		300,450	100.00%

=== Results by county ===
County	Richard Nixon Republican		John F. Kennedy Democratic		Margin		Total votes cast
County	#	%	#	%	#	%	Total votes cast
Ada	27,703	61.95%	17,017	38.05%	10,686	23.90%	44,720
Adams	799	52.46%	724	47.54%	75	4.92%	1,523
Bannock	9,157	42.11%	12,586	57.89%	-3,429	-15.78%	21,743
Bear Lake	1,963	55.67%	1,563	44.33%	400	11.34%	3,526
Benewah	1,274	42.05%	1,756	57.95%	-482	-15.90%	3,030
Bingham	5,934	55.06%	4,843	44.94%	1,091	10.12%	10,777
Blaine	1,216	49.27%	1,252	50.73%	-36	-1.46%	2,468
Boise	456	51.35%	432	48.65%	24	2.70%	888
Bonner	3,575	46.80%	4,064	53.20%	-489	-6.40%	7,639
Bonneville	11,111	55.68%	8,845	44.32%	2,266	11.36%	19,956
Boundary	1,237	45.18%	1,501	54.82%	-264	-9.64%	2,738
Butte	680	40.45%	1,001	59.55%	-321	-19.10%	1,681
Camas	284	46.86%	322	53.14%	-38	-6.28%	606
Canyon	15,865	62.10%	9,681	37.90%	6,184	24.20%	25,546
Caribou	1,544	54.42%	1,293	45.58%	251	8.84%	2,837
Cassia	4,297	63.73%	2,445	36.27%	1,852	27.46%	6,742
Clark	283	61.66%	176	38.34%	107	23.32%	459
Clearwater	1,193	33.14%	2,407	66.86%	-1,214	-33.72%	3,600
Custer	651	43.72%	838	56.28%	-187	-12.56%	1,489
Elmore	2,226	47.71%	2,440	52.29%	-214	-4.58%	4,666
Franklin	2,633	66.07%	1,352	33.93%	1,281	32.14%	3,985
Fremont	2,230	54.17%	1,887	45.83%	343	8.34%	4,117
Gem	2,428	55.13%	1,976	44.87%	452	10.26%	4,404
Gooding	2,523	55.72%	2,005	44.28%	518	11.44%	4,528
Idaho	2,248	40.84%	3,256	59.16%	-1,008	-18.32%	5,504
Jefferson	2,625	52.51%	2,374	47.49%	251	5.02%	4,999
Jerome	3,031	58.49%	2,151	41.51%	880	16.98%	5,182
Kootenai	6,704	46.40%	7,744	53.60%	-1,040	-7.20%	14,448
Latah	4,789	50.81%	4,636	49.19%	153	1.62%	9,425
Lemhi	1,355	51.36%	1,283	48.64%	72	2.72%	2,638
Lewis	781	35.29%	1,432	64.71%	-651	-29.42%	2,213
Lincoln	970	55.33%	783	44.67%	187	10.66%	1,753
Madison	2,374	58.59%	1,678	41.41%	696	17.18%	4,052
Minidoka	3,360	57.66%	2,467	42.34%	893	15.32%	5,827
Nez Perce	5,203	39.58%	7,944	60.42%	-2,741	-20.84%	13,147
Oneida	1,111	58.17%	799	41.83%	312	16.34%	1,910
Owyhee	1,500	57.06%	1,129	42.94%	371	14.12%	2,629
Payette	3,472	61.94%	2,133	38.06%	1,339	23.88%	5,605
Power	1,065	52.59%	960	47.41%	105	5.18%	2,025
Shoshone	3,432	40.70%	5,001	59.30%	-1,569	-18.60%	8,433
Teton	714	55.65%	569	44.35%	145	11.30%	1,283
Twin Falls	12,171	62.15%	7,413	37.85%	4,758	24.30%	19,584
Valley	1,179	56.28%	916	43.72%	263	12.56%	2,095
Washington	2,251	55.86%	1,779	44.14%	472	11.72%	4,030
Totals	161,597	53.78%	138,853	46.22%	22,744	7.56%	300,450

==== Counties that flipped from Republican to Democratic ====
- Bannock
- Benewah
- Blaine
- Bonner
- Boundary
- Butte
- Camas
- Custer
- Elmore
- Idaho
- Kootenai
- Shoshone

== See also ==
- United States presidential elections in Idaho
