= 1976 United States presidential election in Idaho =

- November 2, 1976

Nominee	Gerald Ford	Jimmy Carter
Party	Republican	Democratic
Home state	Michigan	Georgia
Running mate	Bob Dole	Walter Mondale
Electoral vote	4	0
Popular vote	204,151	126,549
Percentage	59.88%	37.12%
County results
Ford
40–50%
50–60%
60–70%
70–80%
Carter
40–50%
50–60%
President before election
Gerald Ford
Republican
Elected President
Jimmy Carter
Democratic

The 1976 United States presidential election in Idaho took place on November 2, 1976, as part of the 1976 United States presidential election. State voters chose four representatives, or electors, to the Electoral College, who voted for president and vice president.

Idaho was won by incumbent President Gerald Ford (R–Michigan), with 59.9 percent of the popular vote, against Jimmy Carter (D–Georgia), with 37.1 percent of the popular vote. Two third party candidates accumulated a portion of the vote greater than one percent: Lester Maddox (AIA–Georgia) and Roger MacBride (L–Vermont). Despite losing in Idaho, Carter went on to win the national election and became the 39th president of the United States. Idaho had previously voted Republican ten times, Democrat ten times, and Populist once.

With 59.88 percent of the popular vote, Idaho would prove to be Ford's second strongest state in the 1976 election after neighboring Utah. Carter became the first ever Democrat to win the White House without carrying Blaine, Boundary, or Butte Counties, as well as the first to do so without carrying Elmore, Idaho, Kootenai, or Shoshone Counties since Grover Cleveland in 1892, and the first to do so without carrying Bannock or Bonner Counties since Woodrow Wilson in 1912.

Despite this, this would prove to be the high water mark for Democrats since Lyndon Johnson last carried the state in 1964: as of 2024, no Democrats have met Carter's 37.12%, the closest being Barack Obama's 36.09% in 2008.

== Results ==
1976 United States presidential election in Idaho
Party	Candidate	Votes	%
Republican	Gerald Ford (inc.)	204,151	59.88%
Democratic	Jimmy Carter	126,549	37.12%
American Independent	Lester Maddox	5,935	1.74%
Libertarian	Roger MacBride	3,558	1.04%
U.S. Labor	Lyndon LaRouche	739	0.22%
Total votes		340,932	100.00%

=== Results by county ===
County	Gerald Ford Republican		Jimmy Carter Democratic		Lester Maddox American Independent		Roger MacBride Libertarian		Lyndon LaRouche U.S. Labor		Margin		Total votes cast
County	#	%	#	%	#	%	#	%	#	%	#	%	Total votes cast
Ada	41,135	64.39%	21,125	33.07%	717	1.12%	737	1.15%	175	0.27%	20,010	31.32%	63,889
Adams	809	54.74%	639	43.23%	15	1.01%	10	0.68%	5	0.34%	170	11.51%	1,478
Bannock	13,172	53.65%	10,261	41.80%	485	1.98%	577	2.35%	55	0.22%	2,911	11.85%	24,550
Bear Lake	2,094	66.60%	960	30.53%	74	2.35%	15	0.48%	1	0.03%	1,134	36.07%	3,144
Benewah	1,458	47.58%	1,549	50.55%	37	1.21%	16	0.52%	4	0.13%	-91	-2.97%	3,064
Bingham	7,327	60.83%	4,347	36.09%	219	1.82%	119	0.99%	33	0.27%	2,980	24.74%	12,045
Blaine	2,176	56.13%	1,604	41.37%	25	0.64%	69	1.78%	3	0.08%	572	14.76%	3,877
Boise	684	58.61%	433	37.10%	22	1.89%	24	2.06%	4	0.34%	251	21.51%	1,167
Bonner	4,549	51.37%	4,065	45.91%	161	1.82%	60	0.68%	20	0.23%	484	5.46%	8,855
Bonneville	15,793	66.44%	7,230	30.41%	414	1.74%	275	1.16%	60	0.25%	8,563	36.03%	23,772
Boundary	1,458	52.15%	1,217	43.53%	92	3.29%	24	0.86%	5	0.18%	241	8.62%	2,796
Butte	751	51.16%	663	45.16%	35	2.38%	19	1.29%	0	0.00%	88	6.00%	1,468
Camas	288	62.20%	160	34.56%	8	1.73%	6	1.30%	1	0.22%	128	27.64%	463
Canyon	17,263	62.91%	9,460	34.47%	405	1.48%	277	1.01%	36	0.13%	7,803	28.44%	27,441
Caribou	2,253	64.83%	1,110	31.94%	83	2.39%	24	0.69%	5	0.14%	1,143	32.89%	3,475
Cassia	4,575	66.38%	1,881	27.29%	368	5.34%	64	0.93%	4	0.06%	2,694	39.09%	6,892
Clark	334	64.48%	169	32.63%	7	1.35%	6	1.16%	2	0.39%	165	31.85%	518
Clearwater	1,469	44.01%	1,752	52.49%	71	2.13%	33	0.99%	13	0.39%	-283	-8.48%	3,338
Custer	850	60.33%	516	36.62%	40	2.84%	2	0.14%	1	0.07%	334	23.71%	1,409
Elmore	2,808	55.46%	2,164	42.74%	61	1.20%	26	0.51%	4	0.08%	644	12.72%	5,063
Franklin	2,720	67.80%	1,157	28.84%	104	2.59%	24	0.60%	7	0.17%	1,563	38.96%	4,012
Fremont	2,581	61.94%	1,445	34.68%	115	2.76%	21	0.50%	5	0.12%	1,136	27.26%	4,167
Gem	2,401	52.75%	1,978	43.45%	118	2.59%	52	1.14%	3	0.07%	423	9.30%	4,552
Gooding	2,909	58.54%	1,923	38.70%	74	1.49%	59	1.19%	4	0.08%	986	19.84%	4,969
Idaho	3,185	55.96%	2,323	40.81%	122	2.14%	54	0.95%	8	0.14%	862	15.15%	5,692
Jefferson	3,599	65.14%	1,745	31.58%	157	2.84%	21	0.38%	3	0.05%	1,854	33.56%	5,525
Jerome	3,188	61.81%	1,800	34.90%	113	2.19%	52	1.01%	5	0.10%	1,388	26.91%	5,158
Kootenai	10,493	57.78%	7,225	39.79%	306	1.69%	92	0.51%	43	0.24%	3,268	17.99%	18,159
Latah	6,846	54.90%	5,314	42.61%	96	0.77%	174	1.40%	40	0.32%	1,532	12.29%	12,470
Lemhi	1,685	56.37%	1,159	38.78%	117	3.91%	25	0.84%	3	0.10%	526	17.59%	2,989
Lewis	824	46.61%	898	50.79%	21	1.19%	18	1.02%	7	0.40%	-74	-4.18%	1,768
Lincoln	909	57.75%	615	39.07%	36	2.29%	13	0.83%	1	0.06%	294	18.68%	1,574
Madison	4,190	72.38%	1,320	22.80%	153	2.64%	58	1.00%	68	1.17%	2,870	49.58%	5,789
Minidoka	3,600	56.44%	2,441	38.27%	252	3.95%	80	1.25%	5	0.08%	1,159	18.17%	6,378
Nez Perce	6,151	48.22%	6,324	49.58%	126	0.99%	110	0.86%	44	0.34%	-173	-1.36%	12,755
Oneida	1,065	61.14%	637	36.57%	31	1.78%	7	0.40%	2	0.11%	428	24.57%	1,742
Owyhee	1,519	57.52%	1,054	39.91%	41	1.55%	21	0.80%	6	0.23%	465	17.61%	2,641
Payette	3,115	57.44%	2,195	40.48%	75	1.38%	35	0.65%	3	0.06%	920	16.96%	5,423
Power	1,374	49.96%	1,286	46.76%	52	1.89%	38	1.38%	0	0.00%	88	3.20%	2,750
Shoshone	3,570	51.67%	3,216	46.55%	77	1.11%	39	0.56%	7	0.10%	354	5.12%	6,909
Teton	904	63.04%	514	35.84%	12	0.84%	3	0.21%	1	0.07%	390	27.20%	1,434
Twin Falls	12,659	65.82%	6,085	31.64%	310	1.61%	145	0.75%	34	0.18%	6,574	34.18%	19,233
Valley	1,374	59.33%	897	38.73%	22	0.95%	20	0.86%	3	0.13%	477	20.60%	2,316
Washington	2,044	53.47%	1,693	44.28%	66	1.73%	14	0.37%	6	0.16%	351	9.19%	3,823
Totals	204,151	59.88%	126,549	37.12%	5,935	1.74%	3,558	1.04%	739	0.22%	77,602	22.76%	340,932

==== Counties that flipped from Republican to Democratic ====
- Benewah
- Clearwater
- Lewis
- Nez Perce

=== By Congressional District ===
Ford won both congressional districts.

District	Ford	Carter	Representative
1st	59.8%	40.2%	Steve Symms
2nd	63.8%	36.2%	George V. Hansen

== See also ==
- United States presidential elections in Idaho
