= 1932 United States presidential election in Idaho =

- November 8, 1932

Nominee	Franklin D. Roosevelt	Herbert Hoover
Party	Democratic	Republican
Home state	New York	California
Running mate	John Nance Garner	Charles Curtis
Electoral vote	4	0
Popular vote	109,479	71,417
Percentage	58.66%	38.27%
County results
Roosevelt
50–60%
60–70%
70–80%
Hoover
50–60%
President before election
Herbert Hoover
Republican
Elected President
Franklin D. Roosevelt
Democratic

The 1932 United States presidential election in Idaho took place on November 8, 1932, as part of the 1932 United States presidential election. State voters chose four representatives, or electors, to the Electoral College, who voted for president and vice president.

Idaho was won by Governor Franklin D. Roosevelt (D–New York), running with Speaker John Nance Garner, with 58.66 percent of the popular vote, against incumbent President Herbert Hoover (R–California), running with Vice President Charles Curtis, with 38.27 percent of the popular vote. This is the only occasion when Clark County has voted for a Democratic presidential candidate. (Note: It is practically certain, however, that the area Clark County occupies voted Democratic for William Jennings Bryan in 1896 as Fremont County – which then covered the area Clark County now occupies – voted 1,526 to 121 for Bryan against William McKinley in that election.)

== Results ==
1932 United States presidential election in Idaho
Party	Candidate	Votes	%
Democratic	Franklin D. Roosevelt	109,479	58.66%
Republican	Herbert Hoover (inc.)	71,417	38.27%
Liberty	William Hope Harvey	4,712	2.52%
Socialist	Norman Thomas	526	0.28%
Communist	William Z. Foster	491	0.26%
Total votes		186,625	100%

=== Results by county ===
County	Franklin Delano Roosevelt Democratic		Herbert Clark Hoover Republican		William Hope Harvey Liberty		Norman Mattoon Thomas Socialist		William Z. Foster Communist		Margin		Total votes cast
County	#	%	#	%	#	%	#	%	#	%	#	%	Total votes cast
Ada	8,836	50.43%	8,055	45.97%	586	3.34%	28	0.16%	17	0.10%	781	4.46%	17,522
Adams	854	68.37%	325	26.02%	69	5.52%	1	0.08%	0	0.00%	529	42.35%	1,249
Bannock	8,271	63.34%	4,676	35.81%	37	0.28%	55	0.42%	20	0.15%	3,595	27.53%	13,059
Bear Lake	1,721	49.05%	1,785	50.87%	3	0.09%	0	0.00%	0	0.00%	-64	-1.82%	3,509
Benewah	1,602	59.55%	949	35.28%	43	1.60%	83	3.09%	13	0.48%	653	24.28%	2,690
Bingham	3,802	55.85%	2,894	42.52%	73	1.07%	31	0.46%	7	0.10%	908	13.34%	6,807
Blaine	1,133	61.48%	693	37.60%	14	0.76%	3	0.16%	0	0.00%	440	23.87%	1,843
Boise	679	64.12%	342	32.29%	38	3.59%	0	0.00%	0	0.00%	337	31.82%	1,059
Bonner	3,698	63.38%	1,989	34.09%	75	1.29%	52	0.89%	21	0.36%	1,709	29.29%	5,835
Bonneville	4,298	59.60%	2,781	38.56%	109	1.51%	16	0.22%	8	0.11%	1,517	21.03%	7,212
Boundary	1,451	63.42%	763	33.35%	59	2.58%	8	0.35%	7	0.31%	688	30.07%	2,288
Butte	581	59.16%	396	40.33%	5	0.51%	0	0.00%	0	0.00%	185	18.84%	982
Camas	441	63.91%	234	33.91%	15	2.17%	0	0.00%	0	0.00%	207	30.00%	690
Canyon	6,940	53.16%	5,065	38.80%	1,010	7.74%	39	0.30%	0	0.00%	1,875	14.36%	13,054
Caribou	499	54.24%	409	44.46%	12	1.30%	0	0.00%	0	0.00%	90	9.78%	920
Cassia	2,598	55.60%	2,032	43.48%	33	0.71%	10	0.21%	0	0.00%	566	12.11%	4,673
Clark	325	53.99%	276	45.85%	1	0.17%	0	0.00%	0	0.00%	49	8.14%	602
Clearwater	1,699	66.55%	822	32.20%	23	0.90%	9	0.35%	0	0.00%	877	34.35%	2,553
Custer	839	64.39%	440	33.77%	13	1.00%	11	0.84%	0	0.00%	399	30.62%	1,303
Elmore	1,615	64.96%	794	31.94%	72	2.90%	3	0.12%	2	0.08%	821	33.02%	2,486
Franklin	1,871	51.39%	1,764	48.45%	4	0.11%	2	0.05%	0	0.00%	107	2.94%	3,641
Fremont	2,830	65.37%	1,498	34.60%	1	0.02%	0	0.00%	0	0.00%	1,332	30.77%	4,329
Gem	2,007	61.55%	898	27.54%	343	10.52%	2	0.06%	11	0.34%	1,109	34.01%	3,261
Gooding	1,911	53.98%	1,451	40.99%	172	4.86%	2	0.06%	4	0.11%	460	12.99%	3,540
Idaho	3,005	71.79%	1,079	25.78%	79	1.89%	23	0.55%	0	0.00%	1,926	46.01%	4,186
Jefferson	2,501	67.02%	1,177	31.54%	50	1.34%	2	0.05%	2	0.05%	1,324	35.48%	3,732
Jerome	2,219	60.32%	1,393	37.86%	49	1.33%	6	0.16%	12	0.33%	826	22.45%	3,679
Kootenai	4,743	57.40%	2,813	34.04%	572	6.92%	42	0.51%	93	1.13%	1,930	23.36%	8,263
Latah	3,554	52.64%	3,079	45.61%	96	1.42%	22	0.33%	0	0.00%	475	7.04%	6,751
Lemhi	1,332	61.47%	793	36.59%	35	1.62%	7	0.32%	0	0.00%	539	24.87%	2,167
Lewis	1,390	71.03%	526	26.88%	37	1.89%	1	0.05%	3	0.15%	864	44.15%	1,957
Lincoln	869	54.72%	691	43.51%	24	1.51%	4	0.25%	0	0.00%	178	11.21%	1,588
Madison	2,112	61.99%	1,272	37.33%	20	0.59%	3	0.09%	0	0.00%	840	24.66%	3,407
Minidoka	2,164	64.27%	1,130	33.56%	65	1.93%	8	0.24%	0	0.00%	1,034	30.71%	3,367
Nez Perce	5,077	68.50%	2,211	29.83%	79	1.07%	30	0.40%	15	0.20%	2,866	38.67%	7,412
Oneida	1,449	57.64%	1,047	41.65%	18	0.72%	0	0.00%	0	0.00%	402	15.99%	2,514
Owyhee	959	59.57%	583	36.21%	57	3.54%	11	0.68%	0	0.00%	376	23.35%	1,610
Payette	1,836	51.18%	1,529	42.63%	213	5.94%	6	0.17%	3	0.08%	307	8.56%	3,587
Power	1,126	64.86%	603	34.74%	7	0.40%	0	0.00%	0	0.00%	523	30.13%	1,736
Shoshone	4,347	59.15%	2,902	39.49%	60	0.82%	40	0.54%	0	0.00%	1,445	19.66%	7,349
Teton	860	55.81%	674	43.74%	6	0.39%	1	0.06%	0	0.00%	186	12.07%	1,541
Twin Falls	6,395	54.57%	4,928	42.05%	211	1.80%	158	1.35%	27	0.23%	1,467	12.52%	11,719
Valley	921	63.26%	443	30.43%	62	4.26%	1	0.07%	29	1.99%	478	32.83%	1,456
Washington	2,122	60.61%	1,213	34.65%	163	4.66%	3	0.09%	0	0.00%	909	25.96%	3,501
Totals	109,479	58.70%	71,312	38.23%	4,712	2.53%	526	0.28%	491	0.26%	38,167	20.46%	186,520

==== Counties that flipped from Republican to Democratic ====
- Boundary
- Butte
- Cassia
- Clark
- Latah
- Lemhi
- Minidoka
- Owyhee
- Valley
- Washington
- Ada
- Canyon
- Gooding
- Jerome
- Lincoln
- Payette
- Power
- Twins Falls
- Adams
- Bannock
- Benewah
- Bingham
- Blaine
- Bonner
- Boise
- Bonneville
- Camas
- Caribou
- Clearwater
- Custer
- Elmore
- Franklin
- Gem
- Idaho
- Jefferson
- Kootenai
- Lewis
- Madison
- Nez Perce
- Oneida
- Shoshone
- Teton

== See also ==
- United States presidential elections in Idaho
