= United States presidential elections in Idaho =

Presidential elections in Idaho
- Number of elections: 34
- Voted Democratic: 10
- Voted Republican: 23
- Voted other: 1
- Voted for winning candidate: 24
- Voted for losing candidate: 10

Following is a table of United States presidential elections in Idaho, ordered by year. Since its admission to statehood in 1890, Idaho has participated in every U.S. presidential election.

Winners of the state are in bold. The shading refers to the state winner, and not the national winner.

View source data.

== Presidential elections ==
Year	Winner (nationally)	Votes	Percent	Runner-up (nationally)	Votes	Percent	Other national candidates (Note: For purposes of these lists, other candidates are defined as those who were in third place in Idaho. Additionally, a third party did not qualify every single year.)	Votes	Percent	Electoral votes	Ref.
2024	**Donald Trump**	605,246	66.87	Kamala Harris	274,972	30.38	—			4	
2020	Joe Biden	287,021	33.07	**Donald Trump**	554,119	63.84	—			4	
2016	**Donald Trump** (Note: Won the electoral college while losing the popular vote)	409,055	59.25	Hillary Clinton	189,765	27.48	-			4	
2012	Barack Obama	212,787	32.62	**Mitt Romney**	420,911	64.53	-			4	
2008	Barack Obama	236,440	36.09	**John McCain**	403,012	61.52	-			4	
2004	**George W. Bush**	409,235	68.38	John Kerry	181,098	30.26	-			4	
2000	**George W. Bush**	336,937	67.17	Al Gore	138,637	27.64	-			4	
1996	Bill Clinton	165,443	33.65	**Bob Dole**	256,595	52.18	Ross Perot	62,518	12.71	4	
1992	Bill Clinton	137,013	28.42	**George H. W. Bush**	202,645	42.03	Ross Perot	130,395	27.05	4	
1988	**George H. W. Bush**	253,881	62.08	Michael Dukakis	147,272	36.01	-			4	
1984	**Ronald Reagan**	297,523	72.36	Walter Mondale	108,510	26.39	-			4	
1980	**Ronald Reagan**	290,699	66.46	Jimmy Carter	110,192	25.19	John B. Anderson	27,058	6.19	4	
1976	Jimmy Carter	126,549	37.12	**Gerald Ford**	204,151	59.88	-			4	
1972	**Richard Nixon**	199,384	64.24	George McGovern	80,826	26.04	-			4	
1968	**Richard Nixon**	165,369	56.79	Hubert Humphrey	89,273	30.66	George Wallace	36,541	12.55	4	
1964	**Lyndon B. Johnson**	148,920	50.92	Barry Goldwater	143,557	49.08	-			4	
1960	John F. Kennedy	138,853	46.22	**Richard Nixon**	161,597	53.78	-			4	
1956	**Dwight D. Eisenhower**	166,979	61.17	Adlai Stevenson II	105,868	38.78	T. Coleman Andrews/ Unpledged Electors (Note: Was allied with a slate of unpledged electors in Louisiana, Mississippi and South Carolina)	-		4	
1952	**Dwight D. Eisenhower**	180,707	65.42	Adlai Stevenson II	95,081	34.42	-			4	
1948	**Harry S. Truman**	107,370	49.98	Thomas E. Dewey	101,514	47.26	Strom Thurmond	-		4	
1944	**Franklin D. Roosevelt**	107,399	51.55	Thomas E. Dewey	100,137	48.07	-			4	
1940	**Franklin D. Roosevelt**	127,842	54.36	Wendell Willkie	106,553	45.31	-			4	
1936	**Franklin D. Roosevelt**	125,683	62.96	Alf Landon	66,256	33.19	-			4	
1932	**Franklin D. Roosevelt**	109,479	58.66	Herbert Hoover	71,417	38.27	-			4	
1928	**Herbert Hoover**	97,322	64.22	Al Smith	52,926	34.93	-			4	
1924	**Calvin Coolidge**	69,879	47.12	John W. Davis	24,256	16.36	Robert M. La Follette	54,160	36.52	4	
1920	**Warren G. Harding**	88,975	65.6	James M. Cox	46,579	34.34	Parley P. Christensen	-	-	4	
1916	**Woodrow Wilson**	70,054	52.04	Charles E. Hughes	55,368	41.13	-			4	
1912	**Woodrow Wilson**	33,921	32.08	Theodore Roosevelt	25,527	24.14	William H. Taft	32,810	31.02	4	
1908	**William H. Taft**	52,621	54.09	William Jennings Bryan	36,162	37.17	-			3	
1904	**Theodore Roosevelt**	47,783	65.84	Alton B. Parker	18,480	25.46	-			3	
1900	William McKinley	27,198	46.96	**William Jennings Bryan**	29,414	50.79	-			3	
1896	William McKinley	6,314	21.32	**William Jennings Bryan**	23,135	78.1	-			3	
1892	Grover Cleveland	-	-	Benjamin Harrison	8,599	44.31	**James B. Weaver**	10,520	54.21	3	

== See also ==
- Elections in Idaho
- List of United States presidential election results by state
