= Blaine County, Idaho =

County in Idaho, United States

- County
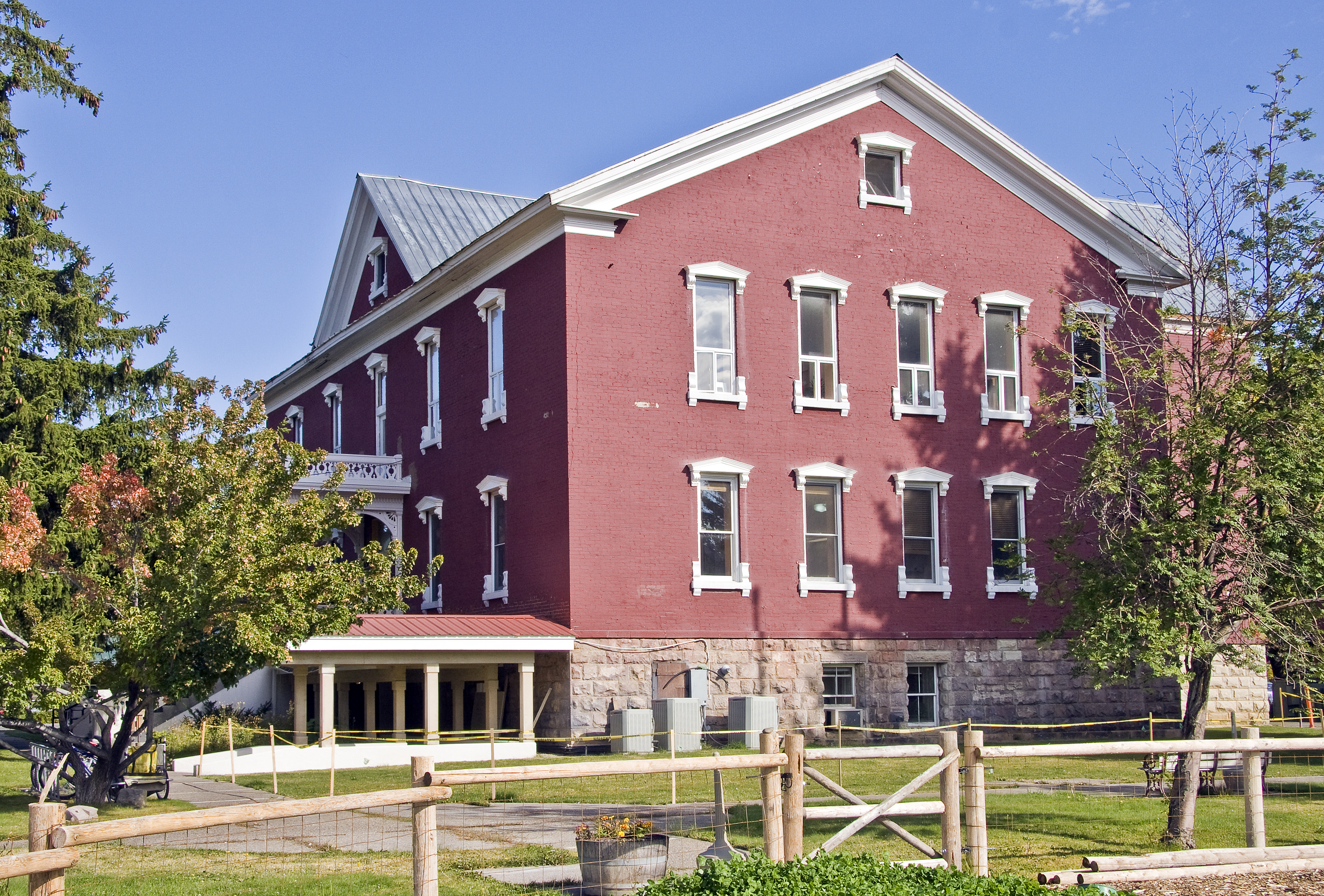
- Blaine County Courthouse

- Seal

- Location within the U.S. state of Idaho
- Coordinates: 43°23′N 113°59′W
- Country: United States
- State: Idaho
- Founded: March 5, 1895
- Named for: James G. Blaine
- Seat: Hailey
- Largest city: Hailey

Area
  - Total: 2,661 sq mi (6,890 km^{2})
  - Land: 2,644 sq mi (6,850 km^{2})
  - Water: 17 sq mi (44 km^{2}) 0.6%

Population (2020)
  - Total: 24,272
  - Estimate (2025): 25,517 ▲
  - Density: 9.1/sq mi (3.5/km^{2})
- Time zone: UTC−7 (Mountain)
  - Summer (DST): UTC−6 (MDT)
- Congressional district: 2nd
- Website: www.blainecountyid.gov

Blaine County is a county in the U.S. state of Idaho. As of the 2020 United States census, the population was 24,272. The county seat and largest city is Hailey. It is also home to the Sun Valley ski resort, adjacent to Ketchum.

Blaine County was created by the territorial legislature on March 5, 1895, by combining Alturas and Logan counties; it was named for former congressman and 1884 Republican presidential nominee James G. Blaine. Its present boundaries were set on February 8, 1917, when a western portion was partitioned off to form Camas County.

Blaine County is part of the Hailey, ID Micropolitan Statistical Area.

== History ==
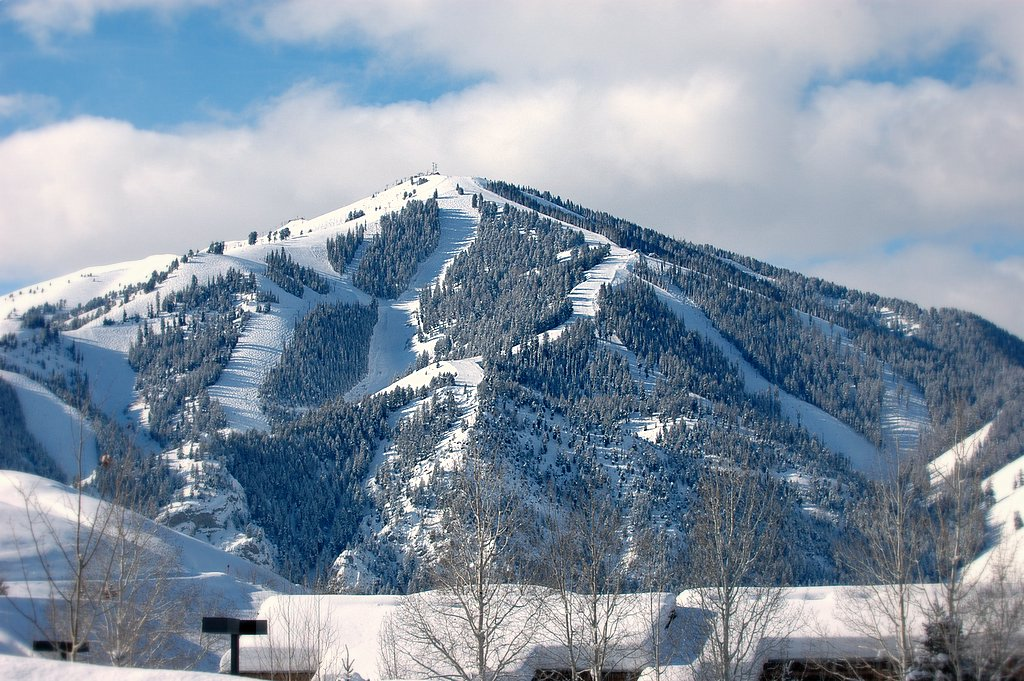
Sun Valley's Bald Mountain in 2006

The Wood River Valley in present-day Blaine County was organized as part of Alturas County by the Idaho Territorial Legislature in 1864. By the 1880s the valley supported a thriving mining commerce; in 1882 the county seat of Alturas County was moved from Rocky Bar in present-day Elmore County to Hailey, in response to a population shift from Rocky Bar – which would eventually become a ghost town – to the Wood River Valley.

The Blaine County boundaries described in its 1895 creation ordinance contained lands that soon were partitioned off to form other counties. Only thirteen days after the official formation date of Blaine, Lincoln County was formed from the county. Lincoln itself was later partitioned to create Gooding (1913), Minidoka (1913), and Jerome (1919) counties. Blaine County was further reduced in 1917 when Camas County was formed.

The strong mining economy of the 1880s had substantially declined by 1890, when Idaho Territory became a state. The county began to recast itself as a tourism destination in 1936 with the opening of the Sun Valley resort, originally owned by the Union Pacific Railroad. The area soon attracted celebrity visitors, and later residents, most notably Ernest Hemingway, who is buried in the Ketchum Cemetery. Celebrities who have lived in Blaine County include Adam West, Demi Moore, and John Kerry.

== County profile ==
Most Blaine County residents live in the Wood River Valley along State Highway 75 in the western half of the county. This area includes all of the county's incorporated cities and towns except Carey, which is located in the south-central part of the county at the junction of US 20 with US 26/93. The county's gerrymandered southeastern panhandle, known locally as the Yale area, is sparsely populated.

As the home of a major ski resort, Blaine County has a higher cost of living than surrounding areas; the median value of its owner-occupied housing units is more than double the state average. As a result, many who work in Blaine County live in outlying areas, particularly in the city of Shoshone in neighboring Lincoln County. It is estimated that 2,540 people from outside the county commute to work in Blaine County.

A portion of Blaine County, the "Yale" area, forms a political peninsula. Douglas S. Jones of the Mini-Cassia News Service wrote that access to a Union Pacific railroad line, and therefore getting tax money from it, is likely why the county wanted that strip of land.

== Government and politics ==
Since 1992, Blaine County has gained a reputation as a Democratic Party enclave in strongly Republican Idaho. The Democratic presidential candidate has won the county in every election since; that year, incumbent George H. W. Bush finished third behind Bill Clinton and Ross Perot. In 2000 and 2004, Blaine was the only Idaho county carried by Al Gore and John Kerry, respectively. Barack Obama carried the county in 2008 by a 33.2% margin over John McCain, while McCain won statewide by a 25.3% margin. It was one of three counties (Latah, Teton) in Idaho won by Obama in 2008, and by far the highest margin. In 2020, Joe Biden defeated incumbent Donald Trump in the county by 36.8 percentage points, with his 67.1% vote share being the highest for any Democrat since 1900.

Obama also carried Blaine County in 2012 with 58.8 percent of the vote, compared to Mitt Romney's 38.7 percent. Blaine County was the only Idaho county in which Obama received over 50 percent of the vote, although he also carried Latah County with 49.6 percent of the vote. From 1968 through 1988, a less populated Blaine County was won by the Republican candidate in all six presidential elections, as was the state of Idaho, although even then the county voted more Democratic than Idaho as a whole in every election going back to 1924.

Similar to other Idaho counties, an elected three-member county commission heads the county government. Other elected officials include clerk, treasurer, sheriff, assessor, and prosecutor.

In 2006, Blaine County voted 66.3% against HJR 2, which amended the Idaho Constitution to outlaw same-sex marriage in Idaho; the measure passed with 63.4% of the statewide vote. Latah County (Moscow, home of the University of Idaho) was the only other county where the measure failed.

Until the 2021 redistricting cycle, Blaine County at the state level was located in Legislative District 25, with an all-Democratic delegation in the Idaho Legislature. Michelle Stennett, a former minority leader of the Idaho Senate, and Wendy Jaquet, a member of the Idaho House of Representatives and a former minority leader of that body, both live in Ketchum.

United States presidential election results for Blaine County, Idaho
Year	Republican		Democratic		Third party(ies)	
Year	No.	%	No.	%	No.	%
1892	290	32.66%	0	0.00%	598	67.34%
1896	59	4.57%	1,228	95.19%	3	0.23%
1900	634	32.04%	1,345	67.96%	0	0.00%
1904	1,225	56.37%	775	35.66%	173	7.96%
1908	1,197	46.04%	1,248	48.00%	155	5.96%
1912	988	35.95%	996	36.24%	764	27.80%
1916	1,231	37.88%	1,830	56.31%	189	5.82%
1920	1,169	67.57%	561	32.43%	0	0.00%
1924	732	41.59%	543	30.85%	485	27.56%
1928	849	51.96%	780	47.74%	5	0.31%
1932	693	37.60%	1,133	61.48%	17	0.92%
1936	735	34.88%	1,361	64.59%	11	0.52%
1940	1,124	41.83%	1,559	58.02%	4	0.15%
1944	874	45.62%	1,037	54.12%	5	0.26%
1948	945	43.71%	1,182	54.67%	35	1.62%
1952	1,609	60.90%	1,033	39.10%	0	0.00%
1956	1,384	58.59%	978	41.41%	0	0.00%
1960	1,216	49.27%	1,252	50.73%	0	0.00%
1964	1,161	47.31%	1,293	52.69%	0	0.00%
1968	1,337	53.82%	815	32.81%	332	13.37%
1972	2,113	60.98%	1,240	35.79%	112	3.23%
1976	2,176	56.13%	1,604	41.37%	97	2.50%
1980	2,716	49.12%	1,840	33.28%	973	17.60%
1984	3,603	63.69%	1,971	34.84%	83	1.47%
1988	3,130	54.39%	2,498	43.41%	127	2.21%
1992	2,243	28.25%	2,865	36.09%	2,831	35.66%
1996	3,003	36.55%	3,840	46.73%	1,374	16.72%
2000	3,528	44.44%	3,748	47.22%	662	8.34%
2004	4,034	39.76%	5,992	59.05%	121	1.19%
2008	3,439	32.53%	6,947	65.71%	187	1.77%
2012	3,939	38.64%	5,992	58.78%	263	2.58%
2016	3,340	31.15%	6,416	59.83%	968	9.03%
2020	4,032	30.32%	8,919	67.08%	346	2.60%
2024	4,281	32.71%	8,424	64.36%	384	2.93%

== Geography ==
According to the U.S. Census Bureau, the county has a total area of 2,661 square miles (6,890 km^{2}), of which 2,644 square miles (6,850 km^{2}) is land and 17 square miles (44 km^{2}) (0.6%) is water.

=== Adjacent counties ===
- Butte County – northeast
- Bingham County – east
- Power County – southeast
- Cassia County – south
- Minidoka County – southeast
- Lincoln County – south
- Camas County – west
- Elmore County – northwest
- Custer County – northwest

=== Major highways ===
- – US 20
- – US 26
- – US 93
- SH-75 – Sawtooth Scenic Byway

=== National protected areas ===
- Craters of the Moon National Monument (part)
- Minidoka National Wildlife Refuge (part)
- Salmon-Challis National Forest (part)
- Sawtooth National Forest (part)
- Sawtooth National Recreation Area (part)
  - Hemingway–Boulders Wilderness (part)
  - Sawtooth Wilderness (part)

== Demographics ==
Historical population
Census	Pop.	Note	%±
1900	4,900		—
1910	8,387		71.2%
1920	4,473		−46.7%
1930	3,768		−15.8%
1940	5,295		40.5%
1950	5,384		1.7%
1960	4,598		−14.6%
1970	5,749		25.0%
1980	9,841		71.2%
1990	13,552		37.7%
2000	18,991		40.1%
2010	21,376		12.6%
2020	24,272		13.5%
2025 (est.)	25,517	▲	5.1%
US Decennial Census; 1790–1960 1900–1990; 1990–2000 2010–2020 2020

=== Racial and ethnic composition ===
Blaine County, Idaho – Racial and ethnic composition Note: the US Census treats Hispanic/Latino as an ethnic category. This table excludes Latinos from the racial categories and assigns them to a separate category. Hispanics/Latinos may be of any race.
Race / Ethnicity (NH = Non-Hispanic)	Pop 1980	Pop 1990	Pop 2000	Pop 2010	Pop 2020	% 1980	% 1990	% 2000	% 2010	% 2020
White alone (NH)	9,580	12,999	16,531	16,669	18,024	97.35%	95.92%	87.05%	77.98%	74.26%
Black or African American alone (NH)	5	10	12	23	45	0.05%	0.07%	0.06%	0.11%	0.19%
Native American or Alaska Native alone (NH)	28	46	43	44	34	0.28%	0.34%	0.23%	0.21%	0.14%
Asian alone (NH)	29	97	118	174	211	0.29%	0.72%	0.62%	0.81%	0.87%
Native Hawaiian or Pacific Islander alone (NH)	x	x	13	14	15	x	x	0.07%	0.07%	0.06%
Other race alone (NH)	10	3	31	17	116	0.10%	0.02%	0.16%	0.08%	0.48%
Mixed race or Multiracial (NH)	x	x	213	163	806	x	x	1.12%	0.76%	3.32%
Hispanic or Latino (any race)	189	397	2,030	4,272	5,021	1.92%	2.93%	10.69%	19.99%	20.69%
Total	9,841	13,552	18,991	21,376	24,272	100.00%	100.00%	100.00%	100.00%	100.00%

=== 2020 census ===
As of the 2020 census, the county had a population of 24,272. The median age was 45.4 years. 21.1% of residents were under the age of 18 and 21.9% of residents were 65 years of age or older. For every 100 females there were 99.9 males, and for every 100 females age 18 and over there were 99.5 males age 18 and over.

The racial makeup of the county was 76.9% White, 0.2% Black or African American, 0.6% American Indian and Alaska Native, 0.9% Asian, 0.1% Native Hawaiian and Pacific Islander, 12.2% from some other race, and 9.2% from two or more races. Hispanic or Latino residents of any race comprised 20.7% of the population.

75.7% of residents lived in urban areas, while 24.3% lived in rural areas.

There were 10,225 households in the county, of which 27.7% had children under the age of 18 living with them and 23.4% had a female householder with no spouse or partner present. About 29.2% of all households were made up of individuals and 13.1% had someone living alone who was 65 years of age or older.

There were 15,436 housing units, of which 33.8% were vacant. Among occupied housing units, 69.9% were owner-occupied and 30.1% were renter-occupied. The homeowner vacancy rate was 1.8% and the rental vacancy rate was 11.3%.

=== 2010 census ===
As of the 2010 United States census, there were 21,376 people, 8,823 households, and 5,575 families in the county. The population density was 8.1 inhabitants per square mile (3.1/km^{2}). There were 15,050 housing units at an average density of 5.7 units per square mile (2.2 units/km^{2}). The racial makeup of the county was 84.9% white, 0.9% Asian, 0.6% American Indian, 0.2% black or African American, 0.1% Pacific islander, 11.8% from other races, and 1.5% from two or more races. Those of Hispanic or Latino origin made up 20.0% of the population. In terms of ancestry, 24.1% were German, 18.8% were English, 11.4% were Irish, and 7.9% were American.

Of the 8,823 households, 32.1% had children under the age of 18 living with them, 51.8% were married couples living together, 7.3% had a female householder with no husband present, 36.8% were non-families, and 28.7% of all households were made up of individuals. The average household size was 2.39 and the average family size was 2.99. The median age was 40.4 years.

The median income for a household in the county was $61,854 and the median income for a family was $73,929. Males had a median income of $48,036 versus $37,603 for females. The per capita income for the county was $32,656. About 4.9% of families and 9.3% of the population were below the poverty line, including 10.9% of those under age 18 and 8.2% of those age 65 or over.

=== 2000 census ===
As of the 2000 United States census, there were 18,991 people, 7,780 households, and 4,839 families in the county. The population density was 7 people per square mile (2.7 people/km^{2}). There were 12,186 housing units at an average density of 5 units per square mile (1.9 units/km^{2}). The racial makeup of the county was 90.73% White, 0.13% Black or African American, 0.33% Native American, 0.73% Asian, 0.07% Pacific Islander, 6.43% from other races, and 1.57% from two or more races. 10.69% of the population were Hispanic or Latino of any race. 17.0% were of English, 14.6% German, 10.8% Irish and 6.2% American ancestry.

There were 7,780 households, out of which 31.90% had children under the age of 18 living with them, 51.20% were married couples living together, 7.20% had a female householder with no husband present, and 37.80% were non-families. 27.30% of all households were made up of individuals, and 5.50% had someone living alone who was 65 years of age or older. The average household size was 2.40 and the average family size was 2.96.

The county population contained 24.00% under the age of 18, 7.70% from 18 to 24, 32.60% from 25 to 44, 27.90% from 45 to 64, and 7.80% who were 65 years of age or older. The median age was 37 years. For every 100 females there were 107.90 males. For every 100 females age 18 and over, there were 106.80 males.

The median income for a household in the county was $50,496, and the median income for a family was $60,037. Males had a median income of $35,949 versus $27,487 for females. The per capita income for the county was $31,346. About 4.90% of families and 7.80% of the population were below the poverty line, including 7.80% of those under age 18 and 5.30% of those age 65 or over.

== Education ==
All but one public school in the county is administered by the Blaine County School District 61. The school district covers the entire county. There are three district-operated public schools in the county that have high school divisions: Wood River High School in Hailey, Carey School in Carey, and Silver Creek High School in Hailey. Syringa Mountain School is the first charter school to be approved in Blaine County; it opened in 2014.

Students living in the rural Yale area in the county's southeastern panhandle are sent to schools in neighboring Minidoka County, operated by the Minidoka County School District. The Blaine district pays money to the Minidoka district to send the Yale students to Minidoka schools.

Private schools include Community School in Sun Valley and The Sage School in Hailey.

The College of Southern Idaho, a community college based in Twin Falls, operates an off-campus outreach center in Hailey. The county is in the catchment area, but not the taxation zone, for College of Southern Idaho.

== Communities ==
=== Cities ===
- Bellevue
- Carey
- Hailey
- Ketchum
- Sun Valley

=== Census-designated place ===
- Gannett

=== Unincorporated communities ===
- Cathedral Pines
- Doniphan
- Galena
- Gimlet
- Picabo
- Triumph
- Sawtooth City
- Stanton Crossing
- Tikura

=== Ghost towns ===
- Boulder
- Vienna

== Media ==
In 1993, it was not common for residents of the rural Yale area to read newspapers that are published in the county, and as a consequence many of them were not informed about changes in taxation that affected them.

== Festivals ==
Blaine County hosts Wagon Days, Trailing of the Sheep Festival, Sun Valley Harvest Festival, and the Sun Valley for the Arts Wine Auction, among other events.

The Blaine County Fair is an annual summer event.

== See also ==
- National Register of Historic Places listings in Blaine County, Idaho
