= 1968 United States presidential election in Idaho =

- November 5, 1968

Nominee	Richard Nixon	Hubert Humphrey	George Wallace
Party	Republican	Democratic	American Independent
Home state	New York (Note: Although he was born in California and he served as a U.S. senator from California, in 1968 Richard Nixon’s official state of residence was New York, because he moved there to practice law after his defeat in the 1962 California gubernatorial election. During his first term as president, Nixon re-established his residency in California. Consequently, most reliable reference books list Nixon's home state as New York in the 1968 election and his home state as California in the 1972 (and 1960) election.)	Minnesota	Alabama
Running mate	Spiro Agnew	Edmund Muskie	Curtis LeMay
Electoral vote	4	0	0
Popular vote	165,369	89,273	36,541
Percentage	56.79%	30.66%	12.55%
County results
Nixon
40–50%
50–60%
60–70%
Humphrey
40–50%
50–60%
President before election
Lyndon B. Johnson
Democratic
Elected President
Richard Nixon
Republican

The 1968 United States presidential election in Idaho took place on November 5, 1968, as part of the 1968 United States presidential election. State voters chose four representatives, or electors, to the Electoral College, who voted for president and vice president.

Idaho was won by former Vice President Richard Nixon (R–New York), with 56.79% of the popular vote, against former Senator and incumbent Vice President Hubert Humphrey (D–Minnesota), with 30.66% of the popular vote. Alabama Governor George Wallace, who ran as a member of the American Independent Party, performed quite well, finishing with 12.55% of the popular vote.

With 56.79% of the popular vote, Idaho would prove to be Nixon's second strongest state in the 1968 election after Nebraska.

== Results ==
1968 United States presidential election in Idaho
Party	Candidate	Votes	%
Republican	Richard Nixon	165,369	56.79%
Democratic	Hubert Humphrey	89,273	30.66%
American Independent	George Wallace	36,541	12.55%
Total votes		291,183	100.00%

=== Results by county ===
County	Richard Nixon Republican		Hubert Humphrey Democratic		George Wallace American Independent		Margin		Total votes cast
County	#	%	#	%	#	%	#	%	Total votes cast
Ada	30,185	63.04%	11,529	24.08%	6,167	12.88%	18,656	38.96%	47,881
Adams	844	58.98%	360	25.16%	227	15.86%	484	33.82%	1,431
Bannock	10,234	47.97%	9,084	42.58%	2,016	9.45%	1,150	5.39%	21,334
Bear Lake	1,866	60.17%	1,058	34.12%	177	5.71%	808	26.05%	3,101
Benewah	1,125	44.41%	1,160	45.80%	248	9.79%	-35	-1.39%	2,533
Bingham	6,484	60.23%	2,988	27.76%	1,293	12.01%	3,496	32.47%	10,765
Blaine	1,337	53.82%	815	32.81%	332	13.37%	522	21.01%	2,484
Boise	450	55.62%	205	25.34%	154	19.04%	245	30.28%	809
Bonner	3,240	45.75%	3,063	43.25%	779	11.00%	177	2.50%	7,082
Bonneville	13,582	64.52%	5,178	24.60%	2,290	10.88%	8,404	39.92%	21,050
Boundary	1,084	47.19%	883	38.44%	330	14.37%	201	8.75%	2,297
Butte	691	50.96%	521	38.42%	144	10.62%	170	12.54%	1,356
Camas	271	56.22%	118	24.48%	93	19.29%	153	31.74%	482
Canyon	14,995	62.75%	5,717	23.92%	3,186	13.33%	9,278	38.83%	23,898
Caribou	1,731	62.15%	727	26.10%	327	11.74%	1,004	36.05%	2,785
Cassia	4,187	64.17%	1,350	20.69%	988	15.14%	2,837	43.48%	6,525
Clark	271	66.58%	87	21.38%	49	12.04%	184	45.20%	407
Clearwater	1,287	37.11%	1,838	53.00%	343	9.89%	-551	-15.89%	3,468
Custer	711	49.96%	385	27.06%	327	22.98%	326	22.90%	1,423
Elmore	1,908	50.62%	1,230	32.63%	631	16.74%	678	17.99%	3,769
Franklin	2,509	66.11%	831	21.90%	455	11.99%	1,678	44.21%	3,795
Fremont	2,297	58.52%	961	24.48%	667	16.99%	1,336	34.04%	3,925
Gem	2,314	57.89%	1,183	29.60%	500	12.51%	1,131	28.29%	3,997
Gooding	2,349	55.56%	1,018	24.08%	861	20.36%	1,331	31.48%	4,228
Idaho	2,317	47.15%	1,883	38.32%	714	14.53%	434	8.83%	4,914
Jefferson	2,927	61.48%	955	20.06%	879	18.46%	1,972	41.42%	4,761
Jerome	2,785	60.52%	976	21.21%	841	18.27%	1,809	39.31%	4,602
Kootenai	7,092	48.01%	6,207	42.02%	1,472	9.97%	885	5.99%	14,771
Latah	4,708	51.59%	3,782	41.44%	636	6.97%	926	10.15%	9,126
Lemhi	1,476	57.61%	547	21.35%	539	21.04%	929	36.26%	2,562
Lewis	697	38.70%	927	51.47%	177	9.83%	-230	-12.77%	1,801
Lincoln	972	62.91%	350	22.65%	223	14.43%	622	40.26%	1,545
Madison	2,971	67.71%	904	20.60%	513	11.69%	2,067	47.11%	4,388
Minidoka	3,182	56.28%	1,332	23.56%	1,140	20.16%	1,850	32.72%	5,654
Nez Perce	5,019	39.90%	6,502	51.69%	1,058	8.41%	-1,483	-11.79%	12,579
Oneida	1,114	66.15%	465	27.61%	105	6.24%	649	38.54%	1,684
Owyhee	1,385	59.62%	562	24.19%	376	16.19%	823	35.43%	2,323
Payette	3,032	61.18%	1,216	24.54%	708	14.29%	1,816	36.64%	4,956
Power	1,222	60.26%	582	28.70%	224	11.05%	640	31.56%	2,028
Shoshone	3,080	40.60%	3,850	50.74%	657	8.66%	-770	-10.14%	7,587
Teton	694	57.93%	376	31.39%	128	10.68%	318	26.54%	1,198
Twin Falls	11,564	62.94%	4,001	21.78%	2,808	15.28%	7,563	41.16%	18,373
Valley	1,160	57.94%	534	26.67%	308	15.38%	626	31.27%	2,002
Washington	2,020	57.65%	1,033	29.48%	451	12.87%	987	28.17%	3,504
Totals	165,369	56.79%	89,273	30.66%	36,541	12.55%	76,096	26.13%	291,183

==== Counties that flipped from Democratic to Republican ====
- Adams
- Bannock
- Bear Lake
- Blaine
- Boise
- Bonner
- Boundary
- Butte
- Caribou
- Elmore
- Fremont
- Gem
- Idaho
- Kootenai
- Latah
- Power
- Valley
- Washington

=== Results by congressional district ===
Nixon won both of Idaho's congressional districts.

District	Nixon	Humphrey	Wallace
1st	54.7%	33.4%	11.9%
2nd	59.4%	27.3%	13.4%

== See also ==
- United States presidential elections in Idaho
