= 1916 United States presidential election in Idaho =

- November 7, 1916

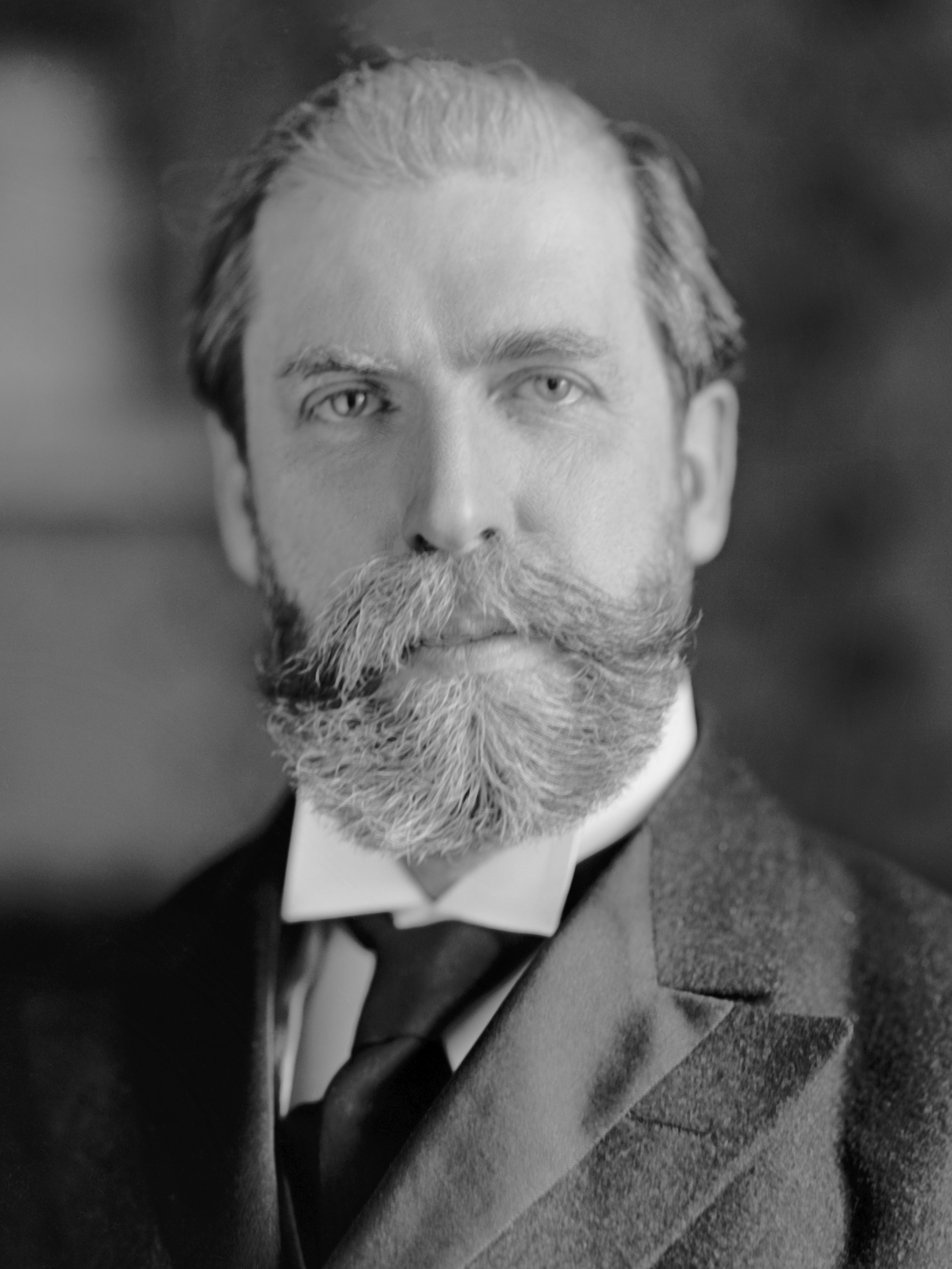

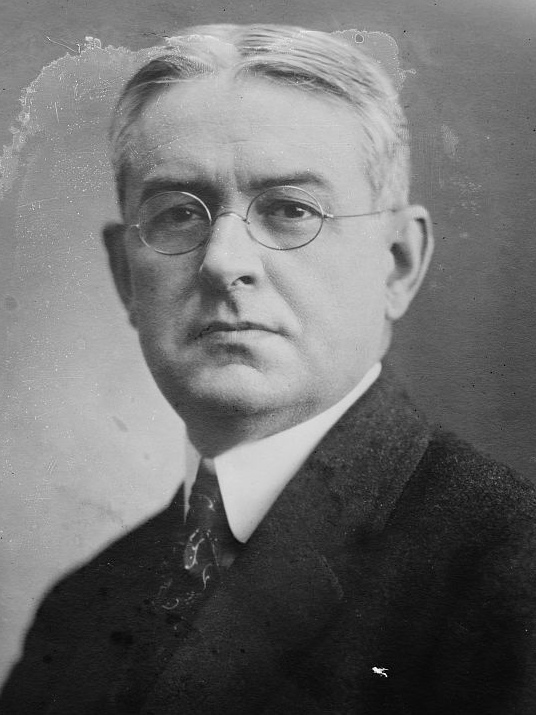
Nominee	Woodrow Wilson	Charles Evans Hughes	Allan L. Benson
Party	Democratic	Republican	Socialist
Home state	New Jersey	New York	New York
Running mate	Thomas R. Marshall	Charles W. Fairbanks	George Ross Kirkpatrick
Electoral vote	4	0	0
Popular vote	70,054	55,368	8,066
Percentage	52.04%	41.13%	5.99%
County results
Wilson
40–50%
50–60%
60–70%
Hughes
40–50%
President before election
Woodrow Wilson
Democratic
Elected President
Woodrow Wilson
Democratic

The 1916 United States presidential election in Idaho took place on November 7, 1916 as part of the 1916 United States presidential election in which all contemporary forty-eight states participated. State voters chose four electors, or representatives to the Electoral College, who voted for president and vice president.

At state level, Idaho had begun in 1902 to be very much a one-party Republican state, which it has largely remained since apart from the New Deal era of the 1930s and 1940s. For a time there was also a perception that the William Jennings Bryan-led Democratic Party had failed as a “party of reform”.

In 1912, Woodrow Wilson had carried Idaho by 1.06 points with less than one-third of the total vote due to severe divisions within the GOP between conservative incumbent William Howard Taft and Progressive former President Theodore Roosevelt. In contrast to the East where supporters of Theodore Roosevelt's "Bull Moose" Party rapidly returned to the Republicans, in the Mountain States many if not most of these supporters turned to the Democratic Party not only in presidential elections, but also in state and federal legislative ones. Another factor helping Wilson was a powerful "peace vote" in the Western states due to opposition to participation in World War I, and a third was that a considerable part of the substantial vote for Eugene Debs from the previous election was turned over to Wilson owing to such Progressive reforms as the Sixteenth and Seventeenth Amendments.

The consequence of these trends was that Idaho would vote strongly for Wilson over Republican nominee Charles Evans Hughes, who was viewed as an easterner who epitomized the oligarchic interests so suspect in the Mountain States. Wilson gained almost twenty percent upon his 1912 performance, and carried all but five counties.

== Results ==
Presidential Candidate	Running Mate	Party	Electoral Vote (EV)	Popular Vote (PV)	
Woodrow Wilson of New Jersey	Thomas R. Marshall	Democratic	4	70,054	52.04%
Charles Evans Hughes	Charles W. Fairbanks	Republican	0	55,368	41.13%
Allan L. Benson	George Ross Kirkpatrick	Socialist	0	8,066	5.99%
Frank Hanly	Ira Landrith	Prohibition	0	1,127	0.84%

=== Results by county ===
County	Thomas Woodrow Wilson Democratic		Charles Evans Hughes Republican		Allan Louis Benson Socialist		James Franklin Hanly Prohibition		Margin		Total votes cast
County	#	%	#	%	#	%	#	%	#	%	Total votes cast
Ada	5,207	47.48%	5,299	48.32%	359	3.27%	101	0.92%	-92	-0.84%	10,966
Adams	645	44.67%	667	46.19%	129	8.93%	3	0.21%	-22	-1.52%	1,444
Bannock	4,084	55.52%	2,950	40.10%	298	4.05%	24	0.33%	1,134	15.42%	7,356
Bear Lake	1,566	55.36%	1,229	43.44%	31	1.10%	3	0.11%	337	11.91%	2,829
Benewah	1,374	51.52%	935	35.06%	337	12.64%	21	0.79%	439	16.46%	2,667
Bingham	2,306	53.02%	1,885	43.34%	145	3.33%	13	0.30%	421	9.68%	4,349
Blaine	1,830	56.31%	1,231	37.88%	173	5.32%	16	0.49%	599	18.43%	3,250
Boise	1,048	57.17%	657	35.84%	113	6.16%	15	0.82%	391	21.33%	1,833
Bonner	2,003	51.96%	1,417	36.76%	409	10.61%	26	0.67%	586	15.20%	3,855
Bonneville	2,341	56.13%	1,736	41.62%	85	2.04%	9	0.22%	605	14.50%	4,171
Boundary	653	48.12%	598	44.07%	99	7.30%	7	0.52%	55	4.05%	1,357
Canyon	4,478	49.98%	3,570	39.84%	645	7.20%	267	2.98%	908	10.13%	8,960
Cassia	1,629	50.05%	1,320	40.55%	289	8.88%	17	0.52%	309	9.49%	3,255
Clearwater	678	38.28%	839	47.37%	242	13.66%	12	0.68%	-161	-9.09%	1,771
Custer	879	62.38%	454	32.22%	63	4.47%	13	0.92%	425	30.16%	1,409
Elmore	1,104	59.61%	658	35.53%	82	4.43%	8	0.43%	446	24.08%	1,852
Franklin	1,425	55.97%	1,089	42.77%	30	1.18%	2	0.08%	336	13.20%	2,546
Fremont	2,695	59.23%	1,654	36.35%	194	4.26%	7	0.15%	1,041	22.88%	4,550
Gem	990	52.11%	750	39.47%	146	7.68%	14	0.74%	240	12.63%	1,900
Gooding	1,089	47.41%	1,093	47.58%	97	4.22%	18	0.78%	-4	-0.17%	2,297
Idaho	2,265	49.76%	1,892	41.56%	370	8.13%	25	0.55%	373	8.19%	4,552
Jefferson	1,606	58.94%	993	36.44%	115	4.22%	11	0.40%	613	22.50%	2,725
Kootenai	2,855	44.46%	2,741	42.68%	714	11.12%	112	1.74%	114	1.78%	6,422
Latah	2,811	45.54%	2,777	44.99%	435	7.05%	149	2.41%	34	0.55%	6,172
Lemhi	1,080	57.32%	723	38.38%	79	4.19%	2	0.11%	357	18.95%	1,884
Lewis	1,255	54.71%	901	39.28%	118	5.14%	20	0.87%	354	15.43%	2,294
Lincoln	1,084	46.99%	1,121	48.59%	95	4.12%	7	0.30%	-37	-1.60%	2,307
Madison	1,371	54.32%	1,132	44.85%	21	0.83%	0	0.00%	239	9.47%	2,524
Minidoka	1,135	42.69%	963	36.22%	540	20.31%	21	0.79%	172	6.47%	2,659
Nez Perce	2,675	56.46%	1,753	37.00%	245	5.17%	65	1.37%	922	19.46%	4,738
Oneida	1,298	55.40%	1,014	43.28%	29	1.24%	2	0.09%	284	12.12%	2,343
Owyhee	775	52.76%	594	40.44%	82	5.58%	18	1.23%	181	12.32%	1,469
Power	1,079	49.95%	1,024	47.41%	50	2.31%	7	0.32%	55	2.55%	2,160
Shoshone	4,239	59.11%	2,431	33.90%	485	6.76%	16	0.22%	1,808	25.21%	7,171
Teton	726	51.86%	650	46.43%	21	1.50%	3	0.21%	76	5.43%	1,400
Twin Falls	3,974	51.60%	3,083	40.03%	592	7.69%	52	0.68%	891	11.57%	7,701
Washington	1,802	51.83%	1,545	44.43%	109	3.13%	21	0.60%	257	7.39%	3,477
Totals	70,054	52.04%	55,368	41.13%	8,066	5.99%	1,127	0.84%	14,686	10.91%	134,615

== See also ==
- United States presidential elections in Idaho
