= 1908 United States presidential election in Idaho =

- November 3, 1908

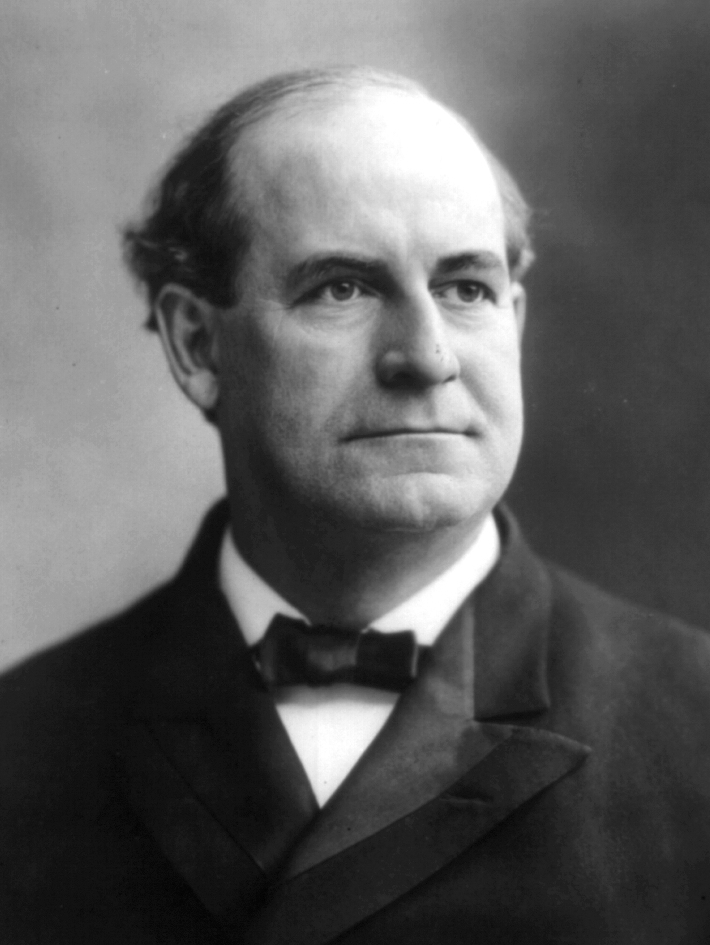

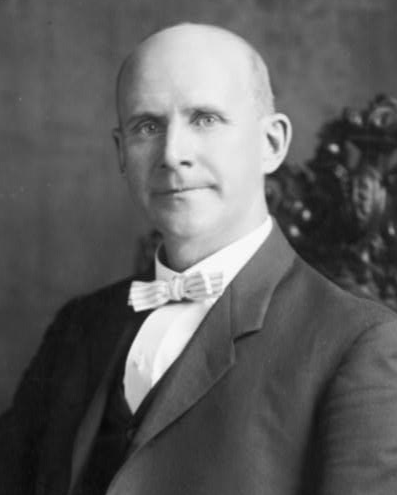
Nominee	William Howard Taft	William Jennings Bryan	Eugene V. Debs
Party	Republican	Democratic	Socialist
Home state	Ohio	Nebraska	Indiana
Running mate	James S. Sherman	John W. Kern	Ben Hanford
Electoral vote	3	0	0
Popular vote	52,621	36,162	6,400
Percentage	54.09%	37.17%	6.58%
County results
Taft
40–50%
50–60%
60–70%
Bryan
40–50%
President before election
Theodore Roosevelt
Republican
Elected President
William Howard Taft
Republican

The 1908 United States presidential election in Idaho took place on November 3, 1908. All contemporary 46 states were part of the 1908 United States presidential election. State voters chose three electors to the Electoral College, who selected the president and vice president.

Idaho was won by the Republican nominees, former Secretary of War William Howard Taft of Ohio and his running mate James S. Sherman of New York. They defeated the Democratic nominees, former U.S. Representative William Jennings Bryan and his running mate John W. Kern of Indiana. Taft won the state by a margin of 16.92%.

Bryan had previously won Idaho against Republican William McKinley in both 1896 and 1900.

As of 2024, this is the last time Idaho did not have four electoral votes.

== Results ==
1908 United States presidential election in Idaho
Party	Candidate	Votes	Percentage	Electoral votes
Republican	William Howard Taft	52,621	54.09%	3
Democratic	William Jennings Bryan	36,162	37.17%	0
Social Democratic	Eugene V. Debs	6,400	6.58%	0
Prohibition	Eugene W. Chafin	1,986	2.04%	0
Independence	Thomas L. Hisgen	124	0.13%	0
Totals		97,293	100.00%	3
Voter turnout				—

=== Results by county ===
County	William Howard Taft Republican		William Jennings Bryan Democratic		Eugene Victor Debs Socialist		Eugene Wilder Chafin Prohibition		Thomas Louis Hisgen Independence		Margin		Total votes cast
County	#	%	#	%	#	%	#	%	#	%	#	%	Total votes cast
Ada	4,778	53.08%	3,721	41.34%	276	3.07%	224	2.49%	3	0.03%	1,057	11.74%	9,002
Bannock	2,690	56.75%	1,892	39.92%	133	2.81%	20	0.42%	5	0.11%	798	16.84%	4,740
Bear Lake	1,460	60.43%	933	38.62%	14	0.58%	6	0.25%	3	0.12%	527	21.81%	2,416
Bingham	3,277	59.90%	1,750	31.99%	390	7.13%	41	0.75%	13	0.24%	1,527	27.91%	5,471
Blaine	1,197	46.00%	1,248	47.96%	123	4.73%	26	1.00%	8	0.31%	-51	-1.96%	2,602
Boise	885	45.71%	862	44.52%	156	8.06%	27	1.39%	6	0.31%	23	1.19%	1,936
Bonner	2,537	59.12%	1,223	28.50%	448	10.44%	68	1.58%	15	0.35%	1,314	30.62%	4,291
Canyon	4,023	54.28%	2,783	37.55%	279	3.76%	324	4.37%	2	0.03%	1,240	16.73%	7,411
Cassia	1,049	58.73%	600	33.59%	105	5.88%	22	1.23%	10	0.56%	449	25.14%	1,786
Custer	521	43.09%	598	49.46%	84	6.95%	5	0.41%	1	0.08%	-77	-6.37%	1,209
Elmore	662	42.38%	660	42.25%	194	12.42%	37	2.37%	9	0.58%	2	0.13%	1,562
Fremont	3,920	54.44%	2,854	39.63%	405	5.62%	15	0.21%	7	0.10%	1,066	14.80%	7,201
Idaho	2,129	47.83%	1,833	41.18%	397	8.92%	86	1.93%	6	0.13%	296	6.65%	4,451
Kootenai	4,407	55.02%	2,206	27.54%	1,094	13.66%	284	3.55%	19	0.24%	2,201	27.48%	8,010
Latah	3,101	56.12%	1,802	32.61%	296	5.36%	324	5.86%	3	0.05%	1,299	23.51%	5,526
Lemhi	809	48.88%	777	46.95%	58	3.50%	6	0.36%	5	0.30%	32	1.93%	1,655
Lincoln	1,310	54.29%	805	33.36%	262	10.86%	33	1.37%	3	0.12%	505	20.93%	2,413
Nez Perce	3,871	51.51%	2,843	37.83%	551	7.33%	233	3.10%	17	0.23%	1,028	13.68%	7,515
Oneida	2,595	61.42%	1,519	35.95%	98	2.32%	11	0.26%	2	0.05%	1,076	25.47%	4,225
Owyhee	604	45.01%	650	48.44%	69	5.14%	13	0.97%	6	0.45%	-46	-3.43%	1,342
Shoshone	3,256	55.07%	2,109	35.67%	512	8.66%	33	0.56%	2	0.03%	1,147	19.40%	5,912
Twin Falls	1,757	55.57%	1,053	33.30%	259	8.19%	91	2.88%	2	0.06%	704	22.26%	3,162
Washington	1,816	51.20%	1,474	41.56%	197	5.55%	57	1.61%	3	0.08%	342	9.64%	3,547
Totals (Note: These figures differ from those in Dave Leip’s U.S. Election Atlas.)	52,654	54.07%	36,195	37.17%	6,400	6.57%	1,986	2.04%	150	0.15%	16,459	16.90%	97,385

== See also ==
- United States presidential elections in Idaho
