= Gannett, Idaho =

Unincorporated community in the state of Idaho, United States

- Unincorporated community and Census-designated place
- Location within the state of Idaho Gannett, Idaho (the United States)
- Coordinates: 43°21′25″N 114°10′32″W
- Country: United States
- State: Idaho
- County: Blaine
- Elevation: 4,918 ft (1,499 m)

Population (2020)
  - Total: 174
- Time zone: UTC-7 (Mountain (MST))
  - Summer (DST): UTC-6 (MDT)
- ZIP codes: 83313
- Area codes: 208, 986
- GNIS feature ID: 2806610

Gannett is an unincorporated community and Census-designated place in Blaine County in the U.S. state of Idaho. The population at the 2020 census was 174.

Gannett is located 8 mi (12.9 km) southeast of Bellevue on Gannett Road between State Highway 75 and U.S. Route 20.

== History ==
Gannett's population was 20 in 1960.

== Education ==
Blaine County School District is the school district for the entire county.

The county is in the catchment area, but not the taxation zone, for College of Southern Idaho.
