= 1920 United States presidential election in Idaho =

- November 2, 1920
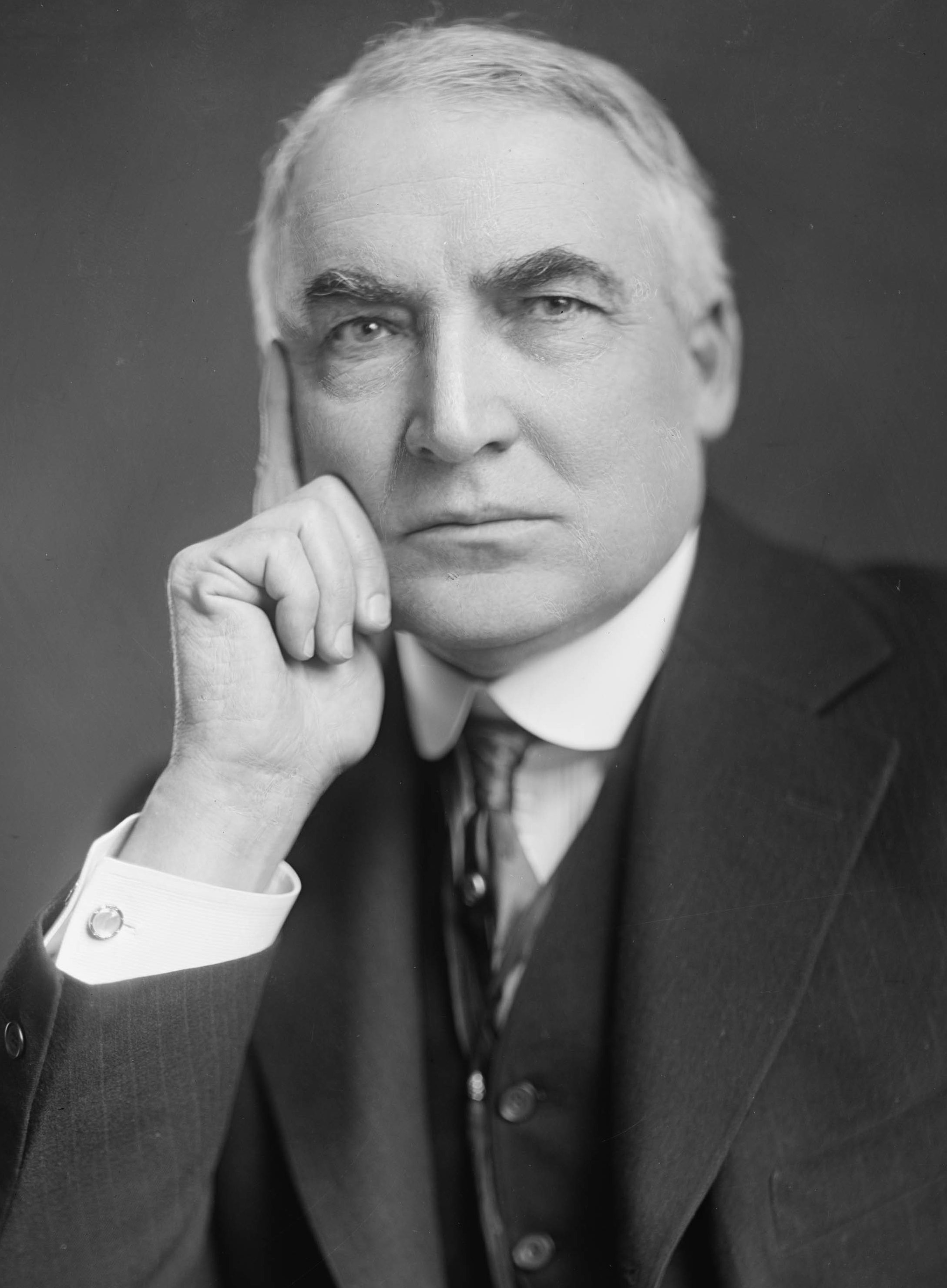

Nominee	Warren G. Harding	James M. Cox
Party	Republican	Democratic
Home state	Ohio	Ohio
Running mate	Calvin Coolidge	Franklin D. Roosevelt
Electoral vote	4	0
Popular vote	88,975	46,579
Percentage	65.60%	34.34%
County results
Harding
50–60%
60–70%
70–80%
President before election
Woodrow Wilson
Democratic
Elected President
Warren G. Harding
Republican

The 1920 United States presidential election in Idaho took place on November 2, 1920, as part of the 1920 United States presidential election. State voters chose four representatives, or electors, to the Electoral College, who voted for president and vice president.

At state level, Idaho had begun in 1902 to be very much a one-party Republican state, which it has largely remained since apart from the New Deal era of the 1930s and 1940s. For a time there was also a perception that the William Jennings Bryan-led Democratic Party had failed as a “party of reform”.

However, with the aid of a powerful “peace vote” due to opposition to participation in World War I, and a considerable part of the substantial vote for Eugene Debs, Woodrow Wilson almost completely swept the Western and Plains States in 1916, losing only South Dakota and Oregon.

However, the Democratic Party's gains in the West were not to last. By the beginning of 1920 skyrocketing inflation and Wilson's focus upon his proposed League of Nations at the expense of domestic policy had helped make the incumbent president very unpopular – besides which Wilson also had major health problems that had left First Lady Edith effectively running the nation. Political unrest seen in the Palmer Raids and the "Red Scare" further added to the unpopularity of the Democratic Party, since this global political turmoil produced considerable fear of alien revolutionaries invading the country. Demand in the West for exclusion of Asian immigrants became even stronger than before.

With the very strong interior isolationist and anti-League of Nations sentiment of Northern and Central Idaho, and local senator William Borah saying that all wars should be subject to a referendum in September, it was apparent that Idaho would swing very strongly against the pro-League Cox, especially as the extremely independent Borah endorsed Harding on October 3. Cox did make a brief visit to the state in mid-September, The state's opposition to Cox's platform became further apparent when on October 24 the Democratic nominee said he did not accept that Congress should be able to veto presidential calls for war against foreign countries.

As early as the end of August, Harding campaign strategists led by Washington State Senator Miles Poindexter were saying Cox's pro-League policies would lose him the West. a straw poll at the beginning of October vindicated Poindexter: Harding led Cox in Idaho by slightly less than a two-to-one margin. At the end of October, Idaho was described as “absolutely certain” for Harding, and such polls reflected the result. Whereas internationalist GOP nominee Charles Evans Hughes won just five counties in 1916, Harding carried every Idaho county by double digits.

== Results ==
Presidential Candidate	Running Mate	Party	Electoral Vote (EV)	Popular Vote (PV)	
Warren G. Harding	Calvin Coolidge	Republican	4	88,975	65.60%
James M. Cox	Franklin D. Roosevelt	Democratic	0	46,579	34.34%
Eugene V. Debs	Seymour Stedman	Socialist	0	38	0.03%
Aaron S. Watkins	D. Leigh Colvin	Prohibition	0	32	0.02%

=== Results by county ===
County	Warren Gamaliel Harding Republican		James Middleton Cox Democratic		Eugene Victor Debs (Note: Some sources do not list these votes for Debs and Watkins, showing only the two major parties on the ballot) Socialist		Aaron Sherman Watkins Prohibition		Margin		Total votes cast (Note: America at the Polls, p. 117 has different figures from these)
County	#	%	#	%	#	%	#	%	#	%	Total votes cast
Ada	8,419	66.72%	4,173	33.07%	8	0.06%	19	0.15%	4,246	33.65%	12,619
Adams	682	63.62%	390	36.38%	0	0.00%	0	0.00%	292	27.24%	1,072
Bannock	4,871	62.00%	2,986	38.00%	0	0.00%	0	0.00%	1,885	23.99%	7,857
Bear Lake	1,831	61.67%	1,138	38.33%	0	0.00%	0	0.00%	693	23.34%	2,969
Benewah	1,351	62.98%	794	37.02%	0	0.00%	0	0.00%	557	25.97%	2,145
Bingham	3,293	73.55%	1,184	26.45%	0	0.00%	0	0.00%	2,109	47.11%	4,477
Blaine	1,169	67.57%	561	32.43%	0	0.00%	0	0.00%	608	35.14%	1,730
Boise	588	61.19%	373	38.81%	0	0.00%	0	0.00%	215	22.37%	961
Bonner	2,217	60.16%	1,468	39.84%	0	0.00%	0	0.00%	749	20.33%	3,685
Bonneville	3,260	69.67%	1,419	30.33%	0	0.00%	0	0.00%	1,841	39.35%	4,679
Boundary	883	62.71%	525	37.29%	0	0.00%	0	0.00%	358	25.43%	1,408
Butte	646	67.15%	316	32.85%	0	0.00%	0	0.00%	330	34.30%	962
Camas	400	59.08%	276	40.77%	1	0.15%	0	0.00%	124	18.32%	677
Canyon	5,633	62.53%	3,375	37.47%	0	0.00%	0	0.00%	2,258	25.07%	9,008
Caribou	541	74.93%	181	25.07%	0	0.00%	0	0.00%	360	49.86%	722
Cassia	2,690	69.54%	1,178	30.46%	0	0.00%	0	0.00%	1,512	39.09%	3,868
Clark	594	76.25%	184	23.62%	1	0.13%	0	0.00%	410	52.63%	779
Clearwater	947	66.22%	482	33.71%	1	0.07%	0	0.00%	465	32.52%	1,430
Custer	808	67.22%	394	32.78%	0	0.00%	0	0.00%	414	34.44%	1,202
Elmore	1,065	55.12%	867	44.88%	0	0.00%	0	0.00%	198	10.25%	1,932
Franklin	1,612	64.20%	899	35.80%	0	0.00%	0	0.00%	713	28.40%	2,511
Fremont	1,994	65.27%	1,061	34.73%	0	0.00%	0	0.00%	933	30.54%	3,055
Gem	1,404	62.73%	832	37.18%	0	0.00%	2	0.09%	572	25.56%	2,238
Gooding	1,878	70.42%	789	29.58%	0	0.00%	0	0.00%	1,089	40.83%	2,667
Idaho	2,386	67.90%	1,128	32.10%	0	0.00%	0	0.00%	1,258	35.80%	3,514
Jefferson	1,794	70.77%	741	29.23%	0	0.00%	0	0.00%	1,053	41.54%	2,535
Jerome	1,738	68.91%	784	31.09%	0	0.00%	0	0.00%	954	37.83%	2,522
Kootenai	3,518	65.93%	1,818	34.07%	0	0.00%	0	0.00%	1,700	31.86%	5,336
Latah	3,855	71.09%	1,568	28.91%	0	0.00%	0	0.00%	2,287	42.17%	5,423
Lemhi	1,289	64.71%	699	35.09%	4	0.20%	0	0.00%	590	29.62%	1,992
Lewis	1,013	58.49%	712	41.11%	7	0.40%	0	0.00%	301	17.38%	1,732
Lincoln	755	63.87%	427	36.13%	0	0.00%	0	0.00%	328	27.75%	1,182
Madison	1,883	65.79%	979	34.21%	0	0.00%	0	0.00%	904	31.59%	2,862
Minidoka	1,622	59.09%	1,107	40.33%	16	0.58%	0	0.00%	515	18.76%	2,745
Nez Perce	2,761	64.05%	1,548	35.91%	0	0.00%	2	0.05%	1,213	28.14%	4,311
Oneida	1,500	66.61%	752	33.39%	0	0.00%	0	0.00%	748	33.21%	2,252
Owyhee	971	65.34%	515	34.66%	0	0.00%	0	0.00%	456	30.69%	1,486
Payette	1,690	68.04%	785	31.60%	0	0.00%	9	0.36%	905	36.43%	2,484
Power	1,155	67.31%	561	32.69%	0	0.00%	0	0.00%	594	34.62%	1,716
Shoshone	3,112	64.23%	1,733	35.77%	0	0.00%	0	0.00%	1,379	28.46%	4,845
Teton	906	68.90%	409	31.10%	0	0.00%	0	0.00%	497	37.79%	1,315
Twin Falls	5,894	67.16%	2,882	32.84%	0	0.00%	0	0.00%	3,012	34.32%	8,776
Valley	493	60.49%	322	39.51%	0	0.00%	0	0.00%	171	20.98%	815
Washington	1,864	59.59%	1,264	40.41%	0	0.00%	0	0.00%	600	19.18%	3,128
Totals	88,975	65.60%	46,579	34.34%	38	0.03%	32	0.02%	42,396	31.26%	135,624

== See also ==
- United States presidential elections in Idaho
