= 1940 United States presidential election in Idaho =

- November 5, 1940

Nominee	Franklin D. Roosevelt	Wendell Willkie
Party	Democratic	Republican
Home state	New York	New York
Running mate	Henry A. Wallace	Charles L. McNary
Electoral vote	4	0
Popular vote	127,842	106,553
Percentage	54.36%	45.31%
County results
Roosevelt
40–50%
50–60%
60–70%
Willkie
50–60%
60–70%
President before election
Franklin D. Roosevelt
Democratic
Elected President
Franklin D. Roosevelt
Democratic

The 1940 United States presidential election in Idaho took place on November 5, 1940, as part of the 1940 United States presidential election. State voters chose four representatives, or electors, to the Electoral College, who voted for president and vice president.

Idaho was won by incumbent President Franklin D. Roosevelt (D–New York), running with Secretary of Agriculture Henry A. Wallace, with 54.36% of the popular vote, against Wendell Willkie (R–New York), running with Minority Leader Charles L. McNary, with 45.31% of the popular vote.

As of the 2024 presidential election, this is the last occasion when Cassia County, Lemhi County and Owyhee County have voted for a Democratic presidential candidate.

== Results ==
1940 United States presidential election in Idaho
Party	Candidate	Votes	%
Democratic	Franklin D. Roosevelt (inc.)	127,842	54.36%
Republican	Wendell Willkie	106,553	45.31%
Write-in		773	0.33%
Total votes		235,168	100%

=== Results by county ===
County	Franklin Delano Roosevelt Democratic		Wendell Lewis Willkie Republican		Various candidates Write-ins		Margin		Total votes cast
County	#	%	#	%	#	%	#	%	Total votes cast
Ada	12,381	48.95%	12,861	50.85%	51	0.20%	-480	-1.90%	25,293
Adams	929	54.30%	779	45.53%	3	0.18%	150	8.77%	1,711
Bannock	10,493	65.94%	5,419	34.05%	1	0.01%	5,074	31.89%	15,913
Bear Lake	2,026	53.50%	1,761	46.50%			265	7.00%	3,787
Benewah	1,924	59.20%	1,304	40.12%	22	0.68%	620	19.08%	3,250
Bingham	3,815	50.95%	3,662	48.90%	11	0.15%	153	2.04%	7,488
Blaine	1,559	58.02%	1,124	41.83%	4	0.15%	435	16.19%	2,687
Boise	677	58.01%	489	41.90%	1	0.09%	188	16.11%	1,167
Bonner	3,834	55.24%	3,072	44.27%	34	0.49%	762	10.98%	6,940
Bonneville	5,891	59.51%	3,999	40.39%	10	0.10%	1,892	19.11%	9,900
Boundary	1,393	51.90%	1,221	45.49%	70	2.61%	172	6.41%	2,684
Butte	448	51.44%	423	48.56%			25	2.87%	871
Camas	381	50.94%	367	49.06%			14	1.87%	748
Canyon	8,639	49.43%	8,776	50.21%	63	0.36%	-137	-0.78%	17,478
Caribou	658	62.73%	390	37.18%	1	0.10%	268	25.55%	1,049
Cassia	2,930	51.50%	2,748	48.30%	11	0.19%	182	3.20%	5,689
Clark	212	34.70%	399	65.30%			-187	-30.61%	611
Clearwater	2,284	66.61%	1,128	32.90%	17	0.50%	1,156	33.71%	3,429
Custer	894	53.89%	760	45.81%	5	0.30%	134	8.08%	1,659
Elmore	1,632	60.15%	1,077	39.70%	4	0.15%	555	20.46%	2,713
Franklin	2,158	51.05%	2,069	48.95%			89	2.11%	4,227
Fremont	2,556	56.13%	1,996	43.83%	2	0.04%	560	12.30%	4,554
Gem	2,666	64.52%	1,462	35.38%	4	0.10%	1,204	29.14%	4,132
Gooding	1,919	44.89%	2,352	55.02%	4	0.09%	-433	-10.13%	4,275
Idaho	2,888	52.08%	2,641	47.63%	16	0.29%	247	4.45%	5,545
Jefferson	2,631	60.29%	1,717	39.34%	16	0.37%	914	20.94%	4,364
Jerome	1,881	42.67%	2,520	57.17%	7	0.16%	-639	-14.50%	4,408
Kootenai	5,997	57.32%	4,333	41.42%	132	1.26%	1,664	15.91%	10,462
Latah	4,494	52.87%	3,971	46.72%	35	0.41%	523	6.15%	8,500
Lemhi	1,664	54.08%	1,412	45.89%	1	0.03%	252	8.19%	3,077
Lewis	1,462	66.52%	729	33.17%	7	0.32%	733	33.35%	2,198
Lincoln	886	46.58%	1,009	53.05%	7	0.37%	-123	-6.47%	1,902
Madison	2,218	57.60%	1,632	42.38%	1	0.03%	586	15.22%	3,851
Minidoka	1,982	49.87%	1,979	49.80%	13	0.33%	3	0.08%	3,974
Nez Perce	5,963	63.35%	3,409	36.22%	41	0.44%	2,554	27.13%	9,413
Oneida	1,440	55.73%	1,140	44.12%	4	0.15%	300	11.61%	2,584
Owyhee	1,160	52.61%	1,031	46.76%	14	0.63%	129	5.85%	2,205
Payette	1,790	41.02%	2,554	58.52%	20	0.46%	-764	-17.51%	4,364
Power	931	49.39%	951	50.45%	3	0.16%	-20	-1.06%	1,885
Shoshone	6,565	64.54%	3,525	34.65%	82	0.81%	3,040	29.89%	10,172
Teton	844	55.86%	667	44.14%			177	11.71%	1,511
Twin Falls	7,286	44.56%	9,031	55.23%	34	0.21%	-1,745	-10.67%	16,351
Valley	1,165	59.96%	761	39.17%	17	0.87%	404	20.79%	1,943
Washington	2,296	54.61%	1,903	45.27%	5	0.12%	393	9.35%	4,204
Totals	127,842	54.36%	106,553	45.31%	773	0.33%	21,289	9.05%	235,168

==== Counties that flipped from Democratic to Republican ====
- Ada
- Canyon
- Gooding
- Jerome
- Lincoln
- Payette
- Power
- Twins Falls

== See also ==
- United States presidential elections in Idaho
