= 1944 United States presidential election in Idaho =

- November 7, 1944

| Nominee | Franklin D. Roosevelt | Thomas E. Dewey |
| Party | Democratic | Republican |
| Home state | New York | New York |
| Running mate | Harry S. Truman | John W. Bricker |
| Electoral vote | 4 | 0 |
| Popular vote | 107,399 | 100,137 |
| Percentage | 51.55% | 48.07% |
County results
Roosevelt
50–60%
60–70%
Dewey
40–50%
50–60%
60–70%
President before election
Franklin D. Roosevelt
Democratic
Elected President
Franklin D. Roosevelt
Democratic

The 1944 United States presidential election in Idaho took place on November 7, 1944, as part of the 1944 United States presidential election. State voters chose four representatives, or electors, to the Electoral College, who voted for president and vice president.

Idaho was won by incumbent President Franklin D. Roosevelt (D–New York), running with Senator Harry S. Truman, with 51.55% of the popular vote, against Governor Thomas E. Dewey (R–New York), running with Governor John W. Bricker, with 48.07% of the popular vote. This constitutes the last occasion when Franklin County has voted for a Democratic presidential candidate.

== Results ==
1944 United States presidential election in Idaho
| Party | Candidate | Votes | % |
|---|---|---|---|
| Democratic | Franklin D. Roosevelt (inc.) | 107,399 | 51.55% |
| Republican | Thomas E. Dewey | 100,137 | 48.07% |
| Prohibition | Claude A. Watson | 503 | 0.24% |
| Socialist | Norman Thomas | 282 | 0.14% |
| Total votes | | 208,321 | 100.00% |

=== Results by county ===
| County | Franklin Delano Roosevelt Democratic | | Thomas Edmund Dewey Republican | | Claude A. Watson Prohibition | | Norman Mattoon Thomas Socialist | | Margin | | Total votes cast |
| County | # | % | # | % | # | % | # | % | # | % | Total votes cast |
|---|---|---|---|---|---|---|---|---|---|---|---|
| Ada | 10,667 | 44.18% | 13,410 | 55.54% | 41 | 0.17% | 26 | 0.11% | -2,743 | -11.36% | 24,144 |
| Adams | 721 | 52.86% | 642 | 47.07% | 1 | 0.07% | 0 | 0.00% | 79 | 5.79% | 1,364 |
| Bannock | 9,681 | 64.09% | 5,413 | 35.84% | 5 | 0.03% | 6 | 0.04% | 4,268 | 28.26% | 15,105 |
| Bear Lake | 1,732 | 51.75% | 1,613 | 48.19% | 2 | 0.06% | 0 | 0.00% | 119 | 3.56% | 3,347 |
| Benewah | 1,446 | 54.71% | 1,173 | 44.38% | 12 | 0.45% | 12 | 0.45% | 273 | 10.33% | 2,643 |
| Bingham | 3,428 | 51.49% | 3,223 | 48.41% | 4 | 0.06% | 3 | 0.05% | 205 | 3.08% | 6,658 |
| Blaine | 1,037 | 54.12% | 874 | 45.62% | 1 | 0.05% | 4 | 0.21% | 163 | 8.51% | 1,916 |
| Boise | 564 | 54.70% | 464 | 45.00% | 1 | 0.10% | 2 | 0.19% | 100 | 9.70% | 1,031 |
| Bonner | 3,116 | 51.39% | 2,924 | 48.23% | 10 | 0.16% | 13 | 0.21% | 192 | 3.17% | 6,063 |
| Bonneville | 4,935 | 54.84% | 4,048 | 44.98% | 6 | 0.07% | 10 | 0.11% | 887 | 9.86% | 8,999 |
| Boundary | 1,053 | 48.75% | 1,064 | 49.26% | 5 | 0.23% | 38 | 1.76% | -11 | -0.51% | 2,160 |
| Butte | 416 | 49.00% | 431 | 50.77% | 2 | 0.24% | 0 | 0.00% | -15 | -1.77% | 849 |
| Camas | 317 | 51.29% | 301 | 48.71% | 0 | 0.00% | 0 | 0.00% | 16 | 2.59% | 618 |
| Canyon | 7,306 | 43.59% | 9,215 | 54.98% | 208 | 1.24% | 33 | 0.20% | -1,909 | -11.39% | 16,762 |
| Caribou | 516 | 52.76% | 462 | 47.24% | 0 | 0.00% | 0 | 0.00% | 54 | 5.52% | 978 |
| Cassia | 2,325 | 47.49% | 2,563 | 52.35% | 5 | 0.10% | 3 | 0.06% | -238 | -4.86% | 4,896 |
| Clark | 180 | 36.07% | 317 | 63.53% | 2 | 0.40% | 0 | 0.00% | -137 | -27.45% | 499 |
| Clearwater | 1,744 | 66.41% | 865 | 32.94% | 8 | 0.30% | 9 | 0.34% | 879 | 33.47% | 2,626 |
| Custer | 613 | 52.04% | 565 | 47.96% | 0 | 0.00% | 0 | 0.00% | 48 | 4.07% | 1,178 |
| Elmore | 1,627 | 61.00% | 1,030 | 38.62% | 7 | 0.26% | 3 | 0.11% | 597 | 22.38% | 2,667 |
| Franklin | 1,971 | 50.22% | 1,950 | 49.68% | 4 | 0.10% | 0 | 0.00% | 21 | 0.54% | 3,925 |
| Fremont | 2,116 | 54.66% | 1,755 | 45.34% | 0 | 0.00% | 0 | 0.00% | 361 | 9.33% | 3,871 |
| Gem | 1,866 | 57.15% | 1,363 | 41.75% | 36 | 1.10% | 0 | 0.00% | 503 | 15.41% | 3,265 |
| Gooding | 1,659 | 44.64% | 2,049 | 55.14% | 6 | 0.16% | 2 | 0.05% | -390 | -10.50% | 3,716 |
| Idaho | 2,071 | 50.97% | 1,977 | 48.66% | 10 | 0.25% | 5 | 0.12% | 94 | 2.31% | 4,063 |
| Jefferson | 2,198 | 59.97% | 1,458 | 39.78% | 7 | 0.19% | 2 | 0.05% | 740 | 20.19% | 3,665 |
| Jerome | 1,741 | 44.66% | 2,157 | 55.34% | 0 | 0.00% | 0 | 0.00% | -416 | -10.67% | 3,898 |
| Kootenai | 5,792 | 56.66% | 4,388 | 42.93% | 17 | 0.17% | 25 | 0.24% | 1,404 | 13.74% | 10,222 |
| Latah | 3,514 | 49.61% | 3,526 | 49.78% | 32 | 0.45% | 11 | 0.16% | -12 | -0.17% | 7,083 |
| Lemhi | 988 | 48.43% | 1,048 | 51.37% | 2 | 0.10% | 2 | 0.10% | -60 | -2.94% | 2,040 |
| Lewis | 1,222 | 67.48% | 589 | 32.52% | 0 | 0.00% | 0 | 0.00% | 633 | 34.95% | 1,811 |
| Lincoln | 784 | 45.58% | 934 | 54.30% | 2 | 0.12% | 0 | 0.00% | -150 | -8.72% | 1,720 |
| Madison | 1,927 | 55.73% | 1,527 | 44.16% | 3 | 0.09% | 1 | 0.03% | 400 | 11.57% | 3,458 |
| Minidoka | 1,635 | 47.75% | 1,781 | 52.02% | 6 | 0.18% | 2 | 0.06% | -146 | -4.26% | 3,424 |
| Nez Perce | 5,453 | 63.05% | 3,159 | 36.52% | 8 | 0.09% | 29 | 0.34% | 2,294 | 26.52% | 8,649 |
| Oneida | 1,227 | 56.73% | 935 | 43.23% | 1 | 0.05% | 0 | 0.00% | 292 | 13.50% | 2,163 |
| Owyhee | 824 | 45.30% | 983 | 54.04% | 1 | 0.05% | 11 | 0.60% | -159 | -8.74% | 1,819 |
| Payette | 1,382 | 35.57% | 2,485 | 63.96% | 13 | 0.33% | 5 | 0.13% | -1,103 | -28.39% | 3,885 |
| Power | 801 | 47.23% | 895 | 52.77% | 0 | 0.00% | 0 | 0.00% | -94 | -5.54% | 1,696 |
| Shoshone | 5,290 | 62.51% | 3,162 | 37.36% | 1 | 0.01% | 10 | 0.12% | 2,128 | 25.14% | 8,463 |
| Teton | 641 | 53.73% | 552 | 46.27% | 0 | 0.00% | 0 | 0.00% | 89 | 7.46% | 1,193 |
| Twin Falls | 6,128 | 43.41% | 7,946 | 56.29% | 36 | 0.26% | 6 | 0.04% | -1,818 | -12.88% | 14,116 |
| Valley | 896 | 49.26% | 919 | 50.52% | 1 | 0.05% | 3 | 0.16% | -23 | -1.26% | 1,819 |
| Washington | 1,849 | 47.98% | 2,002 | 51.95% | 2 | 0.05% | 1 | 0.03% | -153 | -3.97% | 3,854 |
| Totals | 107,399 | 51.55% | 100,137 | 48.07% | 503 | 0.24% | 282 | 0.14% | 7,262 | 3.49% | 208,321 |

==== Counties that flipped from Democratic to Republican ====
- Boundary
- Butte
- Cassia
- Latah
- Lemhi
- Minidoka
- Owyhee
- Valley
- Washington

== See also ==
- United States presidential elections in Idaho
