= 1928 United States presidential election in Idaho =

- November 6, 1928

Nominee	Herbert Hoover	Al Smith
Party	Republican	Democratic
Home state	California	New York
Running mate	Charles Curtis	Joseph T. Robinson
Electoral vote	4	0
Popular vote	97,322	52,926
Percentage	64.22%	34.93%
County results
Hoover
50–60%
60–70%
70–80%
Smith
50–60%
President before election
Calvin Coolidge
Republican
Elected President
Herbert Hoover
Republican

The 1928 United States presidential election in Idaho took place on November 6, 1928, as part of the 1928 United States presidential election. State voters chose four representatives, or electors, to the Electoral College, who voted for president and vice president.

Idaho was won by Republican candidate Herbert Hoover.

== Results ==
Presidential Candidate	Running Mate	Party	Electoral Vote (EV)	Popular Vote (PV)	
Herbert Hoover of California	Charles Curtis	Republican	4	97,322	64.22%
Al Smith	Joseph T. Robinson	Democratic	0	52,926	34.93%
Norman Thomas	James H. Maurer	Socialist	0	1,293	0.85%

=== Results by county ===
County	Herbert Clark Hoover Republican		Alfred Emmanuel Smith Democratic		Norman Mattoon Thomas Socialist		Margin		Total votes cast
County	#	%	#	%	#	%	#	%	Total votes cast
Ada	10,279	71.84%	3,921	27.40%	108	0.75%	6,358	44.44%	14,308
Adams	521	57.57%	374	41.33%	10	1.10%	147	16.24%	905
Bannock	5,297	53.22%	4,602	46.24%	54	0.54%	695	6.98%	9,953
Bear Lake	1,802	60.98%	1,146	38.78%	7	0.24%	656	22.20%	2,955
Benewah	1,343	57.44%	958	40.98%	37	1.58%	385	16.47%	2,338
Bingham	3,236	64.27%	1,778	35.31%	21	0.42%	1,458	28.96%	5,035
Blaine	849	51.96%	780	47.74%	5	0.31%	69	4.22%	1,634
Boise	521	56.69%	389	42.33%	9	0.98%	132	14.36%	919
Bonner	2,861	63.24%	1,603	35.43%	60	1.33%	1,258	27.81%	4,524
Bonneville	3,218	60.31%	2,110	39.54%	8	0.15%	1,108	20.76%	5,336
Boundary	1,015	61.66%	607	36.88%	24	1.46%	408	24.79%	1,646
Butte	493	61.86%	301	37.77%	3	0.38%	192	24.09%	797
Camas	413	63.25%	230	35.22%	10	1.53%	183	28.02%	653
Canyon	7,293	75.82%	2,187	22.74%	139	1.45%	5,106	53.08%	9,619
Caribou	471	61.49%	291	37.99%	4	0.52%	180	23.50%	766
Cassia	2,388	70.19%	994	29.22%	20	0.59%	1,394	40.98%	3,402
Clark	388	74.90%	129	24.90%	1	0.19%	259	50.00%	518
Clearwater	1,195	57.62%	852	41.08%	27	1.30%	343	16.54%	2,074
Custer	647	55.25%	516	44.06%	8	0.68%	131	11.19%	1,171
Elmore	1,125	59.94%	739	39.37%	13	0.69%	386	20.56%	1,877
Franklin	1,718	58.71%	1,193	40.77%	15	0.51%	525	17.94%	2,926
Fremont	1,674	46.26%	1,933	53.41%	12	0.33%	-259	-7.16%	3,619
Gem	1,656	71.01%	646	27.70%	30	1.29%	1,010	43.31%	2,332
Gooding	1,852	68.87%	821	30.53%	16	0.60%	1,031	38.34%	2,689
Idaho	2,099	55.06%	1,676	43.97%	37	0.97%	423	11.10%	3,812
Jefferson	1,671	55.18%	1,350	44.58%	7	0.23%	321	10.60%	3,028
Jerome	2,050	72.41%	759	26.81%	22	0.78%	1,291	45.60%	2,831
Kootenai	4,973	69.90%	2,020	28.39%	121	1.70%	2,953	41.51%	7,114
Latah	4,472	71.84%	1,681	27.00%	72	1.16%	2,791	44.84%	6,225
Lemhi	1,139	57.12%	837	41.98%	18	0.90%	302	15.15%	1,994
Lewis	1,146	58.35%	793	40.38%	25	1.27%	353	17.97%	1,964
Lincoln	865	70.50%	358	29.18%	4	0.33%	507	41.32%	1,227
Madison	1,670	57.59%	1,228	42.34%	2	0.07%	442	15.24%	2,900
Minidoka	1,832	61.15%	1,132	37.78%	32	1.07%	700	23.36%	2,996
Nez Perce	4,054	61.02%	2,535	38.15%	55	0.83%	1,519	22.86%	6,644
Oneida	1,184	53.55%	1,020	46.13%	7	0.32%	164	7.42%	2,211
Owyhee	918	62.20%	533	36.11%	25	1.69%	385	26.08%	1,476
Payette	2,203	76.23%	621	21.49%	66	2.28%	1,582	54.74%	2,890
Power	852	56.50%	653	43.30%	3	0.20%	199	13.20%	1,508
Shoshone	3,648	59.64%	2,430	39.73%	39	0.64%	1,218	19.91%	6,117
Teton	753	68.27%	348	31.55%	2	0.18%	405	36.72%	1,103
Twin Falls	6,791	72.72%	2,471	26.46%	76	0.81%	4,320	46.26%	9,338
Valley	774	64.77%	407	34.06%	14	1.17%	367	30.71%	1,195
Washington	1,973	66.39%	974	32.77%	25	0.84%	999	33.61%	2,972
Totals	97,322	64.22%	52,926	34.93%	1,293	0.85%	44,396	29.30%	151,541

== See also ==
- United States presidential elections in Idaho
