= 1896 United States presidential election in Idaho =

- November 3, 1896

Nominee	William Jennings Bryan	William McKinley
Party	Democratic	Republican
Alliance	Populist	-
Home state	Nebraska	Ohio
Running mate	Arthur Sewall	Garret Hobart
Electoral vote	3	0
Popular vote	23,135	6,314
Percentage	78.10%	21.32%
County results
Bryan
60–70%
70–80%
80–90%
90–100%
President before election
Grover Cleveland
Democratic
Elected President
William McKinley
Republican

The 1896 United States presidential election in Idaho took place on November 3, 1896. All contemporary 45 states were part of the 1896 United States presidential election. State voters chose three electors to the Electoral College, which selected the president and vice president.

Idaho, upon its organization as a territory was overwhelmingly Democratic, but had been increasingly dominated by the Republican Party in the years leading up to statehood, as ex-Southern and Mormon mining settlers were increasingly outweighed by those from the Midwest. The state Democratic Party would regroup and its pro-silver, anti-Mormon faction under Marshal Fred T. Dubois would bring the state into the Union in the late 1880s.

Upon statehood, Idaho was shaken by a wave of strikes in the silver-mining regions and even deeper conflict whereby an idled ore concentrator was destroyed in Gem. This, alongside opposition to Republican Governor Norman Bushnell Willey’s declaration of martial law upon the miners, and against the absentee ownership of Idaho's land and water, would turn the state's electorate strongly towards the Populist leader James B. Weaver, who carried the state in 1892 in an election where Gold Democrat and former President Grover Cleveland was not even on the ballot.

As the 1896 election approached, it was clear that silver politics would be the determining factor in Idaho's vote, and that the state would not vote for any candidate opposing free silver. Senator Fred T. Dubois, who had been a critical player in giving Idaho statehood, confirmed this in June. When William Jennings Bryan gained the Democratic nomination on a platform favoring the coinage of silver at 16:1 relative to gold, the Populist Party supported him throughout the country.

Idaho was won by the Democratic/Populist nominees, William Jennings Bryan of Nebraska and his running mate Arthur Sewall of Maine. Bryan won the state by a landslide margin of 56.78%. He also won every county, and only in three of twenty-one did McKinley crack a quarter of the vote. Despite half a century of overwhelming Republican dominance, no presidential nominee of either party has ever equaled Bryan's performance in the state. Bryan would later defeat McKinley again in Idaho four years later but would later lose the state to William Howard Taft in 1908. This is one of two elections where the Republican candidate won without the state, the other being in 1900.

== Results ==
1896 United States presidential election in Idaho
Party	Candidate	Votes	Percentage	Electoral votes
Democratic	William Jennings Bryan	23,135	78.10%	3
Republican	William McKinley	6,314	21.32%	0
Prohibition	Joshua Levering	172	0.58%	0
Totals		29,621	100.00%	3
Voter turnout				—

=== Results by county ===
County	William Jennings Bryan Democratic		William McKinley Republican		Joshua Levering Prohibition		Margin		Total votes cast
County	#	%	#	%	#	%	#	%	Total votes cast
Ada	1,531	63.55%	851	35.33%	27	1.12%	680	28.23%	2,409
Bannock	1,363	85.29%	228	14.27%	7	0.44%	1,135	71.03%	1,598
Bear Lake	851	77.29%	249	22.62%	1	0.09%	602	54.68%	1,101
Bingham	1,232	85.56%	194	13.47%	14	0.97%	1,038	72.08%	1,440
Blaine	1,228	95.19%	59	4.57%	3	0.23%	1,169	90.62%	1,290
Boise	862	78.87%	226	20.68%	5	0.46%	636	58.19%	1,093
Canyon	1,178	78.38%	303	20.16%	22	1.46%	875	58.22%	1,503
Cassia	579	81.43%	129	18.14%	3	0.42%	450	63.29%	711
Custer	599	95.08%	29	4.60%	2	0.32%	570	90.48%	630
Elmore	535	81.06%	124	18.79%	1	0.15%	411	62.27%	660
Fremont	1,526	92.21%	121	7.31%	8	0.48%	1,405	84.89%	1,655
Idaho	1,127	74.59%	377	24.95%	7	0.46%	750	49.64%	1,511
Kootenai	1,432	80.49%	334	18.77%	13	0.73%	1,098	61.72%	1,779
Latah	1,870	64.00%	1,036	35.46%	16	0.55%	834	28.54%	2,922
Lemhi	1,065	83.92%	202	15.92%	2	0.16%	863	68.01%	1,269
Lincoln	305	80.26%	74	19.47%	1	0.26%	231	60.79%	380
Nez Perce	1,089	60.97%	675	37.79%	22	1.23%	414	23.18%	1,786
Oneida	1,092	77.23%	315	22.28%	7	0.50%	777	54.95%	1,414
Owyhee	1,140	92.16%	97	7.84%	0	0.00%	1,043	84.32%	1,237
Shoshone	1,760	77.84%	497	21.98%	4	0.18%	1,263	55.86%	2,261
Washington	828	79.62%	204	19.62%	8	0.77%	624	60.00%	1,040
Totals	23,192	78.12%	6,324	21.30%	173	0.58%	16,868	56.82%	29,689

== See also ==
- United States presidential elections in Idaho
