= 1900 United States presidential election in Idaho =

- November 6, 1900

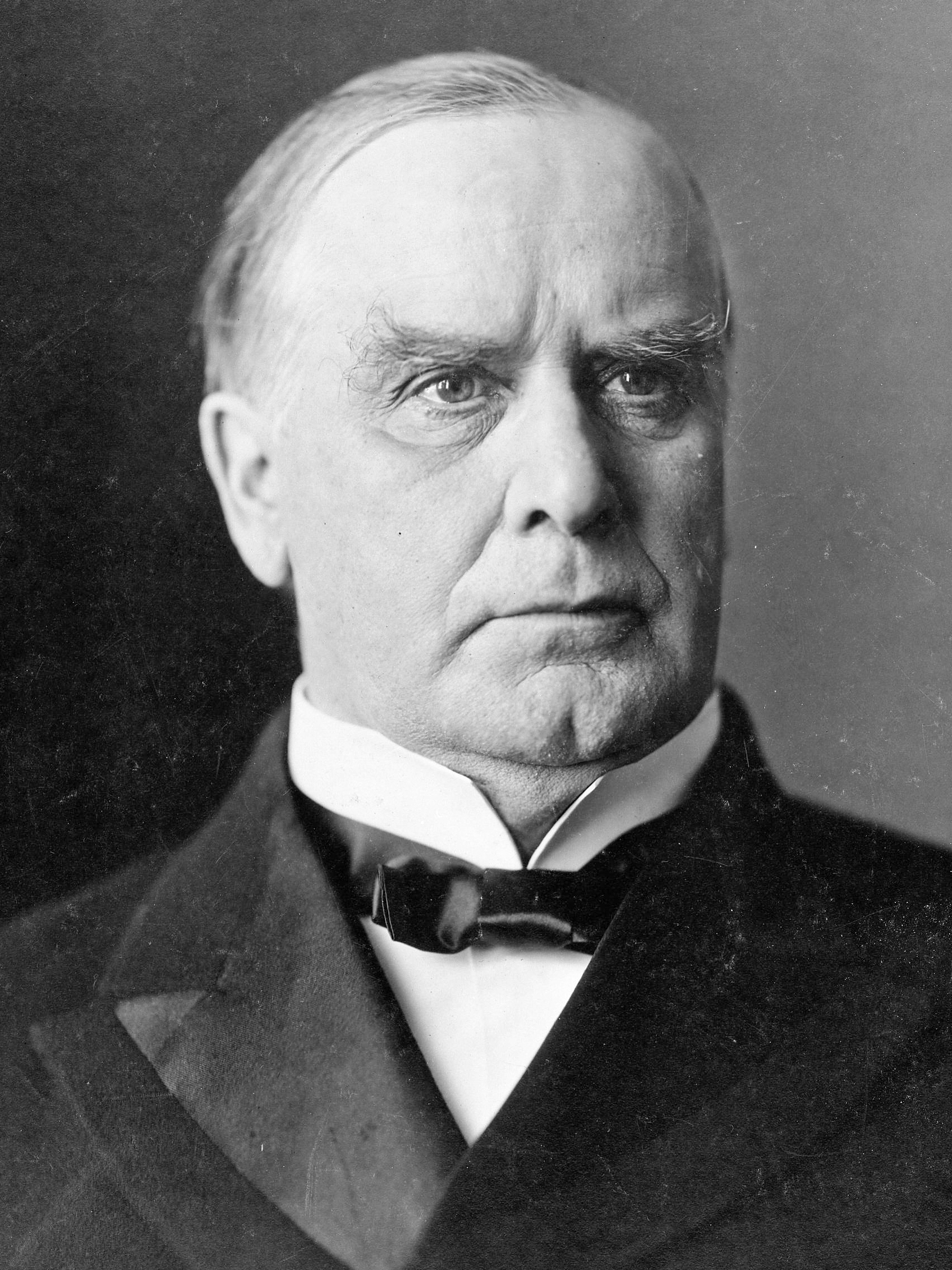
Nominee	William Jennings Bryan	William McKinley
Party	Democratic	Republican
Home state	Nebraska	Ohio
Running mate	Adlai Stevenson I	Theodore Roosevelt
Electoral vote	3	0
Popular vote	29,414	27,198
Percentage	50.79%	46.96%
County results
Bryan
40–50%
50–60%
60–70%
McKinley
40–50%
50–60%
60–70%
President before election
William McKinley
Republican
Elected President
William McKinley
Republican

The 1900 United States presidential election in Idaho took place on November 6, 1900. All contemporary 45 states were part of the 1900 United States presidential election. State voters chose three electors to the Electoral College, which selected the president and vice president.

Idaho was won by the Democratic nominees, William Jennings Bryan of Nebraska and his running mate Adlai Stevenson I of Illinois. Bryan and Stevenson defeated the Republican nominees, incumbent president William McKinley of Ohio and his running mate Theodore Roosevelt of New York. Bryan won the state by a narrow margin of 3.83%.

Bryan had previously defeated McKinley in Idaho four years earlier. He would later lose the state to William Howard Taft in 1908. As of the 2020 election, this is the last election in which the Republican candidate won the presidency without Idaho. This is one of two elections where the Republican candidate won without the state, the other being four years prior in 1896, and by extension marks the only time that a Republican has won reelection without the state.

== Results ==
1900 United States presidential election in Idaho
Party	Candidate	Votes	Percentage	Electoral votes
Democratic	William Jennings Bryan	29,414	50.79%	3
Republican	William McKinley (inc.)	27,198	46.96%	0
Prohibition	John G. Woolley	857	1.48%	0
Populist	Wharton Barker	251	0.02%	0
Totals		57,914	100.00%	3
Voter turnout				—

=== Results by county ===
County	William Jennings Bryan Democratic		William McKinley Republican		John Granville Woolley Prohibition		Wharton Barker Populist		Margin		Total votes cast
County	#	%	#	%	#	%	#	%	#	%	Total votes cast
Ada	2,072	42.02%	2,706	54.88%	133	2.70%	20	0.41%	-634	-12.86%	4,931
Bannock	1,581	47.98%	1,684	51.11%	12	0.36%	18	0.55%	-103	-3.13%	3,295
Bear Lake	1,077	49.72%	1,061	48.98%	14	0.65%	14	0.65%	16	0.74%	2,166
Bingham	1,613	51.93%	1,457	46.91%	25	0.80%	11	0.35%	156	5.02%	3,106
Blaine	1,345	66.55%	634	31.37%	6	0.30%	36	1.78%	711	35.18%	2,021
Boise	852	54.20%	695	44.21%	10	0.64%	15	0.95%	157	9.99%	1,572
Canyon	1,314	45.93%	1,350	47.19%	156	5.45%	41	1.43%	-36	-1.26%	2,861
Cassia	624	47.56%	674	51.37%	5	0.38%	9	0.69%	-50	-3.81%	1,312
Custer	590	68.76%	262	30.54%	4	0.47%	2	0.23%	328	38.23%	858
Elmore	565	58.98%	393	41.02%	0	0.00%	0	0.00%	172	17.95%	958
Fremont	2,153	49.17%	2,174	49.65%	12	0.27%	40	0.91%	-21	-0.48%	4,379
Idaho	1,884	54.00%	1,527	43.77%	29	0.83%	49	1.40%	357	10.23%	3,489
Kootenai	1,871	54.76%	1,472	43.08%	40	1.17%	34	1.00%	399	11.68%	3,417
Latah	2,004	47.30%	2,013	47.51%	168	3.97%	52	1.23%	-9	-0.21%	4,237
Lemhi	897	61.90%	529	36.51%	9	0.62%	14	0.97%	368	25.40%	1,449
Lincoln	355	47.97%	375	50.68%	7	0.95%	3	0.41%	-20	-2.70%	740
Nez Perce	2,168	47.48%	2,184	47.83%	169	3.70%	45	0.99%	-16	-0.35%	4,566
Oneida	1,222	39.25%	1,891	60.75%	0	0.00%	0	0.00%	-669	-21.49%	3,113
Owyhee	884	59.65%	584	39.41%	7	0.47%	7	0.47%	300	20.24%	1,482
Shoshone	2,994	55.37%	2,378	43.98%	20	0.37%	15	0.28%	616	11.39%	5,407
Washington	1,349	51.45%	1,194	45.54%	31	1.18%	48	1.83%	155	5.91%	2,622
Totals	29,414	50.73%	27,237	46.98%	857	1.48%	473	0.82%	2,177	3.75%	57,981

== See also ==
- United States presidential elections in Idaho
