= 1892 United States presidential election in Idaho =

- November 8, 1892
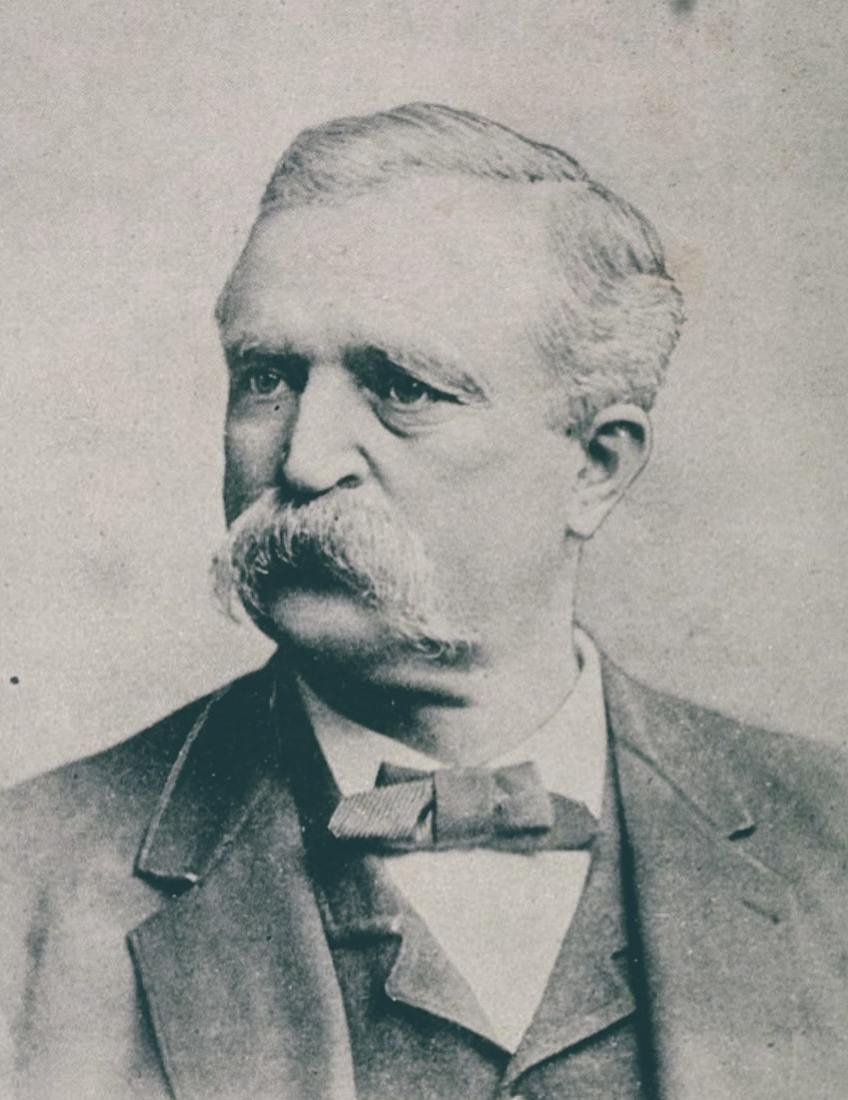

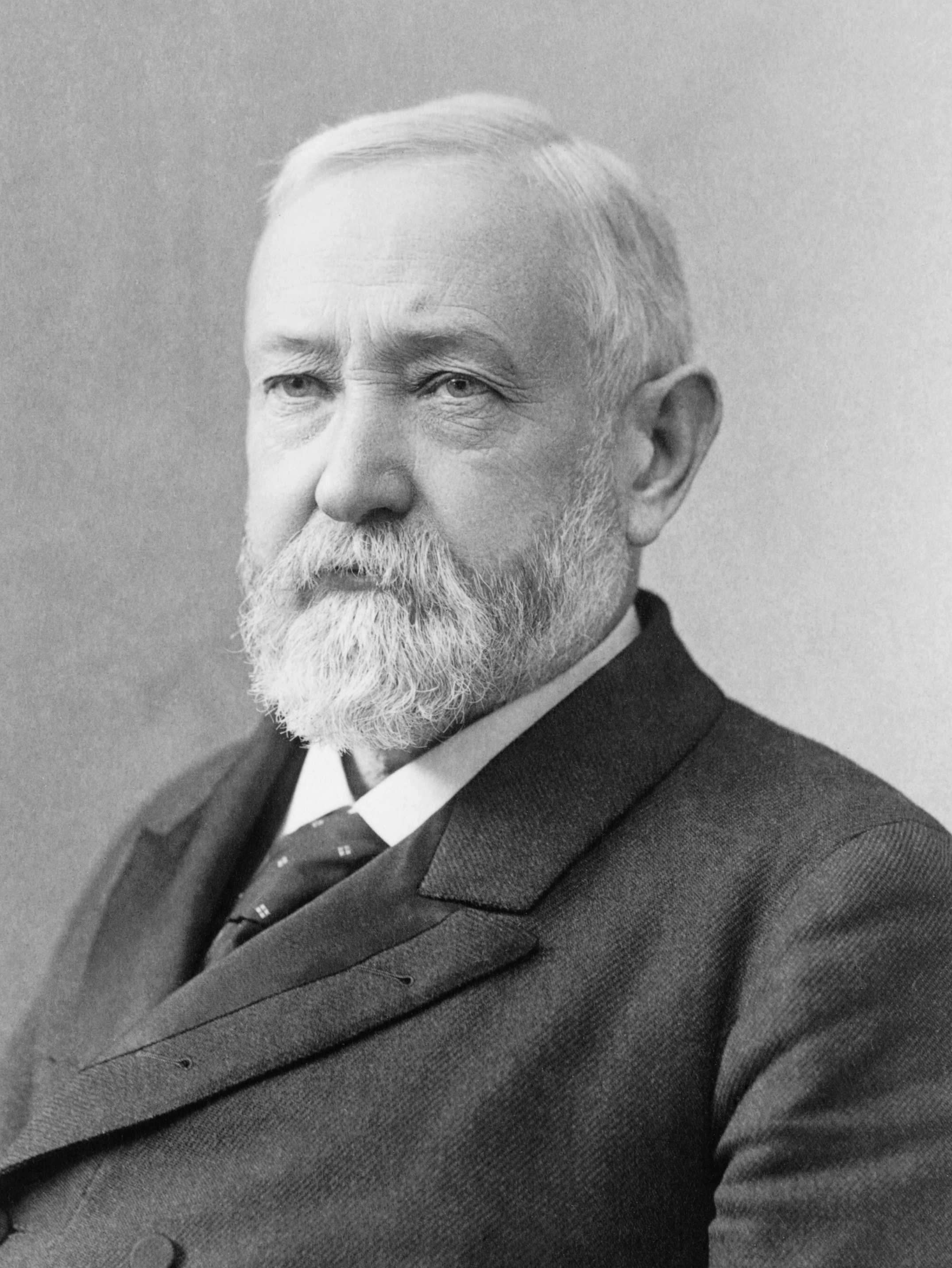
| Nominee | James B. Weaver | Benjamin Harrison |
| Party | Populist | Republican |
| Alliance | Democratic |
| Home state | Iowa | Indiana |
| Running mate | James G. Field | Whitelaw Reid |
| Electoral vote | 3 | 0 |
| Popular vote | 10,520 | 8,599 |
| Percentage | 54.21% | 44.31% |
County results
Weaver
40–50%
50–60%
60–70%
Harrison
40–50%
50–60%
60–70%
President before election
Benjamin Harrison
Republican
Elected President
Grover Cleveland
Democratic

The 1892 United States presidential election in Idaho took place on November 8, 1892. All contemporary 44 states were part of the 1892 United States presidential election. State voters chose three electors to the Electoral College, which selected the president and vice president.

This was the first time Idaho participated in a presidential election, having become the 43rd state on July 3, 1890. During its period as a territory Idaho had been divided between a strongly Republican northern half and an anti-Republican Mormon south, which in this first presidential election was in places (notably Oneida County) still excluded from voting.

A wave of strikes in the silver-mining regions and even deeper conflict whereby an idled ore concentrator was destroyed in Gem, was to give the Populists a grip on the Mountain West that was not to be relinquished. Almost all the large number of dissenting farmers in the new state were to join with the silver interests to back Weaver's policies of nationalization of railways and communications, restriction of immigration, shorter working days and direct election of senators. Although Senator-to-be William Borah campaigned for Harrison under the slogan that “a vote for Weaver was a vote for Cleveland and therefore against their own interests” Weaver's campaign against Republican Governor Norman Bushnell Willey’s declaration of martial law upon the miners, and against the absentee ownership of Idaho's land and water, ensured that these campaigns for Harrison would not be decisive.

Owing to the unpopularity of Grover Cleveland in the West due to his gold standard platform, the Democratic Party decided to not enter a Cleveland ticket in the race and to instead back Weaver. Idaho was won by the Populist nominees, James B. Weaver of Iowa and his running mate James G. Field of Virginia. Weaver and Field defeated the Republican nominees, incumbent President Benjamin Harrison of Indiana and his running mate Whitelaw Reid of New York. Weaver won the state by a margin of 9.9%.

== Results ==
1892 United States presidential election in Idaho
| Party | Candidate | Votes | Percentage | Electoral votes |
|---|---|---|---|---|
| People's/Democratic | James B. Weaver | 10,520 | 54.21% | 3 |
| Republican | Benjamin Harrison (incumbent) | 8,599 | 44.31% | 0 |
| Prohibition | John Bidwell | 288 | 1.48% | 0 |
| Totals | | 19,407 | 100.00% | 3 |
| Voter turnout | | | | — |

=== Results by county ===
| County | Benjamin Harrison Republican | | James Baird Weaver People's/Democratic | | John Bidwell Prohibition | | Margin | | Total votes cast |
| County | # | % | # | % | # | % | # | % | Total votes cast |
|---|---|---|---|---|---|---|---|---|---|
| Ada | 1,170 | 41.39% | 1,597 | 56.49% | 60 | 2.12% | -427 | -15.10% | 2,827 |
| Alturas | 290 | 32.66% | 596 | 67.12% | 2 | 0.23% | -306 | -34.46% | 888 |
| Bear Lake | 114 | 33.93% | 220 | 65.48% | 2 | 0.60% | -106 | -31.55% | 336 |
| Bingham | 937 | 48.35% | 933 | 48.14% | 68 | 3.51% | 4 | 0.21% | 1,938 |
| Boise | 377 | 42.60% | 500 | 56.50% | 8 | 0.90% | -123 | -13.90% | 885 |
| Cassia | 121 | 39.16% | 173 | 55.99% | 15 | 4.85% | -52 | -16.83% | 309 |
| Custer | 187 | 36.45% | 324 | 63.16% | 1 | 0.19% | -137 | -26.71% | 513 (Note: One write-in vote was recorded in this county for Democratic President Grover Cleveland.) |
| Elmore | 188 | 34.81% | 351 | 65.00% | 1 | 0.19% | -163 | -30.19% | 540 |
| Idaho | 386 | 46.01% | 448 | 53.40% | 5 | 0.60% | -62 | -7.39% | 839 |
| Kootenai | 713 | 47.95% | 753 | 50.64% | 21 | 1.41% | -40 | -2.69% | 1,487 |
| Latah | 1,242 | 45.46% | 1,432 | 52.42% | 58 | 2.12% | -190 | -6.95% | 2,732 |
| Lemhi | 330 | 57.39% | 244 | 42.43% | 1 | 0.17% | 86 | 14.96% | 575 |
| Logan | 306 | 36.69% | 518 | 62.11% | 9 | 1.08% | -212 | -25.42% | 834 |
| Nez Perce | 345 | 44.23% | 428 | 54.87% | 7 | 0.90% | -83 | -10.64% | 780 |
| Oneida | 267 | 63.88% | 137 | 32.78% | 14 | 3.35% | 130 | 31.10% | 418 |
| Owyhee | 337 | 49.34% | 340 | 49.78% | 6 | 0.88% | -3 | -0.44% | 683 |
| Shoshone | 936 | 48.95% | 971 | 50.78% | 5 | 0.26% | -35 | -1.83% | 1,912 |
| Washington | 317 | 36.15% | 555 | 63.28% | 5 | 0.57% | -238 | -27.14% | 877 |
| Totals | 8,563 | 44.21% | 10,520 | 54.31% | 288 | 1.49% | -1,957 | -10.10% | 19,371 |

== See also ==
- United States presidential elections in Idaho
