= 2016 United States presidential election in Idaho =

- November 8, 2016
- Turnout: 75.87% ▲

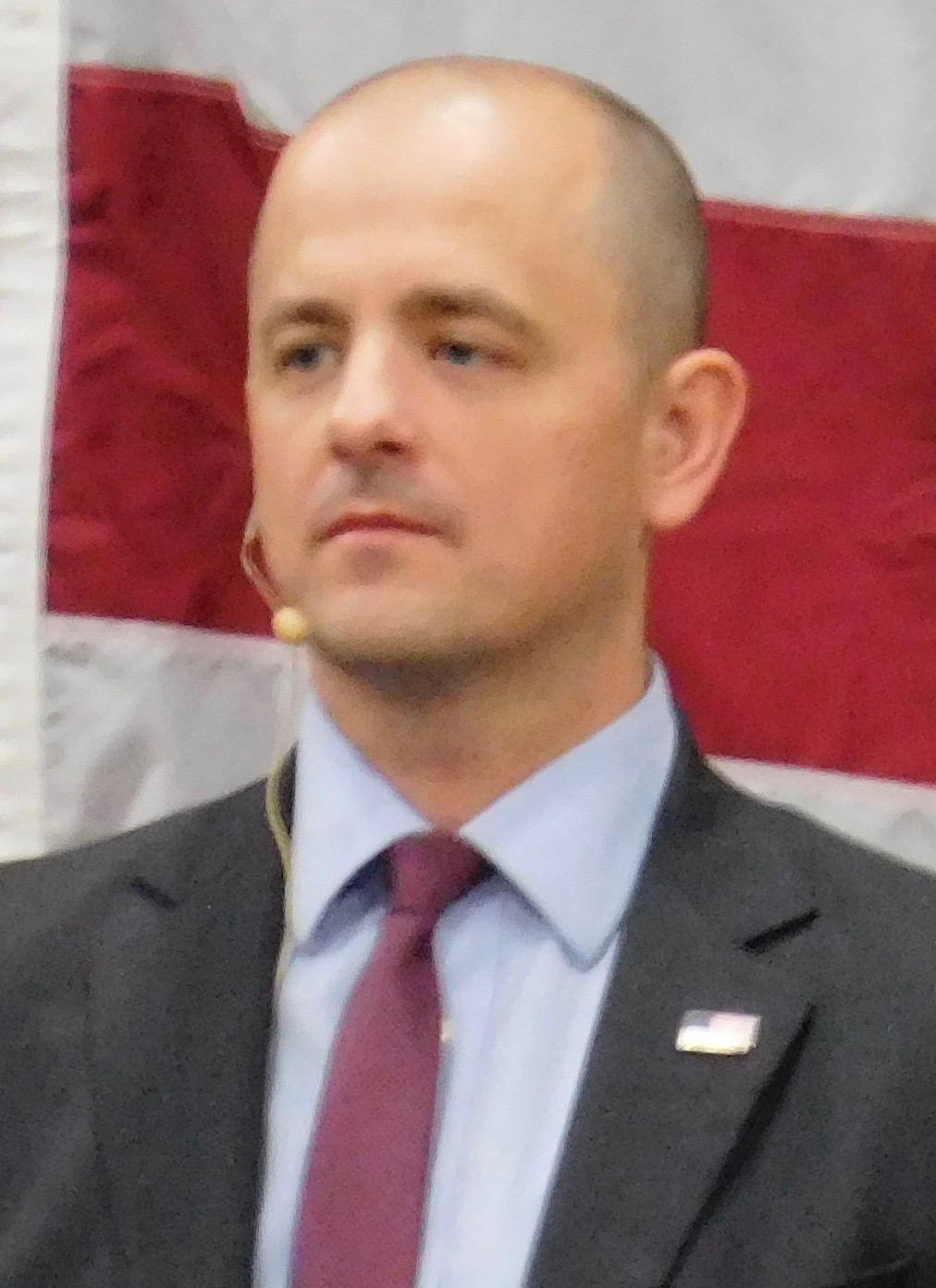
Nominee	Donald Trump	Hillary Clinton	Evan McMullin
Party	Republican	Democratic	Independent
Home state	New York	New York	Utah
Running mate	Mike Pence	Tim Kaine	Nathan Johnson
Electoral vote	4	0	0
Popular vote	409,055	189,765	46,476
Percentage	59.25%	27.48%	6.73%

Trump
40–50%
50–60%
60–70%
70–80%
80–90%
90–100%
Clinton
30–40%
40–50%
50–60%
60–70%
70–80%
Tie/No Data
President before election
Barack Obama
Democratic
Elected President
Donald Trump
Republican

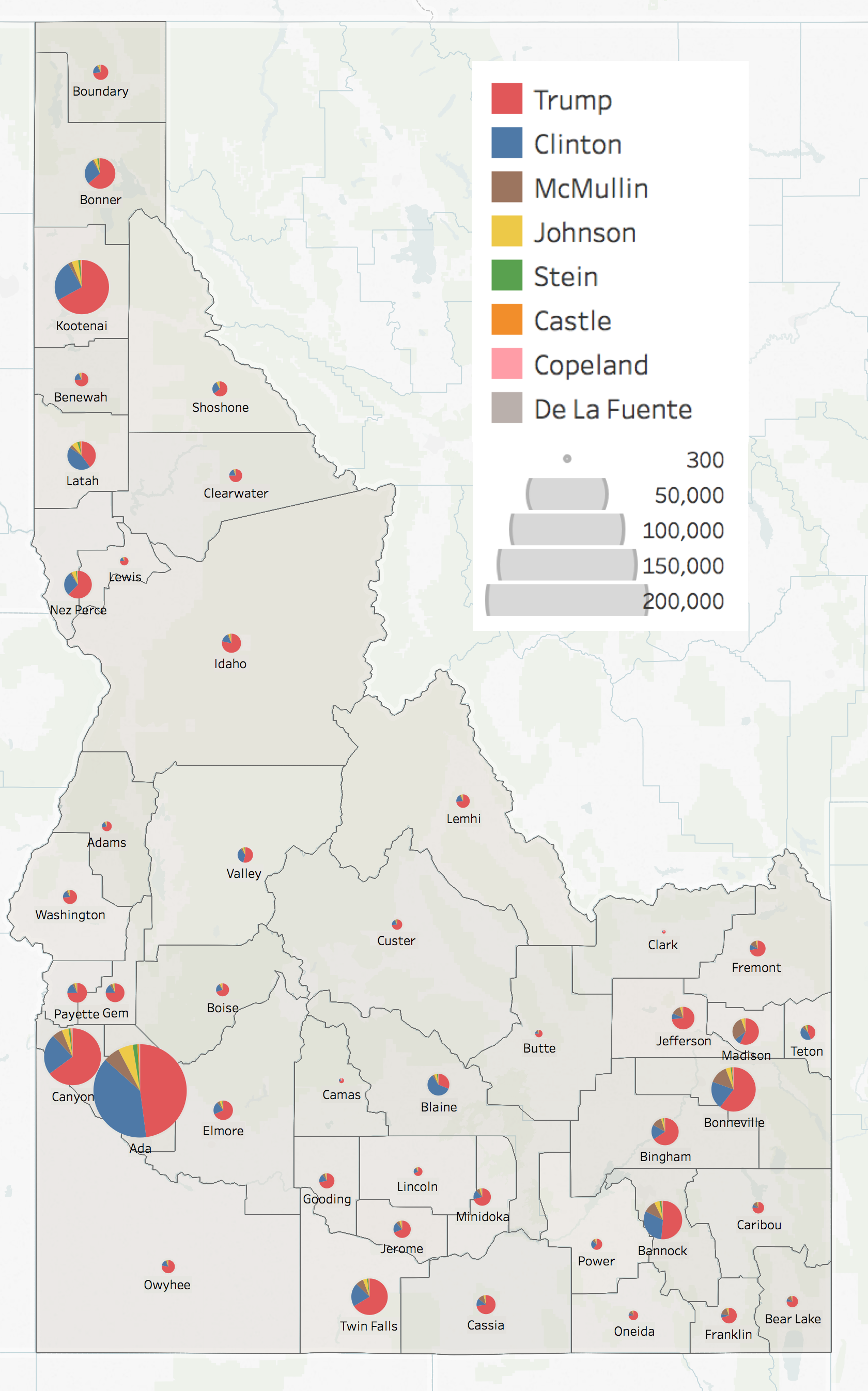
Results by county with number of votes shown by size

Treemap of the popular vote by county

The 2016 United States presidential election in Idaho was held on Tuesday, November 8, 2016, as part of the 2016 United States presidential election in which all 50 states plus the District of Columbia participated. Idaho voters chose electors to represent them in the Electoral College via a popular vote, pitting the Republican nominee, businessman Donald Trump, and running mate Indiana Governor Mike Pence against Democratic Party nominee, former Secretary of State Hillary Clinton, and her running mate Virginia Senator Tim Kaine. Idaho has four electoral votes in the Electoral College.

Trump was expected to win Idaho; Idaho is a Republican stronghold that has not voted for a Democratic candidate for president since Lyndon B. Johnson's national landslide in 1964, and even then it was Johnson's narrowest victory in the nation, winning by less than 2%. Trump ultimately carried the state with 59.25% of the vote, while Clinton received 27.48%. Third-party candidate Evan McMullin carried 6.75% of the popular vote, making Idaho his second-strongest state, only after neighboring Utah. This may have been because McMullin had strong appeal to Mormon voters, with McMullin doing best in the Mormon corridor counties of Idaho.

Trump got the lowest percentage of the vote for a Republican since 1996, and Clinton got the lowest percentage for a Democrat since 1984. As of the 2024 presidential election, this is the last time that Teton County voted Republican.

== Primaries and caucuses ==
=== Republican primary ===
Republican primary results by county Ted Cruz: 30–40%; 40–50%; 50–60%; Donald Trump: 30–40%; 40–50%

Thirteen candidates appeared on the Republican presidential primary ballot. The only requirement to appear on the ballot was a filing fee of $1,000.

Idaho Republican primary, March 8, 2016
Candidate	Votes	Percentage	Actual delegate count		
Candidate	Votes	Percentage	Bound	Unbound	Total
Ted Cruz	100,889	45.44%	20	0	20
Donald Trump	62,413	28.11%	12	0	12
Marco Rubio	35,290	15.90%	0	0	0
John Kasich	16,514	7.44%	0	0	0
Ben Carson (withdrawn)	3,853	1.74%	0	0	0
Jeb Bush (withdrawn)	939	0.42%	0	0	0
Rand Paul (withdrawn)	834	0.38%	0	0	0
Mike Huckabee (withdrawn)	358	0.16%	0	0	0
Chris Christie (withdrawn)	353	0.16%	0	0	0
Carly Fiorina (withdrawn)	242	0.11%	0	0	0
Rick Santorum (withdrawn)	211	0.10%	0	0	0
Lindsey Graham (withdrawn)	80	0.04%	0	0	0
Peter Messina (withdrawn)	28	0.01%	0	0	0
Unprojected delegates:			0	0	0
Total:	222,004	100.00%	32	0	32
Source: The Green Papers

=== Democratic caucuses ===
Results of the Democratic primary by county Bernie Sanders: 50–60%; 60–70%; 70–80%; 80–90%; 100%; Hillary Clinton: 50–60%

2016 Democratic Party's presidential nominating process in Idaho – Summary of results –
Candidate	Popular vote		Estimated delegates		
Candidate	Count	Percentage	Pledged	Unpledged	Total
Bernie Sanders	18,640	78.04%	18	2	20
Hillary Clinton	5,065	21.21%	5	1	6
Rocky De La Fuente	4	0.02%			
Uncommitted	175	0.73%		1	1
Total	23,884	100%	23	4	27

=== Constitution primary ===
The Constitution Party of Idaho held its primary on March 8.

Election results, by county, of the 2016 Constitution presidential primary in Idaho Scott Copeland J.R. Myers Patrick Anthony Ockander Tie No votes

Idaho Constitution Party presidential primary, 2016
Candidate	Popular vote		Pledged delegates
Candidate	Count	Percentage	Pledged delegates
Scott Copeland	250	51.7%	8
J.R. Myers	139	28.7%	0
Patrick Anthony Ockander	95	19.6%	0
Total:	484	100%	8

Key:	Withdrew prior to contest

== General election ==
=== Predictions ===
Source	Ranking	As of
Los Angeles Times	Safe R	November 6, 2016
CNN	Safe R	November 4, 2016
Cook Political Report	Safe R	November 7, 2016
Electoral-vote.com	Safe R	November 8, 2016
Rothenberg Political Report	Safe R	November 7, 2016
Sabato's Crystal Ball	Safe R	November 7, 2016
RealClearPolitics	Safe R	November 8, 2016
Fox News	Safe R	November 7, 2016

=== Results ===
2016 United States presidential election in Idaho
Party	Candidate	Popular vote	Percentage
Republican	Donald Trump	409,055	59.25%
Democratic	Hillary Clinton	189,765	27.48%
Independent	Evan McMullin	46,476	6.73%
Libertarian	Gary Johnson	28,331	4.10%
Green	Jill Stein	8,496	1.23%
National Constitution	Darrell L. Castle	4,403	0.64%
Constitution	Scott Copeland	2,356	0.34%
Reform	Roque De La Fuente	1,373	0.20%
	Other/Write-in	178	0.03%
Total		690,433	100.00%
Source: Idaho Secretary of State Election Division New York Times

==== By county ====
County	Donald Trump Republican		Hillary Clinton Democratic		Evan McMullin Independent		Various candidates Other parties		Margin		Total
County	#	%	#	%	#	%	#	%	#	%	Total
Ada	93,752	47.91%	75,677	38.68%	11,226	5.74%	15,014	7.67%	18,075	9.23%	195,669
Adams	1,556	71.28%	415	19.01%	80	3.66%	132	6.05%	1,141	52.27%	2,183
Bannock	17,180	51.41%	10,342	30.95%	3,449	10.32%	2,445	7.32%	6,838	20.46%	33,416
Bear Lake	2,203	75.24%	255	8.71%	366	12.50%	104	3.55%	1,837 (Note: In counties where McMullin placed second, ahead of Clinton, the Margin given is Trump's vote and percentage minus McMullin's vote and percentage.)	62.74%	2,928
Benewah	3,103	74.15%	770	18.40%	61	1.46%	251	5.99%	2,333	55.75%	4,185
Bingham	10,907	65.61%	2,924	17.59%	2,002	12.04%	792	4.76%	7,983	48.02%	16,625
Blaine	3,340	31.15%	6,416	59.83%	289	2.69%	679	6.33%	-3,076	-28.68%	10,724
Boise	2,673	70.08%	777	20.37%	112	2.94%	252	6.61%	1,896	49.71%	3,814
Bonner	13,343	63.71%	5,819	27.78%	372	1.78%	1,409	6.73%	7,524	35.93%	20,943
Bonneville	26,699	60.38%	8,930	20.19%	6,022	13.62%	2,570	5.81%	17,769	40.19%	44,221
Boundary	3,789	73.39%	933	18.07%	130	2.52%	311	6.02%	2,856	55.32%	5,163
Butte	914	74.31%	160	13.01%	114	9.27%	42	3.41%	754	61.30%	1,230
Camas	410	69.49%	110	18.64%	33	5.59%	37	6.28%	300	50.85%	590
Canyon	47,222	64.88%	16,883	23.20%	4,216	5.79%	4,464	6.13%	30,339	41.68%	72,785
Caribou	2,275	74.96%	271	8.93%	372	12.26%	117	3.85%	1,903	62.70%	3,052
Cassia	5,949	72.74%	1,036	12.67%	853	10.43%	340	4.16%	4,913	60.07%	8,178
Clark	203	71.73%	44	15.55%	23	8.13%	13	4.59%	159	56.18%	283
Clearwater	2,852	75.03%	704	18.52%	72	1.89%	173	4.56%	2,148	56.51%	3,801
Custer	1,777	73.61%	427	17.69%	82	3.40%	128	5.30%	1,350	55.92%	2,414
Elmore	5,816	68.25%	1,814	21.29%	376	4.41%	516	6.05%	4,002	46.96%	8,522
Franklin	3,901	70.94%	385	7.00%	912	16.58%	301	5.48%	2,989	54.36%	5,499
Fremont	4,090	71.57%	651	11.39%	751	13.14%	223	3.90%	3,339	58.43%	5,715
Gem	5,980	75.18%	1,229	15.45%	357	4.49%	388	4.88%	4,751	59.73%	7,954
Gooding	3,743	72.11%	930	17.92%	293	5.64%	225	4.33%	2,813	54.19%	5,191
Idaho	6,441	78.23%	1,196	14.53%	165	2.00%	431	5.24%	5,245	63.70%	8,233
Jefferson	8,436	73.52%	976	8.51%	1,560	13.59%	503	4.38%	6,876	59.93%	11,475
Jerome	4,644	68.79%	1,329	19.69%	419	6.21%	359	5.31%	3,315	49.10%	6,751
Kootenai	44,449	67.03%	16,264	24.53%	1,557	2.35%	4,040	6.09%	28,185	42.50%	66,310
Latah	7,265	39.98%	8,093	44.53%	696	3.83%	2,119	11.66%	-828	-4.55%	18,173
Lemhi	3,011	73.51%	733	17.90%	139	3.39%	213	5.20%	2,278	55.61%	4,096
Lewis	1,202	75.60%	270	16.98%	17	1.07%	101	6.35%	932	58.62%	1,590
Lincoln	1,184	67.73%	360	20.59%	102	5.84%	102	5.84%	824	47.14%	1,748
Madison	8,941	56.99%	1,201	7.66%	4,669	29.76%	877	5.59%	4,272	27.23%	15,688
Minidoka	4,887	71.13%	1,167	16.98%	463	6.74%	354	5.15%	3,720	54.15%	6,871
Nez Perce	10,699	62.20%	4,828	28.07%	352	2.05%	1,322	7.68%	5,871	34.13%	17,201
Oneida	1,531	74.03%	184	8.90%	271	13.10%	82	3.97%	1,260	60.93%	2,068
Owyhee	3,052	77.76%	591	15.06%	108	2.75%	174	4.43%	2,461	62.70%	3,925
Payette	6,489	74.55%	1,507	17.31%	314	3.61%	394	4.53%	4,982	57.24%	8,704
Power	1,666	60.41%	699	25.34%	233	8.45%	160	5.80%	967	35.07%	2,758
Shoshone	3,297	64.39%	1,384	27.03%	87	1.70%	352	6.88%	1,913	37.36%	5,120
Teton	2,167	43.55%	2,159	43.39%	327	6.57%	323	6.49%	8	0.16%	4,976
Twin Falls	19,828	66.37%	6,233	20.86%	2,065	6.91%	3,813	5.86%	13,595	45.51%	29,874
Valley	2,906	54.33%	1,913	35.76%	194	3.63%	326	6.28%	993	18.57%	5,349
Washington	3,283	73.69%	776	17.42%	175	3.93%	221	4.96%	2,507	56.27%	4,455
Totals	409,055	59.25%	189,765	27.48%	46,476	6.73%	45,137	6.54%	219,290	31.77%	690,433

==== By congressional district ====
Trump won both congressional districts.

District	Trump	Clinton	Representative
1st	64%	25%	Raúl Labrador
2nd	54%	30%	Mike Simpson

== See also ==
- United States presidential elections in Idaho
- First presidency of Donald Trump
- 2016 Democratic Party presidential debates and forums
- 2016 Democratic Party presidential primaries
- 2016 Republican Party presidential debates and forums
- 2016 Republican Party presidential primaries
