= 1984 United States presidential election in Idaho =

- November 6, 1984

Nominee	Ronald Reagan	Walter Mondale
Party	Republican	Democratic
Home state	California	Minnesota
Running mate	George H. W. Bush	Geraldine Ferraro
Electoral vote	4	0
Popular vote	297,523	108,510
Percentage	72.36%	26.39%
County results
Reagan
50–60%
60–70%
70–80%
80–90%
90–100%
President before election
Ronald Reagan
Republican
Elected President
Ronald Reagan
Republican

The 1984 United States presidential election in Idaho took place on November 6, 1984. All 50 states and the District of Columbia, were part of the 1984 United States presidential election. State voters chose four electors to the Electoral College, which selected the president and vice president of the United States. Idaho was won by incumbent United States President Ronald Reagan of California, who was running against former Vice President Walter Mondale of Minnesota. Reagan ran for a second time with incumbent Vice President and former C.I.A. Director George H. W. Bush of Texas, and Mondale ran with Representative Geraldine Ferraro of New York, the first major female candidate for the vice presidency.

The presidential election of 1984 was a very partisan election for Idaho, with just under 99 percent of the electorate voting for either the Democratic or Republican parties, and only four parties appearing on the ballot. Every county in the state gave Reagan an outright majority. Reagan's weakest county, and Mondale's best, was Shoshone County, which Reagan won 50.2%-48.3%. It was the only county Reagan did not win by double digits. Reagan's best county was Madison County, which Reagan won 92.9%-6.6%. This was Mondale's worst showing in any county nationwide.

Idaho weighed in for this election as 27.75 percentage points more Republican than the national average and with 72.36 percent of the popular vote, made it Reagan's second strongest state after neighboring Utah.

Reagan won the election in Idaho in a landslide, with a winning margin of 46%. His 72.36% vote share made it his second-best state in the nation, after neighboring Utah. The Mountain West in general had begun trending Republican in 1952, after having been a swing region that was critical for Democrats' hopes of winning the presidency between 1896 and 1948. In Idaho, this happened relatively quickly; in 1964, Barry Goldwater came within less than 2% of carrying Idaho, his closest near-win in the country. However, the trend accelerated, in Idaho and elsewhere, in 1980, as the incumbent president, Jimmy Carter, had been widely perceived as carrying out a 'war on the West' with his water, energy, and development policies. That year, Reagan exceeded the vote shares Eisenhower had received in 1952 and 1956, and that Nixon had received in 1972, in Idaho, despite garnering only a bare majority nationally. In 1984, he improved even further, becoming the first (and thus far, the only) nominee of either party to crack 70% in the state since William Jennings Bryan in 1896.

Reagan exhibited strength throughout Idaho. He got over 60% in all six of its most populous counties--Ada (Boise), Canyon (Nampa), Bonneville (Idaho Falls), Bannock (Pocatello), Kootenai (Coeur d'Alene), and Twin Falls (Twin Falls). In four of the six (including Ada, by far the largest), he got over 70%; and in one (Bonneville), he exceeded 80%. Amongst smaller counties, Reagan did particularly well in heavily Mormon southeast and south central Idaho, winning over 90% of the vote in Madison County (his strongest performance in any county in the country), and over 80% in Jefferson, Franklin, Cassia, Clark, Bear Lake, Caribou, Fremont, Minidoka, and Oneida Counties. However, his strength in the state was broad as well as deep; in only one county (Shoshone) did he fail to run up a double-digit margin over Mondale. Mondale's strength, relatively speaking, was concentrated in and around the Silver Valley region; he was able to break 40% only in Benewah, Latah, Nez Perce, Clearwater, and Shoshone Counties. This election is the most recent election in which the winner won every county in Idaho.

== Results ==
1984 United States presidential election in Idaho
Party	Candidate	Votes	Percentage	Electoral votes
Republican	Ronald Reagan (incumbent)	297,523	72.36%	4
Democratic	Walter Mondale	108,510	26.39%	0
Libertarian	David Bergland	2,823	0.69%	0
America First	Bob Richards	2,288	0.56%	0
Totals		411,144	100.00%	4

=== Results by county ===
County	Ronald Reagan Republican		Walter Mondale Democratic		David Bergland Libertarian		Bob Richards Populist		Margin		Total
County	#	%	#	%	#	%	#	%	#	%	Total
Ada	60,036	72.40%	21,760	26.24%	771	0.93%	357	0.43%	38,276	46.16%	82,924
Adams	1,381	70.60%	540	27.61%	9	0.46%	26	1.33%	841	42.99%	1,956
Bannock	18,742	65.77%	9,399	32.98%	190	0.67%	165	0.58%	9,343	32.79%	28,496
Bear Lake	2,760	84.48%	481	14.72%	7	0.21%	19	0.58%	2,279	69.76%	3,267
Benewah	2,039	57.70%	1,447	40.95%	28	0.79%	20	0.57%	592	16.75%	3,534
Bingham	11,900	78.72%	3,064	20.27%	99	0.65%	53	0.35%	8,836	58.45%	15,116
Blaine	3,603	63.69%	1,971	34.84%	55	0.97%	28	0.49%	1,632	28.85%	5,657
Boise	1,249	72.57%	436	25.33%	22	1.28%	14	0.81%	813	47.24%	1,721
Bonner	6,889	58.89%	4,628	39.56%	72	0.62%	110	0.94%	2,261	19.33%	11,699
Bonneville	24,392	82.71%	4,877	16.54%	120	0.41%	101	0.34%	19,515	66.17%	29,490
Boundary	2,159	63.46%	1,158	34.04%	28	0.82%	57	1.68%	1,001	29.42%	3,402
Butte	1,245	73.89%	429	25.46%	5	0.30%	6	0.36%	816	48.43%	1,685
Camas	364	74.13%	123	25.05%	4	0.81%	0	0.00%	241	49.08%	491
Canyon	24,613	75.53%	7,527	23.10%	275	0.84%	172	0.53%	17,086	52.43%	32,587
Caribou	3,032	84.29%	535	14.87%	11	0.31%	19	0.53%	2,497	69.42%	3,597
Cassia	6,503	85.60%	1,036	13.64%	23	0.30%	35	0.46%	5,467	71.96%	7,597
Clark	353	85.06%	59	14.22%	3	0.72%	0	0.00%	294	70.84%	415
Clearwater	2,176	56.55%	1,608	41.79%	28	0.73%	36	0.94%	568	14.76%	3,848
Custer	1,653	77.10%	461	21.50%	12	0.56%	18	0.84%	1,192	55.60%	2,144
Elmore	4,595	75.27%	1,458	23.88%	19	0.31%	33	0.54%	3,137	51.39%	6,105
Franklin	3,261	87.15%	439	11.73%	15	0.40%	27	0.72%	2,822	75.42%	3,742
Fremont	4,006	82.55%	818	16.86%	13	0.27%	16	0.33%	3,188	65.69%	4,853
Gem	3,644	68.11%	1,607	30.04%	48	0.90%	51	0.95%	2,037	38.07%	5,350
Gooding	3,819	74.60%	1,247	24.36%	21	0.41%	32	0.63%	2,572	50.24%	5,119
Idaho	4,219	66.45%	1,996	31.44%	50	0.79%	84	1.32%	2,223	35.01%	6,349
Jefferson	5,770	87.92%	743	11.32%	21	0.32%	29	0.44%	5,027	76.60%	6,563
Jerome	4,913	78.49%	1,284	20.51%	27	0.43%	35	0.56%	3,629	57.98%	6,259
Kootenai	17,330	64.93%	9,004	33.74%	137	0.51%	218	0.82%	8,326	31.19%	26,689
Latah	7,709	57.10%	5,571	41.27%	151	1.12%	69	0.51%	2,138	15.83%	13,500
Lemhi	2,810	75.78%	852	22.98%	22	0.59%	24	0.65%	1,958	52.80%	3,708
Lewis	1,000	60.02%	648	38.90%	9	0.54%	9	0.54%	352	21.12%	1,666
Lincoln	1,211	74.98%	386	23.90%	8	0.50%	10	0.62%	825	51.08%	1,615
Madison	6,798	92.88%	483	6.60%	15	0.20%	23	0.31%	6,315	86.28%	7,319
Minidoka	5,938	80.03%	1,398	18.84%	41	0.57%	43	0.60%	4,540	61.19%	7,420
Nez Perce	8,153	56.89%	5,981	41.74%	108	0.88%	88	0.71%	2,172	15.15%	14,330
Oneida	1,528	80.51%	360	18.97%	6	0.32%	4	0.21%	1,168	61.54%	1,898
Owyhee	2,141	77.71%	574	20.83%	22	0.80%	18	0.65%	1,567	56.88%	2,755
Payette	4,605	75.23%	1,410	23.04%	53	0.87%	53	0.87%	3,195	52.19%	6,121
Power	2,298	76.50%	678	22.57%	18	0.60%	10	0.33%	1,620	53.93%	3,004
Shoshone	3,156	50.22%	3,033	48.27%	49	0.78%	46	0.73%	123	1.95%	6,284
Teton	1,242	76.48%	370	22.78%	6	0.37%	6	0.37%	872	53.70%	1,624
Twin Falls	16,974	77.97%	4,567	20.98%	145	0.67%	85	0.39%	12,407	56.99%	21,771
Valley	2,299	69.96%	945	28.76%	27	0.82%	15	0.46%	1,354	41.20%	3,286
Washington	3,015	71.99%	1,119	26.72%	30	0.72%	24	0.57%	1,896	45.27%	4,188
Totals	297,523	72.36%	108,510	26.39%	2,823	0.69%	2,288	0.56%	189,013	45.97%	411,144

== See also ==
- United States presidential elections in Idaho
- Presidency of Ronald Reagan
