= 1964 United States presidential election in Idaho =

- November 3, 1964

Nominee	Lyndon B. Johnson	Barry Goldwater
Party	Democratic	Republican
Home state	Texas	Arizona
Running mate	Hubert Humphrey	William E. Miller
Electoral vote	4	0
Popular vote	148,920	143,577
Percentage	50.92%	49.08%
County results
Johnson
50–60%
60–70%
70–80%
Goldwater
50–60%
60–70%
President before election
Lyndon B. Johnson
Democratic
Elected President
Lyndon B. Johnson
Democratic

The 1964 United States presidential election in Idaho took place on November 3, 1964, as part of the 1964 United States presidential election, which was held throughout all 50 states and Washington, D.C. Voters chose four representatives, or electors to the Electoral College, who voted for president and vice president.

Idaho was one of 44 states carried by incumbent President Lyndon B. Johnson amidst his national landslide. However, it was Johnson's narrowest victory in the election. He carried the state by a margin of 5,363 votes, or 1.83%, making Idaho about 20.75% more Republican than the nation. Johnson's strongest performances were in Clearwater and Lewis Counties in the heavily unionized Idaho Panhandle logging country, where he took over 76% of the vote. Goldwater's strongest performance was in ancestrally Republican Jerome County, with 63% of the vote. While Johnson carried slightly over half of the state's 44 counties, Goldwater carried most of the more populous counties (such as Ada, Bonneville, Canyon and Twin Falls), thus keeping the vote close.

As of 2024, this is the only presidential race since 1948 where Idaho voted Democrat, and although Goldwater lost, this election continued the solidification of Idaho as a Republican stronghold. The state trended 13.02% Republican relative to the national swing. Kennedy had lost the state by 7.5% in 1960, but that was in a nearly tied national environment, while Johnson only narrowly won it amidst a 23-point Democratic landslide nationwide. In nine counties, (Note: Idaho counties giving a higher proportion of their vote to Goldwater than Nixon were Butte, Camas, Custer, Gooding, Jefferson, Jerome, Lemhi, Lincoln, and Oneida.) Goldwater earned a higher share of the vote than Richard Nixon had in 1960 – a result observed in only nine other counties outside antebellum slave states. Apart from heavily Catholic Emmons County, North Dakota, Camas and Custer in Idaho were the solitary counties outside antebellum slave states to vote for Kennedy in 1960 and Goldwater in 1964.

No Democratic presidential nominee since Johnson in 1964 has been able to get even 40% of Idaho's popular vote, while the only Republicans to fail to pass 55% have been George H. W. Bush in 1992 and Bob Dole in 1996, in which Ross Perot's and Bo Gritz's third-party candidacies played a part.

== Results ==
Electoral results
Presidential candidate	Party	Home state	Popular vote		Electoral vote	Running mate		
Presidential candidate	Party	Home state	Count	Percentage	Electoral vote	Vice-presidential candidate	Home state	Electoral vote
Lyndon B. Johnson (incumbent)	Democratic	Texas	148,920	50.92%	4	Hubert Humphrey	Minnesota	4
Barry Goldwater	Republican	Arizona	143,557	49.08%	0	William E. Miller	New York	0
Total			292,477	100%	4			4
Needed to win					270			270

=== Results by county ===
County	Lyndon B. Johnson Democratic		Barry Goldwater Republican		Margin		Total votes cast
County	#	%	#	%	#	%	Total votes cast
Ada	19,639	43.60%	25,404	56.40%	-5,765	-12.80%	45,043
Adams	750	52.12%	689	47.88%	61	4.24%	1,439
Bannock	13,483	63.28%	7,825	36.72%	5,658	26.56%	21,308
Bear Lake	1,857	56.86%	1,409	43.14%	448	13.72%	3,266
Benewah	1,796	64.67%	981	35.33%	815	29.34%	2,777
Bingham	5,231	49.37%	5,364	50.63%	-133	-1.26%	10,595
Blaine	1,293	52.69%	1,161	47.31%	132	5.38%	2,454
Boise	450	52.08%	414	47.92%	36	4.16%	864
Bonner	4,328	59.26%	2,975	40.74%	1,353	18.52%	7,303
Bonneville	9,637	47.30%	10,736	52.70%	-1,099	-5.40%	20,373
Boundary	1,418	57.11%	1,065	42.89%	353	14.22%	2,483
Butte	848	56.65%	649	43.35%	199	13.30%	1,497
Camas	258	44.95%	316	55.05%	-58	-10.10%	574
Canyon	10,601	44.05%	13,466	55.95%	-2,865	-11.90%	24,067
Caribou	1,422	52.18%	1,303	47.82%	119	4.36%	2,725
Cassia	2,608	39.41%	4,009	60.59%	-1,401	-21.18%	6,617
Clark	186	41.52%	262	58.48%	-76	-16.96%	448
Clearwater	2,446	76.13%	767	23.87%	1,679	52.26%	3,213
Custer	714	49.79%	720	50.21%	-6	-0.42%	1,434
Elmore	2,310	55.44%	1,857	44.56%	453	10.88%	4,167
Franklin	1,583	39.74%	2,400	60.26%	-817	-20.52%	3,983
Fremont	1,970	50.32%	1,945	49.68%	25	0.64%	3,915
Gem	2,328	54.05%	1,979	45.95%	349	8.10%	4,307
Gooding	1,848	42.24%	2,527	57.76%	-679	-15.52%	4,375
Idaho	3,188	61.57%	1,990	38.43%	1,198	23.14%	5,178
Jefferson	2,061	42.93%	2,740	57.07%	-679	-14.14%	4,801
Jerome	1,828	37.00%	3,113	63.00%	-1,285	-26.00%	4,941
Kootenai	8,215	57.40%	6,096	42.60%	2,119	14.80%	14,311
Latah	5,249	60.17%	3,475	39.83%	1,774	20.34%	8,724
Lemhi	1,067	41.63%	1,496	58.37%	-429	-16.74%	2,563
Lewis	1,557	76.17%	487	23.83%	1,070	52.34%	2,044
Lincoln	617	38.90%	969	61.10%	-352	-22.20%	1,586
Madison	1,949	48.12%	2,101	51.88%	-152	-3.76%	4,050
Minidoka	2,827	47.61%	3,111	52.39%	-284	-4.78%	5,938
Nez Perce	9,245	70.27%	3,912	29.73%	5,333	40.54%	13,157
Oneida	768	40.87%	1,111	59.13%	-343	-18.26%	1,879
Owyhee	1,168	48.99%	1,216	51.01%	-48	-2.02%	2,384
Payette	2,508	47.57%	2,764	52.43%	-256	-4.86%	5,272
Power	1,161	54.58%	966	45.42%	195	9.16%	2,127
Shoshone	5,194	64.30%	2,884	35.70%	2,310	28.60%	8,078
Teton	598	46.98%	675	53.02%	-77	-6.04%	1,273
Twin Falls	7,638	39.87%	11,518	60.13%	-3,880	-20.26%	19,156
Valley	1,126	53.47%	980	46.53%	146	6.94%	2,106
Washington	1,952	53.01%	1,730	46.99%	222	6.02%	3,682
Totals	148,920	50.92%	143,557	49.08%	5,363	1.84%	292,477

==== Counties that flipped from Republican to Democratic ====
- Adams
- Bear Lake
- Boise
- Caribou
- Franklin
- Fremont
- Gem
- Latah
- Power
- Valley
- Washington

==== Counties that flipped from Democratic to Republican ====
- Camas
- Custer

== Analysis ==
At a more local level, the only counties in Idaho to have ever given a Democrat a majority or plurality since 1968 have been the ski resort counties of Teton and Blaine; and Bonner, Shoshone, Clearwater, Lewis, Nez Perce, Latah, and Benewah Counties in the Panhandle logging region. Of these, Bonner County was carried only by a narrow Bill Clinton plurality in 1992. The Republicans would go on to sweep all 44 of Idaho's counties in 1972, 1980, and 1984, and all but one, Blaine County, in 2000 and 2004. Since then, only Blaine, Latah, and Teton Counties have been carried by Democrats, although rapidly-urbanizing Ada County (not carried by Johnson) has become strongly contested for Democrats since the late 2010s.

As a result, this remains the last election in which Kootenai County, Bannock County, Elmore County, Gem County, Idaho County, Fremont County, Boundary County, Washington County, Valley County, Power County, Boise County, Caribou County, Bear Lake County, Adams County, and Butte County voted for a Democratic presidential candidate. This is the last time Democrats won any congressional district in the state.

== See also ==
- United States presidential elections in Idaho
