= Wayan, Idaho =

Unincorporated community in the state of Idaho, United States

Coordinates: 42°58′28″N 111°22′30″W

Wayan is a small unincorporated community in Caribou County, Idaho, United States. It is 35 miles north of Soda Springs on State Highway 34. It is part of a valley known as Grays Lake. The community was named after its first post master and his wife.

== Climate ==
Somsen Ranch is a SNOTEL weather station located near Wayan.

Climate data for Somsen Ranch, Idaho, 1991–2020 normals, 1989-2020 extremes: 6800ft (2073m)
Month	Jan	Feb	Mar	Apr	May	Jun	Jul	Aug	Sep	Oct	Nov	Dec	Year
Record high °F (°C)	55 (13)	59 (15)	68 (20)	75 (24)	83 (28)	89 (32)	94 (34)	91 (33)	86 (30)	79 (26)	65 (18)	53 (12)	94 (34)
Mean maximum °F (°C)	46.2 (7.9)	50.8 (10.4)	59.7 (15.4)	67.2 (19.6)	74.1 (23.4)	81.1 (27.3)	86.4 (30.2)	86.1 (30.1)	80.7 (27.1)	69.9 (21.1)	55.9 (13.3)	45.6 (7.6)	87.6 (30.9)
Mean daily maximum °F (°C)	31.9 (−0.1)	36.0 (2.2)	43.7 (6.5)	49.6 (9.8)	58.3 (14.6)	67.4 (19.7)	77.5 (25.3)	77.0 (25.0)	67.1 (19.5)	52.7 (11.5)	39.0 (3.9)	30.2 (−1.0)	52.5 (11.4)
Daily mean °F (°C)	22.7 (−5.2)	25.2 (−3.8)	32.2 (0.1)	38.1 (3.4)	46.5 (8.1)	54.1 (12.3)	62.4 (16.9)	61.7 (16.5)	53.0 (11.7)	41.2 (5.1)	29.5 (−1.4)	21.7 (−5.7)	40.7 (4.8)
Mean daily minimum °F (°C)	13.5 (−10.3)	14.4 (−9.8)	20.7 (−6.3)	26.5 (−3.1)	34.6 (1.4)	40.7 (4.8)	47.3 (8.5)	46.6 (8.1)	39.0 (3.9)	29.7 (−1.3)	20.1 (−6.6)	13.2 (−10.4)	28.9 (−1.8)
Mean minimum °F (°C)	−6.5 (−21.4)	−4.4 (−20.2)	3.5 (−15.8)	12.9 (−10.6)	23.2 (−4.9)	29.7 (−1.3)	37.4 (3.0)	35.6 (2.0)	26.1 (−3.3)	14.1 (−9.9)	1.0 (−17.2)	−6.7 (−21.5)	−11.9 (−24.4)
Record low °F (°C)	−21 (−29)	−20 (−29)	−16 (−27)	2 (−17)	13 (−11)	24 (−4)	27 (−3)	21 (−6)	17 (−8)	−9 (−23)	−19 (−28)	−28 (−33)	−28 (−33)
Average precipitation inches (mm)	3.15 (80)	2.48 (63)	2.38 (60)	2.51 (64)	2.76 (70)	1.87 (47)	0.79 (20)	1.35 (34)	1.82 (46)	2.23 (57)	2.74 (70)	3.24 (82)	27.32 (693)
Average snowfall inches (cm)	28.3 (72)	24.6 (62)	17.6 (45)	12.5 (32)	4.5 (11)	0.9 (2.3)	0.0 (0.0)	0.0 (0.0)	0.4 (1.0)	6.2 (16)	14.3 (36)	26.0 (66)	135.3 (343.3)
Source 1: XMACIS2 (Wayan 1998-2011 snowfall)
Source 2: NOAA (Precipitation)
