= Conda, Idaho =

Unincorporated community in the state of Idaho, United States

- Unincorporated community
- Location within Idaho Location within the United States
- Coordinates: 42°43′42″N 111°31′57″W
- Country: United States
- State: Idaho
- County: Caribou
- Elevation: 6,195 ft (1,888 m)
- Time zone: UTC-7 (Mountain (MST))
  - Summer (DST): UTC-6 (MDT)
- ZIP code: 83230
- Area codes: 208, 986
- GNIS feature ID: 397567

Conda is an unincorporated community in Caribou County, Idaho, United States. Conda is 6 miles (9.7 km) northeast of Soda Springs. Conda has a post office with ZIP code 83230.

== History ==
Conda's population was estimated at 200 in 1960.

== Climate ==
This climatic region is typified by large seasonal temperature differences, with warm to hot (and often humid) summers and cold (sometimes severely cold) winter. According to the Köppen Climate Classification system, Conda has a humid continental climate, abbreviated "Dfb" on climate maps.
