= Archer, Idaho =

Unincorporated community in the state of Idaho, United States

- Unincorporated community
- Location within Idaho Location within the United States
- Coordinates: 43°42′49″N 111°46′58″W
- Country: United States
- State: Idaho
- County: Madison
- Elevation: 4,918 ft (1,499 m)
- Time zone: UTC-7 (Mountain (MST))
  - Summer (DST): UTC-6 (MDT)
- Area codes: 208, 986
- GNIS feature ID: 397388

Archer is an unincorporated community in Madison County, in the U.S. state of Idaho.

== History ==
A post office called Archer was established in 1902, and remained in operation until 1920. The community was named after the maiden name of Zilpha A. Young.

Archer's population was 250 in 1909, and 50 in 1960.
