= Caribou County, Idaho =

County in Idaho, United States

- County
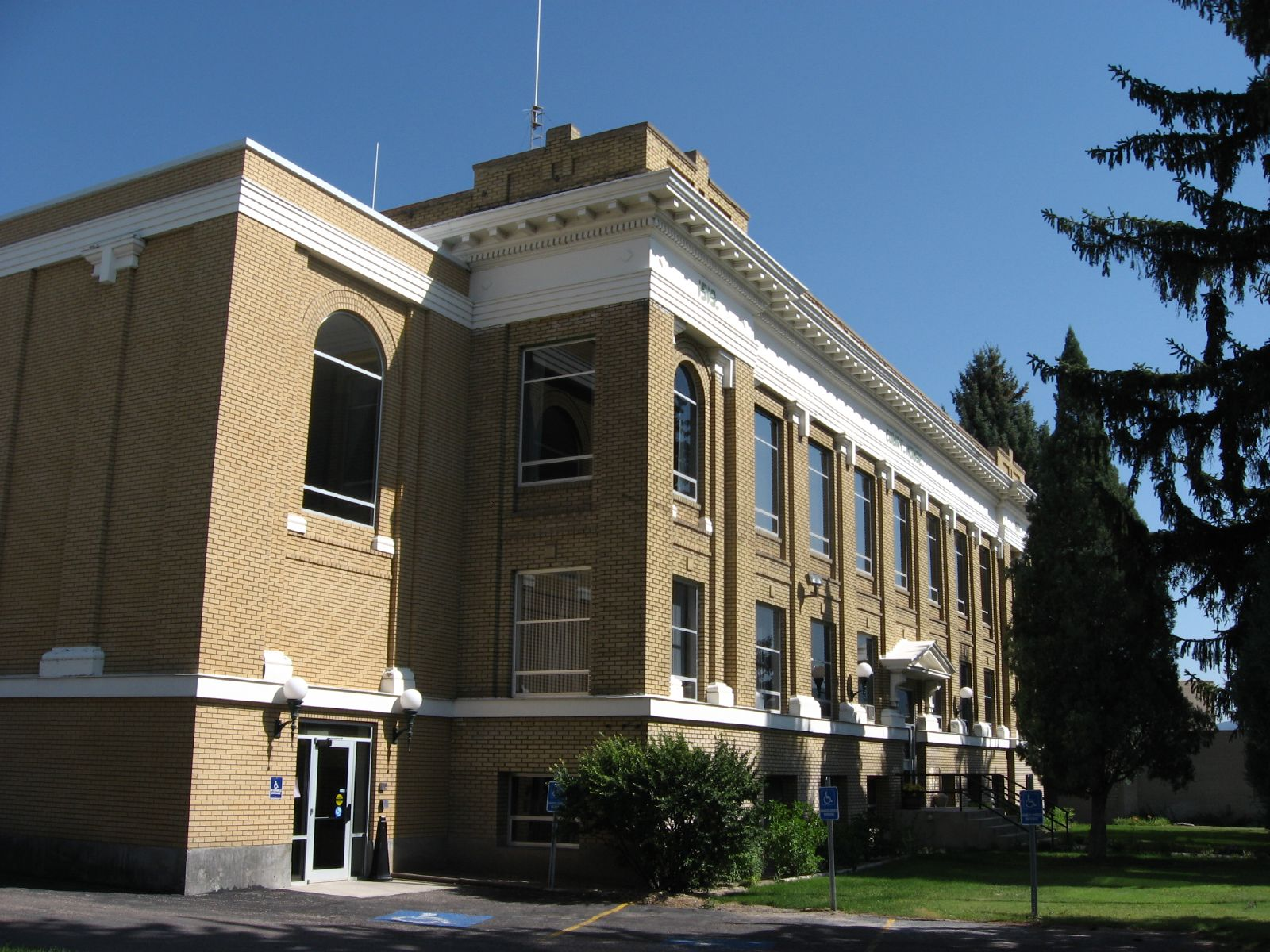
- Caribou County Courthouse, Soda Springs

- Seal

- Location within the U.S. state of Idaho
- Coordinates: 42.76°N 111.55°W
- Country: United States
- State: Idaho
- Founded: February 11, 1919
- Named for: Caribou Range
- Seat: Soda Springs
- Largest city: Soda Springs

Area
  - Total: 1,799 sq mi (4,660 km^{2})
  - Land: 1,764 sq mi (4,570 km^{2})
  - Water: 34 sq mi (88 km^{2}) 1.9%

Population (2020)
  - Total: 7,027
  - Estimate (2025): 7,252 ▲
  - Density: 3.9/sq mi (1.5/km^{2})
- Time zone: UTC−7 (Mountain)
  - Summer (DST): UTC−6 (MDT)
- Congressional district: 2nd
- Website: www.cariboucounty.us

Caribou County is a county located in the U.S. state of Idaho. As of the 2020 Census the county had a population of 7,027. The county seat and largest city is Soda Springs.

== History ==
Robert Stuart explored the area of Soda Springs in 1812. Donald McKenzie also explored the area in 1819. The explorers were followed by trappers, missionaries, and emigrants that would travel through on the Oregon Trail. Soda Springs' namesake springs were an attraction for the trappers who met there to socialize on November 10, 1833. Missionaries and emigrant journal entries describing the springs date back to John K. Townsend's journal entry of July 8, 1834.

In May 1863, members of the Morrisite religious sect took refuge at the junction of Soda Creek and Bear River where they formed Morristown. At the direction of General Patrick E. Conner, a fort was constructed in the fall of 1863 for their protection. Soda Springs was established as the county seat of Oneida County when it was created January 22, 1864, serving as the county seat until 1866. The 1870 census lists a population of 144 for Soda Springs. Settlement of the present town of Soda Springs occurred in May 1871 when Brigham Young and other Mormons purchased land at the present site of Soda Springs. Young would often recreate on his property holdings there.

Settlement in the western portion of the county from Thatcher to Chesterfield was primarily ranching and farming operations up until 1880. Chester Call, Chesterfield's namesake arrived in 1880, bring his family in 1881. The towns of Chesterfield and Squaw Creek Station were settled in 1882. Squaw Creek Station was the initial name for Bancroft that was established when the railroad was built. It was renamed Bancroft on July 23, 1898. Settlement at the town of Grace commenced in 1893. Chesterfield declined in population while Grace and Bancroft endured.

All of present Caribou County became a part of Bingham County when it was created on January 13, 1885. The 1890 census lists four precincts of Chesterfield, Gentile Valley (now Thatcher), Little Blackfoot (now Henry), and Soda Springs with a combined population of 1,722. The Caribou precinct with 342 residents also contained residents within present-day Caribou County, but also included territory now in Bonneville County.

Bannock County was established on March 6, 1893. Bancroft, Chesterfield, Chubb Springs (now Henry), Gentile Valley (now Thatcher), Salt River (now Freedom), and Soda Springs were in existence at the 1900 census with a combined population of 3,430.

When the legislature formed Caribou County on February 11, 1919, Bannock County retained the Gem, Gentile Valley, and Upper Portneuf valleys. The retained area contained 4,486 residents at the 1920 Census, declining to 3,572 residents by the 1940 Census. On January 11, 1948, the residents of this area voted to become part of Caribou County.

== Geography ==
According to the U.S. Census Bureau, the county has a total area of 1,799 square miles (4,660 km^{2}), of which 1,764 square miles (4,570 km^{2}) is land and 34 square miles (88 km^{2}) (1.9%) is water. The county's highpoint is Meade Peak at 9,963 ft (3,037 m) above sea level.

=== Adjacent counties ===
- Bonneville County - north
- Lincoln County, Wyoming - east
- Bear Lake County - south
- Franklin County - south
- Bannock County - west
- Bingham County - northwest

=== National protected areas ===
- Cache National Forest (part)
- Caribou National Forest (part)
- Grays Lake National Wildlife Refuge (part)

=== Major highways ===
- US 30
- SH-34

== Demographics ==
Historical population
Census	Pop.	Note	%±
1920	2,191		—
1930	2,121		−3.2%
1940	2,284		7.7%
1950	5,576		144.1%
1960	5,976		7.2%
1970	6,534		9.3%
1980	8,695		33.1%
1990	6,963		−19.9%
2000	7,304		4.9%
2010	6,963		−4.7%
2020	7,027		0.9%
2025 (est.)	7,252	▲	3.2%
U.S. Decennial Census; 1790–1960, 1900–1990, 1990–2000, 2010–2020 2020

=== Racial and ethnic composition ===
Caribou County, Idaho – Racial and ethnic composition Note: the US Census treats Hispanic/Latino as an ethnic category. This table excludes Latinos from the racial categories and assigns them to a separate category. Hispanics/Latinos may be of any race.
Race / Ethnicity (NH = Non-Hispanic)	Pop 1980	Pop 1990	Pop 2000	Pop 2010	Pop 2020	% 1980	% 1990	% 2000	% 2010	% 2020
White alone (NH)	8,486	6,733	6,929	6,481	6,391	97.60%	96.70%	94.87%	93.08%	90.95%
Black or African American alone (NH)	3	2	3	4	0	0.03%	0.03%	0.04%	0.06%	0.00%
Native American or Alaska Native alone (NH)	37	22	14	19	46	0.43%	0.32%	0.19%	0.27%	0.65%
Asian alone (NH)	7	13	6	14	9	0.08%	0.19%	0.08%	0.20%	0.13%
Native Hawaiian or Pacific Islander alone (NH)	x	x	9	15	15	x	x	0.12%	0.22%	0.21%
Other race alone (NH)	11	1	0	4	14	0.13%	0.01%	0.00%	0.06%	0.20%
Mixed race or Multiracial (NH)	x	x	54	90	168	x	x	0.74%	1.29%	2.39%
Hispanic or Latino (any race)	151	192	289	336	384	1.74%	2.76%	3.96%	4.83%	5.46%
Total	8,695	6,963	7,304	6,963	7,027	100.00%	100.00%	100.00%	100.00%	100.00%

=== 2020 census ===
As of the 2020 census, the county had a population of 7,027. The median age was 37.5 years. 29.3% of residents were under the age of 18 and 17.8% of residents were 65 years of age or older. For every 100 females there were 104.3 males, and for every 100 females age 18 and over there were 105.0 males age 18 and over.

The racial makeup of the county was 92.6% White, 0.0% Black or African American, 0.7% American Indian and Alaska Native, 0.2% Asian, 0.2% Native Hawaiian and Pacific Islander, 2.2% from some other race, and 4.1% from two or more races. Hispanic or Latino residents of any race comprised 5.5% of the population.

0.0% of residents lived in urban areas, while 100.0% lived in rural areas.

There were 2,629 households in the county, of which 35.1% had children under the age of 18 living with them and 18.3% had a female householder with no spouse or partner present. About 24.5% of all households were made up of individuals and 11.9% had someone living alone who was 65 years of age or older.

There were 3,108 housing units, of which 15.4% were vacant. Among occupied housing units, 77.5% were owner-occupied and 22.5% were renter-occupied. The homeowner vacancy rate was 1.2% and the rental vacancy rate was 8.7%.

=== 2010 census ===
As of the 2010 United States census, there were 6,963 people, 2,606 households, and 1,936 families living in the county. The population density was 3.9 inhabitants per square mile (1.5/km^{2}). There were 3,226 housing units at an average density of 1.8 units per square mile (0.69 units/km^{2}). The racial makeup of the county was 95.3% white, 0.3% American Indian, 0.2% Pacific islander, 0.2% Asian, 0.1% black or African American, 2.3% from other races, and 1.5% from two or more races. Those of Hispanic or Latino origin made up 4.8% of the population. In terms of ancestry, 27.5% were English, 17.0% were German, 7.2% were Swedish, 7.0% were Danish, 5.0% were Irish, and 4.3% were American.

Of the 2,606 households, 35.0% had children under the age of 18 living with them, 64.3% were married couples living together, 6.1% had a female householder with no husband present, 25.7% were non-families, and 22.9% of all households were made up of individuals. The average household size was 2.64 and the average family size was 3.12. The median age was 37.7 years.

The median income for a household in the county was $44,958 and the median income for a family was $53,615. Males had a median income of $45,904 versus $23,837 for females. The per capita income for the county was $20,637. About 4.2% of families and 8.4% of the population were below the poverty line, including 10.4% of those under age 18 and 5.0% of those age 65 or over.

=== 2000 census ===
As of the census of 2000, there were 7,304 people, 2,560 households, and 1,978 families living in the county. The population density was 4 people per square mile (1.5 people/km^{2}). There were 3,188 housing units at an average density of 2 units per square mile (0.77 units/km^{2}). The racial makeup of the county was 96.14% White, 0.05% Black or African American, 0.21% Native American, 0.08% Asian, 0.12% Pacific Islander, 2.20% from other races, and 1.19% from two or more races. 3.96% of the population were Hispanic or Latino of any race. 29.7% were of English, 12.2% German, 11.0% American, 8.2% Danish and 5.5% Irish ancestry.

There were 2,560 households, out of which 39.60% had children under the age of 18 living with them, 69.30% were married couples living together, 5.20% had a female householder with no husband present, and 22.70% were non-families. 20.40% of all households were made up of individuals, and 10.30% had someone living alone who was 65 years of age or older. The average household size was 2.83 and the average family size was 3.29.

In the county, the population was spread out, with 31.70% under the age of 18, 8.20% from 18 to 24, 24.50% from 25 to 44, 22.00% from 45 to 64, and 13.60% who were 65 years of age or older. The median age was 35 years. For every 100 females there were 99.20 males. For every 100 females age 18 and over, there were 98.60 males.

The median income for a household in the county was $37,609, and the median income for a family was $42,630. Males had a median income of $38,575 versus $20,085 for females. The per capita income for the county was $15,179. About 7.00% of families and 9.60% of the population were below the poverty line, including 10.60% of those under age 18 and 9.90% of those age 65 or over.

== Communities ==
=== Cities ===
- Bancroft
- Grace
- Soda Springs

=== Unincorporated communities ===
- Conda
- Freedom
- Henry
- Wayan

== Politics ==
Similar to Boise County, Caribou County is a reliable state bellwether, having voted for Idaho's statewide winner in every presidential election since its creation in 1919. Caribou County has been overwhelmingly Republican since the middle 1960s. The last Democrat to carry the county was Lyndon B. Johnson in 1964. In fact, in no presidential election subsequent to that landslide has any Democratic nominee cracked one-third of the county's vote.

United States presidential election results for Caribou County, Idaho
Year	Republican		Democratic		Third party(ies)	
Year	No.	%	No.	%	No.	%
1920	541	74.93%	181	25.07%	0	0.00%
1924	508	58.80%	148	17.13%	208	24.07%
1928	471	61.49%	291	37.99%	4	0.52%
1932	409	44.46%	499	54.24%	12	1.30%
1936	321	33.37%	640	66.53%	1	0.10%
1940	390	37.18%	658	62.73%	1	0.10%
1944	462	47.24%	516	52.76%	0	0.00%
1948	447	48.06%	475	51.08%	8	0.86%
1952	1,788	68.82%	809	31.14%	1	0.04%
1956	1,668	63.71%	950	36.29%	0	0.00%
1960	1,544	54.42%	1,293	45.58%	0	0.00%
1964	1,303	47.82%	1,422	52.18%	0	0.00%
1968	1,731	62.15%	727	26.10%	327	11.74%
1972	2,069	69.95%	614	20.76%	275	9.30%
1976	2,253	64.83%	1,110	31.94%	112	3.22%
1980	3,234	83.09%	481	12.36%	177	4.55%
1984	3,032	84.29%	535	14.87%	30	0.83%
1988	2,239	71.22%	867	27.58%	38	1.21%
1992	1,350	41.72%	562	17.37%	1,324	40.91%
1996	1,740	55.77%	841	26.96%	539	17.28%
2000	2,601	81.87%	475	14.95%	101	3.18%
2004	2,753	83.91%	491	14.96%	37	1.13%
2008	2,656	80.44%	553	16.75%	93	2.82%
2012	2,608	85.45%	386	12.65%	58	1.90%
2016	2,275	74.96%	271	8.93%	489	16.11%
2020	2,906	85.07%	431	12.62%	79	2.31%
2024	2,906	84.09%	445	12.88%	105	3.04%

== See also ==
- National Register of Historic Places listings in Caribou County, Idaho
- County Parcel Map
