= Letha, Idaho =

Unincorporated community in the state of Idaho, United States

- Unincorporated community and census-designated place
- Location within the state of Idaho Letha, Idaho (the United States)
- Coordinates: 43°53′37″N 116°38′43″W
- Country: United States
- State: Idaho
- County: Gem
- Elevation: 2,287 ft (697 m)
- Time zone: UTC-7 (Mountain (MST))
  - Summer (DST): UTC-6 (MDT)
- ZIP codes: 83617
- Area codes: 208, 986
- GNIS feature ID: 2804064

Letha is an unincorporated community and census-designated place in Gem County, Idaho. The community is located 8 mi (13 km) west of Emmett. The Payette River flows northeast of Letha. The population was 161 at the 2020 census.

== History ==
Letha was founded by W.W. Wilton and Colonel Barnard and named for Wilton's daughter, Letha Wilton. It was built approximately midway along the railway running from Emmett to New Plymouth, Idaho, with the anticipation that it would become a major rail center. However, this never occurred; Letha today remains a service center for the adjacent farms and ranches.

Letha's population was estimated at 100 in 1960.

== Utilities and services ==
The community includes a fire department, religious facilities, and manufacturing facilities. Higher education, police, medical, and legal services are found in nearby Emmett.

== Notable people ==
- Pro-Life, farmer and perennial candidate in Idaho politics
