= Thornton, Idaho =

Unincorporated community in Madison County, Idaho, United States

- Unincorporated community
- Location within Idaho Location within the United States
- Coordinates: 43°45′30″N 111°50′43″W
- Country: United States
- State: Idaho
- County: Madison
- Elevation: 4,859 ft (1,481 m)
- Time zone: UTC-7 (Mountain (MST))
  - Summer (DST): UTC-6 (MDT)
- Area codes: 208 and 986
- GNIS feature ID: 398240

Thornton (originally called Texas Siding) is an unincorporated community in Madison County, Idaho, United States, that was founded in 1917.

Thornton was named in honor of William Ezra Thornton, who had been prominent in the establishment of the townsite, and who also was for a time Thornton's postmaster.

== Location ==
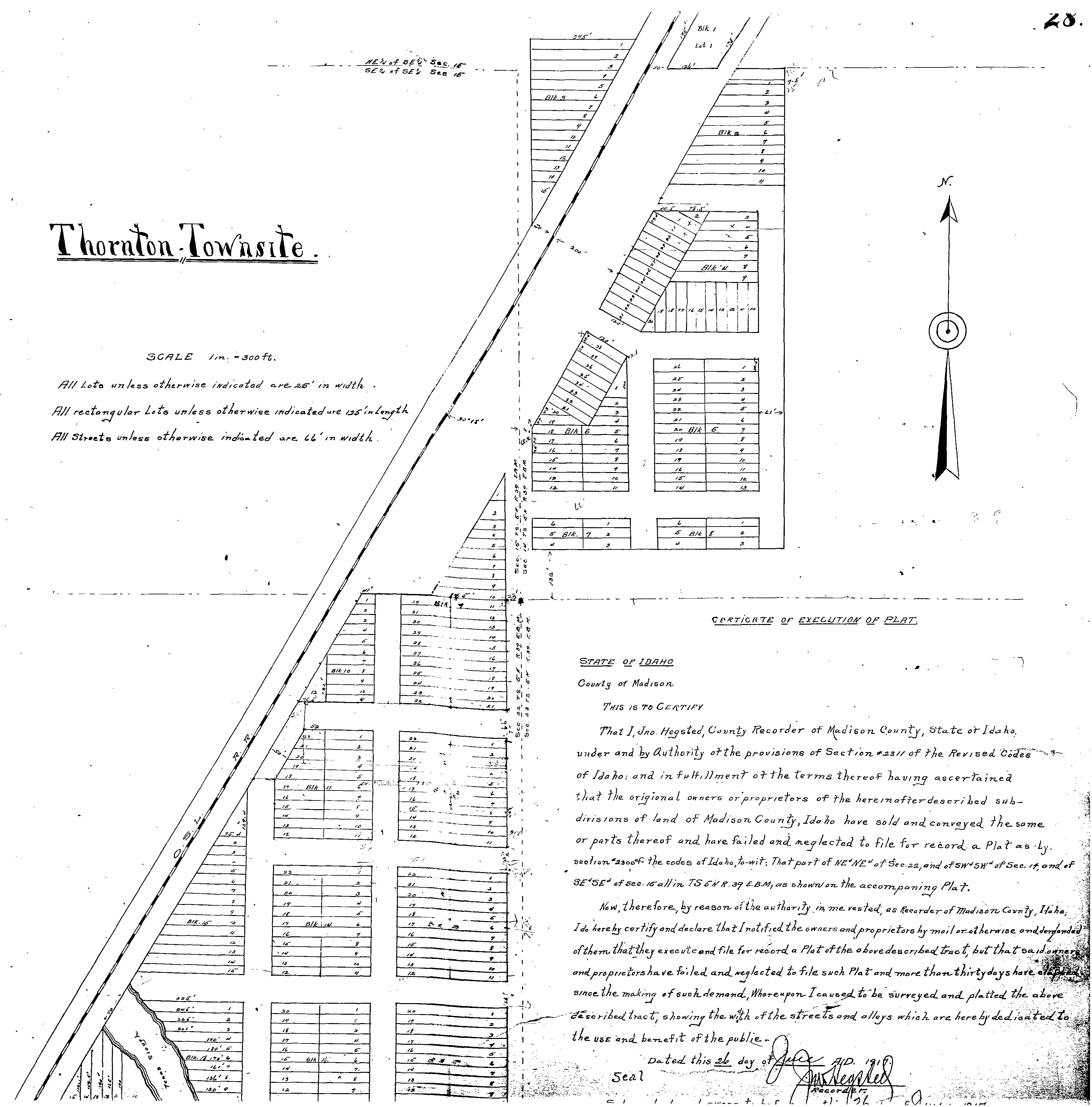
Copy of Certificate of Execution of Plat for Thornton Idaho obtained from Madison County GIS specialist Craig Rindlisbacher

Thornton lies approximately 7 miles (11 km) south of Rexburg, Idaho and is bordered on the south by the Lorenzo Bridge, which crosses over the South Fork of the Snake River. Visible in the near west horizon are the Menan Buttes. Thornton lies on the Oregon Short Line Railroad and was built around what is now a remnant of U.S. Highway 191. This short segment of the original highway terminates within Thornton, at an old cement bridge. Since its original establishment, Thornton has been bisected by the construction of US Highway 20. The larger portion lies south of the highway- the northern portion has been nearly eliminated by the construction of the highway. The Archer-Lyman highway begins to the north and east of Thornton and meanders south and then east towards Ririe, Idaho.

The old brick Thornton Hotel is no longer in operation and has been abandoned due to disrepair.

== History ==
Though Thornton once thrived as "an enterprising center of commerce," Thornton is now primarily a rural community. It is home to a potato warehouse and the original Thornton Merc convenience store.

At one time, Thornton "boasted of two fine general mercantile stores". Thornton's store was owned in the early 1900s by George Marler. A competing store in Thornton was owned by C. L. Galbraith. In 1971 Thornton Merc, which replaced the two prior mercantile stores, was opened at the old Marler's location by Mrs. Geraldine Evans. As of 2010 it is still in operation, and "Marler" can still be seen faintly painted on the north side. Descendants of the Marler family still own property in Thornton.

Thornton was once a place for recreation and amusement, featuring a movie picture house operated by Mr. Fritz Hansen, a saloon, and a dance hall.

In the mid-1940s, The Church of Jesus Christ of Latter-Day Saints (The Church of Jesus Christ) purchased a grain elevator in Thornton from M.G. Koon and Sons. This elevator served to store welfare grain for church stakes until 1959, and can still be seen from U.S. Route 20 for many miles north and south of Thornton.

When Thornton had a train depot, the Yellowstone Park Special passenger train would stop in Thornton on its way to Mack's Inn and Yellowstone Park. Visitors to Heise Hot Springs would arrive by railroad at Thornton and travel by horse-drawn vehicle to the nearby mineral springs.

Thornton once had a community church directed by Reverend Baird. He presided over the church until religious services were discontinued due to insufficient numbers of attendees. The Church of Jesus Christ also supported a primary and Sunday school service in Thornton for a few years. This was also discontinued as the population of Thornton diminished. The Church of Jesus Christ continues to thrive in the nearby area, as expansion of Rexburg has caused commuters including employees and students of Brigham Young University–Idaho to seek available housing in Thornton and surrounding Archer and Lyman.

== Attractions, Landmarks ==
Within Thornton next to the remaining Thornton Merc is an old trailer park which now accommodates both campers and longer-term residents, many of whom are migrant workers who labor in the nearby potato warehouses. Another RV Park lies south across the old concrete bridge nearer to the Snake River South Fork. The Thornton Shell gas station and convenience store lies between Highway 20 and the railroad and used to be known as the Mini Mart. Behind the Shell station is the old grain elevator which now advertises the gas station. Also marooned between the two highways is an older home which was once owned by the Keith Wilcox family in the mid-1900s, which has been stranded now due to the removal of a portion of South 3300 West.
