= Jerome County, Idaho =

County in Idaho, United States

- County
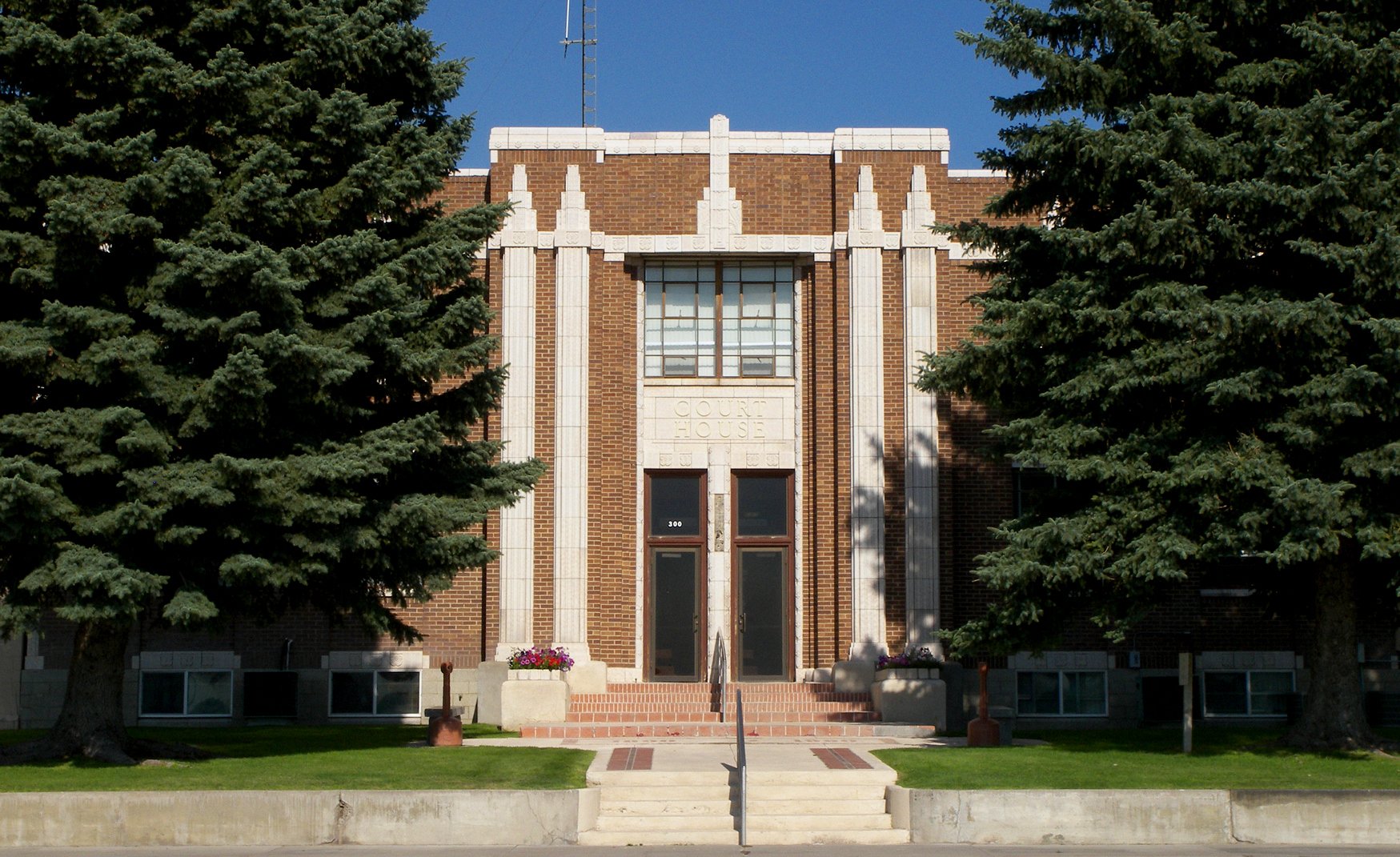
- Jerome County Courthouse

- Seal

- Location within the U.S. state of Idaho
- Coordinates: 42.69°N 114.26°W
- Country: United States
- State: Idaho
- Founded: February 8, 1919
- Seat: Jerome
- Largest city: Jerome

Area
  - Total: 602 sq mi (1,560 km^{2})
  - Land: 597 sq mi (1,550 km^{2})
  - Water: 5.0 sq mi (13 km^{2}) 0.8%

Population (2020)
  - Total: 24,237
  - Estimate (2025): 26,362 ▲
  - Density: 40.6/sq mi (15.7/km^{2})
- Time zone: UTC−7 (Mountain)
  - Summer (DST): UTC−6 (MDT)
- Congressional district: 2nd
- Website: www.jeromecountyid.us

Jerome County is a county in the U.S. state of Idaho. As of the 2020 Census the county had a population of 24,237. The county seat and largest city is Jerome. The county was created by the Idaho Legislature on February 8, 1919, from a partition of Lincoln County. It was named after either Jerome Hill, a developer of the North Side Irrigation Project, his son-in-law Jerome Kuhn, or his grandson Jerome Kuhn Jr. Jerome County is part of the Twin Falls, ID Micropolitan Statistical Area. The Minidoka Relocation Camp, one of ten Japanese American internment camps set up during World War II, was located in Hunt of Jerome County, six miles (9.7 km) north west of Eden.

== History ==
Jerome county's settlements are among Idaho's youngest. While Jerome County was located quite close to the Oregon Trail and subsequent stagecoach lines, it was also divided from them by the 500 ft (150 m) deep Snake River Canyon. The depth of the canyon also eliminated the possibility of drawing water for farming operations. Together, those factors made the area unattractive to early Idahoans looking to settle during the territorial and early statehood era. Construction of the railroad across Idaho in the 1880s also bypassed the Jerome area with the route being run 16 miles (26 km) north of the present center of Jerome City. A ferry commenced operation at Shoshone Falls on April 15, 1884, facilitating travel between the railroad and settlements south of the Snake River.

The Schodde settlement on Jerome County's western border north of Milner was established as the Schoddie Precinct under Lincoln County with a 1900 census population of 24. Completion of the Milner Dam and associated Northside Canal in 1905 brought a water supply to the north side of the Snake River that also brought farmers to the region. Eden and Hazelton were settled starting in 1905. Settlement at Jerome commenced September 30, 1907, and the Idaho Southern Railway reached Jerome on December 28, 1908. By the 1910 Census, Jerome Village contained 970 residents having been incorporated in 1909. Also by that time, Lincoln County established two precincts of Hillsdale (400 residents) and Jerome (2,032 residents). The towns of Eden and Hazelton were part of the Hillsdale precinct and the Schoddie precinct ceased to exist. By the 1920 Census, Eden and Hazelton also were incorporated as villages.

Jerome, Eden, and Hazelton were all part of Lincoln County at their formation. Eden and Hazelton became part of Minidoka County at its creation in 1913. Jerome County became the 43rd of Idaho's 44 counties on February 8, 1911. It is three days older than Caribou County.

== Geography ==
According to the U.S. Census Bureau, the county has a total area of 602 square miles (1,560 km^{2}), of which 597 square miles (1,550 km^{2}) is land and 5.0 square miles (13 km^{2}) (0.8%) is water.

=== Adjacent counties ===
- Lincoln County - north
- Gooding County - west
- Twin Falls County - south
- Cassia County - southeast
- Minidoka County - east

== Demographics ==
Historical population
Census	Pop.	Note	%±
1920	5,729		—
1930	8,358		45.9%
1940	9,900		18.4%
1950	12,080		22.0%
1960	11,712		−3.0%
1970	10,253		−12.5%
1980	14,840		44.7%
1990	15,138		2.0%
2000	18,342		21.2%
2010	22,374		22.0%
2020	24,237		8.3%
2025 (est.)	26,362	▲	8.8%
U.S. Decennial Census; 1790–1960, 1900–1990, 1990–2000, 2010, 2020

=== Racial and ethnic composition ===
Jerome County, Idaho – Racial and ethnic composition Note: the US Census treats Hispanic/Latino as an ethnic category. This table excludes Latinos from the racial categories and assigns them to a separate category. Hispanics/Latinos may be of any race.
Race / Ethnicity (NH = Non-Hispanic)	Pop 1980	Pop 1990	Pop 2000	Pop 2010	Pop 2020	% 1980	% 1990	% 2000	% 2010	% 2020
White alone (NH)	14,137	13,951	14,791	14,958	14,153	95.26%	92.16%	80.64%	66.85%	58.39%
Black or African American alone (NH)	2	9	21	39	39	0.01%	0.06%	0.11%	0.17%	0.16%
Native American or Alaska Native alone (NH)	70	97	103	156	110	0.47%	0.64%	0.56%	0.70%	0.45%
Asian alone (NH)	53	51	49	62	80	0.36%	0.34%	0.27%	0.28%	0.33%
Native Hawaiian or Pacific Islander alone (NH)	x	x	9	12	22	x	x	0.05%	0.05%	0.09%
Other race alone (NH)	12	12	10	21	70	0.08%	0.08%	0.05%	0.09%	0.29%
Mixed race or Multiracial (NH)	x	x	209	197	587	x	x	1.14%	0.88%	2.42%
Hispanic or Latino (any race)	566	1,018	3,150	6,929	9,176	3.81%	6.72%	17.17%	30.97%	37.86%
Total	14,840	15,138	18,342	22,374	24,237	100.00%	100.00%	100.00%	100.00%	100.00%

=== 2020 census ===
As of the 2020 census, the county had a population of 24,237. The median age was 33.4 years. 30.4% of residents were under the age of 18 and 13.7% of residents were 65 years of age or older. For every 100 females there were 105.0 males, and for every 100 females age 18 and over there were 104.4 males age 18 and over.

The racial makeup of the county was 67.7% White, 0.2% Black or African American, 1.8% American Indian and Alaska Native, 0.4% Asian, 0.1% Native Hawaiian and Pacific Islander, 16.2% from some other race, and 13.6% from two or more races. Hispanic or Latino residents of any race comprised 37.9% of the population.

51.2% of residents lived in urban areas, while 48.8% lived in rural areas.

There were 8,098 households in the county, of which 40.1% had children under the age of 18 living with them and 19.8% had a female householder with no spouse or partner present. About 20.0% of all households were made up of individuals and 9.0% had someone living alone who was 65 years of age or older.

There were 8,569 housing units, of which 5.5% were vacant. Among occupied housing units, 68.1% were owner-occupied and 31.9% were renter-occupied. The homeowner vacancy rate was 0.8% and the rental vacancy rate was 3.5%.

=== 2010 census ===
As of the 2010 United States census, there were 22,374 people, 7,540 households, and 5,656 families residing in the county. The population density was 37.5 inhabitants per square mile (14.5/km^{2}). There were 8,101 housing units at an average density of 13.6 per square mile (5.3/km^{2}). The racial makeup of the county was 80.0% white, 1.3% American Indian, 0.3% black or African American, 0.3% Asian, 0.1% Pacific islander, 15.8% from other races, and 2.1% from two or more races. Those of Hispanic or Latino origin made up 31.0% of the population. In terms of ancestry, 16.7% were German, 11.4% were English, 8.8% were American, and 7.0% were Irish.

Of the 7,540 households, 42.5% had children under the age of 18 living with them, 58.7% were married couples living together, 9.6% had a female householder with no husband present, 25.0% were non-families, and 20.3% of all households were made up of individuals. The average household size was 2.95 and the average family size was 3.39. The median age was 31.7 years.

The median income for a household in the county was $39,188 and the median income for a family was $45,947. Males had a median income of $30,889 versus $23,383 for females. The per capita income for the county was $16,947. About 12.0% of families and 15.5% of the population were below the poverty line, including 23.1% of those under age 18 and 7.6% of those age 65 or over.

=== 2000 census ===
As of the census of 2000, there were 18,342 people, 6,298 households, and 4,805 families residing in the county. The population density was 31 inhabitants per square mile (12/km^{2}). There were 6,713 housing units at an average density of 11 per square mile (4.2/km^{2}). The racial makeup of the county was 86.99% White, 0.23% Black or African American, 0.69% Native American, 0.27% Asian, 0.05% Pacific Islander, 9.84% from other races, and 1.94% from two or more races. 17.17% of the population were Hispanic or Latino of any race. 15.4% were of English, 15.3% German, 11.6% American and 6.2% Irish ancestry.

There were 6,298 households, out of which 39.10% had children under the age of 18 living with them, 63.80% were married couples living together, 7.60% had a female householder with no husband present, and 23.70% were non-families. 19.50% of all households were made up of individuals, and 8.70% had someone living alone who was 65 years of age or older. The average household size was 2.89 and the average family size was 3.33.

In the county, the population was spread out, with 31.50% under the age of 18, 8.90% from 18 to 24, 27.10% from 25 to 44, 20.20% from 45 to 64, and 12.30% who were 65 years of age or older. The median age was 33 years. For every 100 females, there were 104.60 males. For every 100 females age 18 and over, there were 104.50 males.

The median income for a household in the county was $34,696, and the median income for a family was $39,083. Males had a median income of $28,036 versus $20,194 for females. The per capita income for the county was $15,530. 13.90% of the population and 10.70% of families were below the poverty line. 17.90% of those under the age of 18 and 9.90% of those 65 and older were living below the poverty line.

== Major highways ==
- Interstate 84
- US 93
- SH-25
- SH-79

== National protected areas ==
- Minidoka National Historic Site

== Communities ==
=== Cities ===
- Eden
- Hazelton
- Jerome

=== Unincorporated communities ===
- Caldron Linn
- Greenwood

== Politics ==
United States presidential election results for Jerome County, Idaho
Year	Republican		Democratic		Third party(ies)	
Year	No.	%	No.	%	No.	%
1920	1,738	68.91%	784	31.09%	0	0.00%
1924	1,117	46.76%	896	37.51%	376	15.74%
1928	2,050	72.41%	759	26.81%	22	0.78%
1932	1,393	37.86%	2,219	60.32%	67	1.82%
1936	1,297	34.33%	2,374	62.84%	107	2.83%
1940	2,520	57.17%	1,881	42.67%	7	0.16%
1944	2,157	55.34%	1,741	44.66%	0	0.00%
1948	2,128	49.43%	2,124	49.34%	53	1.23%
1952	3,807	74.21%	1,318	25.69%	5	0.10%
1956	3,127	64.71%	1,705	35.29%	0	0.00%
1960	3,031	58.49%	2,151	41.51%	0	0.00%
1964	3,113	63.00%	1,828	37.00%	0	0.00%
1968	2,785	60.52%	976	21.21%	841	18.27%
1972	3,661	75.11%	888	18.22%	325	6.67%
1976	3,188	61.81%	1,800	34.90%	170	3.30%
1980	4,962	74.90%	1,368	20.65%	295	4.45%
1984	4,913	78.49%	1,284	20.51%	62	0.99%
1988	3,830	64.32%	1,985	33.33%	140	2.35%
1992	2,972	44.23%	1,739	25.88%	2,009	29.90%
1996	3,358	54.82%	1,679	27.41%	1,088	17.76%
2000	4,418	73.55%	1,360	22.64%	229	3.81%
2004	5,177	78.68%	1,344	20.43%	59	0.90%
2008	4,897	71.52%	1,794	26.20%	156	2.28%
2012	4,804	71.52%	1,699	25.29%	214	3.19%
2016	4,644	68.79%	1,329	19.69%	778	11.52%
2020	5,734	73.14%	1,893	24.15%	213	2.72%
2024	6,012	75.66%	1,742	21.92%	192	2.42%

== Education ==
School districts include:

- Jerome Joint School District 261
- Minidoka County Joint School District 331
- Shoshone Joint School District 312
- Valley School District 262

The county is in the catchment area, and the taxation zone, for College of Southern Idaho.

== See also ==
- National Register of Historic Places listings in Jerome County, Idaho
- USS Jerome County (LST-848)
