= Burton, Idaho =

Unincorporated community in the state of Idaho, United States

- Unincorporated community
- Location within Idaho Location within the United States
- Coordinates: 43°47′51″N 111°51′29″W
- Country: United States
- State: Idaho
- County: Madison
- Elevation: 4,836 ft (1,474 m)
- Time zone: UTC-7 (Mountain (MST))
  - Summer (DST): UTC-6 (MDT)
- Area codes: 208, 986
- GNIS feature ID: 397504

Burton is an unincorporated community in Madison County, in the U.S. state of Idaho.

== History ==
The first settlement at Burton was laid in 1882, by Robert T. Burton. A branch of the Church of Jesus Christ of Latter-Day Saints was organized locally in 1884 with George Foss as Presiding Elder.
