= Madison County, Idaho =

County in Idaho, United States

- County
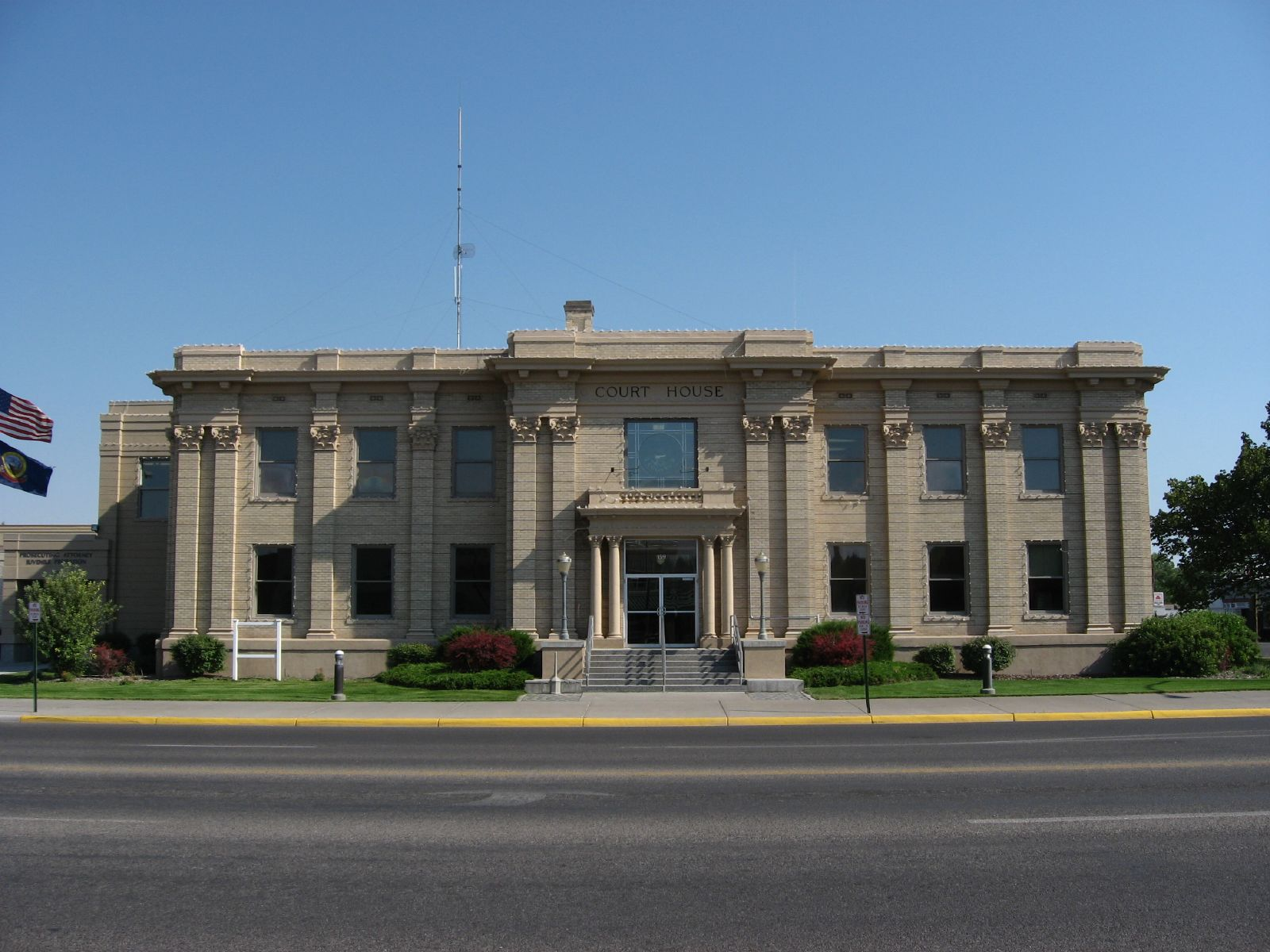
- Madison County Courthouse

- Seal

- Location within the U.S. state of Idaho
- Coordinates: 43°47′N 111°40′W
- Country: United States
- State: Idaho
- Founded: February 18, 1913
- Named for: James Madison
- Seat: Rexburg
- Largest city: Rexburg

Area
  - Total: 473 sq mi (1,230 km^{2})
  - Land: 469 sq mi (1,210 km^{2})
  - Water: 4.0 sq mi (10 km^{2}) 0.8%

Population (2020)
  - Total: 52,913
  - Estimate (2025): 55,172 ▲
  - Density: 113/sq mi (43.6/km^{2})
- Time zone: UTC−7 (Mountain)
  - Summer (DST): UTC−6 (MDT)
- Congressional district: 2nd
- Website: www.madisoncountyid.gov

Madison County is a county located in the U.S. state of Idaho. As of the 2020 census, the population was 52,913. The county seat and largest city is Rexburg. Madison County is part of the Rexburg, Idaho micropolitan area, which is also included in the Idaho Falls-Rexburg-Blackfoot Combined Statistical Area.

== History ==
The area was originally settled by members of the Church of Jesus Christ of Latter-day Saints. Before February 1913, the county was part of neighboring Fremont County. The newly established county was named for American president James Madison. Brigham Young University–Idaho, formerly Ricks College (named after early local LDS settler Thomas Edwin Ricks) is located in Madison County. Madison County was declared a national disaster area after the flood of June 5, 1976.

Madison County is the owner of the healthcare system in the region. However, it is contracted out to Madison Memorial. Madison Memorial began in 1951 when the doctors at that time decided it was time for the community to have a hospital. They then closed their practices and collaborated with the community to build Madison Memorial, a non-profit healthcare system. Since that time, Madison Memorial has continued to grow, promote population health for the region, and provide professional healthcare services for the region with over 800 employees. The region served includes the following counties Jefferson, Madison, Fremont, Teton, Clark, and Lemhi. Madison Memorial is the nearest hospital to Yellowstone National Park.

== Government and politics ==
Similar to other Idaho counties, an elected three-member county commission heads the county government. Other elected officials include clerk, treasurer, sheriff, assessor, coroner, and prosecutor.

With a strongly conservative population, Madison County is one of the most staunchly Republican counties in the United States. Since 1968 no Republican presidential candidate has failed to carry the county with less than 56 percent of the vote, and no Democratic presidential nominee has cracked 23 percent thereof. In that same period Republican presidential candidates polled more than 90 percent of the county's vote on three occasions, Ronald Reagan in 1984, George W. Bush in 2004, and Mitt Romney in 2012. John McCain came close to this level in 2008, drawing 85 percent of the vote. In 2016, Donald Trump won the county, but performed far worse in it than Republicans typically do: he received just 57 percent of the vote, while Romney had received over 93 percent of the vote there just four years earlier. However, this is attributed to the county giving Evan McMullin almost thirty percent of the vote in 2016, which was his best performance of any county in the entire country that year.

In 2020, Trump won 79% of the vote, 22 points up from 2016. However this was still a lower vote share than those achieved by Republican candidates George W Bush in 2000 and 2004, John McCain in 2008 and Mitt Romney in 2012.

Joe Biden won 15.6%, up 7.9% from Hillary Clinton's vote share in 2016. Biden's vote share was the highest for a Democrat in a presidential race in this county since 1996. It was also one of just four times since Lyndon Johnson's 1964 landslide that a Democrat exceeded 15% (the others being the aforementioned 1996, as well as Jimmy Carter in 1976 and Hubert Humphrey in 1968).

At the state level Madison County is located in Legislative District 34, which currently has an all-Republican delegation in the Idaho Legislature.

United States presidential election results for Madison County, Idaho
Year	Republican		Democratic		Third party(ies)	
Year	No.	%	No.	%	No.	%
1916	1,132	44.85%	1,371	54.32%	21	0.83%
1920	1,883	65.79%	979	34.21%	0	0.00%
1924	1,417	53.82%	601	22.83%	615	23.36%
1928	1,670	57.59%	1,228	42.34%	2	0.07%
1932	1,272	37.33%	2,112	61.99%	23	0.68%
1936	1,114	31.01%	2,455	68.35%	23	0.64%
1940	1,632	42.38%	2,218	57.60%	1	0.03%
1944	1,527	44.16%	1,927	55.73%	4	0.12%
1948	1,602	43.93%	2,024	55.50%	21	0.58%
1952	2,756	67.12%	1,348	32.83%	2	0.05%
1956	2,538	64.07%	1,423	35.93%	0	0.00%
1960	2,374	58.59%	1,678	41.41%	0	0.00%
1964	2,101	51.88%	1,949	48.12%	0	0.00%
1968	2,971	67.71%	904	20.60%	513	11.69%
1972	3,606	69.13%	710	13.61%	900	17.25%
1976	4,190	72.38%	1,320	22.80%	279	4.82%
1980	6,555	88.41%	728	9.82%	131	1.77%
1984	6,798	92.88%	483	6.60%	38	0.52%
1988	6,197	84.87%	1,009	13.82%	96	1.31%
1992	4,591	59.14%	741	9.55%	2,431	31.32%
1996	5,706	73.84%	1,216	15.73%	806	10.43%
2000	7,941	88.53%	816	9.10%	213	2.37%
2004	10,693	91.89%	826	7.10%	118	1.01%
2008	11,131	85.24%	1,627	12.46%	300	2.30%
2012	13,445	93.29%	832	5.77%	135	0.94%
2016	8,941	56.99%	1,201	7.66%	5,546	35.35%
2020	13,559	79.12%	2,666	15.56%	912	5.32%
2024	13,925	80.20%	2,767	15.94%	671	3.86%

== Geography ==
According to the U.S. Census Bureau, the county has a total area of 473 square miles (1,230 km^{2}), of which 469 square miles (1,210 km^{2}) is land and 4.0 square miles (10 km^{2}) (0.8%) is water. It is the third-smallest county in Idaho by area.

=== Adjacent counties ===
- Fremont County - north
- Teton County - east
- Bonneville County - south
- Jefferson County - west

=== Major highways ===
- US 20
- SH-33

=== National protected area ===
- Targhee National Forest (part)

== Demographics ==
Historical population
Census	Pop.	Note	%±
1920	9,167		—
1930	8,316		−9.3%
1940	9,186		10.5%
1950	9,156		−0.3%
1960	9,417		2.9%
1970	13,452		42.8%
1980	19,480		44.8%
1990	23,674		21.5%
2000	27,467		16.0%
2010	37,536		36.7%
2020	52,913		41.0%
2025 (est.)	55,172	▲	4.3%
U.S. Decennial Census; 1790–1960, 1900–1990, 1990–2000, 2010–2020 2020

=== Racial and ethnic composition ===
Madison County, Idaho – Racial and ethnic composition Note: the US Census treats Hispanic/Latino as an ethnic category. This table excludes Latinos from the racial categories and assigns them to a separate category. Hispanics/Latinos may be of any race.
Race / Ethnicity (NH = Non-Hispanic)	Pop 1980	Pop 1990	Pop 2000	Pop 2010	Pop 2020	% 1980	% 1990	% 2000	% 2010	% 2020
White alone (NH)	18,832	22,500	25,856	34,218	43,985	96.67%	95.04%	94.13%	91.16%	83.13%
Black or African American alone (NH)	5	35	56	178	709	0.03%	0.15%	0.20%	0.47%	1.34%
Native American or Alaska Native alone (NH)	96	91	68	81	153	0.49%	0.38%	0.25%	0.22%	0.29%
Asian alone (NH)	113	288	153	348	933	0.58%	1.22%	0.56%	0.93%	1.76%
Native Hawaiian or Pacific Islander alone (NH)	x	x	50	51	215	x	x	0.18%	0.14%	0.41%
Other race alone (NH)	41	7	9	43	165	0.21%	0.03%	0.03%	0.11%	0.31%
Mixed race or Multiracial (NH)	x	x	197	399	1,505	x	x	0.72%	1.06%	2.84%
Hispanic or Latino (any race)	393	753	1,078	2,218	5,248	2.02%	3.18%	3.92%	5.91%	9.92%
Total	19,480	23,674	27,467	37,536	52,913	100.00%	100.00%	100.00%	100.00%	100.00%

=== 2020 census ===
As of the 2020 census, the county had a population of 52,913. The median age was 23.1 years. 20.4% of residents were under the age of 18 and 6.1% of residents were 65 years of age or older. For every 100 females there were 98.1 males, and for every 100 females age 18 and over there were 96.4 males age 18 and over.

The racial makeup of the county was 85.6% White, 1.4% Black or African American, 0.5% American Indian and Alaska Native, 1.8% Asian, 0.4% Native Hawaiian and Pacific Islander, 4.8% from some other race, and 5.6% from two or more races. Hispanic or Latino residents of any race comprised 9.9% of the population.

78.1% of residents lived in urban areas, while 21.9% lived in rural areas.

There were 12,700 households in the county, of which 36.9% had children under the age of 18 living with them and 16.2% had a female householder with no spouse or partner present. About 14.0% of all households were made up of individuals and 4.5% had someone living alone who was 65 years of age or older.

There were 14,124 housing units, of which 10.1% were vacant. Among occupied housing units, 43.3% were owner-occupied and 56.7% were renter-occupied. The homeowner vacancy rate was 0.8% and the rental vacancy rate was 12.3%.

=== 2010 census ===
As of the 2010 United States census, there were 37,536 people, 10,611 households, and 7,887 families living in the county. The population density was 80.0 inhabitants per square mile (30.9/km^{2}). There were 11,280 housing units at an average density of 24.0 per square mile (9.3/km^{2}). The racial makeup of the county was 93.9% white, 0.9% Asian, 0.5% Black or African American, 0.3% American Indian, 0.1% Pacific islander, 2.8% from other races, and 1.5% from two or more races. Those of Hispanic or Latino origin made up 5.9% of the population. In terms of ancestry, 35.9% were English, 14.8% were German, 6.0% were Danish, 5.7% were American, and 5.4% were Irish.

Of the 10,611 households, 38.8% had children under the age of 18 living with them, 67.6% were married couples living together, 4.8% had a female householder with no husband present, 25.7% were non-families, and 10.1% of all households were made up of individuals. The average household size was 3.44 and the average family size was 3.42. The median age was 22.6 years.

Madison County had the lowest median household income in the state of Idaho; household in the county was $35,461 and the median income for a family was $41,117. Males had a median income of $38,398 versus $22,440 for females. The per capita income for the county was $13,735. About 21.4% of families and 32.2% of the population were below the poverty line, including 20.9% of those under age 18 and 10.1% of those age 65 or over.

=== 2000 census ===
As of the census of 2000, there were 27,467 people, 7,129 households, and 4,854 families living in the county. The population density was 58 inhabitants per square mile (22/km^{2}). There were 7,630 housing units at an average density of 16 per square mile (6.2/km^{2}). The racial makeup of the county was 95.50% White, 0.24% Black or African American, 0.33% Native American, 0.57% Asian, 0.18% Pacific Islander, 2.23% from other races, and 0.95% from two or more races. 3.92% of the population were Hispanic or Latino of any race. 30.6% were of English, 10.7% German, 10.2% American and 5.3% Danish ancestry.

There were 7,129 households, out of which 39.00% had children under the age of 18 living with them, 60.10% were married couples living together, 5.70% had a female householder with no husband present, and 31.90% were non-families. 12.70% of all households were made up of individuals, and 5.60% had someone living alone who was 65 years of age or older. The average household size was 3.66 and the average family size was 3.70.

In the county, the population was spread out, with 26.20% under the age of 18, 39.90% from 18 to 24, 16.00% from 25 to 44, 11.90% from 45 to 64, and 6.00% who were 65 years of age or older. The median age was 21 years. For every 100 females, there were 90.90 males. For every 100 females age 18 and over, there were 83.60 males.

The median income for a household in the county was $32,607, and the median income for a family was $40,880. Males had a median income of $29,299 versus $18,628 for females. The per capita income for the county was $10,956. About 10.10% of families and 30.50% of the population were below the poverty line, including 11.70% of those under age 18 and 10.10% of those age 65 or over.

== Communities ==
=== Cities ===
- Rexburg
- Sugar City

=== Unincorporated communities ===
- Archer
- Burton
- Thornton
- Hibbard

== Education ==
School districts include:

- Fremont County Joint School District 215
- Jefferson County Joint School District 251
- Madison School District 321
- Sugar-Salem Joint School District 322

College of Eastern Idaho includes this county in its catchment zone; however this county is not in its taxation zone.

== See also ==
- National Register of Historic Places listings in Madison County, Idaho
