= Gem County, Idaho =

County in Idaho, United States

- County
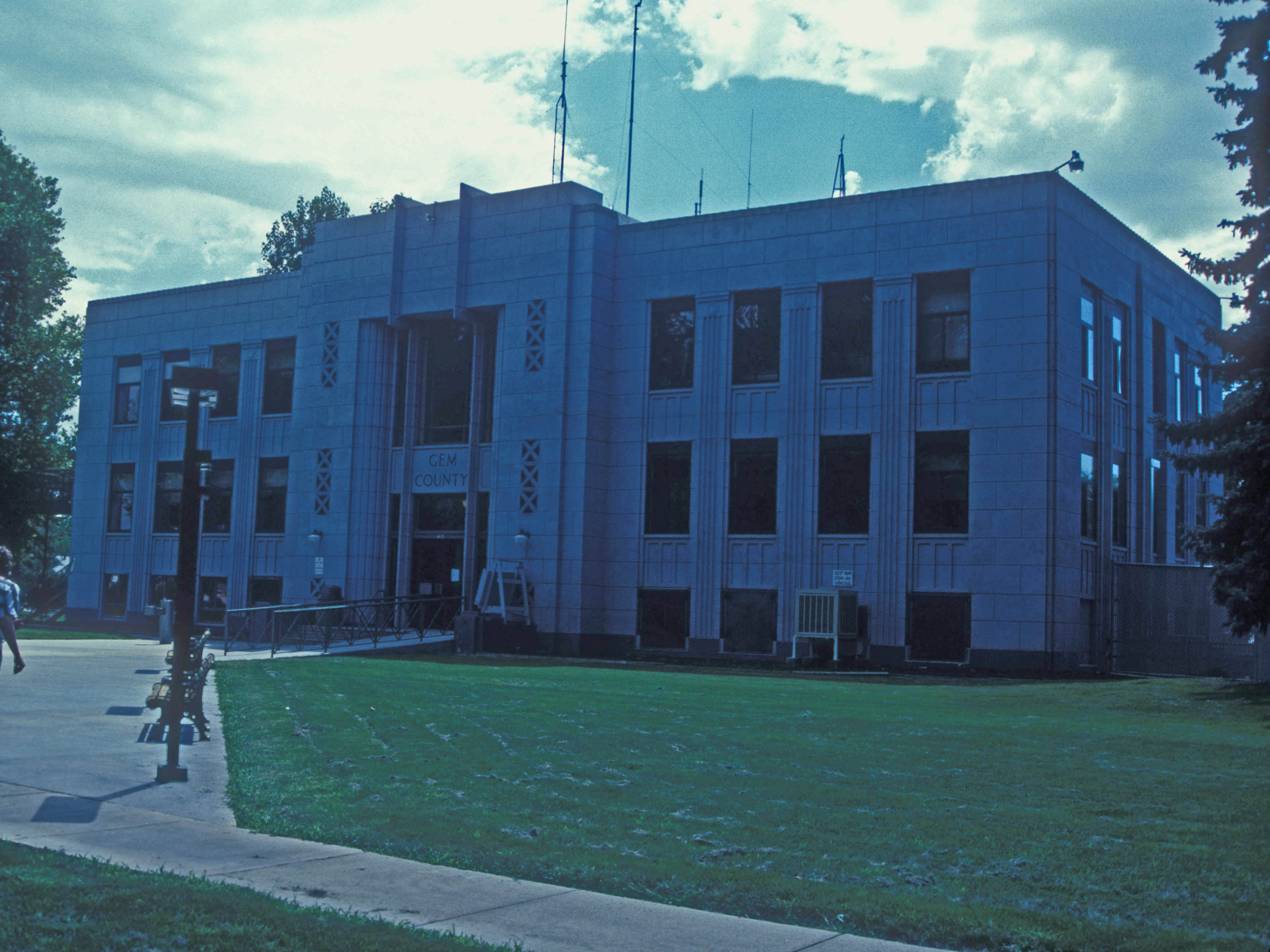
- Gem County Courthouse

- Seal

- Location within the U.S. state of Idaho
- Coordinates: 44°04′N 116°25′W
- Country: United States
- State: Idaho
- Founded: March 15, 1915
- Named for: the state nickname, "Gem State".
- Seat: Emmett
- Largest city: Emmett

Area
  - Total: 566 sq mi (1,470 km^{2})
  - Land: 561 sq mi (1,450 km^{2})
  - Water: 4.8 sq mi (12 km^{2}) 0.8%

Population (2020)
  - Total: 19,123
  - Estimate (2025): 21,773 ▲
  - Density: 34.1/sq mi (13.2/km^{2})
- Time zone: UTC−7 (Mountain)
  - Summer (DST): UTC−6 (MDT)
- Congressional district: 1st
- Website: www.gemcounty.org

Gem County is a county in the U.S. state of Idaho. As of the 2020 census, the population was 19,123. The county seat and largest city is Emmett.

Gem County is part of the Boise metropolitan area.

Gem County is home to the Idaho ground squirrel.

== History ==
Named for the state nickname, "Gem State," the county was established on March 15, 1915, partitioned from Canyon County and Boise County. Fur trappers were in the area as early as 1818, and Alexander Ross explored Squaw Creek in 1824. Prospectors and miners moved through the county in 1862 en route to the gold rush in the Boise Basin around Idaho City, and by the next year irrigation began along the Payette River. Under Washington Territory, the area was part of Idaho County from the time of settlement until the territory south of the Payette River became part of Boise County at its creation in 1863. Picket's Corral, northeast of Emmett was the base of operations for a gang of horse thieves and "bogus dust peddlers" between 1862 and 1864. The Payette Vigilance Committee eliminated the gang, bringing safety for citizens of the area. The act creating Ada County in 1864 established the Ada County boundary common to Boise County as a line from Grimes Creek to Picket's Corral and then north from that point to the existing northern boundary of Boise County, leaving the areas outside of Emmett within Boise County. Jonathan Smith and Nathaniel Martin settled near Emmett about 1862. They established a ferry on the Payette River at Emmett in 1866. On May 31, 1867, a post office was established at the ferry and named Martinsville, which was renamed Emmettsville on October 31, 1868; postal officials shortened the name of the post office to Emmett in 1885.

Census data for the area shows Squaw Creek Precinct under Boise County with a population of 30 in 1870. Ada County did not separately return precincts at that census. By 1890, Squaw Creek was split into two precincts. Those precincts were grouped with Horseshoe Bend at the 1890 census. The Emmett precinct contained 479 residents at that time. The Emmett area was transferred to Canyon County at its establishment in 1892. At the 1910 Census, three Emmett area precincts contained a population of 2,601 while three Boise County precincts of Upper Squaw Creek, Lower Squaw Creek, and Pearl contained 1,069 residents.

The Black Canyon Diversion Dam on the river was built in the early 1920s, east of Emmett.

== Geography ==
According to the U.S. Census Bureau, the county has a total area of 566 square miles (1,470 km^{2}), of which 561 square miles (1,450 km^{2}) is land and 4.8 square miles (12 km^{2}) (0.8%) is water. It is the fifth-smallest county in Idaho by area.

=== Adjacent counties ===
- Washington County - northwest
- Adams County - north
- Valley County - northeast
- Boise County - east
- Ada County - south
- Canyon County - southwest
- Payette County - west

=== National protected area ===
- Boise National Forest (part)

== Demographics ==
Historical population
Census	Pop.	Note	%±
1920	6,427		—
1930	7,419		15.4%
1940	9,544		28.6%
1950	8,730		−8.5%
1960	9,127		4.5%
1970	9,387		2.8%
1980	11,972		27.5%
1990	11,844		−1.1%
2000	15,181		28.2%
2010	16,719		10.1%
2020	19,123		14.4%
2025 (est.)	21,773	▲	13.9%
U.S. Decennial Census; 1790–1960, 1900–1990, 1990–2000, 2010, 2020

=== Racial and ethnic composition ===
Gem County, Idaho – Racial and ethnic composition Note: the US Census treats Hispanic/Latino as an ethnic category. This table excludes Latinos from the racial categories and assigns them to a separate category. Hispanics/Latinos may be of any race.
Race / Ethnicity (NH = Non-Hispanic)	Pop 1980	Pop 1990	Pop 2000	Pop 2010	Pop 2020	% 1980	% 1990	% 2000	% 2010	% 2020
White alone (NH)	11,470	11,056	13,762	14,898	16,132	95.81%	93.35%	90.65%	89.11%	84.36%
Black or African American alone (NH)	0	11	11	20	29	0.00%	0.09%	0.07%	0.12%	0.15%
Native American or Alaska Native alone (NH)	61	105	97	77	124	0.51%	0.89%	0.64%	0.46%	0.65%
Asian alone (NH)	31	53	54	78	99	0.26%	0.45%	0.36%	0.47%	0.52%
Native Hawaiian or Pacific Islander alone (NH)	x	x	9	10	20	x	x	0.06%	0.06%	0.10%
Other race alone (NH)	29	4	8	13	96	0.24%	0.03%	0.05%	0.08%	0.50%
Mixed race or Multiracial (NH)	x	x	190	287	901	x	x	1.25%	1.72%	4.71%
Hispanic or Latino (any race)	381	615	1,050	1,336	1,722	3.18%	5.19%	6.92%	7.99%	9.00%
Total	11,972	11,844	15,181	16,719	19,123	100.00%	100.00%	100.00%	100.00%	100.00%

=== 2020 census ===
As of the 2020 census, there were 19,123 people, 7,199 households, and 4,585 families living in the county. The median age was 44.1 years, with 23.7% of residents under the age of 18 and 23.0% 65 years of age or older. For every 100 females there were 100.6 males, and for every 100 females age 18 and over there were 96.9 males age 18 and over.

The racial makeup of the county was 86.9% White, 0.2% Black or African American, 0.8% American Indian and Alaska Native, 0.5% Asian, 0.1% Native Hawaiian and Pacific Islander, 4.0% from some other race, and 7.5% from two or more races. Hispanic or Latino residents of any race comprised 9.0% of the population.

53.2% of residents lived in urban areas, while 46.8% lived in rural areas.

There were 7,199 households in the county, of which 29.2% had children under the age of 18 living with them and 21.4% had a female householder with no spouse or partner present. About 23.3% of all households were made up of individuals and 13.0% had someone living alone who was 65 years of age or older.

There were 7,563 housing units, of which 4.8% were vacant. Among occupied housing units, 77.9% were owner-occupied and 22.1% were renter-occupied. The homeowner vacancy rate was 1.1% and the rental vacancy rate was 3.0%.

=== 2010 census ===
As of the 2010 United States census, there were 16,719 people, 6,495 households, and 4,611 families living in the county. The population density was 29.8 inhabitants per square mile (11.5/km^{2}). There were 7,099 housing units at an average density of 12.7 per square mile (4.9/km^{2}). The racial makeup of the county was 93.4% white, 0.6% American Indian, 0.5% Asian, 0.1% Pacific islander, 0.1% black or African American, 3.1% from other races, and 2.2% from two or more races. Those of Hispanic or Latino origin made up 8.0% of the population. In terms of ancestry, 23.2% were German, 19.2% were English, 15.8% were American, and 12.3% were Irish.

Of the 6,495 households, 30.6% had children under the age of 18 living with them, 56.9% were married couples living together, 9.3% had a female householder with no husband present, 29.0% were non-families, and 24.3% of all households were made up of individuals. The average household size was 2.55 and the average family size was 3.01. The median age was 42.9 years.

The median income for a household in the county was $42,794 and the median income for a family was $49,976. Males had a median income of $39,482 versus $31,083 for females. The per capita income for the county was $20,431. About 9.7% of families and 14.7% of the population were below the poverty line, including 17.3% of those under age 18 and 9.3% of those age 65 or over.

=== 2000 census ===
As of the census of 2000, there were 15,181 people, 5,539 households, and 4,176 families living in the county. The population density was 27 inhabitants per square mile (10/km^{2}). There were 5,888 housing units at an average density of 10 per square mile (3.9/km^{2}). The racial makeup of the county was 93.79% White, 0.73% Native American, 0.36% Asian, 0.07% Black or African American, 0.06% Pacific Islander, 3.16% from other races, and 1.83% from two or more races. 6.92% of the population were Hispanic or Latino of any race. 18.9% were of American, 17.5% German, 13.1% English and 7.2% Irish ancestry.

There were 5,539 households, out of which 34.00% had children under the age of 18 living with them, 63.40% were married couples living together, 8.40% had a female householder with no husband present, and 24.60% were non-families. 20.80% of all households were made up of individuals, and 9.90% had someone living alone who was 65 years of age or older. The average household size was 2.70 and the average family size was 3.12.

In the county, the population was spread out, with 28.00% under the age of 18, 7.60% from 18 to 24, 25.30% from 25 to 44, 23.50% from 45 to 64, and 15.60% who were 65 years of age or older. The median age was 38 years. For every 100 females, there were 98.70 males. For every 100 females age 18 and over, there were 96.70 males.

The median income for a household in the county was $34,460, and the median income for a family was $40,195. Males had a median income of $31,036 versus $20,755 for females. The per capita income for the county was $15,340. About 11.60% of families and 13.10% of the population were below the poverty line, including 15.60% of those under age 18 and 13.90% of those age 65 or over.

== Communities ==
=== City ===
- Emmett

=== Census-designated place ===
- Letha

=== Unincorporated communities ===
- Ola
- Sweet

== Politics ==
Gem County is almost always Republican. The last time a Democratic presidential candidate carried the county was in 1964 by Lyndon B. Johnson.

United States presidential election results for Gem County, Idaho
Year	Republican		Democratic		Third party(ies)	
Year	No.	%	No.	%	No.	%
1916	750	39.47%	990	52.11%	160	8.42%
1920	1,404	62.73%	832	37.18%	2	0.09%
1924	1,072	41.31%	380	14.64%	1,143	44.05%
1928	1,656	71.01%	646	27.70%	30	1.29%
1932	898	27.54%	2,007	61.55%	356	10.92%
1936	879	24.64%	2,468	69.17%	221	6.19%
1940	1,462	35.38%	2,666	64.52%	4	0.10%
1944	1,363	41.75%	1,866	57.15%	36	1.10%
1948	1,585	46.26%	1,724	50.32%	117	3.42%
1952	2,568	62.21%	1,555	37.67%	5	0.12%
1956	2,445	58.75%	1,717	41.25%	0	0.00%
1960	2,428	55.13%	1,976	44.87%	0	0.00%
1964	1,979	45.95%	2,328	54.05%	0	0.00%
1968	2,314	57.89%	1,183	29.60%	500	12.51%
1972	2,717	61.32%	1,069	24.13%	645	14.56%
1976	2,401	52.75%	1,978	43.45%	173	3.80%
1980	3,766	65.77%	1,613	28.17%	347	6.06%
1984	3,644	68.11%	1,607	30.04%	99	1.85%
1988	2,926	56.90%	2,064	40.14%	152	2.96%
1992	2,455	42.90%	1,609	28.11%	1,659	28.99%
1996	3,362	53.96%	1,968	31.58%	901	14.46%
2000	4,376	73.14%	1,346	22.50%	261	4.36%
2004	5,416	75.92%	1,628	22.82%	90	1.26%
2008	5,585	70.27%	2,166	27.25%	197	2.48%
2012	5,311	70.90%	1,957	26.12%	223	2.98%
2016	5,980	75.18%	1,229	15.45%	745	9.37%
2020	7,951	79.65%	1,803	18.06%	229	2.29%
2024	8,707	81.66%	1,699	15.93%	257	2.41%

== Education ==
There is a single K-12 school district in the county: Emmett Independent School District 221.

Residents are in the area (but not the taxation zone) for College of Western Idaho.

== Healthcare ==
The county is served by the Southwest Idaho Health District.

== See also ==
- National Register of Historic Places listings in Gem County, Idaho
