= Hibbard, Idaho =

Unincorporated community in the state of Idaho, United States

- Unincorporated community
- Location within Idaho Location within the United States
- Coordinates: 43°51′19″N 111°50′19″W
- Country: United States
- State: Idaho
- County: Madison
- Elevation: 4,849 ft (1,478 m)
- Time zone: UTC-7 (Mountain (MST))
  - Summer (DST): UTC-6 (MDT)
- Area codes: 208 and 986
- GNIS feature ID: 397787

Hibbard is an unincorporated community in Madison County, Idaho, United States. It was named after George Hibbard, the first LDS Bishop.
