= 1980 United States presidential election in Idaho =

- November 4, 1980

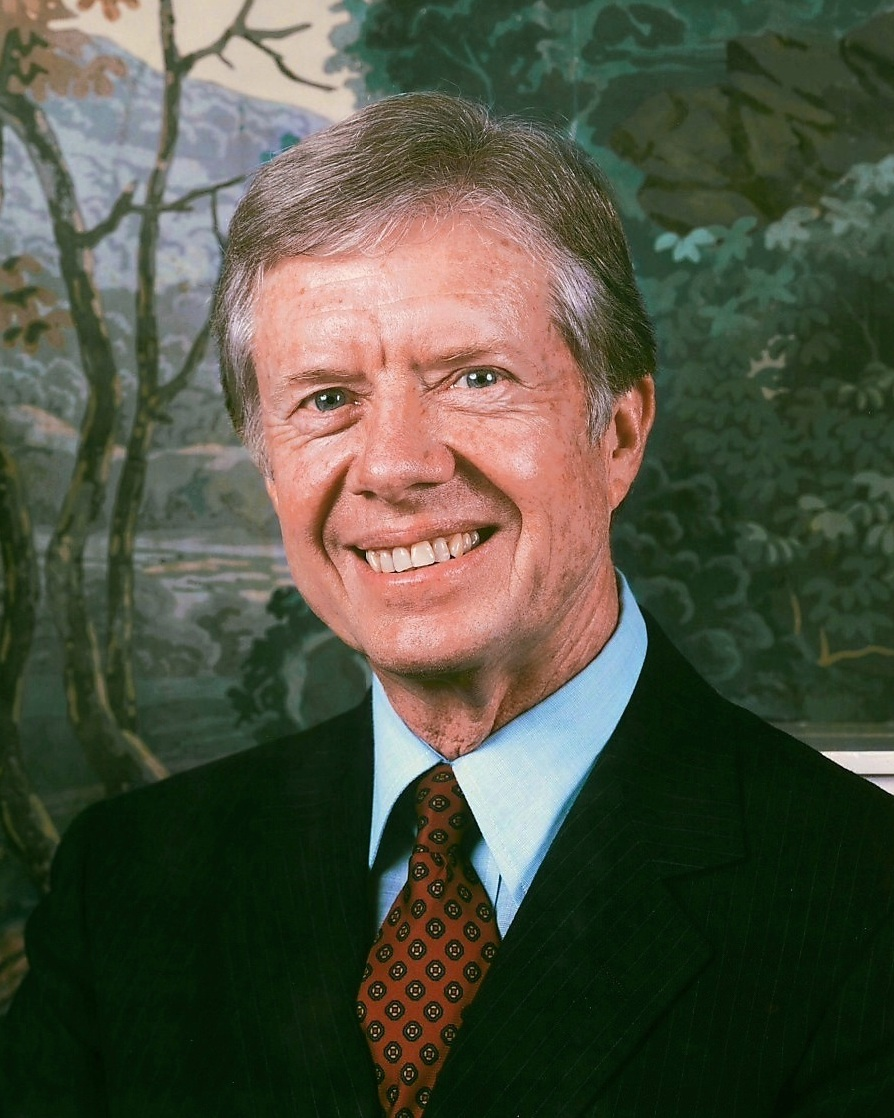

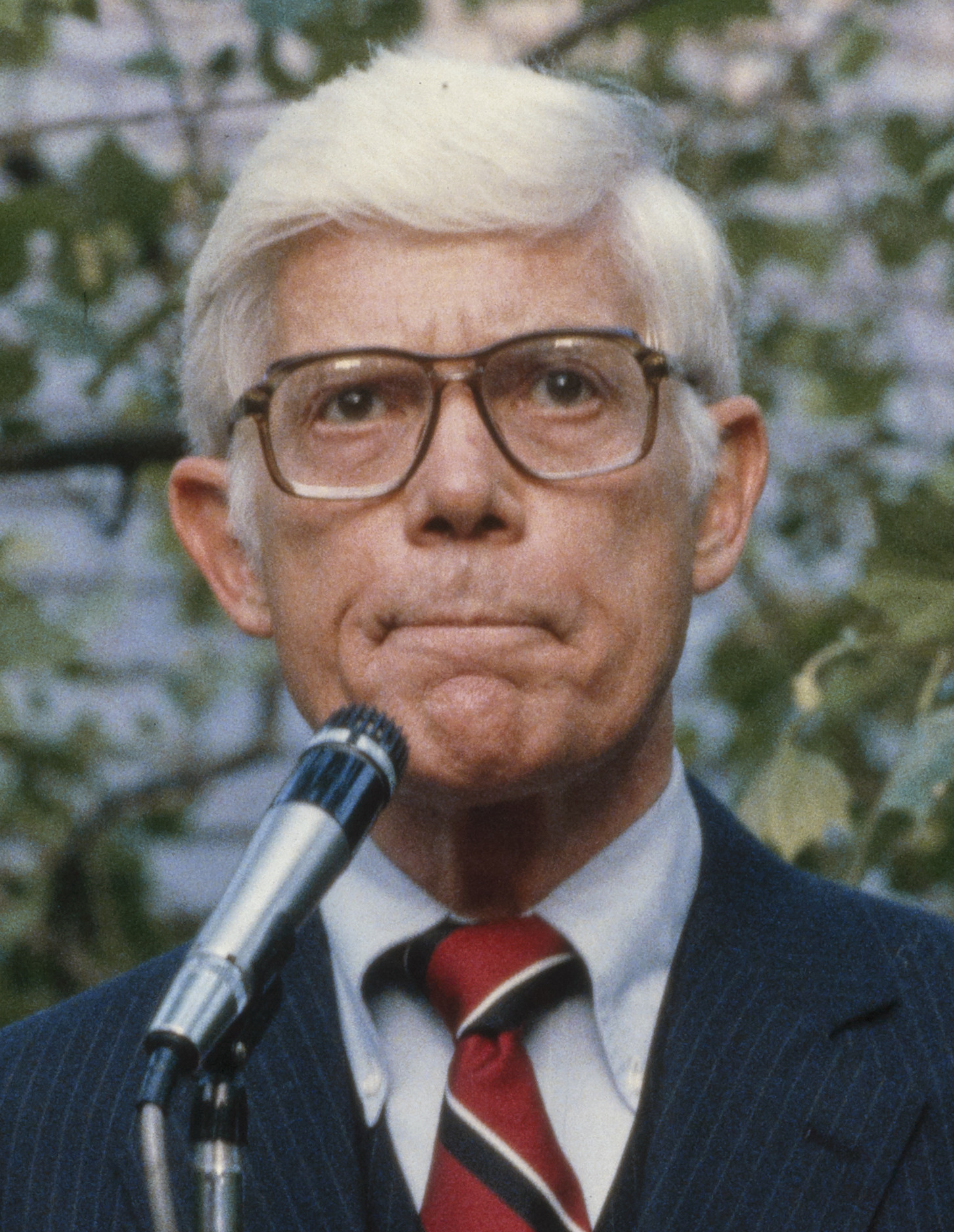
Nominee	Ronald Reagan	Jimmy Carter	John B. Anderson
Party	Republican	Democratic	Independent
Home state	California	Georgia	Illinois
Running mate	George H. W. Bush	Walter Mondale	Patrick Lucey
Electoral vote	4	0	0
Popular vote	290,699	110,192	27,058
Percentage	66.46%	25.19%	6.19%
County results
Reagan
40–50%
50–60%
60–70%
70–80%
80–90%
President before election
Jimmy Carter
Democratic
Elected President
Ronald Reagan
Republican

The 1980 United States presidential election in Idaho took place on November 4, 1980. All fifty states and The District of Columbia were part of the 1980 United States presidential election. State voters chose four electors to the Electoral College, who voted for president and vice president.

Idaho was won by former California Governor Ronald Reagan (R) by a 41-point landslide. It is a reliably Republican state, and the last Democratic presidential candidate to carry the state was Lyndon Johnson in 1964, and even Johnson won by merely five thousand votes in a national landslide. With 66.46 percent of the popular vote, Idaho would prove to be Reagan's second strongest state after neighboring Utah.

== Results ==
1980 United States presidential election in Idaho
Party	Candidate	Votes	Percentage	Electoral votes
Republican	Ronald Reagan	290,699	66.46%	4
Democratic	Jimmy Carter (incumbent)	110,192	25.19%	0
Independent	John B. Anderson	27,058	6.19%	0
Libertarian	Edward Clark	8,425	1.93%	0
American	John Rarick	1,057	0.24%	0
Totals		437,431	100.00%	4

=== Results by county ===
County	Ronald Reagan Republican		Jimmy Carter Democratic		John B. Anderson Independent		Ed Clark Libertarian		John Rarick American		Margin		Total votes cast
County	#	%	#	%	#	%	#	%	#	%	#	%	Total votes cast
Ada	55,205	63.79%	21,324	24.64%	7,987	9.23%	1,874	2.17%	154	0.18%	33,881	39.15%	86,544
Adams	1,189	62.68%	590	31.10%	88	4.64%	26	1.37%	4	0.21%	599	31.58%	1,897
Bannock	18,477	61.88%	8,639	28.93%	1,896	6.35%	771	2.58%	76	0.25%	9,838	32.95%	29,859
Bear Lake	2,941	82.45%	508	14.24%	63	1.77%	45	1.26%	10	0.28%	2,433	68.21%	3,567
Benewah	2,111	54.89%	1,361	35.39%	286	7.44%	84	2.18%	4	0.10%	750	19.50%	3,846
Bingham	11,781	76.07%	2,933	18.94%	489	3.16%	264	1.70%	20	0.13%	8,848	57.13%	15,487
Blaine	2,716	49.12%	1,840	33.28%	775	14.02%	188	3.40%	10	0.18%	876	15.84%	5,529
Boise	1,134	61.43%	518	28.06%	110	5.96%	81	4.39%	3	0.16%	616	33.37%	1,846
Bonner	6,727	56.34%	4,060	34.00%	880	7.37%	250	2.09%	23	0.19%	2,667	22.34%	11,940
Bonneville	24,715	77.55%	5,052	15.85%	1,355	4.25%	683	2.14%	64	0.20%	19,663	61.70%	31,869
Boundary	2,088	59.44%	1,087	30.94%	225	6.40%	106	3.02%	7	0.20%	1,001	28.50%	3,513
Butte	1,275	72.24%	424	24.02%	35	1.98%	28	1.59%	3	0.17%	851	48.22%	1,765
Camas	360	67.92%	145	27.36%	16	3.02%	9	1.70%	0	0.00%	215	40.56%	530
Canyon	24,375	67.68%	9,172	25.47%	1,798	4.99%	601	1.67%	70	0.19%	15,203	42.21%	36,016
Caribou	3,234	83.09%	481	12.36%	106	2.72%	59	1.52%	12	0.31%	2,753	70.73%	3,892
Cassia	6,511	78.84%	1,369	16.58%	212	2.57%	80	0.97%	87	1.05%	5,142	62.26%	8,259
Clark	379	78.47%	87	18.01%	11	2.28%	6	1.24%	0	0.00%	292	60.46%	483
Clearwater	2,178	50.49%	1,699	39.38%	291	6.75%	129	2.99%	17	0.39%	479	11.11%	4,314
Custer	1,398	73.50%	398	20.93%	64	3.36%	40	2.10%	2	0.11%	1,000	52.57%	1,902
Elmore	3,994	64.87%	1,760	28.59%	311	5.05%	88	1.43%	4	0.06%	2,234	36.28%	6,157
Franklin	3,669	85.31%	511	11.88%	61	1.42%	54	1.26%	6	0.14%	3,158	73.43%	4,301
Fremont	4,167	79.33%	926	17.63%	108	2.06%	48	0.91%	4	0.08%	3,241	61.70%	5,253
Gem	3,766	65.77%	1,613	28.17%	218	3.81%	104	1.82%	25	0.44%	2,153	37.60%	5,726
Gooding	3,897	68.43%	1,481	26.01%	218	3.83%	86	1.51%	13	0.23%	2,416	42.42%	5,695
Idaho	4,425	62.56%	2,078	29.38%	409	5.78%	136	1.92%	25	0.35%	2,347	33.18%	7,073
Jefferson	5,860	84.52%	833	12.02%	135	1.95%	91	1.31%	14	0.20%	5,027	72.50%	6,933
Jerome	4,962	74.90%	1,368	20.65%	178	2.69%	101	1.52%	16	0.24%	3,594	54.25%	6,625
Kootenai	17,022	63.25%	7,521	27.95%	1,808	6.72%	476	1.77%	85	0.32%	9,501	35.30%	26,912
Latah	6,967	46.78%	5,037	33.82%	2,465	16.55%	389	2.61%	34	0.23%	1,930	12.96%	14,892
Lemhi	2,646	71.53%	794	21.47%	167	4.51%	85	2.30%	7	0.19%	1,852	50.06%	3,699
Lewis	1,088	53.00%	774	37.70%	160	7.79%	30	1.46%	1	0.05%	314	15.30%	2,053
Lincoln	1,294	69.12%	462	24.68%	83	4.43%	30	1.60%	3	0.16%	832	44.44%	1,872
Madison	6,555	88.41%	728	9.82%	64	0.86%	51	0.69%	16	0.22%	5,827	78.59%	7,414
Minidoka	6,035	74.22%	1,689	20.77%	260	3.20%	135	1.66%	12	0.15%	4,346	53.45%	8,131
Nez Perce	7,495	47.61%	6,565	41.70%	1,344	8.54%	314	1.99%	26	0.17%	930	5.91%	15,744
Oneida	1,461	74.16%	434	22.03%	50	2.54%	23	1.17%	2	0.10%	1,027	52.13%	1,970
Owyhee	2,257	71.88%	732	23.31%	93	2.96%	53	1.69%	5	0.16%	1,525	48.57%	3,140
Payette	4,508	67.14%	1,828	27.23%	253	3.77%	105	1.56%	20	0.30%	2,680	39.91%	6,714
Power	2,235	71.11%	727	23.13%	119	3.79%	57	1.81%	5	0.16%	1,508	47.98%	3,143
Shoshone	3,994	52.04%	3,102	40.42%	407	5.30%	148	1.93%	24	0.31%	892	11.62%	7,675
Teton	1,227	72.78%	360	21.35%	67	3.97%	28	1.66%	4	0.24%	867	51.43%	1,686
Twin Falls	17,425	73.50%	4,835	20.39%	976	4.12%	344	1.45%	128	0.54%	12,590	53.11%	23,708
Valley	2,041	62.38%	926	28.30%	245	7.49%	58	1.77%	2	0.06%	1,115	34.08%	3,272
Washington	2,915	63.58%	1,421	30.99%	172	3.75%	67	1.46%	10	0.22%	1,494	32.59%	4,585
Totals	290,699	66.46%	110,192	25.19%	27,058	6.19%	8,425	1.93%	1,057	0.24%	180,507	41.27%	437,431

==== Counties that flipped from Democratic to Republican ====
- Benewah
- Clearwater
- Lewis
- Nez Perce

=== Results by congressional district ===
District	Reagan	Carter	Representative
1st	63.0%	29.5%	Steve Symms (96th Congress)
1st	63.0%	29.5%	Larry Craig (97th Congress)
2nd	73.4%	21.6%	George V. Hansen

== See also ==
- United States presidential elections in Idaho
- Presidency of Ronald Reagan
