= 1956 United States presidential election in Idaho =

- November 6, 1956

Nominee	Dwight D. Eisenhower	Adlai Stevenson
Party	Republican	Democratic
Home state	Pennsylvania (Note: Although he was born in Texas and grew up in Kansas before his military career, at the time of the 1952 election Eisenhower was president of Columbia University and was, officially, a resident of New York. During his first term as president, he moved his private residence to Gettysburg, Pennsylvania, and officially changed his residency to Pennsylvania.)	Illinois
Running mate	Richard Nixon	Estes Kefauver
Electoral vote	4	0
Popular vote	166,979	105,868
Percentage	61.17%	38.78%
County results
Eisenhower
50–60%
60–70%
70–80%
Stevenson
50–60%
60–70%
President before election
Dwight D. Eisenhower
Republican
Elected President
Dwight D. Eisenhower
Republican

The 1956 United States presidential election in Idaho took place on November 6, 1956, as part of the 1956 United States presidential election. State voters chose four representatives, or electors, to the Electoral College, who voted for president and vice president.

Idaho was won by incumbent President Dwight D. Eisenhower (R–Pennsylvania), running with Vice President Richard Nixon, with 61.17% of the popular vote, against Adlai Stevenson (D–Illinois), running with Senator Estes Kefauver, with 38.78% of the popular vote.

Eisenhower became the first Republican to carry the state of Idaho more than once.

== Results ==
1956 United States presidential election in Idaho
Party	Candidate	Votes	%
Republican	Dwight D. Eisenhower (inc.)	166,979	61.17%
Democratic	Adlai Stevenson	105,868	38.78%
Write-in		142	0.05%
Total votes		272,989	100.00%

=== Results by county ===
County	Dwight D. Eisenhower Republican		Adlai Stevenson Democratic		Various candidates Write-ins		Margin		Total votes cast
County	#	%	#	%	#	%	#	%	Total votes cast
Ada	26,387	69.96%	11,328	30.04%			15,059	39.92%	37,715
Adams	842	60.84%	542	39.16%			300	21.68%	1,384
Bannock	10,476	53.51%	9,101	46.49%			1,375	7.02%	19,577
Bear Lake	2,181	64.17%	1,218	35.83%			963	28.34%	3,399
Benewah	1,460	50.31%	1,442	49.69%			18	0.62%	2,902
Bingham	5,853	63.17%	3,412	36.83%			2,441	26.34%	9,265
Blaine	1,384	58.59%	978	41.41%			406	17.18%	2,362
Boise	570	66.67%	285	33.33%			285	33.34%	855
Bonner	3,937	52.84%	3,514	47.16%			423	5.68%	7,451
Bonneville	11,099	66.16%	5,676	33.84%			5,423	32.32%	16,775
Boundary	1,419	55.24%	1,150	44.76%			269	10.48%	2,569
Butte	774	53.64%	669	46.36%			105	7.28%	1,443
Camas	337	55.89%	266	44.11%			71	11.78%	603
Canyon	15,483	67.25%	7,540	32.75%			7,943	34.50%	23,023
Caribou	1,668	63.71%	950	36.29%			718	27.42%	2,618
Cassia	3,944	68.79%	1,789	31.21%			2,155	37.58%	5,733
Clark	318	67.80%	151	32.20%			167	35.60%	469
Clearwater	1,508	42.70%	2,024	57.30%			-516	-14.60%	3,532
Custer	811	60.34%	533	39.66%			278	20.68%	1,344
Elmore	1,849	51.25%	1,759	48.75%			90	2.50%	3,608
Franklin	2,795	70.30%	1,181	29.70%			1,614	40.60%	3,976
Fremont	2,513	62.08%	1,535	37.92%			978	24.16%	4,048
Gem	2,445	58.75%	1,717	41.25%			728	17.50%	4,162
Gooding	2,835	61.39%	1,783	38.61%			1,052	22.78%	4,618
Idaho	2,703	51.50%	2,546	48.50%			157	3.00%	5,249
Jefferson	2,748	60.12%	1,823	39.88%			925	20.24%	4,571
Jerome	3,127	64.71%	1,705	35.29%			1,422	29.42%	4,832
Kootenai	7,330	54.38%	6,149	45.62%			1,181	8.76%	13,479
Latah	5,024	57.71%	3,682	42.29%			1,342	15.42%	8,706
Lemhi	1,794	63.35%	1,038	36.65%			756	26.70%	2,832
Lewis	833	39.20%	1,292	60.80%			-459	-21.60%	2,125
Lincoln	1,069	61.83%	660	38.17%			409	23.66%	1,729
Madison	2,538	64.07%	1,423	35.93%			1,115	28.14%	3,961
Minidoka	2,954	63.58%	1,692	36.42%			1,262	27.16%	4,646
Nez Perce	5,635	46.64%	6,448	53.36%			-813	-6.72%	12,083
Oneida	1,324	64.21%	738	35.79%			586	28.42%	2,062
Owyhee	1,468	62.95%	864	37.05%			604	25.90%	2,332
Payette	3,342	65.41%	1,767	34.59%			1,575	30.82%	5,109
Power	1,108	59.03%	769	40.97%			339	18.06%	1,877
Shoshone	4,598	50.83%	4,448	49.17%			150	1.66%	9,046
Teton	842	65.12%	451	34.88%			391	30.24%	1,293
Twin Falls	12,097	68.10%	5,666	31.90%			6,431	36.20%	17,763
Valley	1,285	71.55%	511	28.45%			774	43.10%	1,796
Washington	2,272	57.89%	1,653	42.11%			619	15.78%	3,925
Totals	166,979	61.17%	105,868	38.78%	142 (Note: These write-in votes were listed only as a statewide total and not separated by county.)	0.05%	61,111	22.39%	272,989

==== Counties that flipped from Republican to Democratic ====
- Nez Perce

== See also ==
- United States presidential elections in Idaho
