= 2000 United States presidential election in Idaho =

- November 7, 2000

Nominee	George W. Bush	Al Gore
Party	Republican	Democratic
Home state	Texas	Tennessee
Running mate	Dick Cheney	Joe Lieberman
Electoral vote	4	0
Popular vote	336,937	138,637
Percentage	67.17%	27.64%
County results
Bush
50–60%
60–70%
70–80%
80–90%
Gore
40–50%
President before election
Bill Clinton
Democratic
Elected President
George W. Bush
Republican

The 2000 United States presidential election in Idaho took place on November 7, 2000, as part of the 2000 United States presidential election. Voters chose four representatives, or electors, to the Electoral College, who voted for president and vice president.

Idaho is one of the most reliable red states in the country; in 2000, Republican George W. Bush easily carried the state, winning every congressional district, and every county except Blaine, which made him the first Republican to win the White House without carrying this county since William Howard Taft in 1908. In fact, Gore received more than forty percent of the vote in only one other county: Shoshone. Third party candidates received 5.2% of the vote.

Winning 67.17% of the vote, Idaho proved to be Bush's second strongest state in the 2000 election after neighboring Wyoming.

== General election ==
=== Polling ===
Poll source	Date(s)	Sample size	Margin of error	George W. Bush (R)	Al Gore (D)	Ralph Nader (G)	Other / undecided (Note: Calculated by taking the difference of 100% and all other listed candidates combined. For polls that do not report a figure for Nader, this includes his support.)
Harris Insights & Analytics	November 3, 2000	908	—	65%	27%	1%	7%
Mason-Dixon Polling & Strategy	October 26, 2000	633	—	56%	30%	4%	10%
Rasmussen Reports	October 21, 2000	890	—	62%	24%	—	14%

=== Results ===
2000 United States presidential election in Idaho
Party	Candidate	Running mate	Votes	Percentage	Electoral votes
Republican	George W. Bush	Dick Cheney	336,937	67.17%	4
Democratic	Al Gore	Joe Lieberman	138,637	27.64%	0
Write in	Ralph Nader	Winona LaDuke	12,292	2.45%	0
Reform	Patrick Buchanan	Ezola Foster	7,615	1.52%	0
Libertarian	Harry Browne	Art Olivier	3,488	0.70%	0
Constitution	Howard Phillips	J. Curtis Frazier	1,469	0.29%	0
Natural Law	John Hagelin	A. Nat. Goldhaber	1,177	0.23%	0
Write-ins	—	—	6	0.00%	0
Totals			501,621	100.00%	4
Voter turnout					%

==== Results by county ====
County	George W. Bush Republican		Al Gore Democratic		Various candidates Other parties		Margin		Total votes cast
County	#	%	#	%	#	%	#	%	Total votes cast
Ada	75,050	60.78%	40,650	32.92%	7,785	6.30%	34,400	27.86%	123,485
Adams	1,476	77.32%	336	17.60%	97	5.08%	1,140	59.72%	1,909
Bannock	18,223	59.07%	10,892	35.30%	1,737	5.63%	7,331	23.77%	30,852
Bear Lake	2,296	79.20%	517	17.83%	86	2.97%	1,779	61.37%	2,899
Benewah	2,606	70.68%	895	24.27%	186	5.05%	1,711	46.41%	3,687
Bingham	10,628	73.47%	3,310	22.88%	527	3.65%	7,318	50.59%	14,465
Blaine	3,528	44.44%	3,748	47.22%	662	8.34%	-220	-2.78%	7,938
Boise	2,019	66.09%	745	24.39%	291	9.52%	1,274	41.70%	3,055
Bonner	8,945	61.53%	4,318	29.70%	1,274	8.77%	4,627	31.83%	14,537
Bonneville	24,988	74.47%	7,235	21.56%	1,333	3.97%	17,753	52.91%	33,556
Boundary	2,797	72.01%	832	21.42%	255	6.57%	1,965	50.59%	3,884
Butte	1,054	72.19%	354	24.25%	52	3.56%	700	47.94%	1,460
Camas	359	70.81%	113	22.29%	35	6.90%	246	48.52%	507
Canyon	30,560	71.07%	10,588	24.62%	1,852	4.31%	19,972	46.45%	43,000
Caribou	2,601	81.87%	475	14.95%	101	3.18%	2,126	66.92%	3,177
Cassia	5,983	82.20%	1,087	14.93%	209	2.87%	4,896	67.27%	7,279
Clark	311	81.41%	63	16.49%	8	2.10%	248	64.92%	382
Clearwater	2,885	74.05%	841	21.59%	170	4.36%	2,044	52.46%	3,896
Custer	1,794	77.00%	416	17.85%	120	5.15%	1,378	59.15%	2,330
Elmore	4,891	70.21%	1,840	26.41%	235	3.38%	3,051	43.80%	6,966
Franklin	3,594	84.70%	513	12.09%	136	3.21%	3,081	72.61%	4,243
Fremont	4,242	83.37%	699	13.74%	147	2.89%	3,543	69.63%	5,088
Gem	4,376	73.14%	1,346	22.50%	261	4.36%	3,030	50.64%	5,983
Gooding	3,502	69.68%	1,282	25.51%	242	4.81%	2,220	44.17%	5,026
Idaho	5,806	77.91%	1,187	15.93%	459	6.16%	4,619	61.98%	7,452
Jefferson	6,480	82.70%	1,100	14.04%	256	3.26%	5,380	68.66%	7,836
Jerome	4,418	73.55%	1,360	22.64%	229	3.81%	3,058	50.91%	6,007
Kootenai	28,162	64.28%	13,488	30.79%	2,162	4.93%	14,674	33.49%	43,812
Latah	8,161	53.30%	5,661	36.97%	1,489	9.73%	2,500	16.33%	15,311
Lemhi	2,859	78.52%	660	18.13%	122	3.35%	2,199	60.39%	3,641
Lewis	1,295	76.72%	335	19.85%	58	3.43%	960	56.87%	1,688
Lincoln	1,049	66.65%	437	27.76%	88	5.59%	612	38.89%	1,574
Madison	7,941	88.53%	816	9.10%	213	2.37%	7,125	79.43%	8,970
Minidoka	4,907	75.28%	1,344	20.62%	267	4.10%	3,563	54.66%	6,518
Nez Perce	10,577	66.02%	4,995	31.18%	449	2.80%	5,582	34.84%	16,021
Oneida	1,426	79.31%	307	17.07%	65	3.62%	1,119	62.24%	1,798
Owyhee	2,450	76.85%	623	19.54%	115	3.61%	1,827	57.31%	3,188
Payette	4,961	72.34%	1,643	23.96%	254	3.70%	3,318	48.38%	6,858
Power	1,872	69.10%	755	27.87%	82	3.03%	1,117	41.23%	2,709
Shoshone	2,879	53.46%	2,225	41.32%	281	5.22%	654	12.14%	5,385
Teton	1,745	65.33%	720	26.96%	206	7.71%	1,025	38.37%	2,671
Twin Falls	15,794	70.10%	5,777	25.64%	959	4.26%	10,017	44.46%	22,530
Valley	2,548	64.05%	1,129	28.38%	301	7.57%	1,419	35.67%	3,978
Washington	2,899	71.23%	980	24.08%	191	4.69%	1,919	47.15%	4,070
Totals	336,937	67.17%	138,637	27.64%	26,047	5.19%	198,300	39.53%	501,621

===== Counties that flipped from Democratic to Republican =====
- Latah (largest city: Moscow)
- Nez Perce (largest city: Lewiston)
- Shoshone (largest city: Kellogg)

==== By congressional district ====
Bush won both congressional districts.

District	Bush	Gore	Representative
1st	66%	28%	Butch Otter
2nd	68%	27%	Mike Simpson

== Electors ==
Technically the voters of Idaho cast their ballots for electors: representatives to the Electoral College. Idaho is allocated four electors because it has two congressional districts and two senators. All candidates who appear on the ballot or qualify to receive write-in votes must submit a list of four electors, who pledge to vote for their candidate and their running mate. Whoever wins a plurality of votes in the state is awarded all four electoral votes. Their chosen electors then vote for president and vice president. Although electors are pledged to their candidate and running mate, they are not obligated to vote for them. An elector who votes for someone other than their candidate is known as a faithless elector.

The electors of each state and the District of Columbia met on December 18, 2000 to cast their votes for president and vice president. The Electoral College itself never meets as one body. Instead, the electors from each state and the District of Columbia met in their respective capitols.

The following were the members of the Electoral College from the state. All were pledged to and voted for George W. Bush and Dick Cheney:

1. Phil Batt
2. Connie Hansen
3. James McClure
4. Orriette Sinclair

== See also ==
- United States presidential elections in Idaho
- Presidency of George W. Bush
