= 1972 United States presidential election in Idaho =

- November 7, 1972

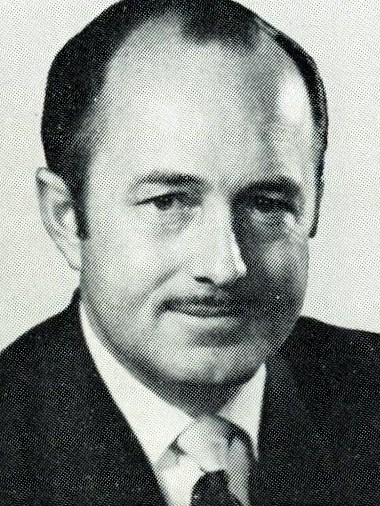
Nominee	Richard Nixon	George McGovern	John G. Schmitz
Party	Republican	Democratic	American Independent
Home state	California	South Dakota	California
Running mate	Spiro Agnew	Sargent Shriver	Thomas Anderson
Electoral vote	4	0	0
Popular vote	199,384	80,826	28,869
Percentage	64.24%	26.04%	9.30%
County results
Nixon
50–60%
60–70%
70–80%
President before election
Richard Nixon
Republican
Elected President
Richard Nixon
Republican

The 1972 United States presidential election in Idaho took place on November 7, 1972, as part of the 1972 United States presidential election. Idaho voters chose four representatives, or electors, to the Electoral College, who voted for president and vice president.

Idaho was won by incumbent President Richard Nixon (R–California), with 64.2 percent of the popular vote, against George McGovern (D–South Dakota), with 26.0% of the popular vote.

In a state that would reflect McGovern's national results, the Democratic nominee did not win a single county in Idaho. In fact, John G. Schmitz, running under the "American Independent" banner as a remnant of George Wallace's 1968 campaign, ran second ahead of McGovern in Fremont, Jefferson, Lemhi and Madison Counties. Although due to the salience of the civil rights issue there had occurred numerous cases of unpledged and "Dixiecrat" candidates receiving almost the entire vote of Deep Southern counties, and a smaller number in other antebellum slave states, Schmitz' performances in Jefferson County was at the time the best by a third-party presidential candidate in any non-Southern county since 1936 when William Lemke reached over twenty-eight percent of the vote in the North Dakota counties of Burke, Sheridan and Hettinger. With 9.30% of the popular vote, Idaho would be Schmitz's strongest state in the 1972 election.

Nixon was the first Republican to sweep all Idaho's counties since Warren G. Harding in 1920, the first to carry Clearwater and Lewis Counties since Herbert Hoover in 1928, whilst the previous occasion the Republicans had won adjacent Nez Perce County was Dwight D. Eisenhower in 1952.

== Results ==
1972 United States presidential election in Idaho
Party	Candidate	Votes	%
Republican	Richard Nixon (inc.)	199,384	64.24%
Democratic	George McGovern	80,826	26.04%
American Independent	John G. Schmitz	28,869	9.30%
Peace and Freedom	Benjamin Spock	903	0.29%
Socialist Workers	Linda Jenness	397	0.13%
Total votes		310,379	100.00%

=== Results by county ===
County	Richard Nixon Republican		George McGovern Democratic		John G. Schmitz American Independent		Various candidates Other parties		Margin		Total votes cast
County	#	%	#	%	#	%	#	%	#	%	Total votes cast
Ada	36,665	67.51%	12,687	23.36%	4,727	8.70%	232	0.43%	23,978	44.15%	54,311
Adams	963	67.77%	293	20.62%	162	11.40%	3	0.21%	670	47.15%	1,421
Bannock	12,856	57.93%	7,840	35.33%	1,348	6.07%	147	0.66%	5,016	22.60%	22,191
Bear Lake	2,213	69.48%	716	22.48%	251	7.88%	5	0.16%	1,497	47.00%	3,185
Benewah	1,494	55.54%	1,062	39.48%	129	4.80%	5	0.19%	432	16.06%	2,690
Bingham	6,886	64.33%	2,476	23.13%	1,312	12.26%	31	0.29%	4,410	41.20%	10,705
Blaine	2,113	60.98%	1,240	35.79%	97	2.80%	15	0.43%	873	25.19%	3,465
Boise	676	66.27%	256	25.10%	86	8.43%	2	0.20%	420	41.17%	1,020
Bonner	4,405	57.47%	2,599	33.91%	632	8.25%	29	0.38%	1,806	23.56%	7,665
Bonneville	13,134	61.19%	4,199	19.56%	4,073	18.97%	60	0.28%	8,935	41.63%	21,466
Boundary	1,587	59.26%	860	32.11%	218	8.14%	13	0.49%	727	27.15%	2,678
Butte	788	56.45%	387	27.72%	220	15.76%	1	0.07%	401	28.73%	1,396
Camas	344	74.30%	95	20.52%	24	5.18%	0	0.00%	249	53.78%	463
Canyon	18,383	68.45%	5,630	20.96%	2,769	10.31%	75	0.28%	12,753	47.49%	26,857
Caribou	2,069	69.95%	614	20.76%	274	9.26%	1	0.03%	1,455	49.19%	2,958
Cassia	4,576	74.26%	1,080	17.53%	473	7.68%	33	0.54%	3,496	56.73%	6,162
Clark	339	74.34%	64	14.04%	52	11.40%	1	0.22%	275	60.30%	456
Clearwater	1,590	50.67%	1,412	45.00%	112	3.57%	24	0.76%	178	5.67%	3,138
Custer	989	69.06%	274	19.13%	166	11.59%	3	0.21%	715	49.93%	1,432
Elmore	3,078	66.55%	1,153	24.93%	382	8.26%	12	0.26%	1,925	41.62%	4,625
Franklin	2,787	71.59%	611	15.69%	490	12.59%	5	0.13%	2,176	55.90%	3,893
Fremont	2,621	61.38%	819	19.18%	825	19.32%	5	0.12%	1,796 (Note: In this county where Schmitz ran second ahead of McGovern, margin given is Nixon vote minus Schmitz vote and percentage margin Nixon percent minus Schmitz percent.)	42.06%	4,270
Gem	2,717	61.32%	1,069	24.13%	637	14.38%	8	0.18%	1,648	37.19%	4,431
Gooding	3,124	70.73%	1,030	23.32%	256	5.80%	7	0.16%	2,094	47.41%	4,417
Idaho	3,235	62.20%	1,622	31.19%	330	6.34%	14	0.27%	1,613	31.01%	5,201
Jefferson	2,983	58.38%	715	13.99%	1,406	27.51%	6	0.12%	1,577	30.87%	5,110
Jerome	3,661	75.11%	888	18.22%	316	6.48%	9	0.18%	2,773	56.89%	4,874
Kootenai	9,958	61.33%	5,162	31.79%	1,076	6.63%	42	0.26%	4,796	29.54%	16,238
Latah	6,043	55.35%	4,548	41.66%	268	2.45%	59	0.54%	1,495	13.69%	10,918
Lemhi	1,812	61.99%	526	18.00%	578	19.77%	7	0.24%	1,234	42.22%	2,923
Lewis	961	56.97%	635	37.64%	85	5.04%	6	0.36%	326	19.33%	1,687
Lincoln	1,120	74.37%	313	20.78%	66	4.38%	7	0.46%	807	53.59%	1,506
Madison	3,606	69.13%	710	13.61%	889	17.04%	11	0.21%	2,717	52.09%	5,216
Minidoka	4,097	68.66%	1,423	23.85%	430	7.21%	17	0.28%	2,674	44.81%	5,967
Nez Perce	6,232	52.19%	5,081	42.55%	433	3.63%	195	1.63%	1,151	9.64%	11,941
Oneida	1,204	71.45%	402	23.86%	77	4.57%	2	0.12%	802	47.59%	1,685
Owyhee	1,630	70.14%	463	19.92%	229	9.85%	2	0.09%	1,167	50.22%	2,324
Payette	3,577	67.85%	1,113	21.11%	565	10.72%	17	0.32%	2,464	46.74%	5,272
Power	1,405	64.45%	625	28.67%	142	6.51%	8	0.37%	780	35.78%	2,180
Shoshone	3,868	53.67%	3,020	41.90%	286	3.97%	33	0.46%	848	11.77%	7,207
Teton	932	68.58%	298	21.93%	129	9.49%	0	0.00%	634	46.65%	1,359
Twin Falls	13,075	73.98%	3,344	18.92%	1,127	6.38%	127	0.72%	9,731	55.06%	17,673
Valley	1,324	61.55%	537	24.97%	280	13.02%	10	0.46%	787	36.58%	2,151
Washington	2,264	62.33%	935	25.74%	422	11.62%	11	0.30%	1,329	36.59%	3,632
Totals	199,384	64.24%	80,826	26.04%	28,869	9.30%	1,300	0.42%	118,558	38.20%	310,379

== See also ==
- United States presidential elections in Idaho
