= Lincoln, Idaho =

Coordinates: 43°31′06″N 111°58′09″W

Lincoln is a census-designated place in Bonneville County, Idaho. The community is located just east of Idaho Falls, southwest of Iona and north of Ammon. As of the 2020 census, its population was 4,556, up from 3,647 at the 2010 census. Lincoln has an area of 1.465 square miles (3.79 km^{2}), all of it land.

== History ==
Lincoln as a separate place came into being when a school house was built there in 1899 by residents who felt it was too far to send their children to school in Iona. It was originally named Centerville. In 1903 the Utah Sugar Company bought a piece of land here and built a factory. The builder of the factory was Heber C. Austin who also built many houses for factory workers and planted many trees. In 1904 a Latter-day Saint branch was organized in Lincoln as part of the Iona Ward. In 1905 the branch was made a separate ward with Austin as the bishop.

In 1930 the population of Lincoln was 500, 83% of whom were Latter-day Saints. In 2000 the population of Lincoln was around 500 as well, however by 2010 urban expansion in the Idaho Falls metropolitan area increased the population.

== Demographics ==
=== 2020 census ===
As of the 2020 census, Lincoln had a population of 4,556, up from 3,647 at the 2010 census. The median age was 26.1 years. 41.5% of residents were under the age of 18 and 5.6% of residents were 65 years of age or older. For every 100 females there were 102.2 males, and for every 100 females age 18 and over there were 106.6 males age 18 and over.

100.0% of residents lived in urban areas, while 0.0% lived in rural areas.

There were 1,256 households in Lincoln, of which 61.9% had children under the age of 18 living in them. Of all households, 67.8% were married-couple households, 12.7% were households with a male householder and no spouse or partner present, and 13.8% were households with a female householder and no spouse or partner present. About 10.4% of all households were made up of individuals and 2.2% had someone living alone who was 65 years of age or older.

There were 1,280 housing units, of which 1.9% were vacant. The homeowner vacancy rate was 0.4% and the rental vacancy rate was 2.7%.

Racial composition as of the 2020 census
Race	Number	Percent
White	3,696	81.1%
Black or African American	18	0.4%
American Indian and Alaska Native	34	0.7%
Asian	26	0.6%
Native Hawaiian and Other Pacific Islander	10	0.2%
Some other race	371	8.1%
Two or more races	401	8.8%
Hispanic or Latino (of any race)	860	18.9%

== Education ==
It is in the Bonneville Joint School District.

Elementary schools in the CDP boundary include: Discovery Elementary School and Summit Hills Elementary School. Areas zoned to Summit Hills ES are zoned to Rocky Mountain Middle School and Bonneville High School. Areas zoned to Discover ES are zoned to Black Canyon Middle School and Thunder Ridge High School. Lincoln Alternative High School is in Lincoln.

The charter school Elevate Academy Idaho Falls is in Lincoln.
