= List of killings by law enforcement officers in the United States, September 2026 =

This is a list of people reported killed by non-military law enforcement officers in the United States in September 2026, whether in the line of duty or not, and regardless of reason or method. The listing documents the occurrence of a death, making no implications regarding wrongdoing or justification on the part of the person killed or officer involved. Killings are arranged by date of the incident that caused death. Different death dates, if known, are noted in the description. The table below lists 95 people.

== September 2026 ==
Date	Name (age) of deceased	Race	Location	Description
2026-09-30	unidentified male	Unknown	Parkersburg, West Virginia	Two officers fatally shot a man at a South Parkersburg residence who failed to command while responding to a report of a man waving a long gun at a residence.
2026-09-29	Denesha Latoria Miller (39)	Black	Valdosta, Georgia	Two Lowndes County deputies driving in a unmarked vehicle were flagged down by a woman, Miller. The deputies stopped their SUV when Miller approached them. Miller subsequently pulled a handgun on them before the two shot and killed her.
2026-09-28	Jacob Zachary Deleon (45)	Hispanic	Houston, Texas	HPD officers respond to Memorial Villages Animal Hospital where a male employee who had an active warrant for indecency with a child. After officers entered the building, the man pulled out a knife. As officers gives him commands, the suspect refused. He attempted to stab a K9 during the confrontation until officers fatally shot the man.
2026-09-27	Jaffet Cuarenta (17)	Hispanic	Tyler, Texas	Tyler Police responded to reports of shots fired and later learned that the suspects fled in a vehicle. Two people were shot in the incident. The response led to a high-speed chase on Highway 31 before DPS troopers joined the chase. As the vehicle exited the city, one trooper used a PIT maneuver to terminate the chase, casuing a crash. As a result, three juveniles died on scene and another died at a hospital.
2026-09-27	Adrielle Vazquez (17)	Hispanic	Tyler, Texas	Tyler Police responded to reports of shots fired and later learned that the suspects fled in a vehicle. Two people were shot in the incident. The response led to a high-speed chase on Highway 31 before DPS troopers joined the chase. As the vehicle exited the city, one trooper used a PIT maneuver to terminate the chase, casuing a crash. As a result, three juveniles died on scene and another died at a hospital.
2026-09-27	Emigdio Gutierrez (17)	Hispanic	Tyler, Texas	Tyler Police responded to reports of shots fired and later learned that the suspects fled in a vehicle. Two people were shot in the incident. The response led to a high-speed chase on Highway 31 before DPS troopers joined the chase. As the vehicle exited the city, one trooper used a PIT maneuver to terminate the chase, casuing a crash. As a result, three juveniles died on scene and another died at a hospital.
2026-09-27	Jaiden Rodriguez (15)	Hispanic	Tyler, Texas	Tyler Police responded to reports of shots fired and later learned that the suspects fled in a vehicle. Two people were shot in the incident. The response led to a high-speed chase on Highway 31 before DPS troopers joined the chase. As the vehicle exited the city, one trooper used a PIT maneuver to terminate the chase, casuing a crash. As a result, three juveniles died on scene and another died at a hospital.
2026-09-27	Ryan Fontes (41)	White	Brooksville, Florida	An domestic dispute escalated when Fontes began shooting at his family members. Upon Hernando County deputies' arrival, Fontes began firing shots toward them before being struck by returned fire. Neither of the family members or deputies were injured.
2026-09-27	Jesiah K. Stegmann (29)	White	Chauvin, Louisiana	A Terrebonne Parish deputy responded to a disturbance and engage in a physical altercation with Stegmann. The deputy was injured and ultimately shot Stegmann.
2026-09-27	Samuel Santiago Daniel (26)	Hispanic	Madera, California	Officers responded to a report of a man acting erratically and flooding the home. As officers were preparing to leave the residence after being able to evacuate the family out of the house safely, Daniel came out of the home and presented a replica gun as officers engaged with him, before officers shot him, killing him.
2026-09-27	Gerald Brandon Cowell (49)	Unknown	Tacoma, Washington	Police officers shot and killed a suspect in a domestic assault incident. No additional details were released.
2026-09-27	Edgar Yballe (53)	Asian	Bellflower, California	LASD deputies responded to a 911 report of an unresponsive elderly woman lying in a pool of blood through a window at a residence. As the male neighbor who called 911 spotted the unresponsive victim, she was treated by LAFD but was pronounced dead on scene. As they performed a protective sweep to see if anyone else was in the home, deputies reportedly encountered the man with the gun. Two deputies fatally shot him. The footage had been released.
2026-09-26	Gregory Buckley (31)	White	Lakeville, Massachusetts	A family member reported to the police that Buckley was armed and acted erratically. When officers entered his residence, they encountered Buckley and exchanged fire with him. Buckley was fatally shot.
2026-09-26	Christopher Olson (39)	White	Battle Lake, Minnesota	Otter Tail County Sheriff’s Office responded to a home after the subject's relatives called the police, reporting that the subject barricaded himself which armed with a shotgun. Police arrived and a Fergus Falls officer shot the man when he fired at a SWAT vehicle. During the incident, only the Otter Tail County SWAT team was equipped with body-worn cameras, though they didn't captured the juncture of the shooting, since the members were inside an armored truck. The footage was released.
2026-09-25	Jordan Alexander Werk (38)	Native American	Harlem, Montana	On September 24, Blaine County deputies responded to a report that Werk was armed with a high-powered rifle at his mother's apartment. Werk claimed she wasn't inside, but deputies had information to believe otherwise. After they obtained a search and arrest warrant and attempted to execute, Werk barricaded himself with firearms. Due to the lack of equipment the sheriff's office required, multiple agencies responded, including FBI, Great Falls Police, Cascade County Sheriff's Office, Billings Police SWAT team, Montana Highway Patrol, Valley County Sheriff's Office, Fort Belknap Tribal Police and Central Montana High Risk Unit. After deploying less-lethal force inside the apartment, Werk exited and exchanged fire with police. He was shot and killed early September 25. His mother was found dead inside.
2026-09-25	Andre Moore (37)	Black	Middle Township, New Jersey	Officers came across a disabled gray sixth-generation Nissan Altima and heard a woman screaming. Officers found Moore was holding a knife to a wounded woman before they opened fire, killing him.
2026-09-25	Cortez Bailey (33)	Black	Cincinnati, Ohio	Police responded to an active shooter incident at the Talber House. Officers formed a SWAT team, breached in, and encountered Bailey, who shot at them but was obstructed by the bullet proof glass. Officers went further inside as Bailey fled before they exchanged fire in the cafeteria, where Bailey was shot dead.
2026-09-25	Joseph Arnold Vallombroso (35)	White	Tucson, Arizona	During a domestic dispute response, a suspect walked toward Pima County deputies with two sharp objects before being shot.
2026-09-25	Jesus Blas-Rodríguez (24)	Hispanic	Manor, Texas	A possibly intoxicated pedestrian walking on the roadway was struck and killed by an on-duty patrol vehicle. Police said the officer didn't have time to avoid.
2026-09-24	Eddie Brandon Todd Campbell (39)	Black	Portland, Oregon	US Marshals, Gresham Police, and Portland Police task force encountered a wanted local homicide suspect at ChestnutTree Inn near Interstate 205. A shootout occurred which left the suspect dead. Portland Police K9 Kylo, reportedly on its last shift before retirement, was also shot by police gunfire. After being transported to two veterinary hospitals, veterinarians made the final decision to euthanize Kylo. The foootage had been released by PPD.
2026-09-23	unidentified male	Unknown	Long Bottom, Ohio	Meigs County deputies responded to a breaking-and-entering at a residence where the suspect reportedly threatened the homeowner. As deputies arrived, the suspect fled, resisted arrest, and was tased and physically restrained. After deputies applied restraints on the suspect, he suddenly became unconscious and died afterwards.
2026-09-23	Herman James	Unknown	San Bernardino, California	Police responded to a shooting at a home where they found two victims with gunshot wounds. Officers exchanged fire and killed the suspect when the suspect shot at them.
2026-09-23	Zachary Dunn (29)	White	Lansing, Michigan	Police received reports of an armed man who was banging on doors. Police negotiated with the man, with him pointing the gun at his head. When officers tried to tase him, he fled, before ultimately turning around and pointing the gun at officers. An officer shot him. The footage was released.
2026-09-22	Tyler Rogers (28)	Unknown	Panama City, Florida	Police responded to a shooting at a home and learned that an armed suspect along with his mother were inside. Upon arrival, Rogers told the officers he had a handgun, raised his T-shirt, and charged toward the officers. Officers shot him. Police later determined Rogers was unarmed. Police said officers responded to the residence two weeks ago for a suicidal subject.
2026-09-22	Matthew Dupree (35)	Unknown	Keystone Heights, Florida	Clay Behavioral Health Center staffers requested a wellness check on Dupree due to his behavior prior the day, including Durpree threatened to shoot himself after being taken off medication. When deputies pulled a over a vehicle which Durpree was in, Dupree pulled a gun on them before he was shot.
2026-09-22	Ernest Christopher Nathan (47)	Black	Pine Hill, Alabama	US Marshals task force officers were executing a warrant on a murder suspect, Nathan. An officer was shot by Nathan before other officers shot Nathan to death. Nathan was on the Texas 10 Most Wanted murder fugitive list. Nathan was wanted out of Harris County, Texas, for a Sept. 25, 2022, for shooting and killing a man during an argument and failed to appear on court.
2026-09-22	Travis McDermott (38)	Unknown	Cedar Rapids, Iowa	Officers responded to a report of a man, McDermott, was displaying a gun in a reckless behavior near Daniels Park. During the encounter, two officers shot McDermott, who was continuing displaying the firearm. McDermott died a day later.
2026-09-22	Montique Treymayne Gaston (39)	Black	Staunton, Virginia	Gaston, of Portsmouth, Virginia, was killed in a police shooting at a Walmart parking lot while officers responded to an unknown 911 call. Details were currently limited.
2026-09-21	Brian Oliver (41)	White	Portland, Maine	Police officers arrived at a scene where Oliver was assaulting another man with a weapon. The man died at the scene. Oliver refused orders to drop the weapon when officers shot him. He also died a few days later.
2026-09-21	Christopher Sumner (41)	Unknown	Claremont, California	LASD deputies were conducting a pre-planned eviction when an individual reported a theft. They confronted the suspect and shot him when the suspect charged at them with a knife.
2026-09-21	Derek Spencer (44)	White	Placer County, California	On September 20, Placer County deputies initially responded to a call about the suspect, Spencer, was threatening people with a gun. As they arrived, they found a woman shot and killed by Spencer. Spencer later rammed and disabled the pursuing patrol cars with a vehicle he attained during an armed carjacking on September 19 in El Dorado County, prompting the chase to be terminated. As the manhunt began, the sheriff's office learned that he was in a woods and located him with a helicopter on early Monday. A shootout lasting over two hours involving eight different SWAT teams and multiple agencies eventually ended with Spencer's death. Police also said Spencer started a Mineral Fire near the area during the shooting.
2026-09-20	Kenneth Earl Cansler (29)	White	San Angelo, Texas	A DPS trooper stopped Cansler for a turn signal violation. An altercation between them ensued before Cansler drew a weapon. The trooper shot him in response.
2026-09-19	David Coursey (36)	White	Sycamore, Illinois	Officers respond to a report of a man approaching an unidentified vehicle with a sharp object in his hand. After officers arrived, Coursey charged at officers with a knife before officers fatally shot him dead.
2026-09-19	Dillon James Wright (31)	White	Provo, Utah	During a domestic violence investigation near the Baymont Provo River hotel, two officers shot and killed a man who was armed.
2026-09-18	Curtis Jermaine Massey (47)	Black	Charlotte, North Carolina	CMPD officers observed a criminal transaction and pursued the suspect who left the scene. At some point during the chase, the man pulled out a gun and was shot by officers.
2026-09-18	Luke Adam Figueroa-Weaver (29)	White	Woodland, California	Family members called the police, for an armed man who may have been experiencing mental health crisis and was suicidal. The man barricaded himself and fired shots afterwards. Considering that, SWAT and negotiation team responded and attempted to get him surrender, but to no avail. Roughly two hours later, the man exited the residence and pointed the gun at police when officers fired their service weapons, killing him. The footage had been released by police.
2026-09-17	Keaton Daucher (41)	White	Sebastian, Florida	Police responded to a home for a noise complaint when Daucher exited the home with a shotgun. Two officers shot and killed him.
2026-09-17	Daniel Thomas Shand (28)	White	Miami, Florida	Shand approached an FDLE agent who was sitting in his vehicle and began striking the car's window. The agent exited the car and was body-slammed by Shand. At some point during the fight, the agent fired his gun, killing him. The entire incident caused a nearby middle school to be placed on lockdown for a time.
2026-09-17	Rex Alexander Magann (32)	White	South Palm Beach, Florida	Magann tried to carjack a Palm Beach County deputy and attempted to take her gun. During the scuffle, the deputy suffered injuries before ultimately shooting and killing Magann. Authorities said Magann had countless encounters with law enforcement and was on probation for battery against law enforcement.
2026-09-17	David Eversole (56)	White	Arlington, Texas	A knife-wielding suicidal man was shot by police when he moved toward them. The footage was released by police.
2026-09-17	Randall Kelley (44)	White	Paso Robles, California	A wanted man was chased by authorities along Highway 101. A pursued and standoff occurred before the man, Kelly, ultimately pointed a BB gun at San Luis Obispo County deputies. Deputies shot him.
2026-09-16	Terry Landos (64)	White	Surprise, Arizona	Landos shot and killed his brother in Glendale during an altercation before fleeing the scene in a van. Detectives located him armed and officers shot him for reasons unknown.
2026-09-16	Saul Sandoval Chavez (33)	Hispanic	San Diego, California	A man smashed car windows with a metal rod, went inside a North Park Adult Emporium store with a blow torch, and tried to set the store on fire. Officers utilized non-lethal means before sending a K9 to subdue the suspect. The suspect set the K9's neck on fire, leading three officers to sustain burns while they tried to extinguish the flames on the K9. When the suspect set himself on fire and approached the officers, officers opened fire and shot him dead. The footage had been released by SDPD.
2026-09-15	Bryan Daniel Saldivar-Hernandez (27)	Hispanic	Beulaville, North Carolina	A state trooper chased a speeding driver when the driver failed to stop in a traffic stop. A violent physical altercation ensued when the trooper engaged the suspect, at which point, the trooper discharged his gun, killing him.
2026-09-15	Ryan Woods (40)	Unknown	Oakville, Missouri	A welfare check at a residence escalated into a shootout when St. Louis County officers were fired upon arrival. Officers returned fire and found the shooter, Woods, died from a gunshot wound fired by police. The footage had been released.
2026-09-15	Maximillian Bronson (28)	White	Gilbert, Arizona	A mother called the police, reporting that her son was outside carrying a knife in a mental health episode. When the first officer arrived, Bronson walked toward the officer with a knife before being fatally shot. The footage had been released.
2026-09-15	Rosa Barker (41)	Hispanic	Madisonville, Tennessee	Police responded to a Tennessee Department of Human Services office, for a former employee bearing multiple firearms. A police officer shot the woman in the incident for reasons undisclosed. She died a day later.
2026-09-15	Joseph J. D’Errico Jr. (64)	White	Alliance, Ohio	D’Errico brandished a firearm at the Wally Armour Chrysler Dodge Jeep Ram dealership during an altercation with the employees before leaving the business. When officers stopped his car, he refused orders, exited the car, and seemed to be reaching for his gun and pointed it at them. Officers tased and shot him within moments. The footage was released.
2026-09-15	Allen Lemburg (41)	White	Iowa City, Iowa	A person armed with a knife was fatally shot by two police officers. Prior to the shooting, the individual threatened people.
2026-09-14	Amir Hamza (45)	Unknown	Cairo, New York	NYSP responded to an assault in a campground and found a victim who suffered head injuries. When the trooper located the suspect, Hamza, Hamza approached the trooper with a gun before he was shot. Police later determined that gun was a BB gun.
2026-09-14	unidentified male	Unknown	Kirtland, New Mexico	During a domestic violence response at a Dollar General store, the suspect advanced toward San Juan County deputies with a knife above his head. A deputy shot and killed him.
2026-09-14	David McRae (33)	White	Clarksville, Tennessee	A woman called the police reporting that her son, McRae was outside firing a weapon. McRae later fired at the responding officers before being fatally struck by returned fire.
2026-09-13	Ryan Street (35)	Native American	Owyhee, Nevada	Street, a Native American, was shot and killed by Bureau of Indian Affairs officers on the Duck Valley Indian Reservation during an encounter for reasons unknown. A taser was used during the incident. BIA did not respond to or release any details, so did Federal Bureau of Investigation, which is investigating the incident.
2026-09-13	Dawn Smith (65)	Unknown	Spring Grove, Illinois	An officer driving a cruiser responding to a call with lights and sirens on sped through a red light at an intersection, resulting in a four-vehicle collision. A woman was killed and seven others were injured.
2026-09-12	Keenan Charles Pearson (47)	Black	Seattle, Washington	Officers on patrol found Pearson, who was lying on the street after being ejected by bar security. After he stepped forward off of the pushbar and fell to the ground, four to five officers turned him on his abdomen and began handcuffing him, for safety concerns. According to a witness, officers were on top of him for around three minutes until he stopped moving and responding. She said one of them was kneeling on his neck. Pearson soon became unresponsive and was pronounced dead by medics.
2026-09-12	Jonathan Farkhondehpour (37)	Middle Eastern	Los Angeles, California	Officers responded to a stabbing and confronted Farkhondehpour, who was carrying a knife. Farkhondehpour hold his brother hostage, while shouting "I promise you, it's either suicide by cop, or I kill my brother, you kill me." He also stated that he had already slit his brother's throat. Officers breached his room, observed Farkhondehpour struggling with his brother, before shooting him in the back. The victims survived the stabbing. The Medical Examiner's Office said Farkhondehpour was intoxicated due to alcohol at the time. The footage had been released.
2026-09-11	Jeron Bruce Bradford (61)	Black	Rome, Georgia	During a traffic stop, Bradford exited his vehicle, pulled a gun from his pants, and shot at officers. Officers shot back and killed him.
2026-09-10	Michael James Sowards (21)	White	Federal Way, Washington	A suspect who was reported to be pointing a gun at people in a parking lot was shot dead by responding officers when he raised the gun at them.
2026-09-09	Danny Ruckert (43)	Unknown	La Grange, Texas	During a domestic disturbance incident, Ruckurt fired in a home and pointed the gun at the first responding officer. The officer shot him dead.
2026-09-09	Daniel Eric Colon (43)	White	Cape Coral, Florida	Colon had a gun and a knife when he broke down a door and entered a relative's home. When officers located him behind a dumpster, he pointed a CO2 airsoft gun at officers before they shot him.
2026-09-09	Stephie N. Bean (40)	Unknown	Fries, Virginia	Bean was killed in a confrontation with Carroll County deputies under unknown circumstances while deputies were serving warrants at a home. Another man was arrested.
2026-09-09	Ayham Babidi (21)	Middle Eastern	Des Plaines, Illinois	During a disturbance response, an officer found Badibi armed with electric hedge trimmer. Babidi kept advancing toward the officer with the weapon before the officer shot him. Babidi's family said he had mental health issues. Police said the officer's bodycam wasn't activated during the shooting, though the dashcam footage was recovered. The footage was released, though the moment of the shooting was obtructed by a tree.
2026-09-09	Nelson Boyd Chavis (40)	White	Williamsburg County, South Carolina	Florence County deputies tried to execute a search warrant on Chavis prior to a chase that ended in a woods in Williamsburg County. Chavis fired at them before being fatally shot.
2026-09-09	Brandon William Hampson (55)	White	Erving, Massachusetts	State Police located Hampson, a Sayville, New York resident and homicide suspect who murdered his wife in Long Island, outside the French King Restaurant and Motel. As Hampson confronted the troopers with a lethal weapon, the troopers fatally shot him in response.
2026-09-08	Joseph Alexander Vanzan (61)	Unknown	Rancho Cordova, California	State police tried to pull over a Volvo SUV driving without headlights. The driver fled, triggering a 40-minute pursuit through Rancho Cordova and Fair Oaks. After driving over spike strips, the suspect exited the car and pulled a out a pellet gun, leading troopers to shoot him.
2026-09-08	Printis Smith (23)	Black	Milwaukee, Wisconsin	Officers were on patrol when they found a Chevrolet Equinox connected to a shooting. An officer chased after one of the suspects, Smith, before the two exchanged fire, leaving Smith dead and the officer injured. The other suspect is still at large. The footage was released.
2026-09-08	Devin Morris (33)	Black	Baton Rouge, Louisiana	Morris stabbed an elderly man, stole the man's car, led police on a chase, before barricading himself at an abandoned apartment complex while armed with a knife. As Special Response team arrived and tried to apprehend Morris, Morris fought with an officer for the officer's rifle. The officer fired a shot, killing him. The footage was released, though it did not recorded the shooting. BRPD says the SRT members inside the apartment were not required to wear body cameras during the operation, which was included in the department's guideline.
2026-09-08	Joel Malin (20)	White	Spokane Valley, Washington	Police responded to a report about an armed man near a middle school, later identified as Malin. When Spokane County deputies engaged Malin, Malin charged at the deputy and pointed a gun at him before the deputy fired. A BB gun was recovered at the scene. Reports said Malin was called 911 on himself. The security footage was released.
2026-09-08	unidentified male	Unknown	Rapid City, South Dakota	Police responded to a report about a suspicious person before involving in a scuffle with the suspect, who had ingested drugs. Police used force, tasers, and applied WRAP restraints on the man before they check his vital signs. After being cleared, the suspect was placed into a cruiser to be sent into a jail. He became unresponsive in the cruiser and died afterwards.
2026-09-07	Anthony Angeles (19)	Hispanic	Tucker, Georgia	A K9 GSP trooper from the Crime Suppression Unit was chasing a Chrysler 300 suspected of illegal street racing and stunt driving. During the pursuit, the trooper's vehicle collided with a GMC Sierra pickup truck at an intersection, causing both vehicles to catch fire. Angeles died and another passenger was injured. Both the Chrysler 300 and the pickup truck participated in a stunt driving activity, which were the vehicles that troopers were looking for.
2026-09-07	Ronalds Perez (58)	Hispanic	River Oaks, Texas	During a welfare check, officers shot a suicidal male who aimed a gun at them despite commands.
2026-09-07	Michael Antonio Santacruz (37)	Hispanic	Garland, Texas	Santacruz was armed with a machete when officers tried to negotiate with him. Despite less-lethal means and attempts to disarm, Santacruz ultimately advanced toward them before being shot.
2026-09-07	Christian Santiago (20)	Hispanic	Scranton, Pennsylvania	Santiago stole a gun from his relative's home before his family members called the police and obtained an involuntary mental health commitment warrant on him. State troopers initiated a vehicular pursuit on the interstate and ended it with a PIT maneuver on Santiago's vehicle. Santiago then pointed a rifle and fired a shot, leading troopers to shoot him. It is unknown whether the cause of death.
2026-09-07	Zimran Canas (44)	Hispanic	Los Angeles, California	Police fatally shot Canas, who was armed with a metal pole with a serrated blade in the Boyle Heights neighborhood, when he pointed the weapon toward officers. Police had released the footage.
2026-09-06	unidentified male	Unknown	Seaside, Oregon	Seaside and Gearhart PD responded to reports of disturbance. While en-route, they received reports of gunshots breaking out at the scene. Officers arrived and killed the suspect in a shootout.
2026-09-06	Benjamin Hibbert (52)	White	Maynardville, Tennessee	Hibbert, a former Knox County deputy, was arrested, charged with DUI, and sent into the Union County Jail after his wife alerted law enforcement. Despite warnings from the wife of Hibbert's medical condition, Hibbert died in a drunk tank when jailers failed to provide medical aid and check on him. A wrongful death lawsuit is pending, claiming the guards simply walking by to electronic-scan log points, falsifying mandated 15-minute and hourly safety checks without ever looking inside his cell to assess his vital signs.
2026-09-06	Jonathan Delgado (20)	Hispanic	Phoenix, Arizona	Phoenix officers respond to a suicidal man attempting to kill himself at an alleyway in the Pamella Terrace neighborhood of North Phoenix. As Delgado allegedly refused orders to drop a knife and walked toward them, officers deployed tasers which failed. Delgado ran towards officers with the knife before officers fatally shot him dead. Police released the following footage.
2026-09-05	Kevin Daniel Stevens (22)	Black	Oildale, California	During a high-speed pursuit of a wanted suspect, Bakersfield Police deployed spike strips, leading the suspect to swerve and hit a pedestrian. The pedestrian died on scene.
2026-09-05	Elijah Fowlkes (27)	White	Pueblo, Colorado	An armed domestic disturbance escalated into a kidnapping when the suspect, Fowlkes, fled while carrying an infant. At some point, he put the infant in a stroller and began reaching inside his backpack. An officer shot him. The infant was not injured. The footage was released by police.
2026-09-05	Stanley Richard (30)	Black	Fort Myers, Florida	Richard called police during a fight with his girlfriend in the Love Joy Park neighborhood near downtown Fort Myers. After police arrived, Richard went outside and fled officers on foot, before one officer shot him dead.
2026-09-04	Sean Thornton (37)	Unknown	Middle Smithfield Township, Pennsylvania	State police shot and killed a local man following a disturbance call. He was taken to Lehigh Valley Hospital–Pocono in East Stroudsburg where he was pronounced dead. Details are currently limited.
2026-09-04	Marcus Griffin (43)	White	Lincoln, Idaho	Bonneville County sheriff's deputies responded to a man reporting he was going to harm himself. Deputies shot and killed the man in an exchanged of gunfire. The footage was released.
2026-09-04	Chaun Bottom (41)	Black	New York City, New York	A police sergeant on the ground shot and killed a knife-wielding suicidal man after he climbed onto the cables of the Brooklyn Bridge and advanced toward emergency responders. The footage was released.
2026-09-03	Sadie Holman (21)	White	Middle River, Maryland	Baltimore County officers responded to a call about an armed suspect who was wanted in an assault. They engaged Holman, the suspect. Holman produced a knife and a gun before an officer shot her. Her death was announced six days later. The footage was released by Maryland Attorney General's Office.
2026-09-03	Mario Francisco Mendoza Jr. (34)	Hispanic	Canby, Oregon	Police contacted a man who reportedly tried to break into an apartment. The man fired at officers and was shot.
2026-09-03	Linda Croteau (71)	White	Port Orange, Florida	Croteau entered the Port Orange Police Department lobby and fired a single gunshot towards the evidence room. She exited the building and was confronted by officers, who shot her as she approached them with the gun. The footage of the shooting was released by police.
2026-09-03	Scott Carroll Jr. (44)	White	McMinnville, Tennessee	A domestic disturbance escalated into a standoff after Carroll barricaded himself. Despite negotiations, Carroll fired at police before being killed by two officers in a shootout. The footage before the shooting was released.
2026-09-02	Tony Angel Milner (58)	White	Mineola, Texas	A Wood County deputy conducted a stop on Milner and attempted to search the car after the deputy smelled marijuana. As Milner exited the car, he retrieved a gun and pointed at the deputies. A deputy shot and killed him on the roadway. Another passenger was detained.
2026-09-02	unidentified male (45)	Unknown	Williamsburg, Virginia	York-Poquoson Sheriff’s Office responded to a sexual harassment and assault call at the Wyndham’s Governor’s Green Timeshare Resort. Deputies wrestled the suspect to the ground when they were met with resistance before taking him into custody. The suspect later suffered a medical emergency and died at a hospital.
2026-09-02	Carlton Neal Johnson II (35)	Black	Minneapolis, Minnesota	Johnson shot and injured his girlfriend at their downtown apartment before fatally shooting two neighbors. He also shot and injured two building employees. In the ensuing shoot-out, Johnson injured two officers before being killed by police. The footage was released.
2026-09-02	Daniel Eduardo Arias	Hispanic	Wichita Falls, Texas	Police responded to a reported suicidal man and encountered Arias outside his apartment building with a firearm. Following a stand-off, an officer shot Arias.
2026-09-02	Jonathon Severs (30)	Black	Whitesville, Kentucky	Severs, of Owensboro, shot a 37-year-old woman and abducted her adult daughter in Ohio County. Police pursued Severs until he crashed near Whitesville in Daviess County, then shot him after he exited his vehicle with a gun. The woman he abducted was found dead of a gunshot wound in the vehicle, though it was not stated who shot her.
2026-09-01	Joseph David Harrison (22)	White	Longview, Texas	A motorcyclist was fleeing police after an attempted traffic stop. An officer later parked his patrol car in the roadway, so as to stop the suspect. The suspect collided with a patrol car and was killed.
2026-09-01	Angel Saravia-Estrada (19)	Hispanic	Camden, New Jersey	An off-duty police officer struck and killed Saravia-Estrada in a crash.
2026-09-01	Erika Katelyn Burch (38)	White	Maryville, Tennessee	Police responded to reports of a woman who was making threats and aiming at passerby. Three Blount County deputies shot her when she came toward them with a knife.

== See also ==
- Death in custody § United States
- Henry A. Wallace Police Crime Public Database
- List of cases of police brutality
- List of countries with annual rates and counts for killings by law enforcement officers
- List of law enforcement officers killed in the line of duty in the United States
- List of law enforcement officers convicted for an on-duty killing in the United States
- List of shootings by US immigration agents
- List of police reforms related to the George Floyd protests
- List of unarmed African Americans killed by law enforcement officers in the United States
- Lists of killings by law enforcement officers
- Police brutality in the United States
- Police misconduct § United States
- Police riot § United States
- Police use of deadly force in the United States
