= Idaho State Highway 43 =

State highway located in Bonneville County, Idaho

State Highway 43
- SH-43 highlighted in red

Route information
- Maintained by ITD
- Length: 3.868 mi (6.225 km)

Major junctions
- West end: US 26 in Beachs Corner
- East end: US 20 in Ucon

Location
- Country: United States
- State: Idaho

Highway system
- Idaho State Highway System; Interstate; US; State
← SH-41	→ SH-44

State Highway 43 (SH-43) is a 3.868-mile-long (6.225 km) state highway located in Bonneville County, Idaho. SH-43 runs from its southern terminus at U.S. Route 26 (US-26) in Beachs Corner to its northern terminus at US-20 in Ucon. The highway is maintained by the Idaho Transportation Department.

== Route description ==
SH-43 begins at an intersection with U.S. Route 26 controlled by a traffic light in the community of Beachs Corner. The highway heads north as the Yellowstone Highway past several businesses and a residential district before entering a rural area. It crosses Willow Creek after passing 77th Road and enters a residential area at an intersection with 81st Road. After returning to a rural environment, SH-43 crosses a canal and continues north past 97th Road. It enters the city of Ucon, passing an auto parts yard to the west. The highway turns west onto 4th Street and continues northeast across a railroad. It leaves the Ucon city limits before terminating at U.S. Route 20.

== Major intersections ==
The entire route is in Bonneville County.

Location	mi	km	Destinations	Notes
	0.000	0.000	US 26	
Ucon	3.868	6.225	US 20	
1.000 mi = 1.609 km; 1.000 km = 0.621 mi
