= D93 =

D93 may refer to:

- HMS Dunedin (D93)
- HMS Malta (D93)
- HMS Vigilant (D93)
- INS Gomati (D93)
- Jodel D.93, French single-seat ultralight monoplane

== See also ==
- Bonneville Joint School District #93 (D93), a public school district in Idaho, US
- D. 93, Song cycle Don Gayseros by Franz Schubert
