= Ammon, Idaho =

- City
- City of Ammon
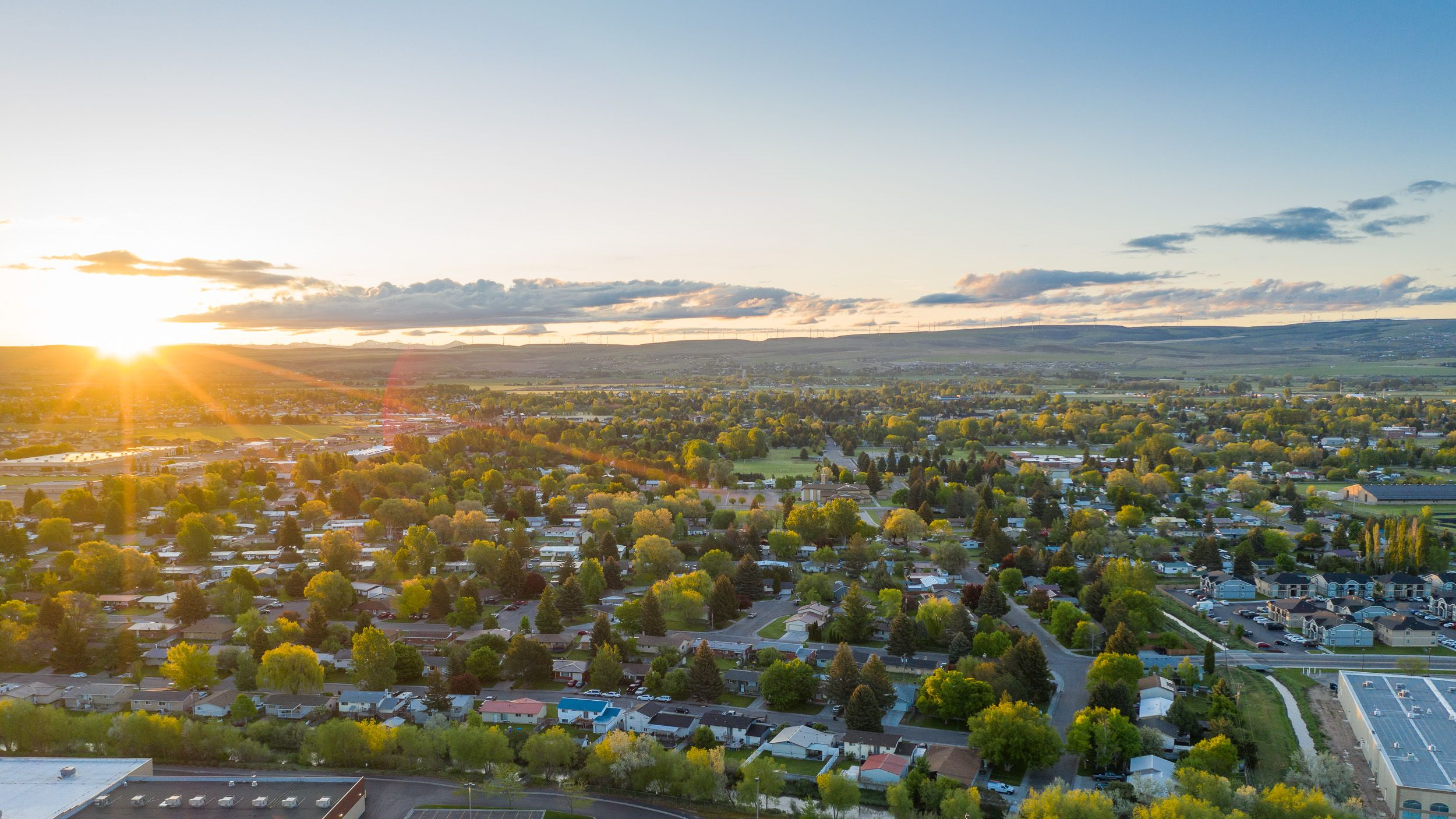
- View of Ammon looking towards the foothills
- Motto: "The City Where Tomorrow Begins"
- Location of Ammon in Bonneville County, Idaho.
- Coordinates: 43°29′25″N 111°57′45″W
- Country: United States
- State: Idaho
- County: Bonneville
- Incorporated: 1905

Government
  - Type: Mayor–council government
  - Mayor: Brian Powell

Area
  - Total: 7.61 sq mi (19.70 km^{2})
  - Land: 7.59 sq mi (19.67 km^{2})
  - Water: 0.012 sq mi (0.03 km^{2})
- Elevation: 4,718 ft (1,438 m)

Population (2020)
  - Total: 17,694
  - Density: 2,253.7/sq mi (870.17/km^{2})
- Time zone: UTC−7 (Mountain)
  - Summer (DST): UTC−6 (Mountain)
- ZIP code: 83406
- Area codes: 208, 986
- FIPS code: 16-01990
- GNIS feature ID: 2409701
- Website: cityofammon.us

Ammon is a suburb city in Bonneville County, Idaho, United States. As of the 2010 US Census, the population of Ammon was 13,816. By the 2020 census, Ammon's population had grown to 17,694. It lies directly to the east of Idaho Falls and to the west of the Ammon foothills, and is the second most populous city in the Idaho Falls metropolitan area.

As of 2020, Ammon is the 15th most populous city in Idaho. It was one of the state's fastest growing cities from 2000 to 2010, experiencing a 123.3% growth rate based on the 2010 US Census.

== History ==
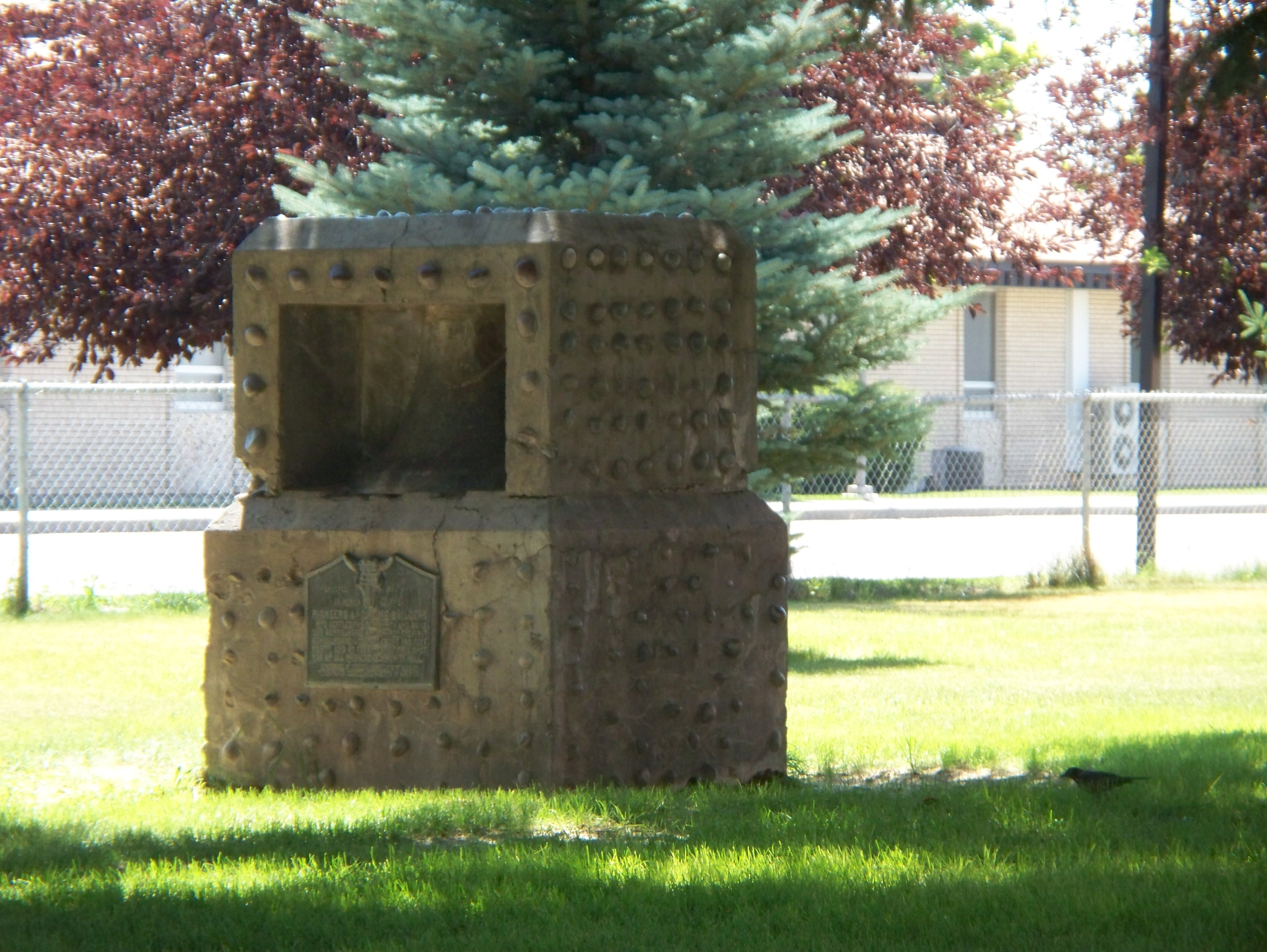
A monument erected in 1937 by local Boy Scouts honors the early settlers of Ammon

Ammon was founded by members of the Church of Jesus Christ of Latter-day Saints in 1888. It was originally called South Iona because it was the dependent branch in the south end of the Iona, Idaho ward. The area was made a ward in the church in 1889 with Arthur M. Rawson as bishop, who renamed the town in honor of Ammon, a figure in the LDS book of scripture, the Book of Mormon. Since it was now independent of the Iona Ward, a new name seemed appropriate. On February 9, 1893, the name of the town was changed from South Iona Ward to Ammon.

By 1930 the village of Ammon had 270 inhabitants, but the total district of Ammon, which is how the name is usually used and is closer to the modern borders, had a population of about 1100.

Ammon was an early agricultural center and later was home to several general stores, a grain elevator and a brickyard. The city was officially incorporated on October 10, 1905. It became a Second Class City under Idaho law in 1963. In the early 1900s a spur line was built by the Union Pacific Railroad to the Ammon Elevator. Beginning in the 1940s housing divisions have aided the city's growth and it has become a suburb for the adjacent city of Idaho Falls. Building boomed in the 1990s in both the business and housing sectors, and the city was one of the fastest growing in Idaho from 2000 to 2010.

== Geography ==
According to the United States Census Bureau, the city has a total area of 7.27 square miles (18.83 km^{2}), of which, 7.26 square miles (18.80 km^{2}) is land and 0.01 square miles (0.03 km^{2}) is water.

== Demographics ==
Historical population
Census	Pop.	Note	%±
1910	214		—
1920	378		76.6%
1930	270		−28.6%
1940	363		34.4%
1950	447		23.1%
1960	1,882		321.0%
1970	2,545		35.2%
1980	4,669		83.5%
1990	5,002		7.1%
2000	6,187		23.7%
2010	13,816		123.3%
2020	17,694		28.1%
U.S. Decennial Census

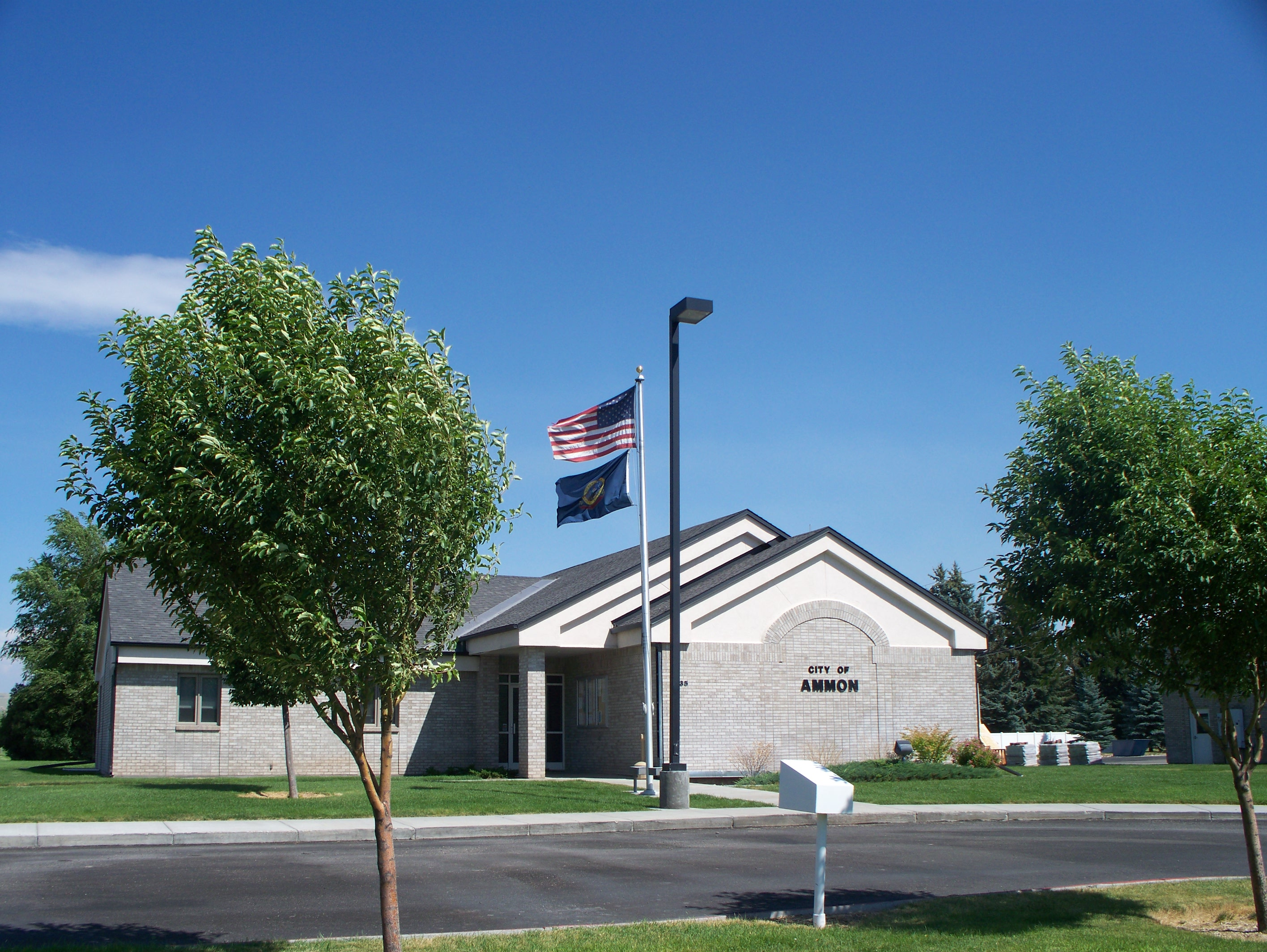
Ammon City Building

=== 2020 census ===
As of the 2020 census, Ammon had a population of 17,694. The median age was 30.8 years. 33.8% of residents were under the age of 18 and 12.5% of residents were 65 years of age or older. For every 100 females there were 95.0 males, and for every 100 females age 18 and over there were 90.6 males age 18 and over.

98.5% of residents lived in urban areas, while 1.5% lived in rural areas.

There were 5,723 households in Ammon, of which 42.7% had children under the age of 18 living in them. Of all households, 59.5% were married-couple households, 12.9% were households with a male householder and no spouse or partner present, and 23.1% were households with a female householder and no spouse or partner present. About 21.9% of all households were made up of individuals and 9.2% had someone living alone who was 65 years of age or older.

There were 6,000 housing units, of which 4.6% were vacant. The homeowner vacancy rate was 1.0% and the rental vacancy rate was 5.4%.

Racial composition as of the 2020 census
Race	Number	Percent
White	15,525	87.7%
Black or African American	66	0.4%
American Indian and Alaska Native	121	0.7%
Asian	265	1.5%
Native Hawaiian and Other Pacific Islander	22	0.1%
Some other race	566	3.2%
Two or more races	1,129	6.4%
Hispanic or Latino (of any race)	1,574	8.9%

=== 2010 census ===
As of the census of 2010, there were 13,816 people, 4,476 households, and 3,352 families residing in the city. The population density was 1,903.0 inhabitants per square mile (734.8/km^{2}). There were 4,747 housing units at an average density of 653.9 per square mile (252.5/km^{2}). The racial makeup of the city was 94.1% White, 0.5% African American, 0.5% Native American, 0.8% Asian, 0.1% Pacific Islander, 2.2% from other races, and 1.8% from two or more races. Hispanic or Latino of any race were 6.4% of the population.

There were 4,476 households, of which 46.4% had children under the age of 18 living with them, 61.4% were married couples living together, 10.1% had a female householder with no husband present, 3.4% had a male householder with no wife present, and 25.1% were non-families. 21.3% of all households were made up of individuals, and 8.2% had someone living alone who was 65 years of age or older. The average household size was 3.05 and the average family size was 3.61.

The median age in the city was 29.6 years. 36.3% of residents were under the age of 18; 7.7% were between the ages of 18 and 24; 27.5% were from 25 to 44; 18.7% were from 45 to 64; and 9.8% were 65 years of age or older. The gender makeup of the city was 48.9% male and 51.1% female.

=== 2000 census ===
As of the 2000 Census there were 1,843 households, out of which 49.9% had children under the age of 18 living with them, 72.0% were married couples living together, 9.4% had a female householder with no husband present, and 16.1% were non-families. 13.8% of all households were made up of individuals, and 6.3% had someone living alone who was 65 years of age or older. The average household size was 3.27 and the average family size was 3.62.

In 2000 the city the population was spread out, with 36.3% under the age of 18, 8.9% from 18 to 24, 26.8% from 25 to 44, 18.4% from 45 to 64, and 9.6% who were 65 years of age or older. The median age was 29 years. For every 100 females, there were 97.0 males. For every 100 females age 18 and over, there were 89.6 males.

The median income for a household in the city in 2000 was $47,820, and the median income for a family was $51,544. Males had a median income of $41,126 versus $21,301 for females. The per capita income for the city was $16,535. About 3.4% of families and 5.6% of the population were below the poverty line, including 5.0% of those under age 18 and 9.6% of those age 65 or over.

== Education ==
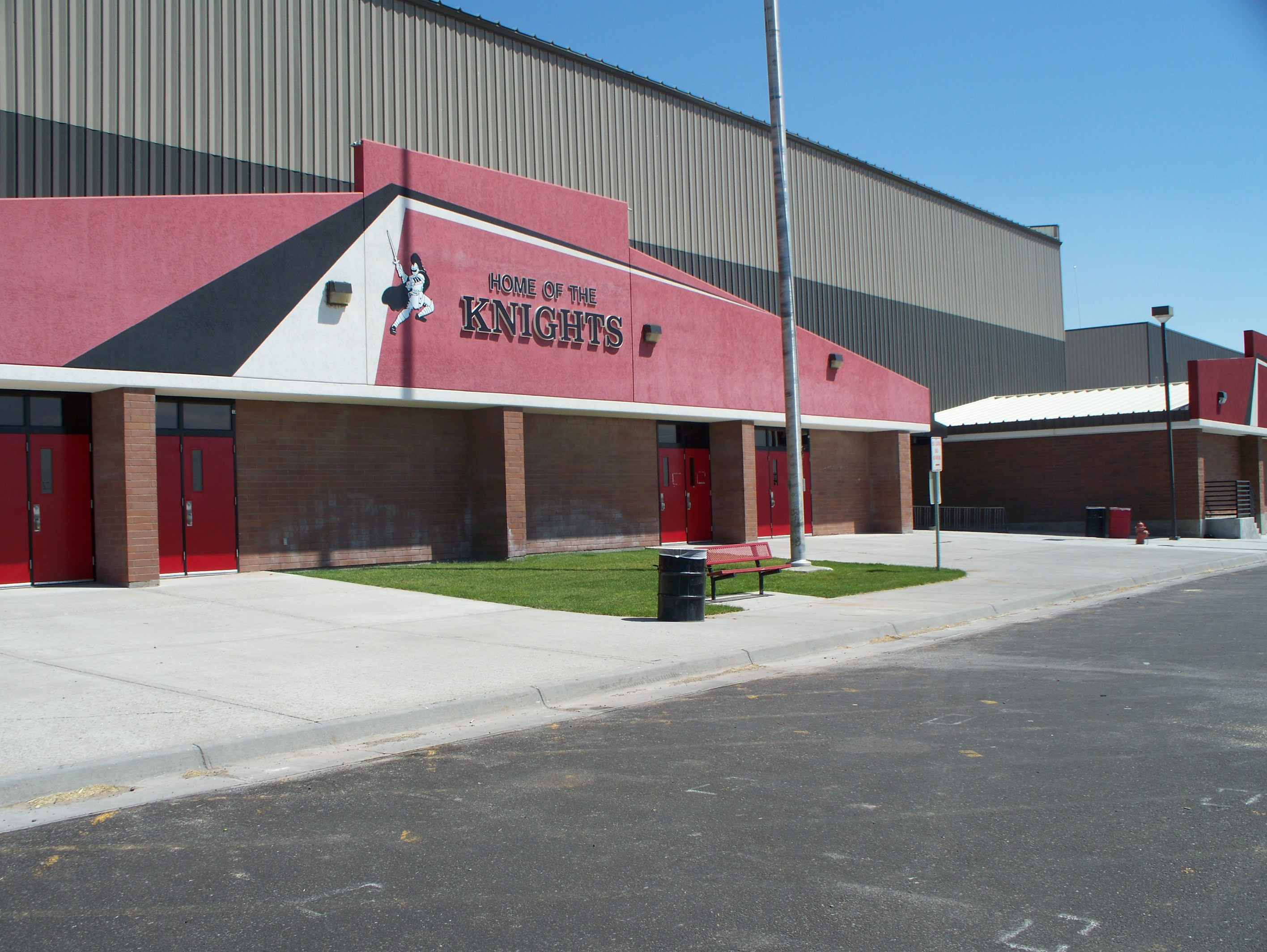
The west entrance to Hillcrest High School

Ammon is served by the Bonneville Joint School District #93. District #93 serves about 10,758 students in 19 schools, making it the fifth-largest by enrollment in the state of Idaho. The district has 14 elementary schools serving students in K–6, three middle schools serving students in grades 7–8, and three high schools serving students in grades 9–12, along with an alternative high school.

Elementary schools in the city limits:

- Ammon Elementary School
- Bridgewater Elementary School
- Hillview Elementary School
- Mountain Valley Elementary School
- Rimrock Elementary School
- Tiebreaker Elementary School
- Woodland Hills Elementary School

Secondary schools in the city limits:

- Sandcreek Middle School
- Hillcrest High School

Some portions of Ammon are zoned to other sets of secondary schools: Rocky Mountain Middle School and Bonneville High School, and Black Canyon Middle School and Thunder Ridge High School.

== Infrastructure ==
=== Fiber Optics ===
Ammon builds, owns, and operates a fiber-to-the-premises system. Ammon provides the fiber to the premises, and relies on third party ISPs to connect customers to the Internet and other services.
