= Irwin, Idaho =

- City
- Location of Irwin in Bonneville County, Idaho.
- Coordinates: 43°23′18″N 111°15′05″W
- Country: United States
- State: Idaho
- County: Bonneville

Area
  - Total: 2.47 sq mi (6.40 km^{2})
  - Land: 2.47 sq mi (6.40 km^{2})
  - Water: 0 sq mi (0.00 km^{2})
- Elevation: 5,335 ft (1,626 m)

Population (2020)
  - Total: 259
  - Estimate (2019): 247
  - Density: 100.0/sq mi (38.61/km^{2})
- Time zone: UTC-7 (Mountain (MST))
  - Summer (DST): UTC-6 (MDT)
- ZIP code: 83428
- Area codes: 208, 986
- FIPS code: 16-40510
- GNIS feature ID: 2410118
- Website: www.cityofirwin.com

Irwin is a city in Bonneville County, Idaho, United States. It is part of the Idaho Falls, Idaho Metropolitan Statistical Area. The population was 259 at the 2020 census, and 219 at the 2010 census.

== Geography ==
According to the United States Census Bureau, the city has a total area of 2.45 square miles (6.35 km^{2}), all of it land.

== Demographics ==
Historical population
Census	Pop.	Note	%±
1950	147		—
1960	330		124.5%
1970	228		−30.9%
1980	113		−50.4%
1990	108		−4.4%
2000	157		45.4%
2010	219		39.5%
2020	259		18.3%
2019 (est.)	247		12.8%
U.S. Decennial Census

=== 2010 census ===
As of the census of 2010, there were 219 people, 103 households, and 70 families residing in the city. The population density was 89.4 inhabitants per square mile (34.5/km^{2}). There were 166 housing units at an average density of 67.8 per square mile (26.2/km^{2}). The racial makeup of the city was 99.1% White, 0.5% Asian, and 0.5% from two or more races. Hispanic or Latino of any race were 0.5% of the population.

There were 103 households, of which 15.5% had children under the age of 18 living with them, 62.1% were married couples living together, 4.9% had a female householder with no husband present, 1.0% had a male householder with no wife present, and 32.0% were non-families. 25.2% of all households were made up of individuals, and 9.7% had someone living alone who was 65 years of age or older. The average household size was 2.13 and the average family size was 2.53.

The median age in the city was 52.4 years. 11.9% of residents were under the age of 18; 5.1% were between the ages of 18 and 24; 21% were from 25 to 44; 38.4% were from 45 to 64; and 23.7% were 65 years of age or older. The gender makeup of the city was 51.6% male and 48.4% female.

=== 2000 census ===
As of the census of 2000, there were 157 people, 71 households, and 47 families residing in the city. The population density was 73.8 inhabitants per square mile (28.5/km^{2}). There were 125 housing units at an average density of 58.8 per square mile (22.7/km^{2}). The racial makeup of the city was 98.09% White, 0.64% Asian, 1.27% from other races. Hispanic or Latino of any race were 1.91% of the population.

There were 71 households, out of which 22.5% had children under the age of 18 living with them, 60.6% were married couples living together, 2.8% had a female householder with no husband present, and 32.4% were non-families. 31.0% of all households were made up of individuals, and 15.5% had someone living alone who was 65 years of age or older. The average household size was 2.21 and the average family size was 2.73.

In the city, the population was spread out, with 19.1% under the age of 18, 5.7% from 18 to 24, 17.2% from 25 to 44, 34.4% from 45 to 64, and 23.6% who were 65 years of age or older. The median age was 48 years. For every 100 females, there were 109.3 males. For every 100 females age 18 and over, there were 98.4 males.

The median income for a household in the city was $31,250, and the median income for a family was $42,813. Males had a median income of $28,333 versus $27,250 for females. The per capita income for the city was $17,896. About 3.5% of families and 9.7% of the population were below the poverty line, including 23.4% of those under the age of eighteen and none of those 65 or over.
