= Swan Valley, Idaho =

- City
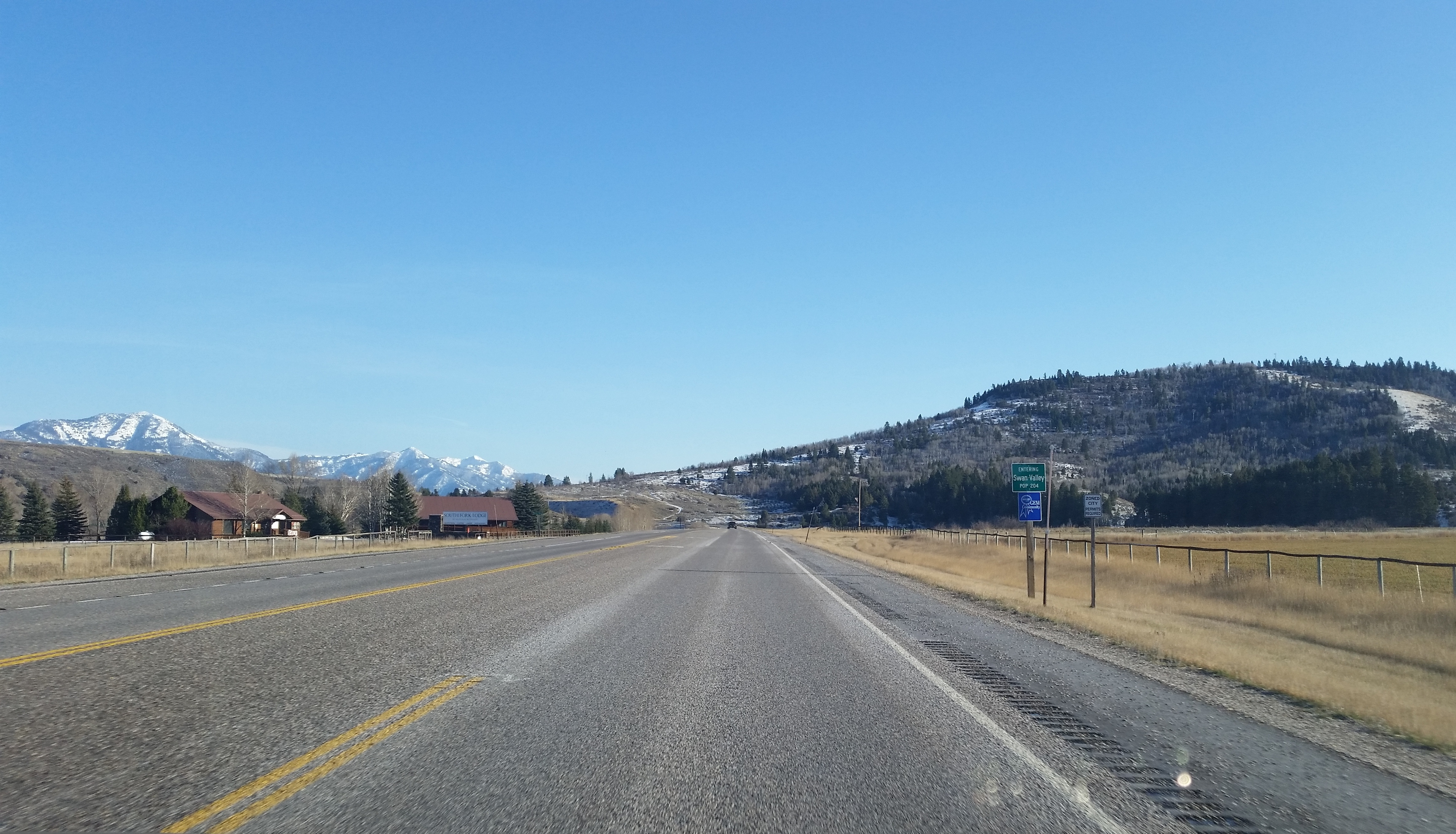
- U.S. Route 26, entering Swan Valley, ID

- Location of Swan Valley in Bonneville County, Idaho.
- Coordinates: 43°27′05″N 111°22′34″W
- Country: United States
- State: Idaho
- County: Bonneville

Area
  - Total: 11.66 sq mi (30.19 km^{2})
  - Land: 11.48 sq mi (29.73 km^{2})
  - Water: 0.17 sq mi (0.45 km^{2})
- Elevation: 5,282 ft (1,610 m)

Population (2020)
  - Total: 225
  - Density: 19.6/sq mi (7.57/km^{2})
- Time zone: UTC-7 (Mountain (MST))
  - Summer (DST): UTC-6 (MDT)
- ZIP code: 83449
- Area codes: 208, 986
- FIPS code: 16-79120
- GNIS feature ID: 2412020
- Website: www.cityofswanvalley.com

Swan Valley is a city in Bonneville County, Idaho, United States. It is part of the Idaho Falls, Idaho Metropolitan Statistical Area. The population was 225 at the 2020 census.

== Geography ==
According to the United States Census Bureau, the city has a total area of 11.62 square miles (30.10 km^{2}), of which, 11.51 square miles (29.81 km^{2}) is land and 0.11 square miles (0.28 km^{2}) is water.

=== Climate ===
According to the Köppen Climate Classification system, Swan Valley has a warm-summer humid continental climate, abbreviated "Dfb" on climate maps. The hottest temperature recorded in Swan Valley, was 104 °F (40.0 °C) on July 13, 2026, while the coldest temperature recorded was −45 °F (−42.8 °C) on February 9, 1933.

Climate data for Swan Valley, Idaho, 1991–2020 normals, extremes 1909–present (Note: IRWIN 2 SE 1909–1960, SWAN VALLEY 1960–PRESENT)
Month	Jan	Feb	Mar	Apr	May	Jun	Jul	Aug	Sep	Oct	Nov	Dec	Year
Record high °F (°C)	58 (14)	60 (16)	81 (27)	83 (28)	91 (33)	101 (38)	104 (40)	102 (39)	103 (39)	89 (32)	72 (22)	59 (15)	104 (40)
Mean maximum °F (°C)	42.4 (5.8)	47.6 (8.7)	59.3 (15.2)	73.3 (22.9)	80.5 (26.9)	87.4 (30.8)	93.8 (34.3)	93.1 (33.9)	87.6 (30.9)	76.0 (24.4)	60.0 (15.6)	45.1 (7.3)	95.2 (35.1)
Mean daily maximum °F (°C)	30.4 (−0.9)	34.7 (1.5)	45.0 (7.2)	56.1 (13.4)	65.9 (18.8)	74.9 (23.8)	84.9 (29.4)	84.2 (29.0)	74.5 (23.6)	59.3 (15.2)	43.0 (6.1)	31.6 (−0.2)	57.0 (13.9)
Daily mean °F (°C)	20.7 (−6.3)	24.2 (−4.3)	33.3 (0.7)	41.6 (5.3)	50.3 (10.2)	57.8 (14.3)	65.3 (18.5)	64.2 (17.9)	55.9 (13.3)	43.9 (6.6)	31.6 (−0.2)	22.0 (−5.6)	42.6 (5.9)
Mean daily minimum °F (°C)	11.0 (−11.7)	13.8 (−10.1)	21.5 (−5.8)	27.2 (−2.7)	34.6 (1.4)	40.7 (4.8)	45.8 (7.7)	44.2 (6.8)	37.4 (3.0)	28.5 (−1.9)	20.3 (−6.5)	12.4 (−10.9)	28.1 (−2.2)
Mean minimum °F (°C)	−12.1 (−24.5)	−6.9 (−21.6)	4.2 (−15.4)	16.2 (−8.8)	22.7 (−5.2)	30.8 (−0.7)	36.9 (2.7)	34.7 (1.5)	26.0 (−3.3)	14.8 (−9.6)	2.8 (−16.2)	−8.3 (−22.4)	−16.4 (−26.9)
Record low °F (°C)	−43 (−42)	−45 (−43)	−28 (−33)	−5 (−21)	12 (−11)	20 (−7)	26 (−3)	20 (−7)	8 (−13)	−5 (−21)	−27 (−33)	−43 (−42)	−45 (−43)
Average precipitation inches (mm)	1.85 (47)	1.32 (34)	1.54 (39)	1.88 (48)	2.53 (64)	2.07 (53)	1.25 (32)	1.25 (32)	1.55 (39)	1.81 (46)	1.59 (40)	1.44 (37)	20.08 (511)
Average snowfall inches (cm)	16.7 (42)	9.1 (23)	4.4 (11)	1.6 (4.1)	0.2 (0.51)	0.0 (0.0)	0.0 (0.0)	0.0 (0.0)	0.0 (0.0)	0.5 (1.3)	4.0 (10)	8.5 (22)	45.0 (114)
Average precipitation days (≥ 0.01 in)	9.9	8.9	10.2	12.1	13.0	10.1	7.9	7.8	7.6	8.3	8.5	9.3	113.6
Average snowy days (≥ 0.1 in)	6.4	3.8	1.7	0.8	0.0	0.0	0.0	0.0	0.0	0.2	1.9	4.8	19.6
Source 1: NOAA
Source 2: National Weather Service

== Demographics ==
Historical population
Census	Pop.	Note	%±
1950	203		—
1960	217		6.9%
1970	235		8.3%
1980	135		−42.6%
1990	141		4.4%
2000	213		51.1%
2010	204		−4.2%
2020	225		10.3%
U.S. Decennial Census

=== 2010 census ===
As of the census of 2010, there were 204 people, 92 households, and 66 families living in the city. The population density was 17.7 inhabitants per square mile (6.8/km^{2}). There were 135 housing units at an average density of 11.7 per square mile (4.5/km^{2}). The racial makeup of the city was 96.6% White, 1.0% Native American, 0.5% Asian, 1.5% from other races, and 0.5% from two or more races. Hispanic or Latino of any race were 1.5% of the population.

There were 92 households, of which 20.7% had children under the age of 18 living with them, 65.2% were married couples living together, 3.3% had a female householder with no husband present, 3.3% had a male householder with no wife present, and 28.3% were non-families. 26.1% of all households were made up of individuals, and 14.2% had someone living alone who was 65 years of age or older. The average household size was 2.22 and the average family size was 2.67.

The median age in the city was 47.8 years. 18.1% of residents were under the age of 18; 4.4% were between the ages of 18 and 24; 21.5% were from 25 to 44; 35.3% were from 45 to 64; and 20.6% were 65 years of age or older. The gender makeup of the city was 50.0% male and 50.0% female.

=== 2000 census ===
As of the census of 2000, there were 213 people, 79 households, and 57 families living in the city. The population density was 20.7 people per square mile (8.0 people/km^{2}). There were 117 housing units at an average density of 11.4 per square mile (4.4/km^{2}). The racial makeup of the city was 91.08% White, 0.47% Native American, 0.47% Asian, 1.41% from other races, and 6.57% from two or more races. Hispanic or Latino of any race were 2.35% of the population.

There were 79 households, out of which 26.6% had children under the age of 18 living with them, 69.6% were married couples living together, 1.3% had a female householder with no husband present, and 26.6% were non-families. 19.0% of all households were made up of individuals, and 11.4% had someone living alone who was 65 years of age or older. The average household size was 2.70 and the average family size was 3.16.

In the city, the population was spread out, with 25.8% under the age of 18, 4.2% from 18 to 24, 23.5% from 25 to 44, 27.7% from 45 to 64, and 18.8% who were 65 years of age or older. The median age was 40 years. For every 100 females, there were 97.2 males. For every 100 females age 18 and over, there were 113.5 males.

The median income for a household in the city was $37,083, and the median income for a family was $41,071. Males had a median income of $37,083 versus $17,813 for females. The per capita income for the city was $18,527. About 3.8% of families and 9.2% of the population were below the poverty line, including 14.3% of those under the age of eighteen and 5.7% of those 65 or over.

== Trivia ==
- According to an 1868 account, a monster simply dubbed the Swan Valley Monster was sighted in the Snake River.

== See also ==
- List of cities in Idaho
