= Ucon, Idaho =

Ucon, Idaho The UConn with one n
- City
- Location of Ucon in Bonneville County, Idaho.
- Coordinates: 43°35′37″N 111°57′33″W
- Country: United States
- State: Idaho
- County: Bonneville

Area
  - Total: 0.80 sq mi (2.07 km^{2})
  - Land: 0.80 sq mi (2.07 km^{2})
  - Water: 0 sq mi (0.00 km^{2})
- Elevation: 4,813 ft (1,467 m)

Population (2020)
  - Total: 1,160
  - Density: 1,450/sq mi (560/km^{2})
- Time zone: UTC-7 (Mountain (MST))
  - Summer (DST): UTC-6 (MDT)
- ZIP code: 83454
- Area codes: 208, 986
- FIPS code: 16-83350
- GNIS feature ID: 2412123
- Website: www.cityofucon.us

Ucon is a city in Bonneville County, Idaho, United States. It is part of the Idaho Falls, Idaho Metropolitan Statistical Area. The population was 1,160 at the 2020 census. Ucon was first settled in 1883.

== Geography ==
According to the United States Census Bureau, the city has a total area of 0.79 square miles (2.05 km^{2}), all of it land.

== Education ==
Ucon is served by the Bonneville Joint School District #93, with Ucon Elementary School within city limits. Students are bused to Rocky Mountain Middle School, and Bonneville High School.

== Demographics ==
Historical population
Census	Pop.	Note	%±
1920	364		—
1930	349		−4.1%
1940	449		28.7%
1950	356		−20.7%
1960	532		49.4%
1970	664		24.8%
1980	833		25.5%
1990	895		7.4%
2000	943		5.4%
2010	1,108		17.5%
2020	1,160		4.7%
U.S. Decennial Census

=== 2020 census ===
As of the 2020 census, Ucon had a population of 1,160. The median age was 30.3 years. 32.0% of residents were under the age of 18 and 10.9% of residents were 65 years of age or older. For every 100 females there were 101.7 males, and for every 100 females age 18 and over there were 95.3 males age 18 and over.

0.0% of residents lived in urban areas, while 100.0% lived in rural areas.

There were 359 households in Ucon, of which 44.6% had children under the age of 18 living in them. Of all households, 69.4% were married-couple households, 11.1% were households with a male householder and no spouse or partner present, and 15.0% were households with a female householder and no spouse or partner present. About 13.3% of all households were made up of individuals and 6.1% had someone living alone who was 65 years of age or older.

There were 381 housing units, of which 5.8% were vacant. The homeowner vacancy rate was 1.3% and the rental vacancy rate was 6.3%.

Racial composition as of the 2020 census
Race	Number	Percent
White	1,065	91.8%
Black or African American	6	0.5%
American Indian and Alaska Native	8	0.7%
Asian	5	0.4%
Native Hawaiian and Other Pacific Islander	0	0.0%
Some other race	16	1.4%
Two or more races	60	5.2%
Hispanic or Latino (of any race)	70	6.0%

=== 2010 census ===
As of the census of 2010, there were 1,108 people, 336 households, and 277 families residing in the city. The population density was 1,402.5 inhabitants per square mile (541.5/km^{2}). There were 368 housing units at an average density of 465.8 per square mile (179.8/km^{2}). The racial makeup of the city was 95.9% White, 0.1% Asian, 0.3% Pacific Islander, 2.3% from other races, and 1.4% from two or more races. Hispanic or Latino of any race were 6.0% of the population.

There were 336 households, of which 50.3% had children under the age of 18 living with them, 67.3% were married couples living together, 11.6% had a female householder with no husband present, 3.6% had a male householder with no wife present, and 17.6% were non-families. 14.6% of all households were made up of individuals, and 6.6% had someone living alone who was 65 years of age or older. The average household size was 3.30 and the average family size was 3.69.

The median age in the city was 28.6 years. 38.1% of residents were under the age of 18; 7.6% were between the ages of 18 and 24; 25.2% were from 25 to 44; 19.6% were from 45 to 64; and 9.6% were 65 years of age or older. The gender makeup of the city was 53.1% male and 46.9% female.

=== 2000 census ===
As of the census of 2000, there were 943 people, 280 households, and 236 families residing in the city. The population density was 1,230.3 inhabitants per square mile (475.0/km^{2}). There were 288 housing units at an average density of 375.7 per square mile (145.1/km^{2}). The racial makeup of the city was 95.33% White, 0.11% African American, 0.42% Native American, 2.44% from other races, and 1.70% from two or more races. Hispanic or Latino of any race were 4.14% of the population.

There were 280 households, out of which 43.9% had children under the age of 18 living with them, 74.6% were married couples living together, 7.9% had a female householder with no husband present, and 15.7% were non-families. 12.9% of all households were made up of individuals, and 4.3% had someone living alone who was 65 years of age or older. The average household size was 3.30 and the average family size was 3.62.

In the city, the population was spread out, with 34.7% under the age of 18, 9.4% from 18 to 24, 25.8% from 25 to 44, 22.4% from 45 to 64, and 7.7% who were 65 years of age or older. The median age was 32 years. For every 100 females, there were 111.4 males. For every 100 females age 18 and over, there were 102.0 males.

The median income for a household in the city was $39,375, and the median income for a family was $41,250. Males had a median income of $30,809 versus $19,911 for females. The per capita income for the city was $12,964. About 7.2% of families and 9.8% of the population were below the poverty line, including 14.6% of those under age 18 and 9.8% of those age 65 or over.

== Notable people ==
- N. M. Jorgensen, football coach
- Dean Mortimer, member of the Idaho Senate (raised in Ucon)
