= Beachs Corner, Idaho =

Unincorporated community in the state of Idaho, United States

- Unincorporated community
- Location within Idaho Location within the United States
- Coordinates: 43°32′33″N 111°57′51″W
- Country: United States
- State: Idaho
- County: Bonneville
- Elevation: 4,790 ft (1,460 m)
- Time zone: UTC-7 (Mountain (MST))
  - Summer (DST): UTC-6 (MDT)
- Area codes: 208, 986
- GNIS feature ID: 397415

Beachs Corner is an unincorporated community in Bonneville County, Idaho, United States. Beachs Corner is located at the junction of U.S. Route 26 and Idaho State Highway 43 5 miles (8.0 km) northeast of Idaho Falls. It is named after Aaron Williams Beach 1847-1912 who owned a farm there. His home was located on the opposite corner lot South across the Yellowstone Highway. The farmland was Northwest on the other side of the highway.
