= Osgood, Idaho =

Unincorporated community in the state of Idaho, United States

Coordinates: 43°34′13″N 112°06′11″W

Osgood is an unincorporated community near Idaho Falls in Bonneville County, Idaho, United States. It is part of the Idaho Falls, Idaho Metropolitan Statistical Area.

== History ==
In the 19th century, the site of present-day Osgood was known as Eagle Rock, and it was the location of an important ferry crossing of the Snake River. The name came from an isolated basalt island in the Snake River that was the nesting site for approximately twenty eagles. However, the name Eagle Rock eventually migrated downstream to the town that today is known as Idaho Falls, and at that point the ferry crossing site became known as Payne.

Shortly thereafter, the Osgood Canal was built nearby as a means to harness the irrigation capability of the nearby Snake River and expand agricultural production, and the community assumed that name, which it retains to the present day.

== Transportation tourism ==
In 1972, a Boy Scout from Idaho Falls constructed a small monument on the west shore of the river, within sight of Eagle Rock. The location is visited by fishermen, hunters, and photographers.

The community is easily accessed by exit 128 of Interstate 15 and is due north of Fanning Field, the airport which serves Idaho Falls.
