= N. M. Jorgensen =

American football administrator

Biographical details
- Born: October 23, 1909; Ucon, Idaho, U.S.
- Died: January 11, 1988 (aged 78); Greenville, North Carolina, U.S.

Coaching career (HC unless noted)
- 1939–1940: Defiance

Administrative career (AD unless noted)
- 1947–1963: East Carolina

Head coaching record
- Overall: 1–11–1

Nephi Moroni Jorgensen (October 23, 1909 – January 11, 1988) was an American football coach and college athletic administrator. He served as the head football coach at Defiance College in Defiance, Ohio from 1939 to 1940. In 1947 Dr. Jorgensen became the first athletic director at East Carolina Teachers College, which later became East Carolina University .He served in this position until 1963. He was inducted into the first class of the ECU Athletics Hall of Fame in 1974.

== Head coaching record ==
Year	Team	Overall	Conference	Standing	Bowl/playoffs
Defiance Yellow Jackets (Independent) (1939–1940)
1939	Defiance	0–6			
1940	Defiance	1–5–1			
Defiance:		1–11–1			
Total:		1–11–1			
