= Idaho Falls metropolitan area =

Coordinates: 43°30′N 112°03′W

Idaho Falls Metropolitan Area
- Metropolitan Statistical Area
- Idaho Falls, ID Metropolitan Statistical Area
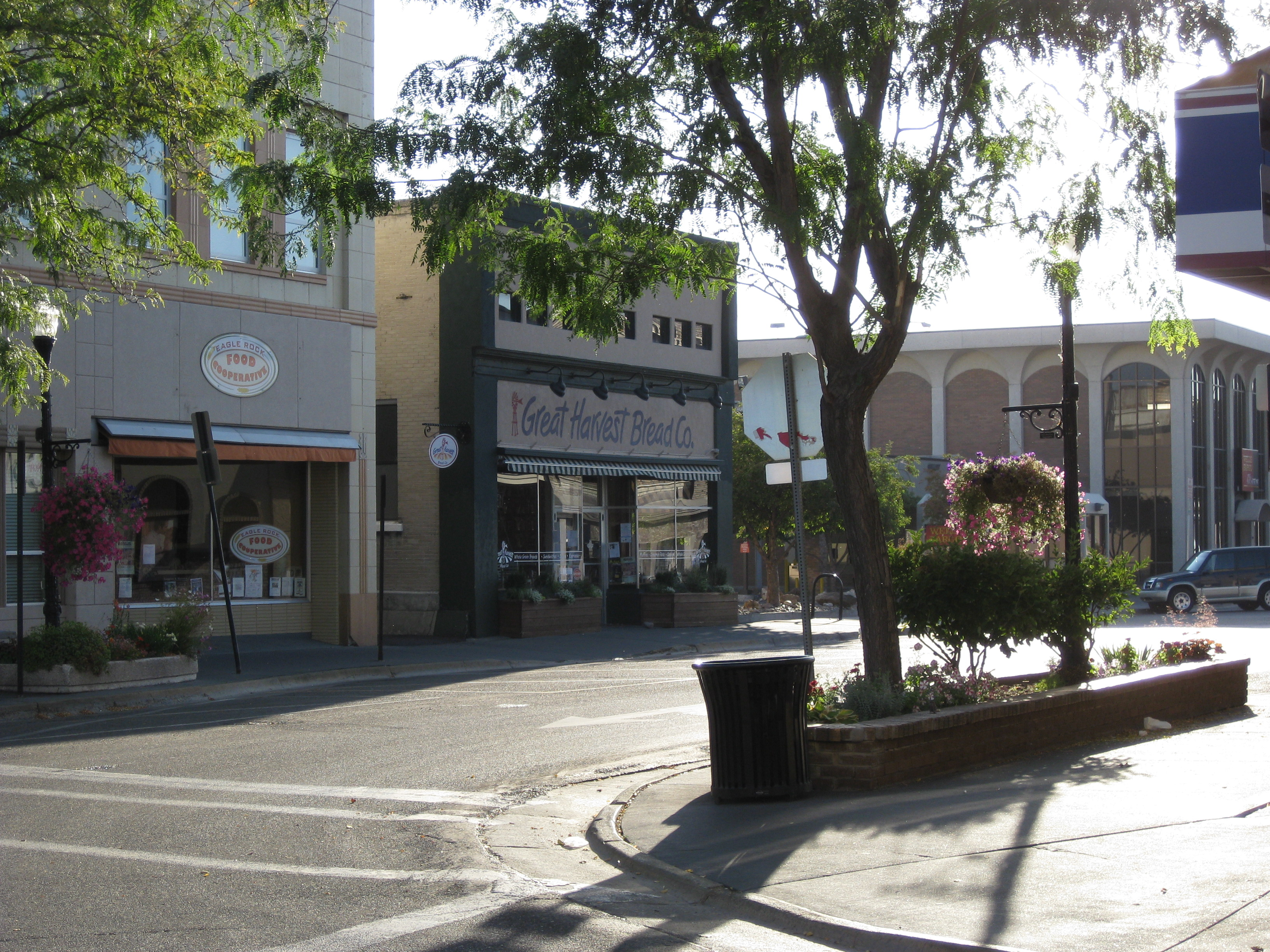
- Downtown Idaho Falls
Interactive Map of Idaho Falls–Rexburg–
Blackfoot, ID CSA
City of Idaho Falls
Idaho Falls, ID MSA
City of Rexburg
Rexburg, ID µSA
City of Blackfoot
Blackfoot, ID µSA
- Country: United States
- State: Idaho
- Largest City: Idaho Falls
- Other Cities: Ammon; Rexburg; Blackfoot
- Time zone: UTC-7 (MST)
  - Summer (DST): UTC-6 (MDT)

The Idaho Falls Metropolitan Statistical Area, as defined by the United States Census Bureau, is an area consisting of three counties in eastern Idaho, anchored by the city of Idaho Falls. As of the 2020 census, the MSA had a population of 154,855. It is just north of the Pocatello, Idaho Metropolitan Area.

== Counties ==
- Bingham
- Bonneville
- Butte
- Jefferson

== Communities ==
- Places with more than 50,000 inhabitants
  - Idaho Falls (Principal City)
- Places with 10,000 to 50,000 inhabitants
  - Ammon
  - Blackfoot
- Places with 1,000 to 10,000 inhabitants
  - Iona
  - Rigby
  - Ucon
- Places with 500 to 1,000 inhabitants
  - Menan
  - Ririe
  - Roberts
- Places with fewer than 500 inhabitants
  - Hamer
  - Irwin
  - Lewisville
  - Mud Lake
  - Swan Valley
- Unincorporated places
  - Osgood
  - Lincoln

== Demographics ==
As of the census of 2000, there were 101,677 people, 34,654 households, and 26,329 families residing within the MSA. The racial makeup of the MSA was 92.43% White, 0.45% African American, 0.61% Native American, 0.71% Asian, 0.07% Pacific Islander, 4.29% from other races, and 1.44% from two or more races. Hispanic or Latino of any race were 7.48% of the population.

The median income for a household in the MSA was $39,796, and the median income for a family was $44,873. Males had a median income of $35,022 versus $21,135 for females. The per capita income for the MSA was $16,082.

== Combined Statistical Area ==
The Idaho Falls–Rexburg–Blackfoot Combined Statistical Area is made up of three counties in eastern Idaho. The statistical area includes one metropolitan area and two micropolitan areas. As of the 2020 Census, the CSA had a population of 271,722.

=== Components ===
- Metropolitan Statistical Area (MSA)
  - Idaho Falls (Bonneville, Butte, and Jefferson counties)
- Micropolitan Statistical Areas (μSAs)
  - Rexburg (Fremont County and Madison County)
  - Blackfoot (Bingham County)

=== Demographics ===
As of the census of 2000, there were 143,412 people, 47,971 households, and 37,035 families residing within the CSA. The racial makeup of the CSA was 89.52% White, 0.37% African American, 2.39% Native American, 0.67% Asian, 0.06% Pacific Islander, 5.36% from other races, and 1.64% from two or more races. Hispanic or Latino of any race were 9.18% of the population.

The median income for a household in the CSA was $38,672, and the median income for a family was $43,353. Males had a median income of $33,998 versus $21,287 for females. The per capita income for the CSA was $15,510.

== See also ==
- Idaho census statistical areas
