= Hillcrest High School (Idaho) =

Location
- 2800 Owen Street; Ammon, Idaho; United States; 43°28′16″N 111°58′37″W

Information
- Type: Public
- Established: 1992
- School district: Bonneville Joint School District#93
- Principal: Tyrell Salsbery
- Teaching staff: 50.71 (FTE)
- Grades: 9–12
- Enrollment: 1,207 (2023–2024)
- Student to teacher ratio: 23.80
- Colors: Red, Black, & White
- Athletics: IHSAA Class 5A
- Athletics conference: High Country (4A)
- Nickname: Knight
- Rival: Bonneville
- Newspaper: The Knight Times
- Yearbook: Excalibur
- Feeder schools: Sandcreek Middle School
- Elevation: 4,710 ft (1,440 m) AMSL
- Website: www.hillcrestknights.com

Hillcrest High School is a four-year public high school in Ammon, Idaho, east of Idaho Falls. Opened in 1992, it was the second high school in the Bonneville School District. The school mascot is the Knight and the colors are red, black, and white. Hillcrest competed in IHSAA Class 5A for athletics until 2018, then competed in 4A until the IHSAA changed classifications for the 2024/2025 school year. They now compete at the Class 5A level. The principal is Tyrell Salsbery.

== School history ==
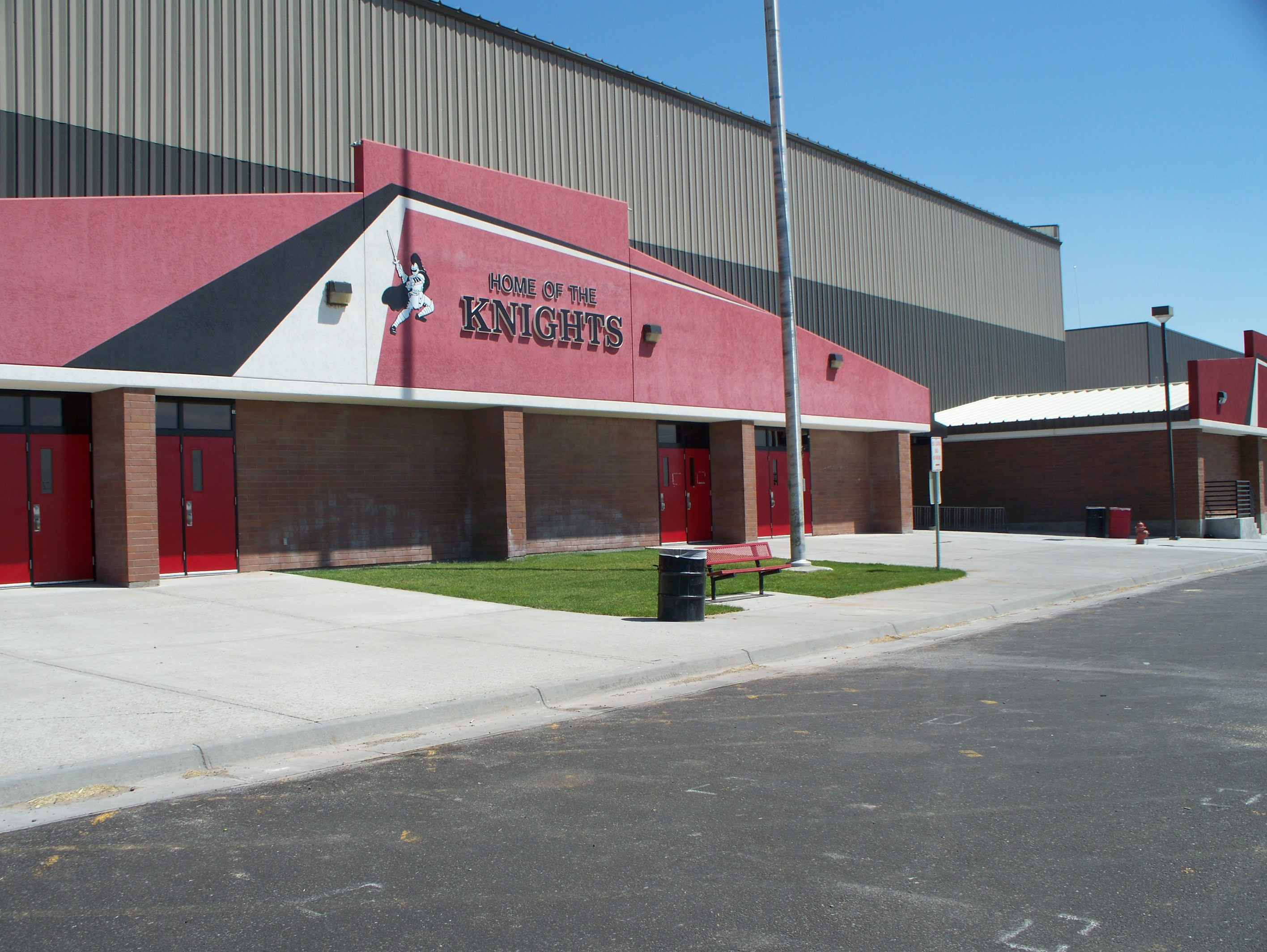
The West Entrance to Hillcrest High School

In the late 1980s and early 1990s, overcrowding at Bonneville High School and a rising population in the southern end of Bonneville School District #93 proved a need for a second school within the district's boundaries. The passage of a bond issue in 1990 in the amount of $10,880,000 provided the financial means for constructing Hillcrest High School, along with Iona Elementary School and a major addition to Falls Valley Elementary School. Students started classes in August 1992 in grades nine through twelve. Some areas were not completed when the school opened, including the gym. The property adjoins the property of Sandcreek Middle School and makes an acceptable middle school/high school campus configuration.

== Academics ==
Hillcrest offers a variety of scholastic opportunities for students. The school offers foreign language courses in German, Italian, Spanish, and French. It also offers at least 9 different Advanced Placement classes: Calculus, Statistics, World History, U.S. Government, U.S. History, Economics, Physics, English Literature, and English Composition. Hillcrest also affords students the opportunity to participate in vocational/technical courses in conjunction with Bonneville High School and Eastern Idaho Technical College. These courses include drafting, woodworking, metalworking, electronics, auto body, auto tech, welding, cabinet making, robotics, family science, and a Certified Nursing Program. Hillcrest sponsors an ACT preparation course in the spring and fall.

Hillcrest had a graduation rate of 98.39% for the 2006–2007 school year, above the district average of 97.41% and the national average of about 70%.

As of 2018, the student–teacher ratio was 21, a little above the state average of 18.

== Building ==
Hillcrest High School is composed of an upper and lower gym, cafeteria/commons, media center, vocational and regular classrooms, having approximately 178,000 square feet (16,500 m^{2}). The building has a maximum student capacity of approximately 1200 students.

The structure is a prefabricated metal structure. The music, speech, and drama rooms are separated from the other academic areas, as is the vocational wing. Hillcrest High School is built on 42 acres (170,000 m^{2}). The property is relatively flat, with good draining into the improved parking lot area, which further meets all United States Environmental Protection Agency requirements by draining into a lower softball field area.

A new, $5.3 million auditorium was completed in August 2007 and officially opened October 15 of that same year. The auditorium, called the Performing Arts Center (PAC) at Hillcrest, seats 883. The first performance in the PAC was a play called Our Town, put on by Hillcrest January 28–30, 2008, followed by a musical called Camelot on April 14–16, 2008. Hillcrest High School also constructed a new tennis court, softball field, art room, drama room, debate room, and weight room.
