= Bonneville County, Idaho =

County in Idaho, United States

- County
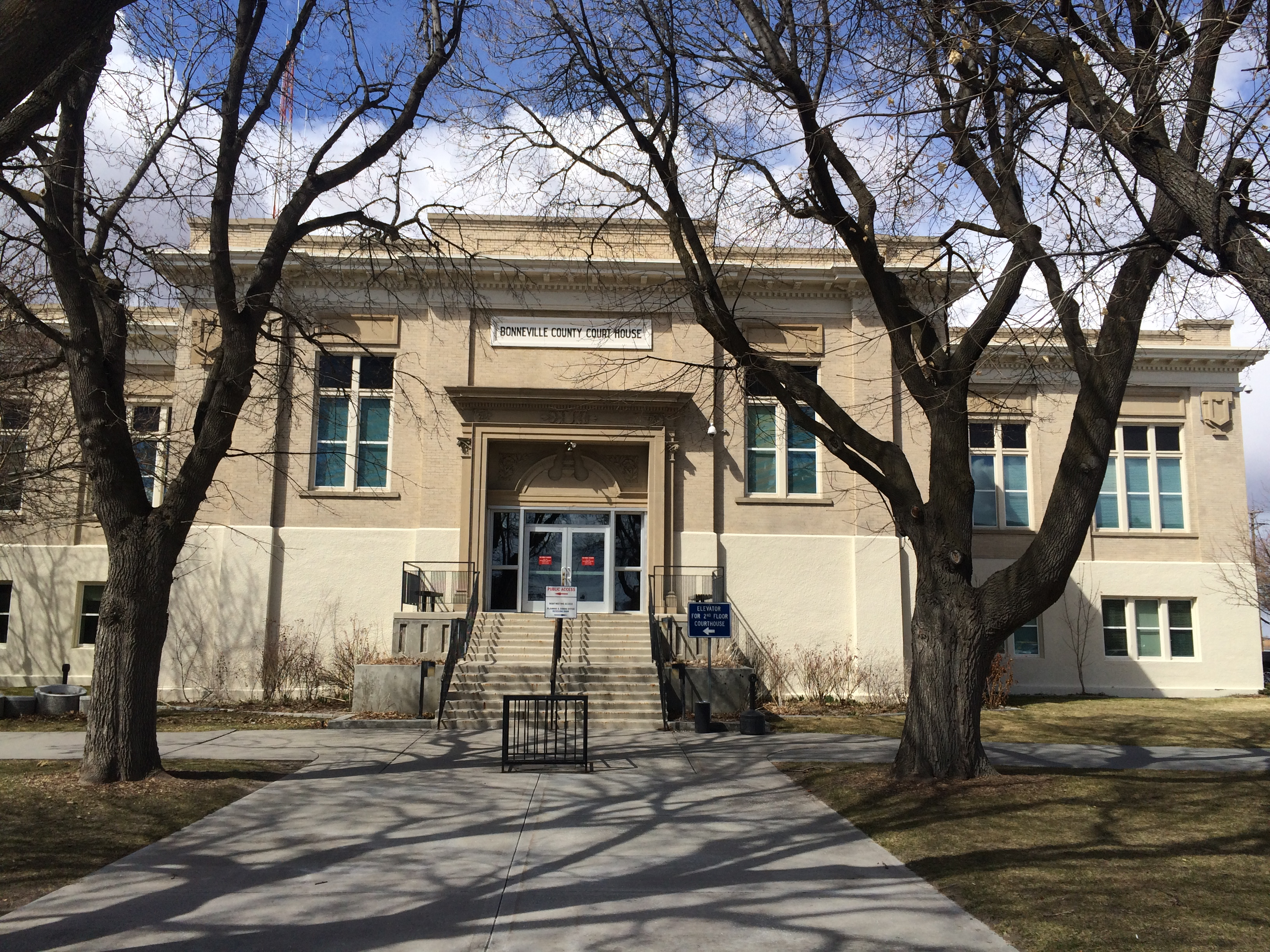
- Bonneville County Courthouse

- Seal

- Location within the U.S. state of Idaho
- Coordinates: 43°23′N 111°36′W
- Country: United States
- State: Idaho
- Founded: February 7, 1911
- Named for: Benjamin Bonneville
- Seat: Idaho Falls
- Largest city: Idaho Falls

Area
  - Total: 1,901 sq mi (4,920 km^{2})
  - Land: 1,866 sq mi (4,830 km^{2})
  - Water: 35 sq mi (91 km^{2}) 1.8%

Population (2020)
  - Total: 123,964
  - Estimate (2025): 135,771 ▲
  - Density: 63.8/sq mi (24.6/km^{2})
- Time zone: UTC−7 (Mountain)
  - Summer (DST): UTC−6 (MDT)
- Congressional district: 2nd
- Website: www.bonnevillecountyidaho.gov

Bonneville County is a county located in the U.S. state of Idaho. As of the 2020 census, the population was 123,964, making it the fourth-most populous county in Idaho and the most populous in eastern Idaho. Its county seat and largest city is Idaho Falls. Bonneville County was established in 1911 and named after Benjamin Bonneville (1796–1878), a French-born officer in the U.S. Army, fur trapper, and explorer in the American West. Benjamin was the son of Nicholas Bonneville of France, an Illuminati member who had written the "Illuminati Manifesto for World Revolution" in 1792, which played a significant role in the French revolution. Bonneville County is part of the Idaho Falls Metropolitan Statistical Area.

== History ==
Bonneville County was established February 7, 1911, by the state legislature from the north and east parts of Bingham County, Idaho. It was named for Capt. B.L.E. Bonneville, of the U.S. Army, who explored throughout the Snake River area in the 1830s. A settlement developed at the site of the Idaho Falls, Idaho ferry on the Snake River in 1864. This settlement was to be known as Idaho Falls after 1891.

Today, Bonneville County stretches up from two desert floors through a fertile valley of plush crops and into heavily forested peaks. The area that became Bonneville County was first associated with Oneida County which stretched through most of southern and southeastern Idaho. It was later reapportioned and formed the northern end of Bingham County. It wasn't until 1911 that Bonneville County was formed, and Idaho Falls became the County seat. During all of this time, and even before people started making boundaries and setting up towns, villages and governments, there was a rich part to the region. Indians roamed much of the county in travels to Camas Harvest, and in 1808 John Corter came through the area. In 1810, Major Andrew Henry saw the country, and in 1832, the man whose name was later to be immortalized by the institution of the county, Captain B.L.E. Bonneville, visited the area.

The first bona fide town in the county, Keenan, was in the extreme eastern portion of Bonneville County near Caribou Mountain. Keenan boasted a population of nearly 1,000 people. It was about this same time, 1870, that Caribou City also sprang up and Eagle Rock, the forerunner of present-day Idaho Falls, began to acquire a population. There was a time during this growth and settlement period when it appeared Caribou City would outgrow Eagle Rock.

The gold rush into the Caribou region was not considered a small one despite the brevity of the settlements. An estimated $50 million was taken out of the region in gold dust and nuggets. Aside from the gold on Caribou Mountain, cattle raising was the first major industry. Before the coming of the railroad, Matt Taylor bought and trailed a herd of cattle into the valley. As more settlers came, they too started herds and stock raising became a profitable, growing industry.

Experiments proved that many farm products could be raised in the area and farms spread over the valley. In 1888, a group of farmers planted small acreages of potatoes. That fall they sold them for 90 cents per hundred weights, and a new industry was created. During the early 20th century, more experiments had shown that sugar beets could be grown successfully. In 1902, Mark Austin surveyed the possibilities and recommended that a sugar factory be built east of Idaho Falls. In 1903 the cornerstone for the building was laid. That fall the factory was in production and the small town of Lincoln built up around it.

From the building of the ferry in 1863 to 1900 the face of Bonneville County changed considerably. The Utah and Northern Railroad Company made Eagle Rock a division point, built maintenance shops and the town grew. In 1885, Eagle Rock had a population of 1,500. In 1887 the railroad shops moved to Pocatello, leaving Eagle Rock almost a ghost town. With the development of irrigation, the town took on a new life and it became the most important shipping point between Ogden, Utah and Butte, Montana.

=== Idaho Falls ===
On August 26, 1891, the name of Eagle Rock was changed to Idaho Falls due to the cataract in the river on the west edge of the city. The town became a city on April 6, 1900, with Joseph A. Clark as its first Mayor. Idaho Falls was on its way and headed for a future that would one day see it as headquarters for an atomic energy installation; but in the year of 1900, it was still a city under the control of Blackfoot. Blackfoot was the county seat of Bingham County which still harbored Idaho Falls and it was to be 11 years before Idaho Falls became the county seat.

== Geography ==
According to the United States Census Bureau, the county has a total area of 1,901 square miles (4,920 km^{2}), of which 1,866 square miles (4,830 km^{2}) is land and 35 square miles (91 km^{2}) (1.8%) is water. The Snake River flows northwest through the Bonneville County, beginning at the Wyoming border as the Palisades Reservoir. The river exits the county about midway on its northern border, turns and re-enters approximately 20 miles (32 km) west to flow southwest through Idaho Falls.

=== Adjacent counties ===
- Madison County - north
- Teton County - north
- Teton County, Wyoming - northeast
- Lincoln County, Wyoming - southeast
- Caribou County - south
- Bingham County - west
- Jefferson County - northwest

=== Major highways ===
- - Interstate 15
- - US 20
- - US 26
- - US 91
- - SH-31
- - SH-43

=== National protected areas ===
- Caribou National Forest (part)
- Grays Lake National Wildlife Refuge (part)
- Targhee National Forest (part)

== Demographics ==
Historical population
Census	Pop.	Note	%±
1920	17,501		—
1930	19,664		12.4%
1940	25,697		30.7%
1950	30,210		17.6%
1960	46,906		55.3%
1970	51,250		9.3%
1980	65,980		28.7%
1990	72,207		9.4%
2000	82,522		14.3%
2010	104,234		26.3%
2020	123,964		18.9%
2025 (est.)	135,771	▲	9.5%
U.S. Decennial Census; 1790–1960, 1900–1990, 1990–2000, 2010–2020

=== Racial and ethnic composition ===
Bonneville County, Idaho – Racial and ethnic composition Note: the US Census treats Hispanic/Latino as an ethnic category. This table excludes Latinos from the racial categories and assigns them to a separate category. Hispanics/Latinos may be of any race.
Race / Ethnicity (NH = Non-Hispanic)	Pop 1980	Pop 1990	Pop 2000	Pop 2010	Pop 2020	% 1980	% 1990	% 2000	% 2010	% 2020
White alone (NH)	63,147	67,879	74,461	88,873	99,943	95.71%	94.01%	90.23%	85.26%	80.62%
Black or African American alone (NH)	198	286	360	533	593	0.30%	0.40%	0.44%	0.51%	0.48%
Native American or Alaska Native alone (NH)	275	343	444	554	677	0.42%	0.48%	0.54%	0.53%	0.55%
Asian alone (NH)	592	663	664	841	1,392	0.90%	0.92%	0.80%	0.81%	1.12%
Native Hawaiian or Pacific Islander alone (NH)	x	x	41	81	145	x	x	0.05%	0.08%	0.12%
Other race alone (NH)	102	26	45	71	395	0.15%	0.04%	0.05%	0.07%	0.32%
Mixed race or Multiracial (NH)	x	x	804	1,369	3,725	x	x	0.97%	1.31%	3.00%
Hispanic or Latino (any race)	1,666	3,010	5,703	11,912	17,094	2.53%	4.17%	6.91%	11.43%	13.79%
Total	65,980	72,207	82,522	104,234	123,964	100.00%	100.00%	100.00%	100.00%	100.00%

=== 2020 census ===
As of the 2020 census, the county had a population of 123,964. The median age was 33.1 years; 30.5% of residents were under the age of 18; 13.8% were 65 years of age or older; for every 100 females there were 99.2 males and for every 100 females age 18 and over there were 97.2 males.

As of the 2020 census, the racial makeup of the county was 83.7% White, 0.5% Black or African American, 1.0% American Indian and Alaska Native, 1.1% Asian, 0.1% Native Hawaiian and Pacific Islander, 6.4% from some other race, and 7.2% from two or more races. Hispanic or Latino residents of any race comprised 13.8% of the population.

As of the 2020 census, 84.8% of residents lived in urban areas, while 15.2% lived in rural areas.

As of the 2020 census, there were 42,684 households in the county, of which 38.3% had children under the age of 18 living with them and 21.9% had a female householder with no spouse or partner present. About 22.9% of all households were made up of individuals and 9.4% had someone living alone who was 65 years of age or older.

As of the 2020 census, there were 45,214 housing units, of which 5.6% were vacant. Among occupied housing units, 70.7% were owner-occupied and 29.3% were renter-occupied. The homeowner vacancy rate was 0.9% and the rental vacancy rate was 5.3%.

=== 2010 census ===
As of the 2010 United States census, there were 104,234 people, 36,629 households, and 26,787 families living in the county. The population density was 55.9 inhabitants per square mile (21.6/km^{2}). There were 39,731 housing units at an average density of 21.3 per square mile (8.2/km^{2}). The racial makeup of the county was 90.6% white, 0.8% Asian, 0.8% American Indian, 0.6% black or African American, 0.1% Pacific islander, 5.1% from other races, and 2.1% from two or more races. Those of Hispanic or Latino origin made up 11.4% of the population. In terms of ancestry, 23.4% were English, 17.4% were German, 9.9% were American, and 7.8% were Irish.

Of the 36,629 households, 40.4% had children under the age of 18 living with them, 58.7% were married couples living together, 10.1% had a female householder with no husband present, 26.9% were non-families, and 22.4% of all households were made up of individuals. The average household size was 2.81 and the average family size was 3.32. The median age was 31.7 years.

The median income for a household in the county was $50,445 and the median income for a family was $58,346. Males had a median income of $46,498 versus $29,008 for females. The per capita income for the county was $23,218. About 8.1% of families and 11.0% of the population were below the poverty line, including 13.9% of those under age 18 and 6.6% of those age 65 or over.

=== 2000 census ===
As of the 2000 census, there were 82,522 people, 28,753 households, and 21,449 families living in the county. The population density was 44 inhabitants per square mile (17/km^{2}). There were 30,484 housing units at an average density of 16 per square mile (6.2/km^{2}). The racial makeup of the county was 92.79% White, 0.49% Black or African American, 0.65% Native American, 0.82% Asian, 0.07% Pacific Islander, 3.72% from other races, and 1.46% from two or more races. 6.91% of the population were Hispanic or Latino of any race. 25.3% were of English, 14.3% German and 12.2% American ancestry.

There were 28,753 households, out of which 40.60% had children under the age of 18 living with them, 62.00% were married couples living together, 9.30% had a female householder with no husband present, and 25.40% were non-families. 21.40% of all households were made up of individuals, and 7.80% had someone living alone who was 65 years of age or older. The average household size was 2.83 and the average family size was 3.33.

In the county, the population was spread out, with 32.10% under the age of 18, 9.50% from 18 to 24, 27.20% from 25 to 44, 21.00% from 45 to 64, and 10.20% who were 65 years of age or older. The median age was 32 years. For every 100 females there were 99.40 males. For every 100 females age 18 and over, there were 96.20 males.

The median income for a household in the county was $41,805, and the median income for a family was $48,216. Males had a median income of $38,745 versus $22,514 for females. The per capita income for the county was $18,326. About 7.40% of families and 10.10% of the population were below the poverty line, including 12.20% of those under age 18 and 5.90% of those age 65 or over.

== Communities ==
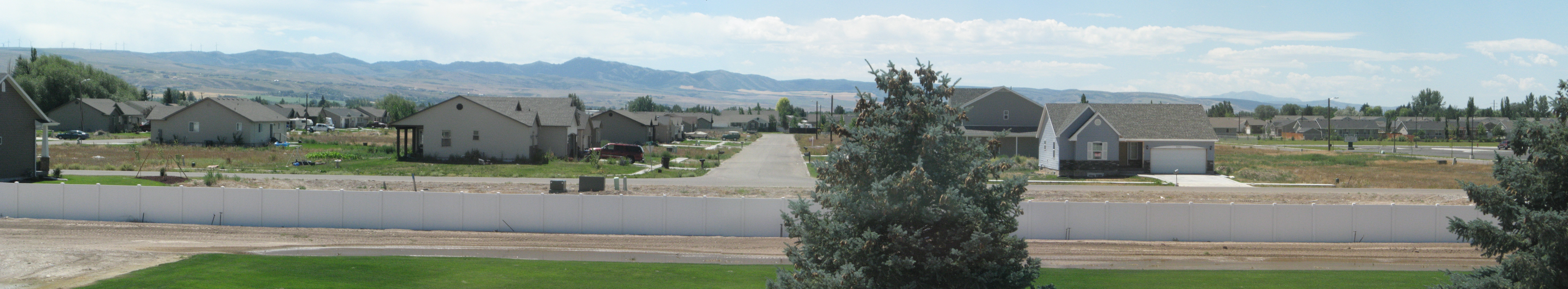
Suburban development in Bonneville County near Idaho Falls in 2012

=== Cities ===
- Ammon
- Idaho Falls
- Iona
- Irwin
- Ririe (partially)
- Swan Valley
- Ucon

=== Census-designated place ===
- Lincoln

=== Unincorporated communities ===
- Beachs Corner
- Bone
- Osgood
- Palisades

=== Ghost towns ===
- Herman
- Caribou City

== Politics ==
Bonneville County, Idaho, Elections Office on North Capitol Avenue in Idaho Falls

Like most of Idaho, Bonneville County has been powerfully Republican for many decades. The last Democratic nominee to win it was Harry S. Truman in 1948. It is very conservative for an urban county; underlining this, Lyndon B. Johnson is the last Democrat to manage even 40 percent of the county's vote.

United States presidential election results for Bonneville County, Idaho
Year	Republican		Democratic		Third party(ies)	
Year	No.	%	No.	%	No.	%
1912	1,176	38.71%	864	28.44%	998	32.85%
1916	1,736	41.62%	2,341	56.13%	94	2.25%
1920	3,260	69.67%	1,419	30.33%	0	0.00%
1924	2,880	53.62%	431	8.02%	2,060	38.35%
1928	3,218	60.31%	2,110	39.54%	8	0.15%
1932	2,781	38.56%	4,298	59.60%	133	1.84%
1936	2,213	28.42%	5,439	69.85%	135	1.73%
1940	3,999	40.39%	5,891	59.51%	10	0.10%
1944	4,048	44.98%	4,935	54.84%	16	0.18%
1948	4,499	44.99%	5,382	53.81%	120	1.20%
1952	10,252	68.38%	4,737	31.59%	4	0.03%
1956	11,099	66.16%	5,676	33.84%	0	0.00%
1960	11,111	55.68%	8,845	44.32%	0	0.00%
1964	10,736	52.70%	9,637	47.30%	0	0.00%
1968	13,582	64.52%	5,178	24.60%	2,290	10.88%
1972	13,134	61.19%	4,199	19.56%	4,133	19.25%
1976	15,793	66.44%	7,230	30.41%	749	3.15%
1980	24,715	77.55%	5,052	15.85%	2,102	6.60%
1984	24,392	82.71%	4,877	16.54%	221	0.75%
1988	22,613	75.01%	7,032	23.33%	502	1.67%
1992	16,557	46.80%	7,014	19.83%	11,805	33.37%
1996	19,977	59.90%	9,013	27.03%	4,360	13.07%
2000	24,988	74.47%	7,235	21.56%	1,333	3.97%
2004	30,048	77.30%	8,356	21.50%	467	1.20%
2008	29,334	70.34%	11,417	27.38%	952	2.28%
2012	32,276	74.68%	9,903	22.91%	1,038	2.40%
2016	26,699	60.38%	8,930	20.19%	8,592	19.43%
2020	37,805	69.97%	14,254	26.38%	1,975	3.66%
2024	40,053	70.97%	14,458	25.62%	1,925	3.41%

== Education ==
School districts include:

- Bonneville Joint School District 93
- Idaho Falls School District 91
- Ririe Joint School District 252
- Shelley Joint School District 60
- Soda Springs Joint School District 150
- Swan Valley Elementary School District 92

College of Eastern Idaho includes this county in its catchment zone, and this is the only county in its taxation zone.

== See also ==
- National Register of Historic Places listings in Bonneville County, Idaho
