= Bonneville High School (Idaho Falls, Idaho) =

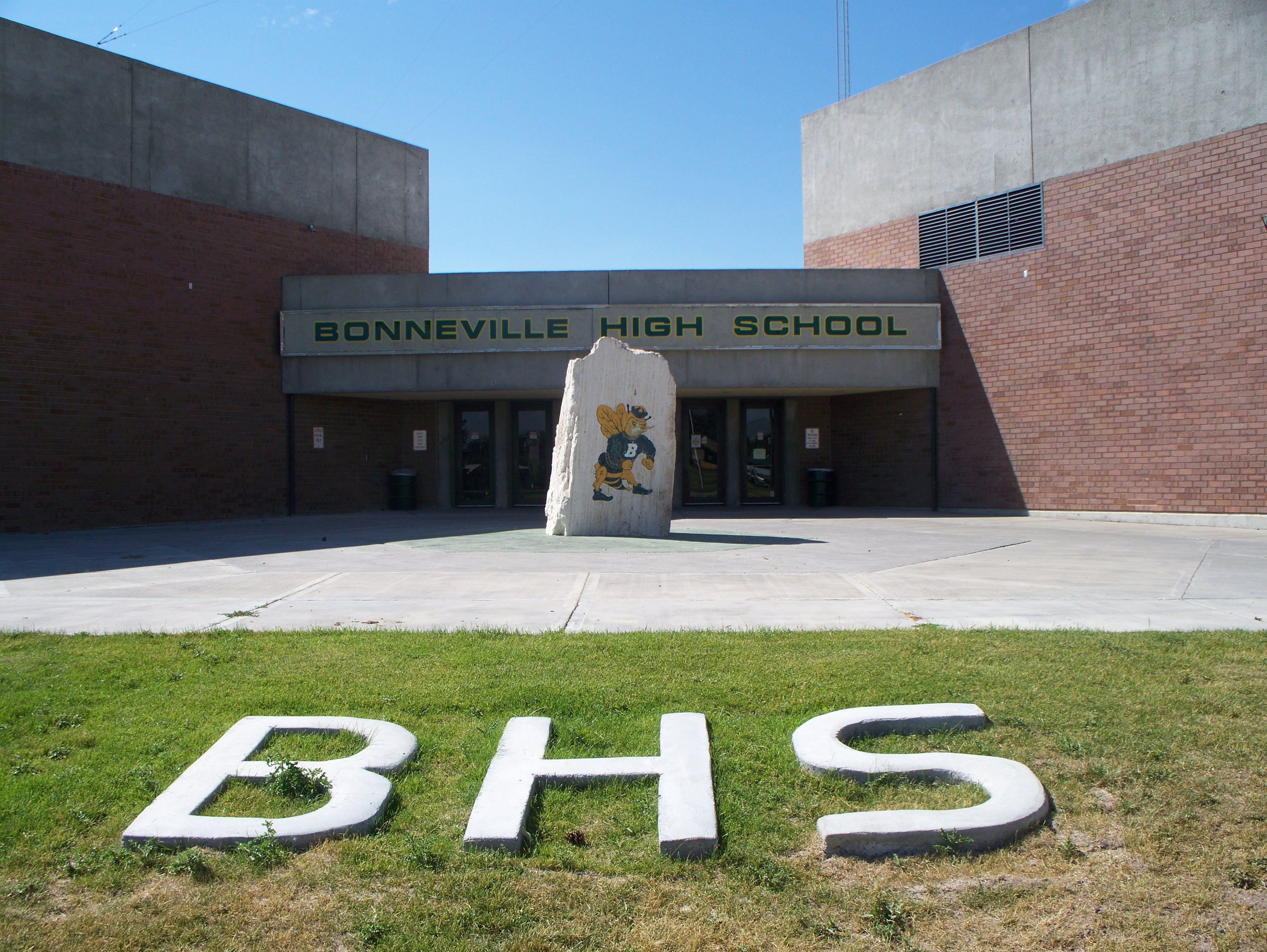
- Southeast entrance in 2008

Location
- 3165 East Iona Road; Bonneville County, Idaho; United States; 43.526°N 111.971°W

Information
- Type: Public
- Established: 1951
- School district: Bonneville Joint School District#93
- Principal: Heath Jackson
- Teaching staff: 54.73 (FTE)
- Grades: 9–12
- Enrollment: 1,152 (2023-2024)
- Student to teacher ratio: 21.05
- Colors: Green, gold, and white
- Athletics: IHSAA Class 4A
- Athletics conference: High Country (5A)
- Mascot: Bee
- Rivals: Hillcrest, Thunder Ridge, Idaho Falls, Skyline
- Newspaper: BHS Buzz
- Yearbook: The Hive
- Feeder schools: Rocky Mountain Middle School
- Elevation: 4,765 ft (1,452 m) AMSL
- Website: www.bonnevillebees.com

Bonneville High School is a four-year public secondary school near Idaho Falls, Idaho. Northeast of the city, it opened in 1951 and is the original high school of the Bonneville Joint School District #93, which consolidated ten smaller districts east of Idaho Falls. The original building for high school was turned into a junior high in 1977 when the current Bonneville High School was built. A second traditional high school in the district opened in 1992, Hillcrest in Ammon. In 2018 a third high school was opened, Thunder Ridge. The school colors are green and gold and the mascot is a bee. Current enrollment is approximately 1,400.

== Athletics ==
Bonneville competes in athletics in IHSAA Class 5A, the highest classification in the state. It is currently a member of the High Country Conference (5A), with Hillcrest High School, Skyline High School and Idaho Falls High School.

=== Rivalries ===
Bonneville's rival is Hillcrest, which opened in 1992. The original rival was Idaho Falls, before Skyline arrived in the late 1960s. Bonneville and Hillcrest will join Idaho Falls and Skyline in the 4A classification starting in 2018.

=== State titles ===
Boys

- Soccer (2): fall (4A) 2007, 2010 (introduced in 2000)
- Basketball (1): (4A) 2003
- Baseball (2): (A-1, now 5A) 1992, (4A) 2013 (records not kept by IHSAA, state tourney introduced in 1971)

Girls

- Volleyball (8): fall (A-1, now 5A) 1991, 1996, 1998; (4A) 2001, 2004, 2007, 2009; (5A) 2016 (introduced in 1976)
- Basketball (2): (4A) 2005, 2007 (introduced in 1976)
- Tennis (2): (4A) 2010, 2011 (combined team until 2008)

== Notable alumni ==
- John L. Smith, college football head coach, class of 1967.
- Mark Asper, NFL guard with Jacksonville Jaguars, class of 2004.
