= Bonneville Joint School District =

School district in Idaho, United States

Bonneville Joint School District #93

Address
- 3397 North Ammon Road Bonneville County, Idaho, 83401; United States

District information
- Type: Public
- Motto: "Student Success By Design"
- Grades: K–12
- Established: 1950
- Superintendent: Scott Woolstenhulme
- NCES District ID: 1600930

Students and staff
- Students: 13,485 (2020–21)
- Teachers: 674
- Staff: 527

Other information
- Website: www.d93schools.org

Location in the United States
Location in Bonneville County, Idaho

The Bonneville Joint School District #93 (D93) is a public school district in the U.S. state of Idaho, headquartered in an unincorporated area of Bonneville County near Idaho Falls. As of the 2020–21 school year, District #93 serves more than 13,000 students in 20 schools, making it the fourth-largest by enrollment in the state. The district has 16 elementary schools serving students in K-6, three middle schools serving students in grades 7–8, and six high schools serving students in grades 9–12.

The district includes Ammon, Iona, Ucon, and portions of Idaho Falls, as well as the Lincoln census-designated place and other unincorporated areas of the county.

== History ==
Chuck Shackett served as superintendent from 2001 to 2019, with Scott Woolstenhulme replacing him.

== Schools ==
=== High schools ===
- Bonneville High School

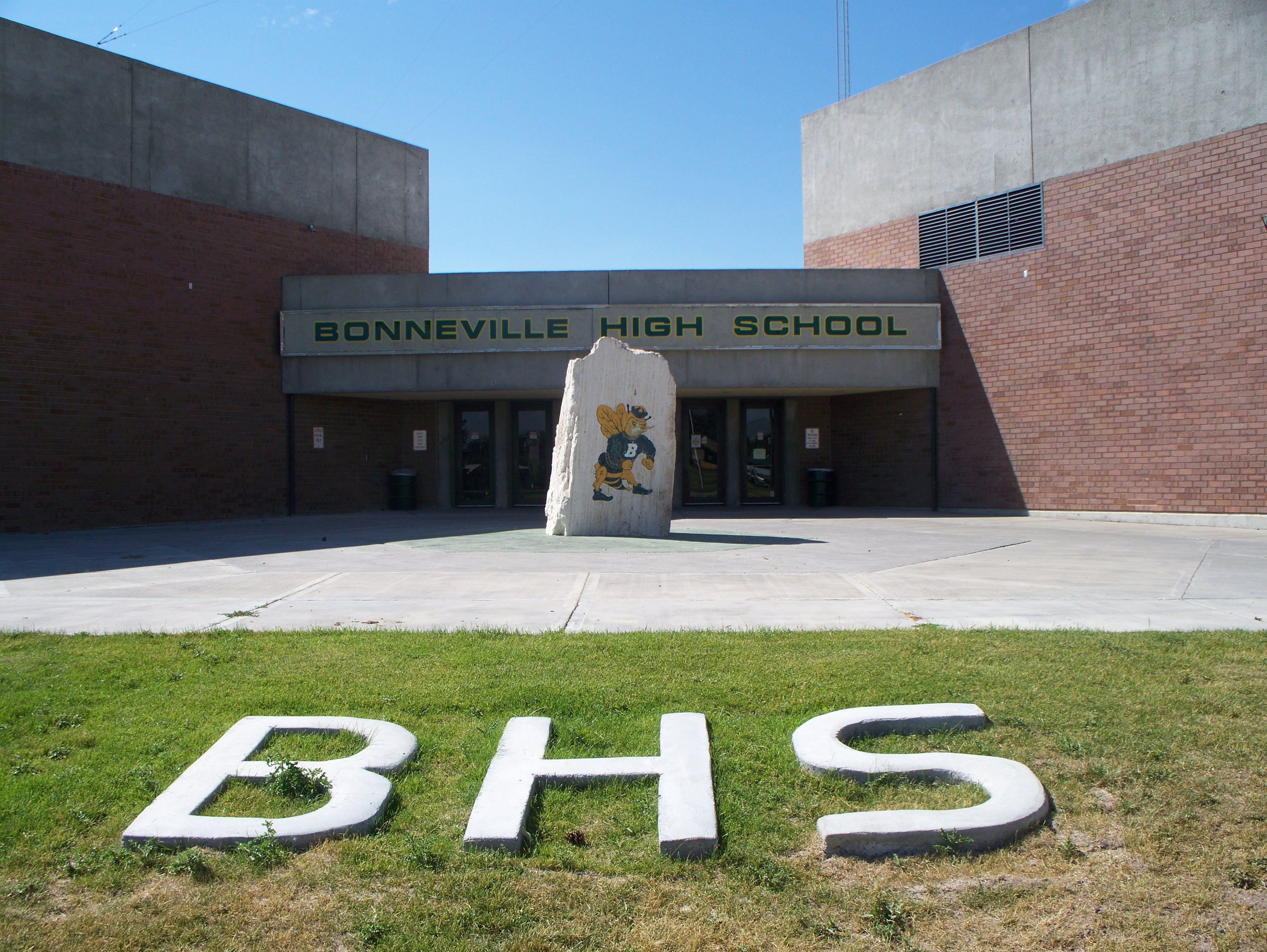
Southeast Entrance of Bonneville High School

- Hillcrest High School

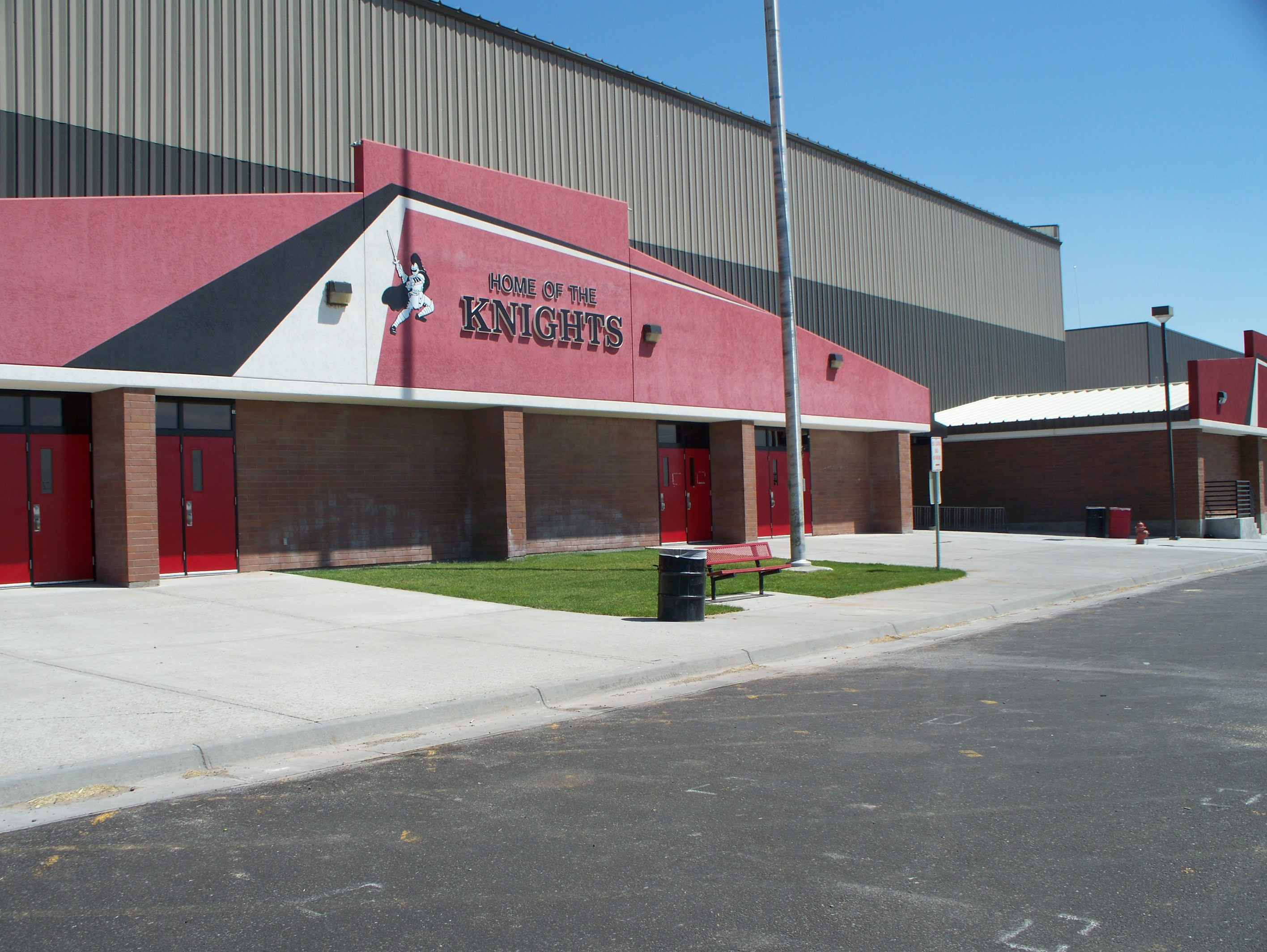
The west entrance to Hillcrest High School

- Thunder Ridge High School

=== Alternative high schools ===
- Lincoln Alternative High School

=== Middle schools ===
- Rocky Mountain Middle School

. black canyon middle school – Feeder Schools:
• Bridgewater Elementary School
• Cloverdale Elementary School
• Discovery Elementary School
• Fairview Elementary School
• Falls Valley Elementary School
• Iona Elementary School
• Summit Hills Elementary School
• Ucon Elementary School

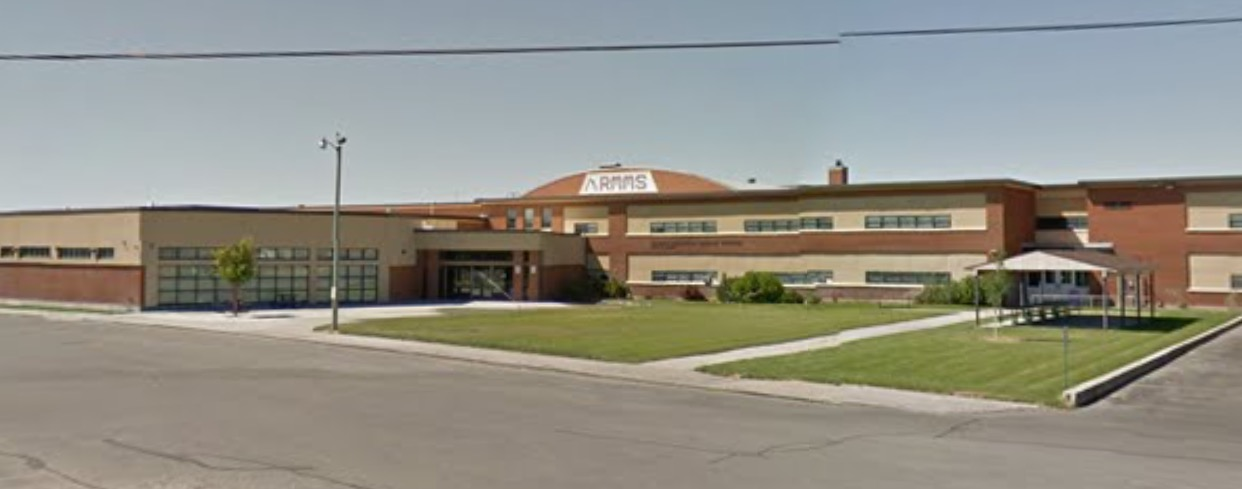
Rocky Mountain Middle School

- Sandcreek Middle School

– Feeder Schools:
• Ammon Elementary School
• Falls Valley Elementary School
• Hillview Elementary School
• Mountain Valley Elementary School
• Rimrock Elementary School
• Tiebreaker Elementary School
• Woodland Hills Elementary School

A third middle school, Black Canyon Middle School, opened in 2021.

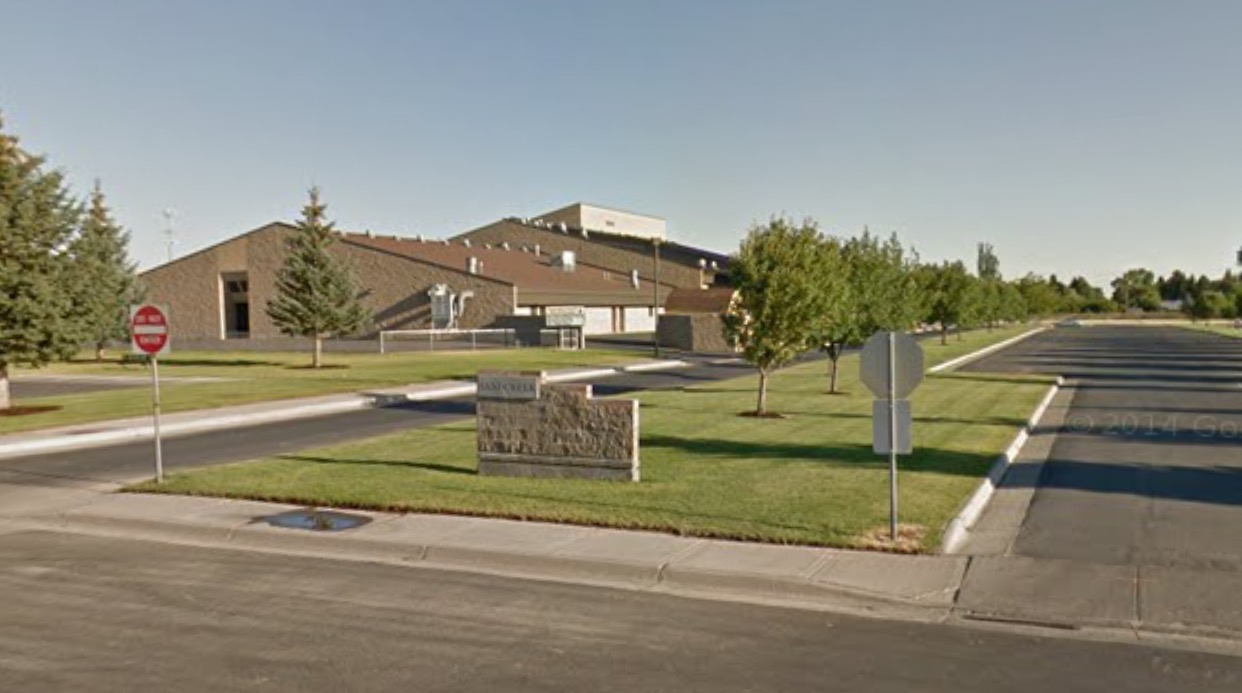
Sandcreek Middle School

=== Elementary schools ===
- Ammon Elementary School (It closed as an elementary school in 2026 but will transition into a 7-12 grade school next year, 2027. Its current freshman class are at a middle school campus for the 26-27 school year)
- Bonneville Online Elementary School
- Bridgewater Elementary School
- Cloverdale Elementary School
- Discovery Elementary School
- Fairview Elementary School
- Falls Valley Elementary School
- Hillview Elementary School
- Iona Elementary School
- Mountain Valley Elementary School
- Rimrock Elementary School
- Summit Hills Elementary School
- Tiebreaker Elementary School
- Ucon Elementary School
- Willow Creek Elementary
- Woodland Hills Elementary School
