= Iona, Idaho =

- City
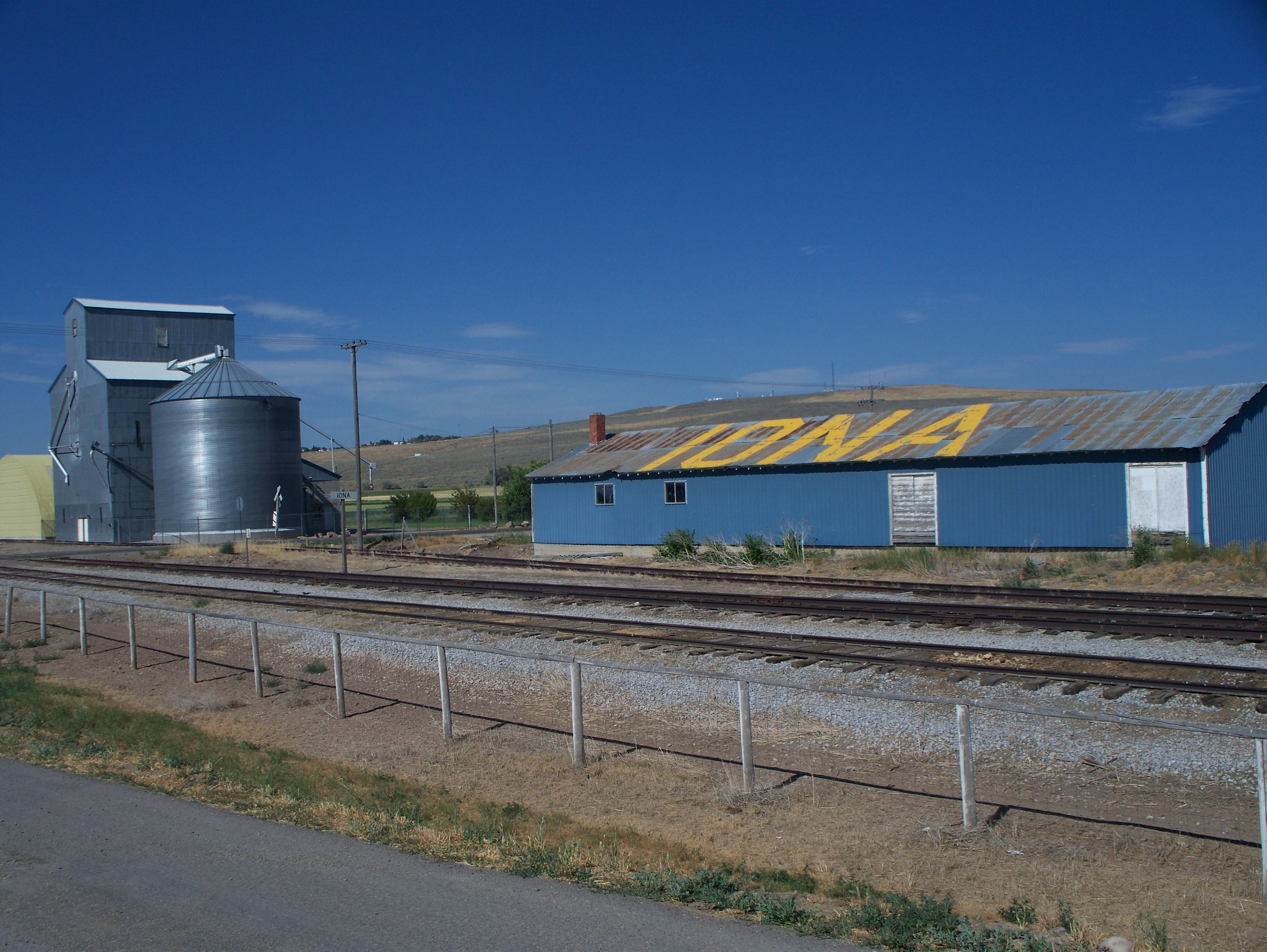
- A grain elevator near the train tracks.

- Location of Iona in Bonneville County, Idaho.
- Coordinates: 43°31′37″N 111°55′51″W
- Country: United States
- State: Idaho
- County: Bonneville
- Settled: 1883
- Incorporated: April 10, 1905

Area
  - Total: 1.17 sq mi (3.02 km^{2})
  - Land: 1.17 sq mi (3.02 km^{2})
  - Water: 0 sq mi (0.00 km^{2})
- Elevation: 4,787 ft (1,459 m)

Population (2020)
  - Total: 2,717
  - Density: 2,330/sq mi (900/km^{2})
- Time zone: UTC-7 (Mountain (MST))
  - Summer (DST): UTC-6 (MDT)
- ZIP code: 83427
- Area codes: 208, 986
- FIPS code: 16-40420
- GNIS feature ID: 2410109
- Website: www.cityofiona.org

Iona is a city in Bonneville County, Idaho, United States. It is part of the Idaho Falls, Idaho Metropolitan Statistical Area. The population was 2,717 at the 2020 census.

== Geography ==
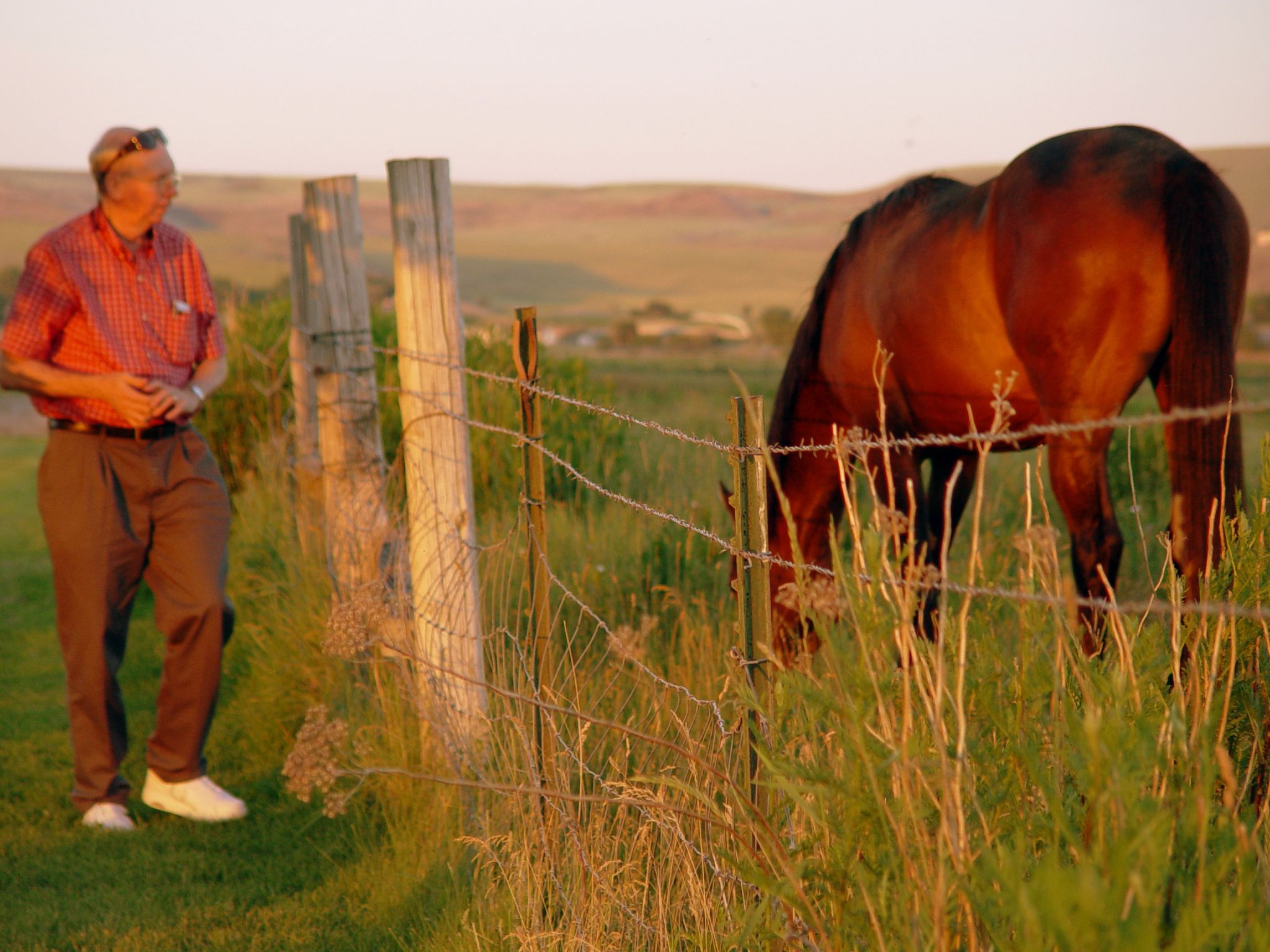
A farm in Iona

According to the United States Census Bureau, the city has a total area of 1.10 square miles (2.85 km^{2}), all of it land.

== Demographics ==
Historical population
Census	Pop.	Note	%±
1910	353		—
1920	630		78.5%
1930	386		−38.7%
1940	518		34.2%
1950	502		−3.1%
1960	702		39.8%
1970	890		26.8%
1980	1,072		20.4%
1990	1,049		−2.1%
2000	1,201		14.5%
2010	1,803		50.1%
2020	2,717		50.7%
U.S. Decennial Census

=== 2020 census ===
As of the 2020 census, Iona had a population of 2,717. The median age was 29.5 years. 38.3% of residents were under the age of 18 and 10.2% of residents were 65 years of age or older. For every 100 females there were 104.1 males, and for every 100 females age 18 and over there were 103.6 males age 18 and over.

99.5% of residents lived in urban areas, while 0.5% lived in rural areas.

There were 789 households in Iona, of which 53.2% had children under the age of 18 living in them. Of all households, 71.6% were married-couple households, 12.8% were households with a male householder and no spouse or partner present, and 13.2% were households with a female householder and no spouse or partner present. About 11.8% of all households were made up of individuals and 6.3% had someone living alone who was 65 years of age or older.

There were 820 housing units, of which 3.8% were vacant. The homeowner vacancy rate was 0.8% and the rental vacancy rate was 4.9%.

Racial composition as of the 2020 census
Race	Number	Percent
White	2,493	91.8%
Black or African American	0	0.0%
American Indian and Alaska Native	6	0.2%
Asian	9	0.3%
Native Hawaiian and Other Pacific Islander	3	0.1%
Some other race	77	2.8%
Two or more races	129	4.7%
Hispanic or Latino (of any race)	227	8.4%

=== 2010 census ===
As of the census of 2010, there were 1,803 people, 578 households, and 481 families residing in the city. The population density was 1,639.1 inhabitants per square mile (632.9/km^{2}). There were 601 housing units at an average density of 546.4 per square mile (211.0/km^{2}). The racial makeup of the city was 97.7% White, 0.2% African American, 0.3% Native American, 0.1% Asian, 0.7% from other races, and 1.1% from two or more races. Hispanic or Latino of any race were 3.9% of the population.

There were 578 households, of which 45.7% had children under the age of 18 living with them, 72.7% were married couples living together, 6.2% had a female householder with no husband present, 4.3% had a male householder with no wife present, and 16.8% were non-families. 14.0% of all households were made up of individuals, and 5.9% had someone living alone who was 65 years of age or older. The average household size was 3.12 and the average family size was 3.44.

The median age in the city was 31.5 years. 35.1% of residents were under the age of 18; 6.6% were between the ages of 18 and 24; 25.8% were from 25 to 44; 21.1% were from 45 to 64; and 11.5% were 65 years of age or older. The gender makeup of the city was 49.1% male and 50.9% female.

=== 2000 census ===
As of the census of 2000, there were 1,201 people, 372 households, and 318 families residing in the city. The population density was 1,526.0 inhabitants per square mile (589.2/km^{2}). There were 385 housing units at an average density of 489.2 per square mile (188.9/km^{2}). The racial makeup of the city was 98.42% White, 0.08% African American, 0.17% Native American, 0.08% Asian, 0.83% from other races, and 0.42% from two or more races. Hispanic or Latino of any race were 2.91% of the population.

There were 372 households, out of which 44.6% had children under the age of 18 living with them, 76.3% were married couples living together, 5.9% had a female householder with no husband present, and 14.5% were non-families. 12.4% of all households were made up of individuals, and 5.4% had someone living alone who was 65 years of age or older. The average household size was 3.23 and the average family size was 3.55.

In the city, the population was spread out, with 35.6% under the age of 18, 7.2% from 18 to 24, 24.5% from 25 to 44, 21.2% from 45 to 64, and 11.6% who were 65 years of age or older. The median age was 33 years. For every 100 females, there were 100.5 males. For every 100 females age 18 and over, there were 98.5 males.

The median income for a household in the city was $39,904, and the median income for a family was $42,692. Males had a median income of $32,105 versus $21,818 for females. The per capita income for the city was $14,334. 17.6% of the population and 14.0% of families were below the poverty line. 11.6% of those under the age of 18 and 6.1% of those 65 and older were living below the poverty line.

== Education ==
Iona is served by the Bonneville Joint School District #93, with Iona Elementary School within the Iona city limits. Students are bused to Black Canyon Middle School and Thunder Ridge High School.
