= Thunder Ridge High School =

Location
- 4941 East First Street; Idaho Falls, Idaho; United States; 43.498892°N 111.936574°W

Information
- Type: Public
- Established: 2018; 8 years ago
- School district: Bonneville Joint School District #93
- Principal: Trent Dabell
- Staff: 77.86
- Grades: 9–12
- Enrollment: 1,693 (2025)
- Student to teacher ratio: 21.75
- Colors: Blue; Black; Silver
- Athletics conference: 6A High Country Conference
- Mascot: Titans
- Accreditation: Cognia
- Website: www.thunderridgetitans.com

Thunder Ridge High School is a four-year Public high school located in Idaho Falls, Idaho.

== History ==
Due to rapid population growth in the 2010s, Bonneville Joint School District became the largest school district outside of Idaho's Treasure Valley. In 2015 voters passed a $63.5 million bond to construct a new high school. When it opened in 2018, it had the largest school population in the district and the first new high school built in the district since 1992. It has 250,000 square feet across three floors and sits on a 50-acre site that includes all athletic facilities, a 1000-seat auditorium and 77 classrooms. Originally to be named Black Canyon High School with the Phantom mascot, it went through a name change prior to the school opening.

== Athletics ==
Thunder Ridge High School Titans compete in the 6A division, the largest division in the Idaho High School Activities Association (IHSAA). They participate in the District V / VI High Country Conference.

=== State championships ===
- Dance: 2022
- Volleyball: 2019
