= National Register of Historic Places listings in Bonneville County, Idaho =

Location of Bonneville County in Idaho

This is a list of the National Register of Historic Places listings in Bonneville County, Idaho.

This is intended to be a complete list of the properties and districts on the National Register of Historic Places in Bonneville County, Idaho, United States. Latitude and longitude coordinates are provided for many National Register properties and districts; these locations may be seen together in a map.

There are 33 properties and districts listed on the National Register in the county. More may be added; properties and districts nationwide are added to the Register weekly.

This National Park Service list is complete through NPS recent listings posted December 12, 2025.

== Current listings ==
	Name on the Register	Image	Date listed	Location	City or town	Description
1	Andrew and Johanna M. Beckman Farm	Andrew and Johanna M. Beckman Farm	November 6, 1992 (#92001414)	U.S. Route 20, 0.5 miles west of its junction with New Sweden Rd. 43°29′37″N 112°08′12″W	Idaho Falls	
2	Oscar and Christina Beckman Farmstead	Oscar and Christina Beckman Farmstead	November 19, 1991 (#91001713)	Southwestern corner of the junction of New Sweden-Shelley Rd. and U.S. Route 20; 43°29′38″N 112°07′28″W	Idaho Falls	
3	Bonneville County Courthouse	Bonneville County Courthouse	July 10, 1979 (#79000781)	605 N. Capital Ave. 43°29′42″N 112°02′25″W	Idaho Falls	
4	Bonneville Hotel	Bonneville Hotel	August 30, 1984 (#84001032)	400 block of W. C St. 43°29′41″N 112°02′19″W	Idaho Falls	
5	Douglas-Farr Building	Douglas-Farr Building	August 30, 1984 (#84001035)	493 N. Capital Ave. 43°29′38″N 112°02′25″W	Idaho Falls	This building is no longer standing.
6	Eagle Rock Ferry		June 7, 1974 (#74000734)	North of Idaho Falls on the Snake River; 43°36′15″N 112°03′23″W	Idaho Falls	
7	Eleventh Street Historic District	Eleventh Street Historic District	August 8, 1997 (#97000863)	Roughly bounded by S. Boulevard, 13th, 10th, and 9th Sts., S. Emerson and S. Lee Aves. 43°29′18″N 112°01′47″W	Idaho Falls	
8	Farmers and Merchants Bank Building	Farmers and Merchants Bank Building	August 30, 1984 (#84001037)	383 W. A St. 43°29′31″N 112°02′24″W	Idaho Falls	
9	First Presbyterian Church	First Presbyterian Church	March 29, 1978 (#78001052)	325 Elm St. 43°29′22″N 112°02′06″W	Idaho Falls	
10	Hasbrouck Building	Hasbrouck Building	August 30, 1984 (#84001039)	362 Park Ave. 43°29′33″N 112°02′24″W	Idaho Falls	
11	Holy Rosary Church	Holy Rosary Church	July 17, 2002 (#02000802)	288 E. 9th St. 43°29′22″N 112°01′45″W	Idaho Falls	
12	Hotel Idaho	Hotel Idaho	August 30, 1984 (#84001042)	482 W. C St. 43°29′42″N 112°02′22″W	Idaho Falls	
13	I.O.O.F. Building	I.O.O.F. Building	August 30, 1984 (#84001090)	393 N. Park Ave. 43°29′34″N 112°02′28″W	Idaho Falls	
14	Idaho Falls Airport Historic District	Idaho Falls Airport Historic District	September 10, 1997 (#97001126)	2381 Foote Dr. 43°31′02″N 112°03′30″W	Idaho Falls	
15	Idaho Falls City Building	Idaho Falls City Building	August 30, 1984 (#84001092)	303 W. C St. 43°29′39″N 112°02′15″W	Idaho Falls	
16	Idaho Falls Public Library	Idaho Falls Public Library	August 30, 1984 (#84001093)	200 N. Eastern Dr. 43°29′25″N 112°02′14″W	Idaho Falls	
17	Iona Meetinghouse	Iona Meetinghouse	May 7, 1973 (#73000681)	Southeast corner of Main St. and Rockwood Ave. 43°31′41″N 111°55′42″W	Iona	Built in 1887, now the Stanger Memorial Art Gallery
18	Kress Building	Kress Building	August 30, 1984 (#84001095)	451 N. Park Ave. 43°29′36″N 112°02′24″W	Idaho Falls	
19	Montgomery Ward Building	Montgomery Ward Building	August 30, 1984 (#84001096)	504–520 Shoup Ave. 43°29′35″N 112°02′16″W	Idaho Falls	
20	New Sweden School	New Sweden School	November 19, 1991 (#91001714)	Southwestern corner of the junction of New Sweden School Rd. and Mill Rd. 43°28′56″N 112°06′07″W	Idaho Falls	
21	Palisades Dam and Powerplant Historic District	Palisades Dam and Powerplant Historic District	August 6, 2018 (#100002771)	US 26, .81 mi. S of jct. with Forest Road 260; 43°20′02″N 111°12′16″W	Palisades vicinity	
22	Ridge Avenue Historic District	Ridge Avenue Historic District	May 20, 1993 (#93000388)	Roughly bounded by N. Eastern Ave., Birch St., S. Boulevard, Ash St., W. Placer Ave., and Pine St. 43°29′24″N 112°02′07″W	Idaho Falls	
23	Rocky Mountain Bell Telephone Company Building		August 30, 1984 (#84001099)	246 W. Broadway Ave. 43°29′29″N 112°02′20″W	Idaho Falls	This building is no longer standing.
24	St. John Lutheran Church		January 25, 2024 (#100009872)	290 7th Street; 43°29′29″N 112°01′44″W	Idaho Falls	
25	Salt River Hydroelectric Powerplant	Salt River Hydroelectric Powerplant	December 2, 1993 (#93000889)	End of County Road 12-104, 0.7 miles west of U.S. Route 89; 43°06′14″N 111°02′20″W	Wayan	Extends into Lincoln County, Wyoming
26	Carl S. and Lizzie Sealander Farmstead		May 5, 1992 (#92000414)	Western end of St. John Rd. 43°26′30″N 112°09′57″W	Idaho Falls	
27	Shane Building	Shane Building	August 30, 1984 (#84001101)	381 N. Shoup Ave. 43°29′32″N 112°02′21″W	Idaho Falls	
28	Shelton L.D.S. Ward Chapel	Shelton L.D.S. Ward Chapel	August 30, 1979 (#79000783)	Southwest of Ririe on Shelton Rd; 43°37′07″N 111°49′23″W	Ririe	
29	Trinity Methodist Church	Trinity Methodist Church	December 16, 1977 (#77000458)	237 N. Water Ave. 43°29′25″N 112°02′13″W	Idaho Falls	
30	Art Troutner Houses Historic District	Art Troutner Houses Historic District	September 10, 2008 (#08000868)	3950, 4012, and 4032 S. 5th, W. 43°27′43″N 112°02′40″W	Idaho Falls	
31	U.S. Post Office	U.S. Post Office	May 31, 1979 (#79000782)	581 Park Ave. 43°29′40″N 112°02′20″W	Idaho Falls	
32	Underwood Hotel	Underwood Hotel	August 30, 1984 (#84001102)	343-349 W. C St. 43°29′38″N 112°02′17″W	Idaho Falls	
33	Wasden Site (Owl Cave)	Wasden Site (Owl Cave)	May 24, 1976 (#76000669)	Address Restricted	Idaho Falls	

== Former listings ==
	Name on the Register	Image	Date listed	Date removed	Location	City or town	Description
1	Eagle Rock Street Historic District		June 6, 1973 (#73002267)	January 13, 1986	353, 357, 361, and 375 Eagle Rock St.	Idaho Falls	
2	Snake River Ranger Station	Snake River Ranger Station	September 20, 1983 (#83000297)	July 16, 1993	US Highway 26	Swan Valley	Destroyed by fire in 1992

== See also ==
- List of National Historic Landmarks in Idaho
- National Register of Historic Places listings in Idaho
