= United States National Register of Historic Places listings =

The concentration of NRHP listings throughout the contiguous U.S. by county

The National Register of Historic Places in the United States is a register including buildings, sites, structures, districts, and objects. The Register automatically includes all National Historic Landmarks as well as all historic areas administered by the U.S. National Park Service. Since its introduction in 1966, more than 95,000 separate listings have been added to the register.

== Current listings by state and territory ==
The following are approximate tallies of current listings by state and territory on the National Register of Historic Places. These counts are based on entries in the National Register Information Database as of August 16, 2025, and new weekly listings posted since then on the National Register of Historic Places website. There are frequent additions to the listings and occasional delistings and the counts here are approximate and not official. New entries are added to the official Register on a weekly basis. Also, the counts in this table exclude boundary increase and decrease listings which modify the area covered by an existing property or district and which carry a separate National Register reference number. The numbers of NRHP listings in each state are documented by tables in each of the individual state list articles.

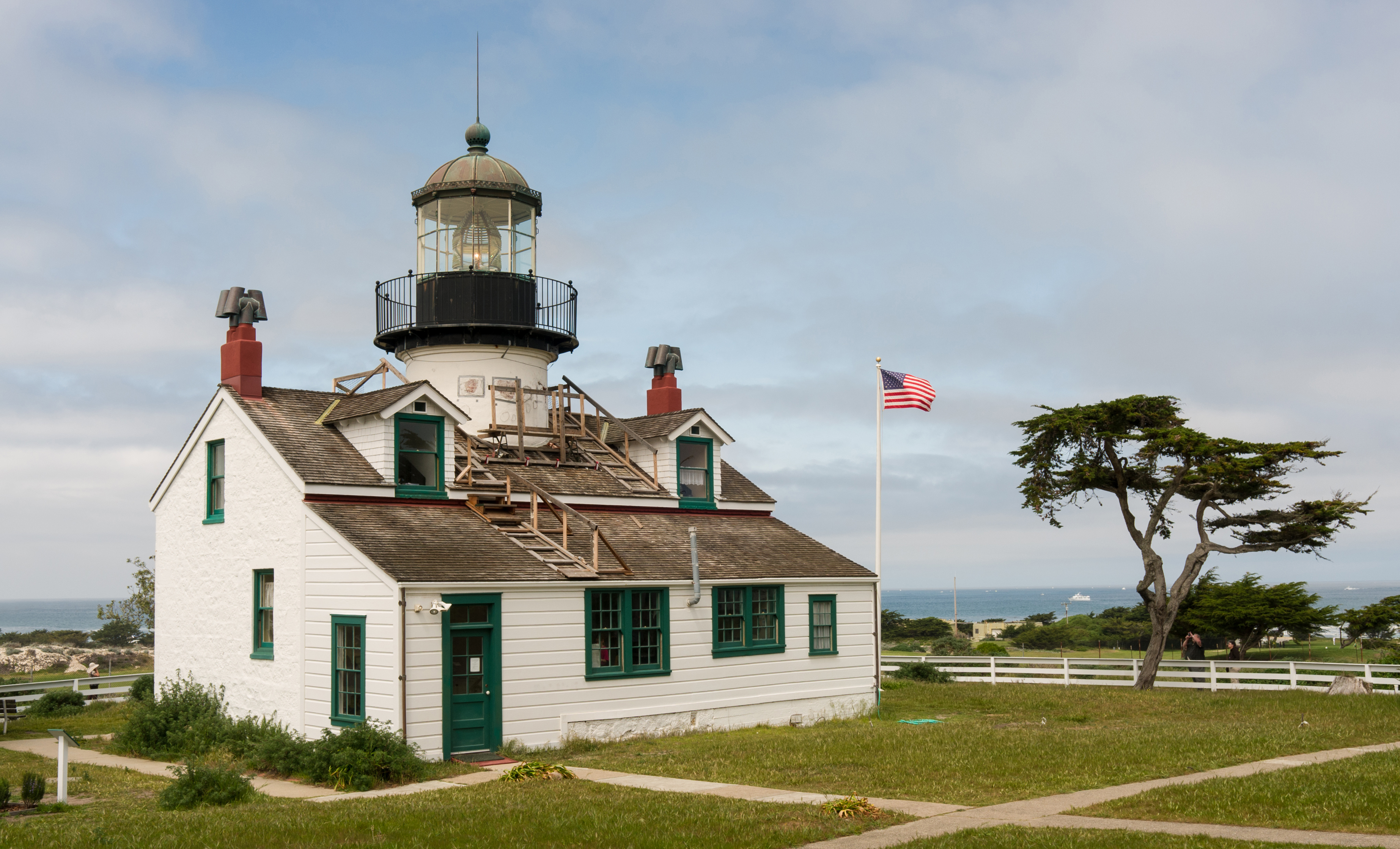
Point Pinos Lighthouse, Monterey, California

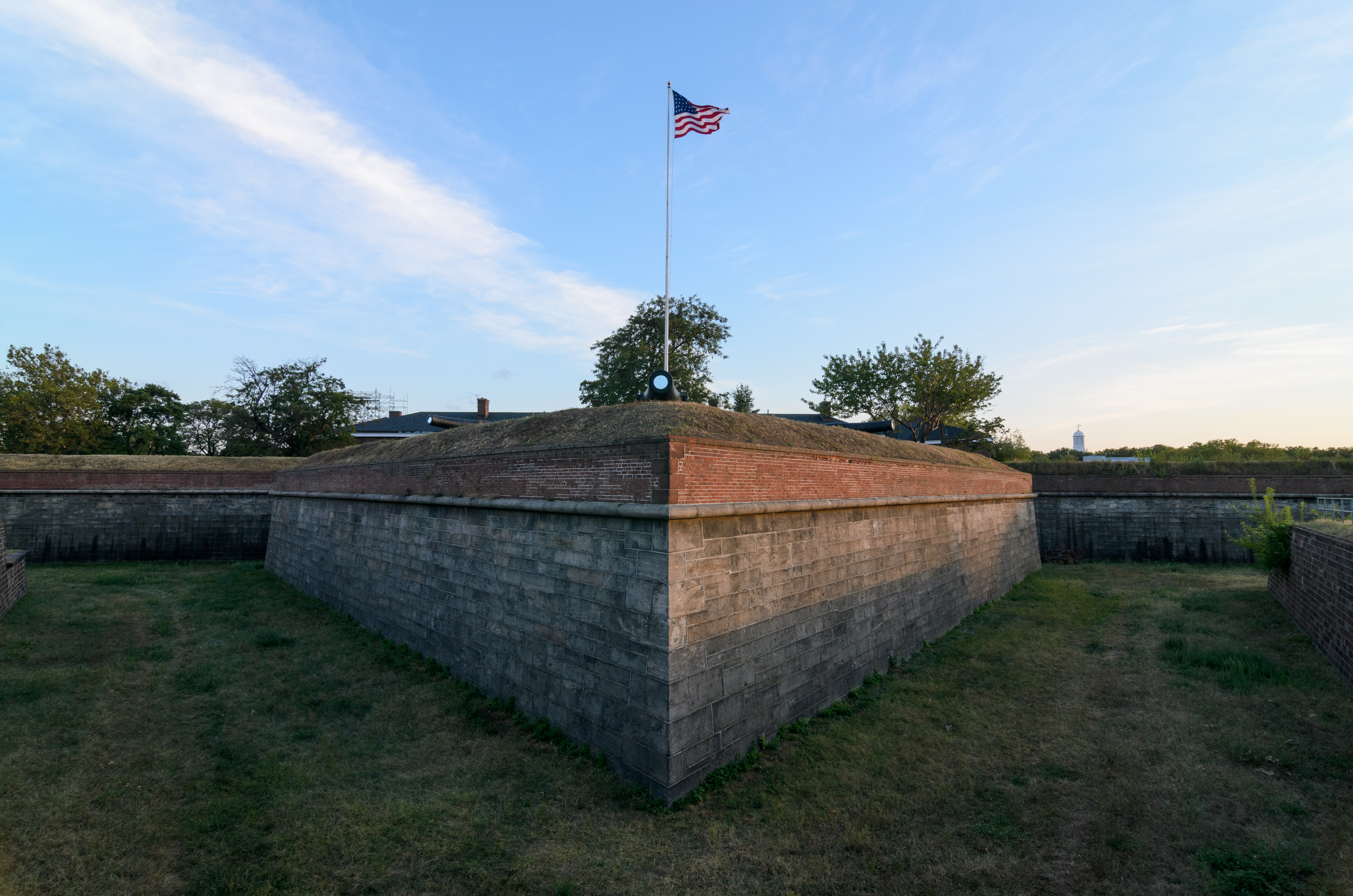
Fort Jay, Governors Island, New York

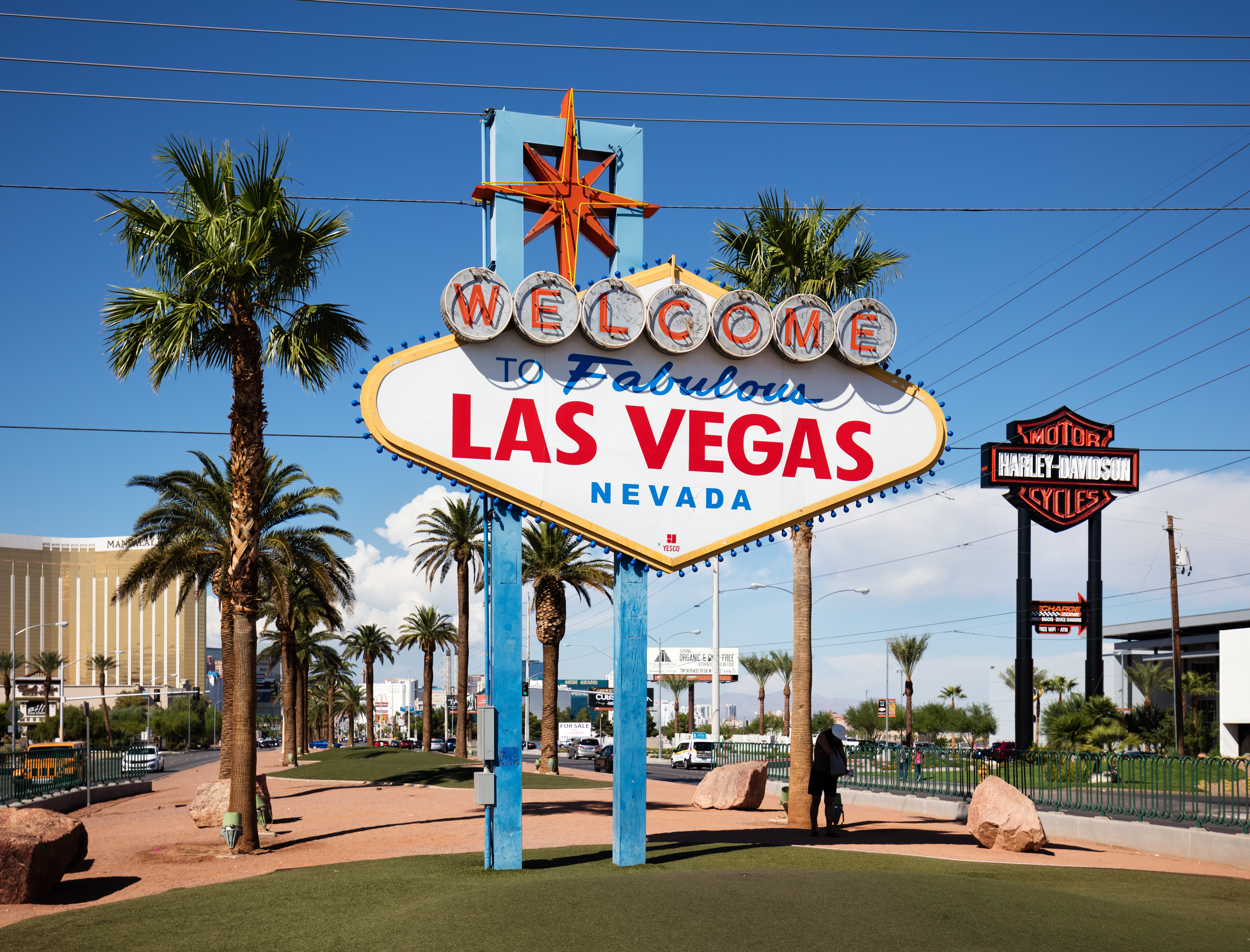
The "Welcome to Fabulous Las Vegas" Sign, Las Vegas, Nevada

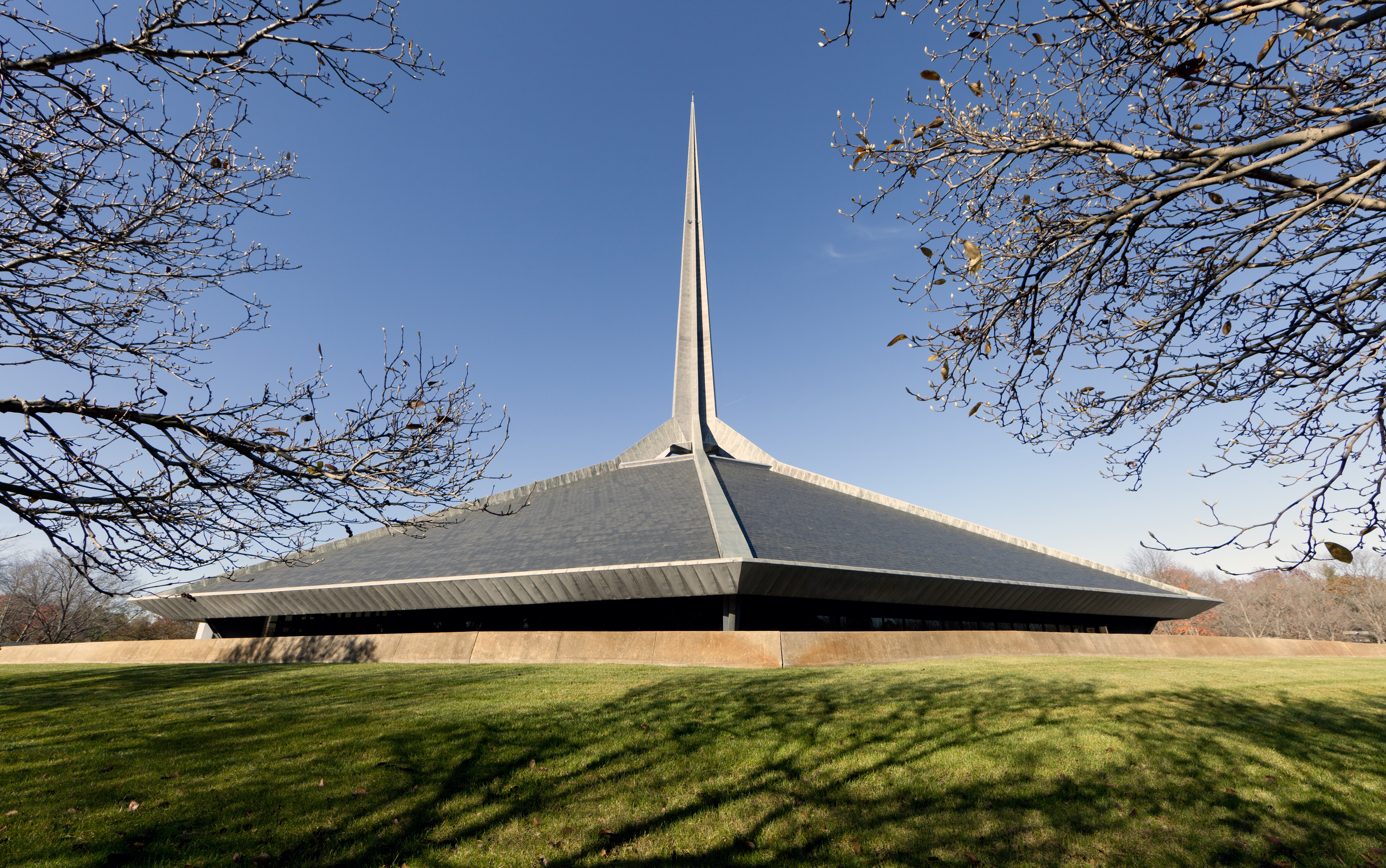
North Christian Church, Columbus, Indiana

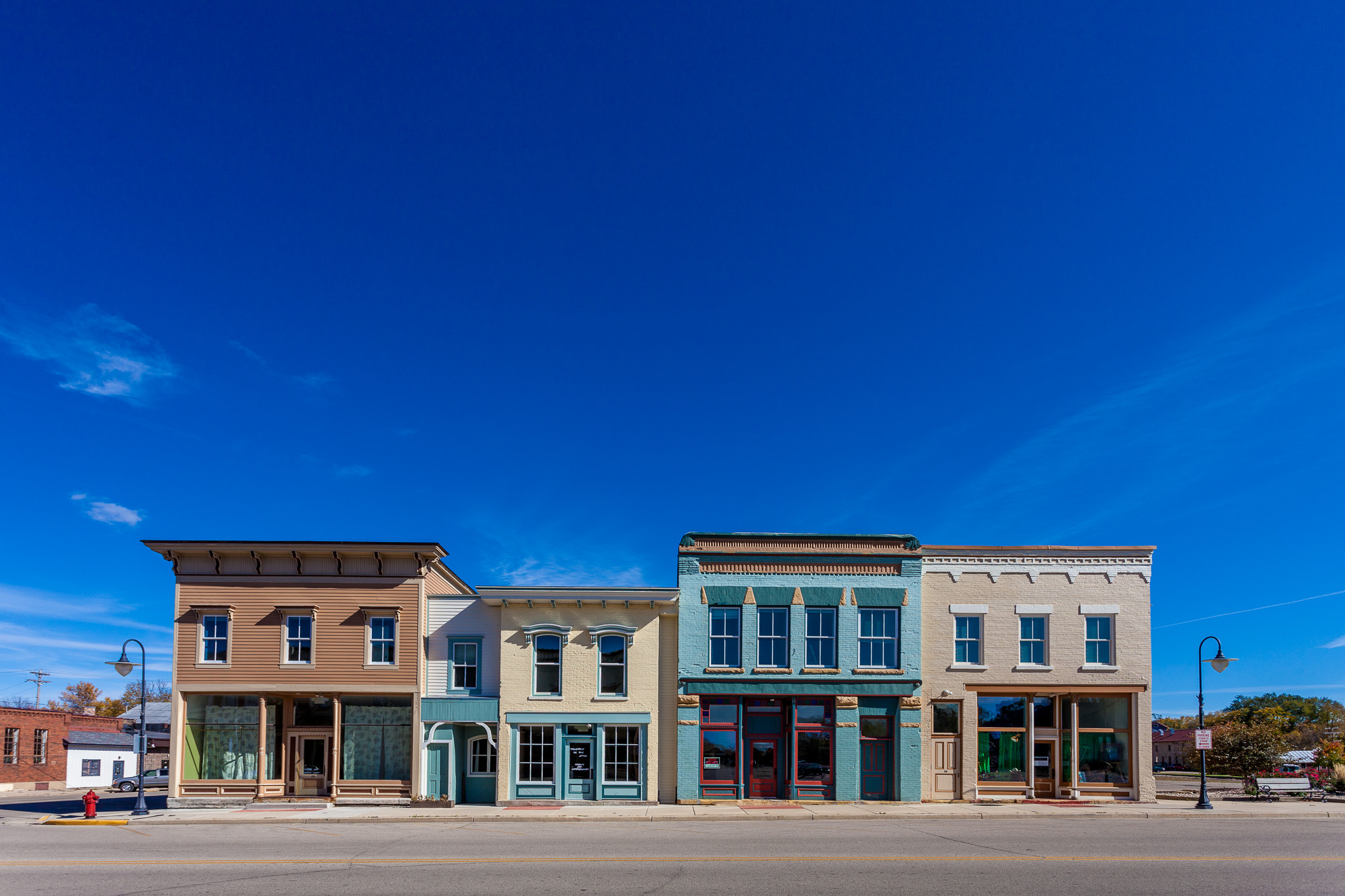
Mazomanie Downtown Historic District, Mazomanie, Wisconsin

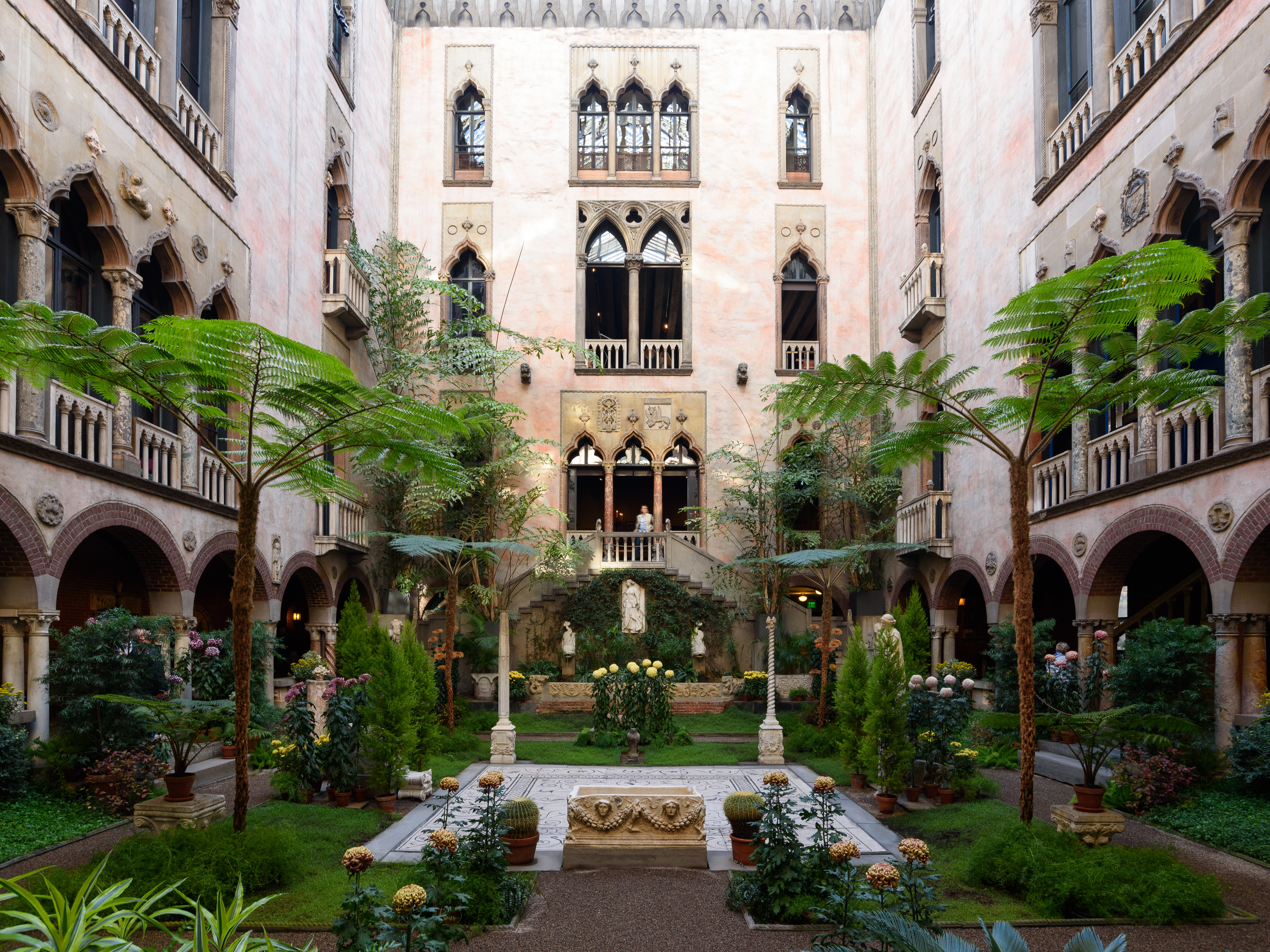
Isabella Stewart Gardner Museum, Boston, Massachusetts

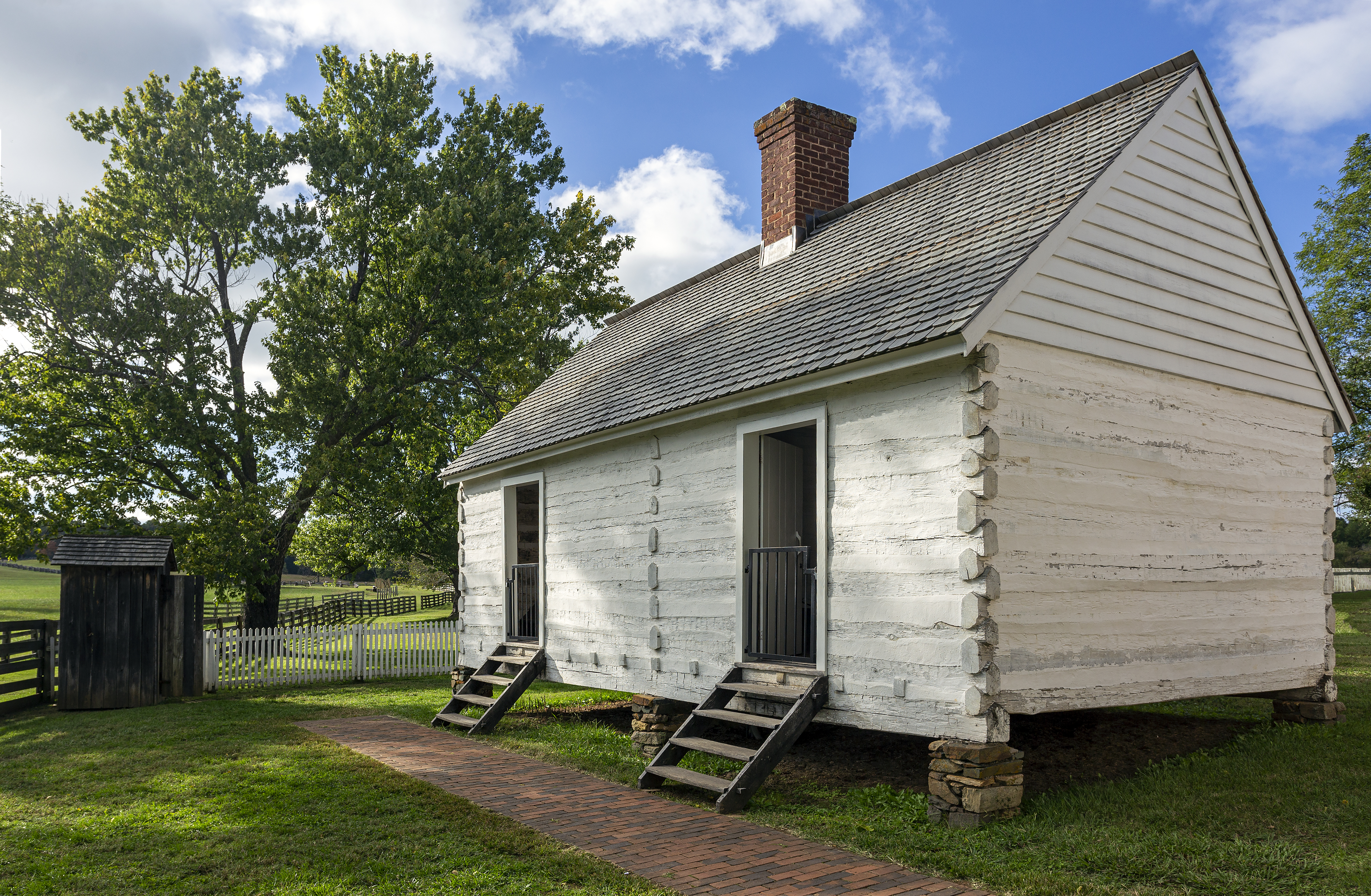
Appomattox Court House National Historical Park, Virginia

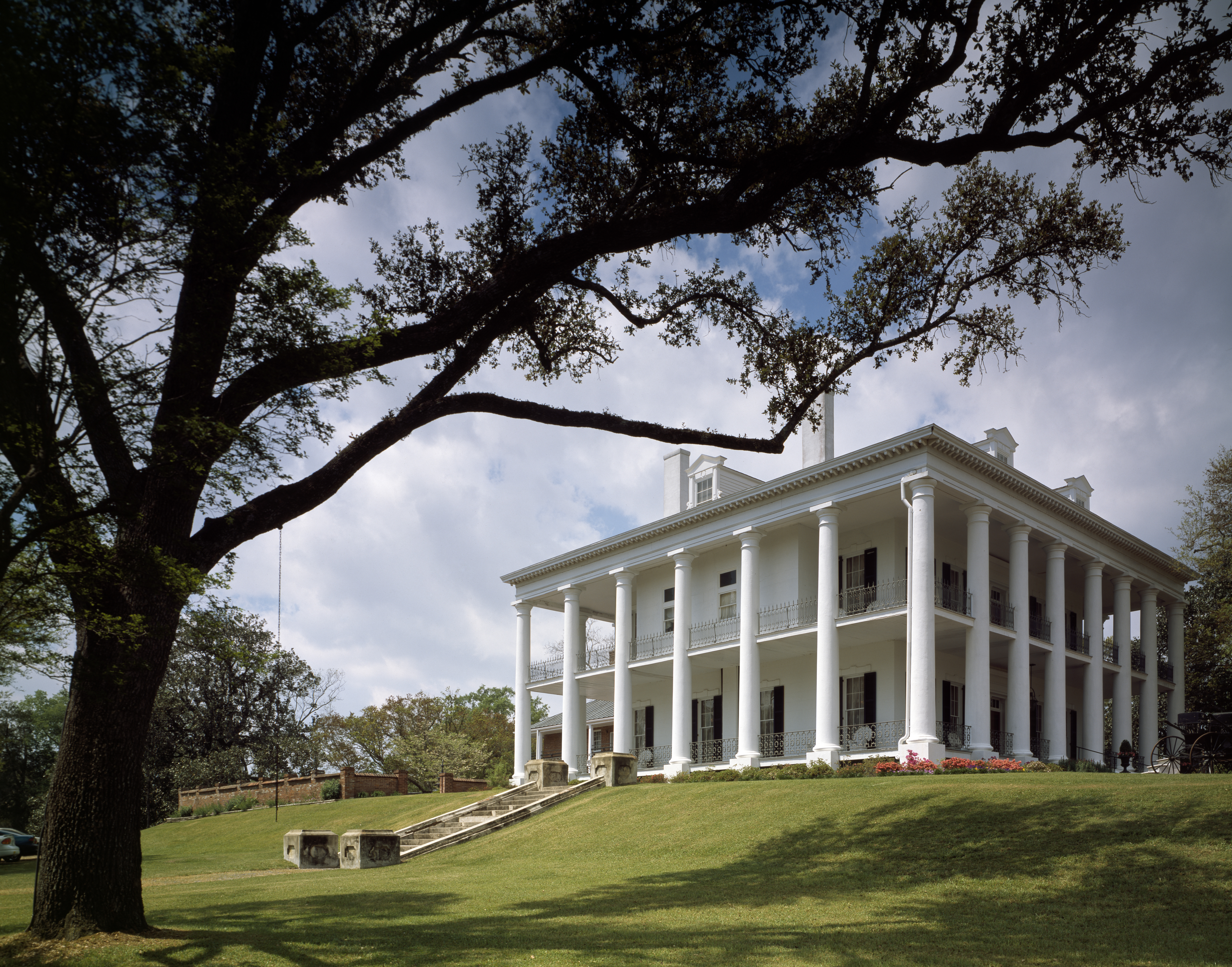
Dunleith antebellum mansion, Natchez, Mississippi

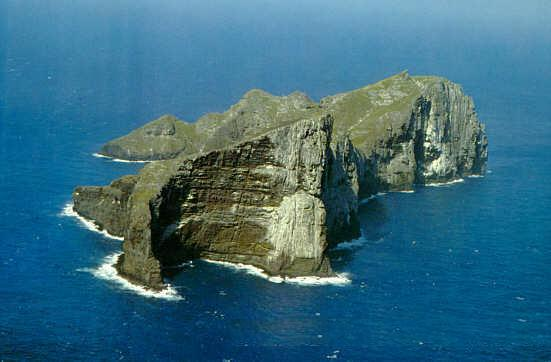
Nīhoa Island Archeological District, Papahānaumokuākea Marine National Monument, Guam

State/territory	# of sites
Alabama	1,331
Alaska	455
American Samoa	31
Arizona	1,506
Arkansas	2,851
California	3,112
Colorado	1,664
Connecticut	1,656
Delaware	708
(Washington, D.C.) District of Columbia	688
Florida	1,913
(Georgia (U.S. state)) Georgia	2,198
Guam	134
Hawaii	384
Idaho	1,092
Illinois	2,000
Indiana	2,179
Iowa	2,494
Kansas	1,695
Kentucky	3,508
Louisiana	1,521
Maine	1,688
Maryland	1,633
Massachusetts	4,452
Michigan	2,004
Minnesota	1,783
Mississippi	1,523
Missouri	2,414
Montana	1,273
Nebraska	1,182
Nevada	392
New Hampshire	825
New Jersey	1,794
New Mexico	1,201
(New York (state)) New York	6,563
North Carolina	3,120
North Dakota	467
Northern Mariana Islands	37
Ohio	4,214
Oklahoma	1,447
Oregon	2,124
Pennsylvania	3,602
Puerto Rico	383
Rhode Island	803
South Carolina	1,663
South Dakota	1,396
Tennessee	2,201
Texas	3,585
(United States) U.S. Minor Outlying Islands	2
Utah	1,923
Vermont	896
(United States Virgin Islands) Virgin Islands	96
Virginia	3,373
(Washington (state)) Washington	1,695
West Virginia	1,135
Wisconsin	2,659
Wyoming	604
Outside the United States	# of sites
Federated States of Micronesia	27
Marshall Islands	4
Morocco	1
Palau	6
Territorial waters	13
(duplicates)	(117) (Note: The following sites are listed in more than one state (listed alphabetically): 1872 California-Nevada State Boundary Marker (California and Nevada), Anderson Ferry (Kentucky and Ohio), Arlington Memorial Bridge (District of Columbia and Virginia), B & O Railroad Potomac River Crossing (Maryland and West Virginia), B & O Railroad Viaduct (Ohio and West Virginia), Bad Pass Trail (Montana and Wyoming), Bedell Covered Bridge (New Hampshire and Vermont), Beginning Point of the U.S. Public Land Survey (Ohio and Pennsylvania), Blood Run Site (Iowa and South Dakota), Bonneville Dam Historic District (Oregon and Washington), Bourne Mill (Massachusetts and Rhode Island), Bristol Commercial Historic District (Tennessee and Virginia), Bristol Virginia–Tennessee slogan sign (Tennessee and Virginia), Brownville Bridge (Missouri and Nebraska), Burr's Ferry Bridge (Louisiana and Texas), Chain of Rocks Bridge (Illinois and Missouri), Chesapeake and Ohio Canal National Historical Park (District of Columbia, Maryland and West Virginia), Chicago, Milwaukee, St. Paul and Pacific Railroad Company Historic District (Idaho and Montana), Chickamauga and Chattanooga National Military Park (Georgia and Tennessee), Civil War Fort Sites (District of Columbia, Maryland, and Virginia), Clingmans Dome Observation Tower (North Carolina and Tennessee), Columbia Covered Bridge (New Hampshire and Vermont), Cornish-Windsor Covered Bridge (New Hampshire and Vermont), Covington and Cincinnati Suspension Bridge (Kentucky and Ohio), Cumberland Gap Historic District (Kentucky, Tennessee and Virginia), Cumberland Gap National Historical Park (Kentucky, Tennessee and Virginia), Delaware Aqueduct (New York and Pennsylvania), Delaware and Hudson Canal (New York and Pennsylvania), Denver & Rio Grande Railroad San Juan Extension (Colorado and New Mexico), Deweyville Swing Bridge (Texas and Louisiana), Dismal Swamp Canal (North Carolina and Virginia), Dual State Monument (Arkansas and Louisiana), Julien Dubuque Bridge (Illinois and Iowa), Eads Bridge (Illinois and Missouri), East Hill Cemetery (Tennessee and Virginia), Fort Madison Bridge (Illinois and Iowa), Fort Union Trading Post National Historic Site (Montana and North Dakota), Francis Scott Key Bridge (District of Columbia and Virginia), Freeman House (North Carolina and Virginia), GW Jeep Site (Virginia and West Virginia), General U.S. Grant Bridge (Kentucky and Ohio), George Washington Memorial Parkway (District of Columbia, Maryland and Virginia), Glenrio Historic District (New Mexico and Texas), Harmony Way Bridge (Illinois and Indiana), Harpers Ferry National Historical Park (Maryland, Virginia and West Virginia), Hells Canyon Archeological District (Idaho and Oregon), Holland Tunnel (New Jersey and New York), Hoover Dam (Arizona and Nevada), International Boundary Marker (Louisiana and Texas), Keokuk Lock and Dam (Illinois and Iowa), Langdale Historic District (Alabama and Georgia), Lemhi Pass (Idaho and Montana), Lewis Bridge (Nebraska and South Dakota), Lock and Dam No. 19 Historic District (Illinois and Iowa), Lock and Dam No. 20 Historic District (Illinois and Missouri), Lock and Dam No. 21 Historic District (Illinois and Missouri), Lolo Trail (Idaho and Montana), Longview Bridge (Oregon and Washington), Louisville Municipal Bridge, Pylons and Administration Building (Indiana and Kentucky), Lower Klamath National Wildlife Refuge (California and Oregon), Mason and Dixon Survey Terminal Point (Pennsylvania and West Virginia), Mason and Dixon West Line Milestone Markers 76 and 77 (Pennsylvania and Maryland), David Mathews House (New York and Vermont), Merestone (Delaware and Pennsylvania), Meridian Bridge (Nebraska and South Dakota), Milanville-Skinners Falls Bridge (New York and Pennsylvania), Minisink Archeological Site (New Jersey and Pennsylvania), Mississippi River Bridge (Louisiana and Mississippi), Mount Orne Covered Bridge (New Hampshire and Vermont), Mount Vernon Memorial Highway (District of Columbia and Virginia), New Castle and Frenchtown Railroad Right-of-Way (Delaware and Maryland), Newport and Cincinnati Bridge (Kentucky and Ohio), Maysville-Aberdeen Bridge (Kentucky and Ohio), Nez Perce Snake River Archeological District (Idaho and Washington), Osgood Ditch (Oregon and California), Palisades Interstate Park (New Jersey and New York), Plattsmouth Bridge (Iowa and Nebraska), Pond Eddy Bridge (New York and Pennsylvania), Potomac Mills (Maryland and West Virginia), Raton Pass (Colorado and New Mexico), Red Lodge-Cooke City Approach Road Historic District (Montana and Wyoming), Riverview Historic District (Alabama and Georgia), Salt River Hydroelectric Powerplant (Idaho and Wyoming), Savanna-Sabula Bridge (Illinois and Iowa), Site No. RH00-062 (Kansas and Nebraska), Site No. JF00-072 (Kansas and Nebraska), Sixth Street Railroad Bridge (Ohio and West Virginia), Soo Line High Bridge (Minnesota and Wisconsin), South Omaha Bridge (Iowa and Nebraska), State Highway 78 Bridge at the Red River (Oklahoma and Texas), State Highway 79 Bridge at the Red River (Oklahoma and Texas), State Line Archeological District (Indiana and Ohio), Statue of Liberty National Monument, Ellis Island and Liberty Island (New Jersey and New York), Stillwater Bridge (Minnesota and Wisconsin), Suitland Parkway (District of Columbia and Maryland), Texarkana Union Station (Arkansas and Texas), Texarkana US Post Office and Courthouse (Arkansas and Texas), Trenton City/Calhoun Street Bridge (New Jersey and Pennsylvania), United States Highway 61 Arch (Arkansas and Missouri), Upper Ditch (Oregon and California), Upper Twin Falls Bridge (Michigan and Wisconsin), Vancouver-Portland Bridge (Oregon and Washington), Washington Aqueduct (District of Columbia and Maryland), Washington Crossing State Park (New Jersey and Pennsylvania), Western Maryland Railroad Right-of-Way, Milepost 126 to Milepost 160 (Maryland and West Virginia), Wheeling Island Historic District (Ohio and West Virginia), Jesse Whitesell House (Kentucky and Tennessee), Willow Beach Gauging Station (Arizona and Nevada), and Yuma Crossing and Associated Sites (Arizona and California).)
Total:	99,323

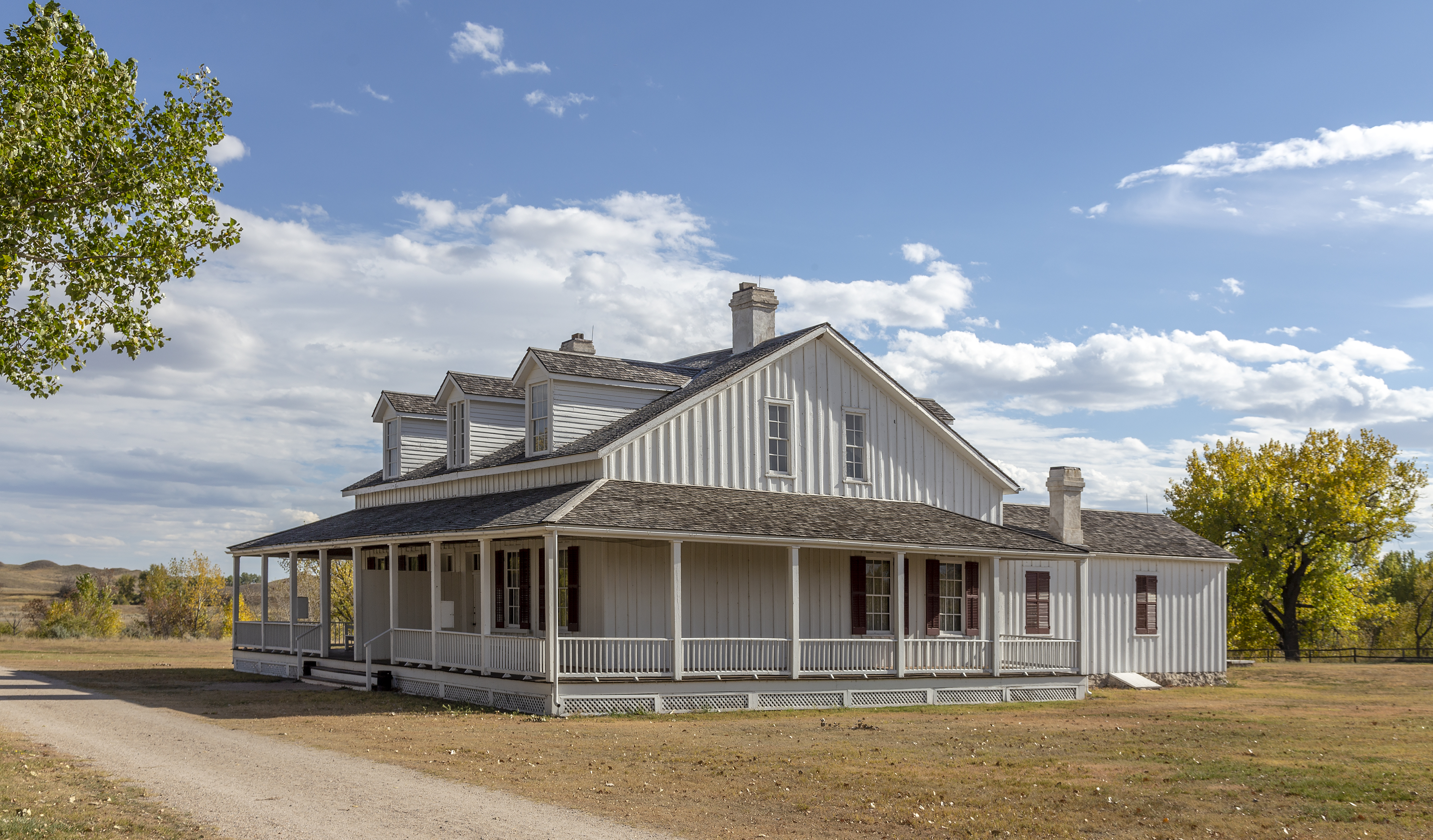
Fort Laramie National Historic Site, Wyoming

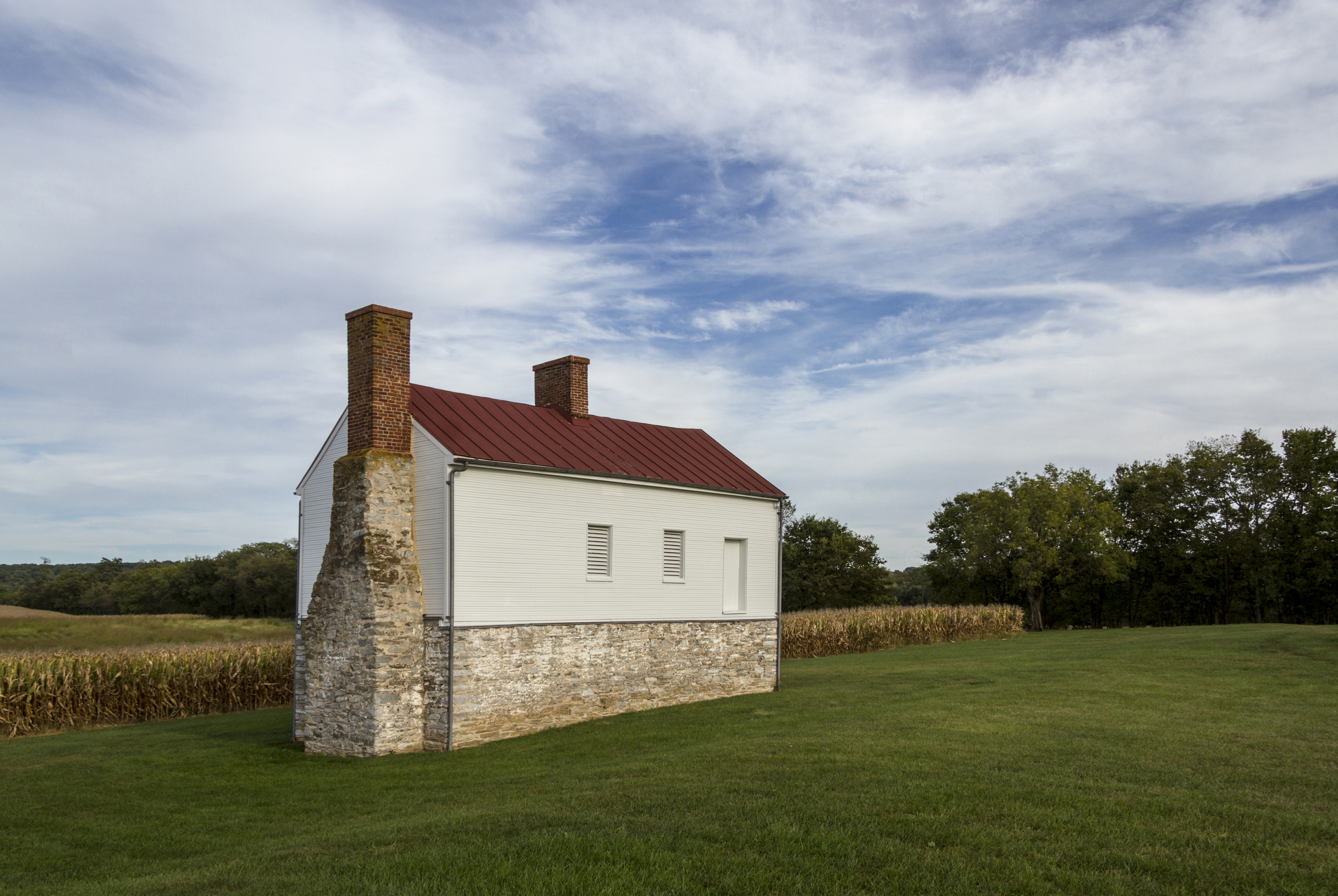
L'Hermitage Slave Village Archeological Site, Maryland

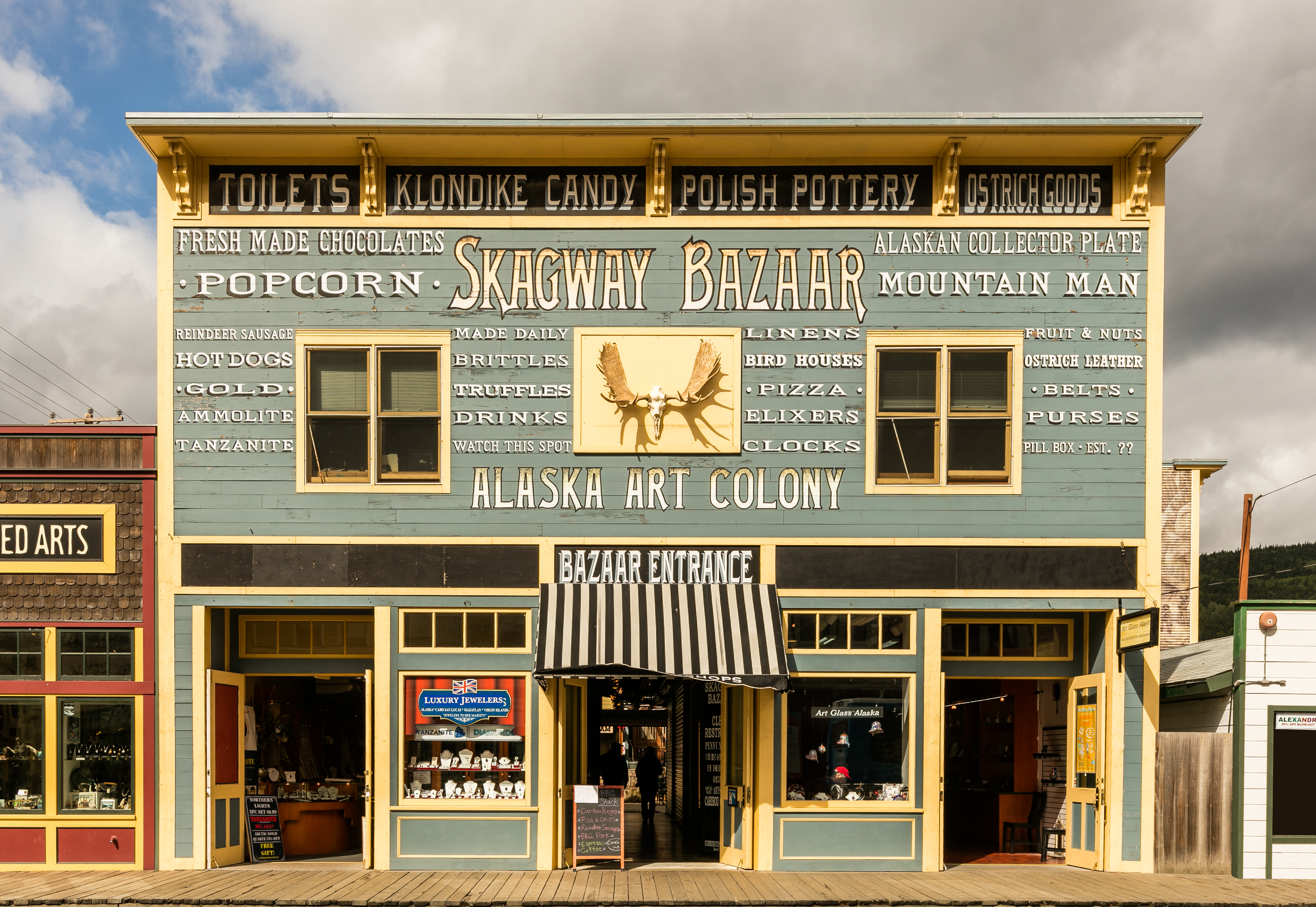
Skagway Historic District and White Pass, Skagway, Alaska

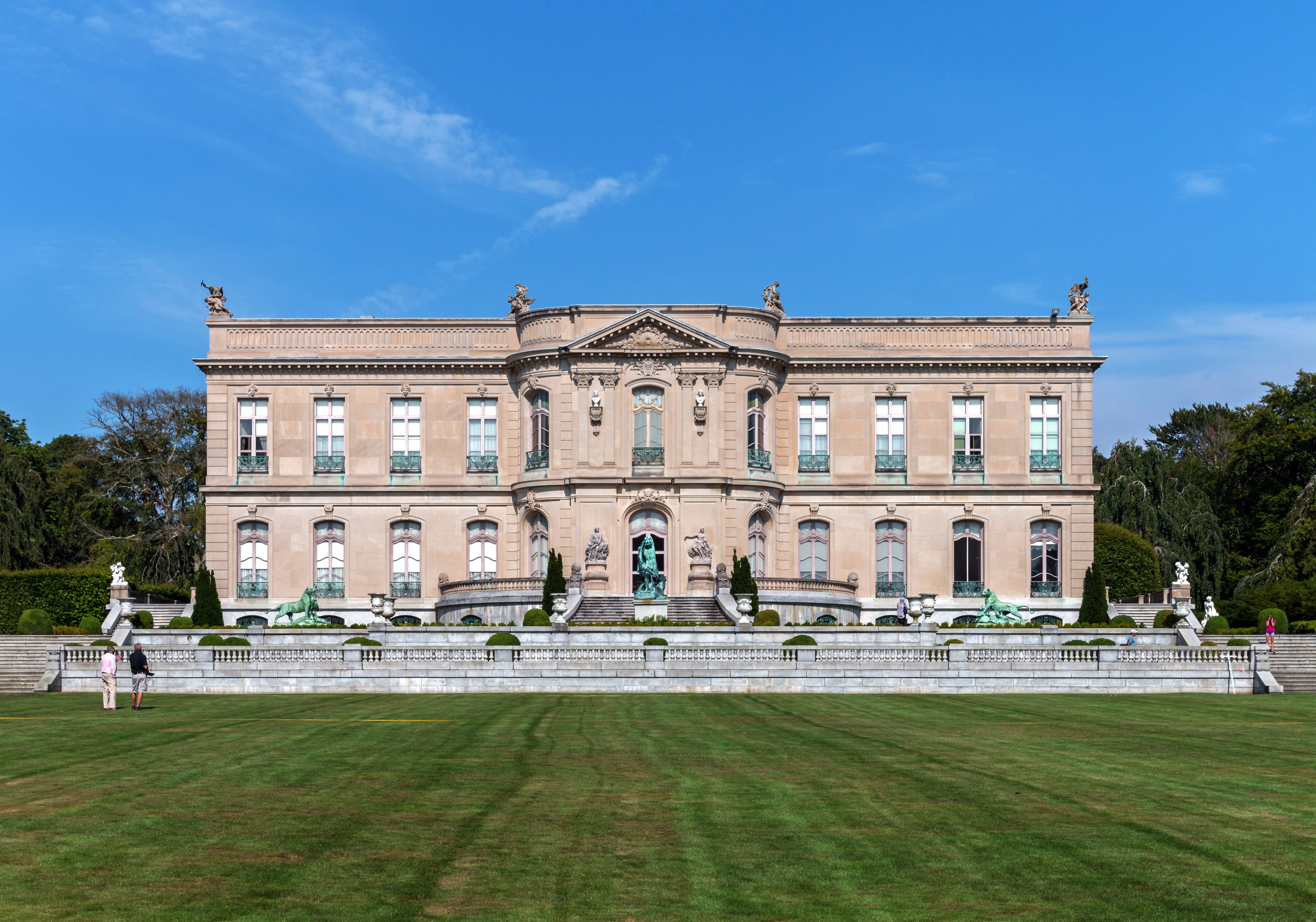
The Elms, Newport, Rhode Island

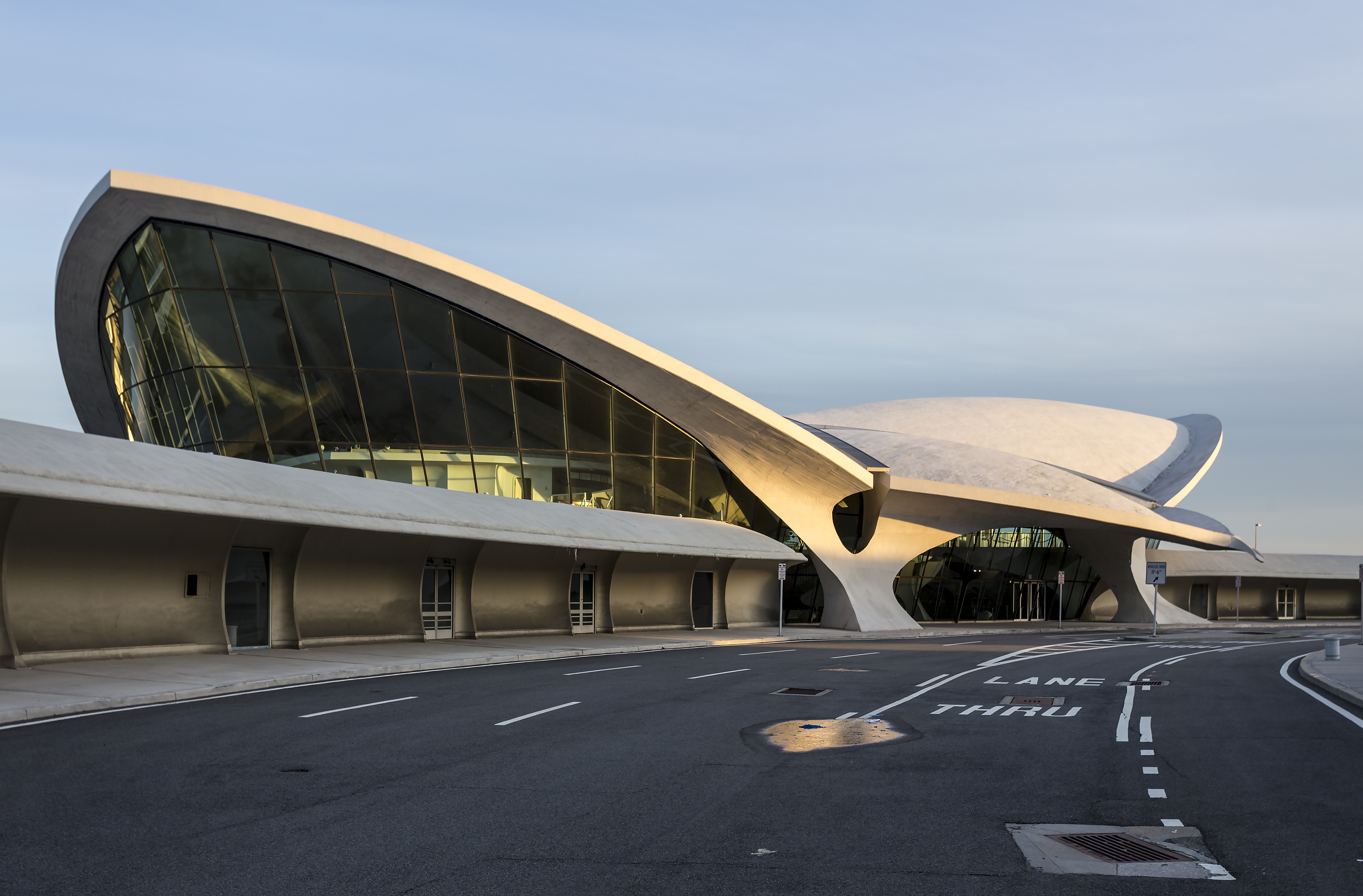
TWA Flight Center, New York City, New York

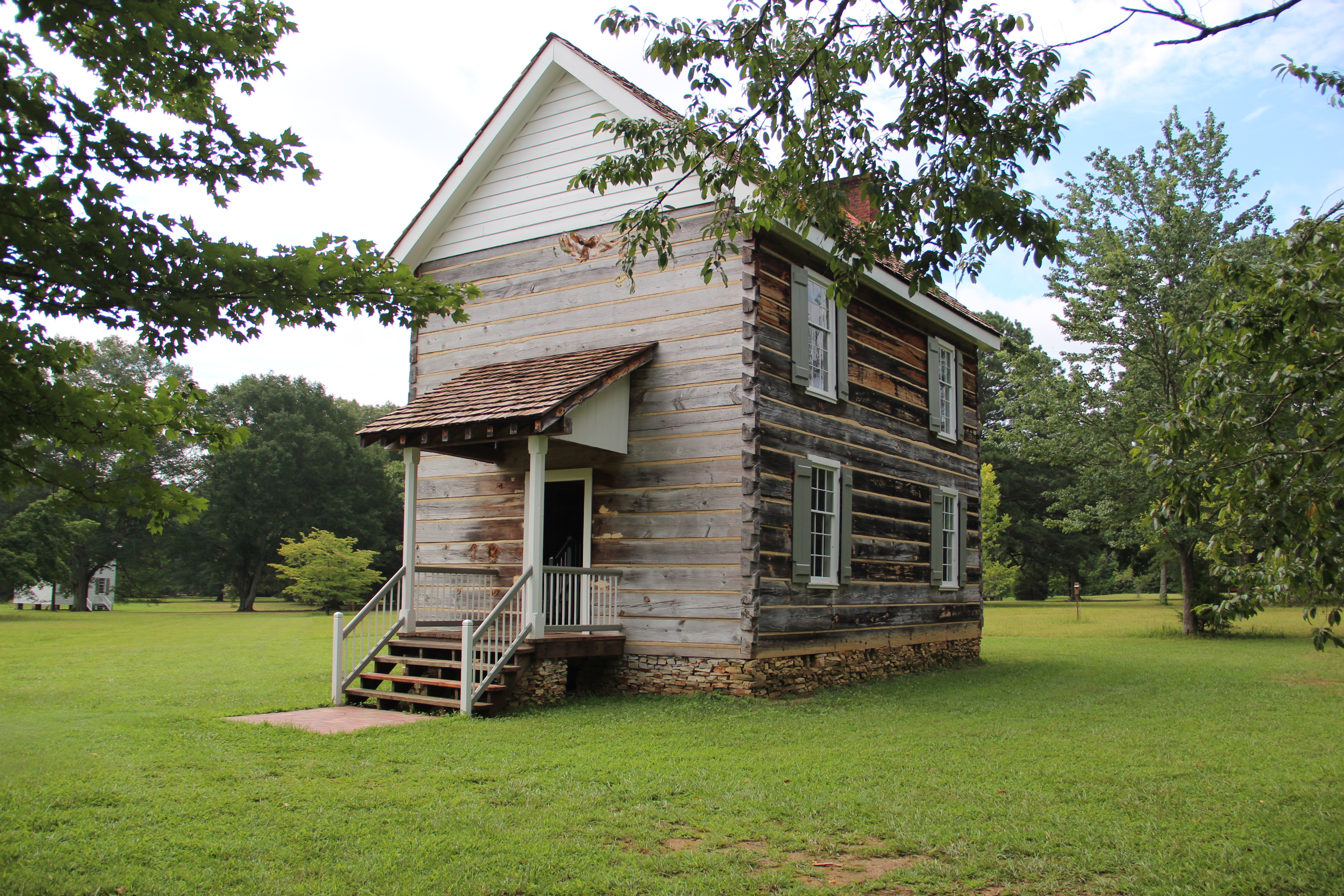
New Echota, Georgia

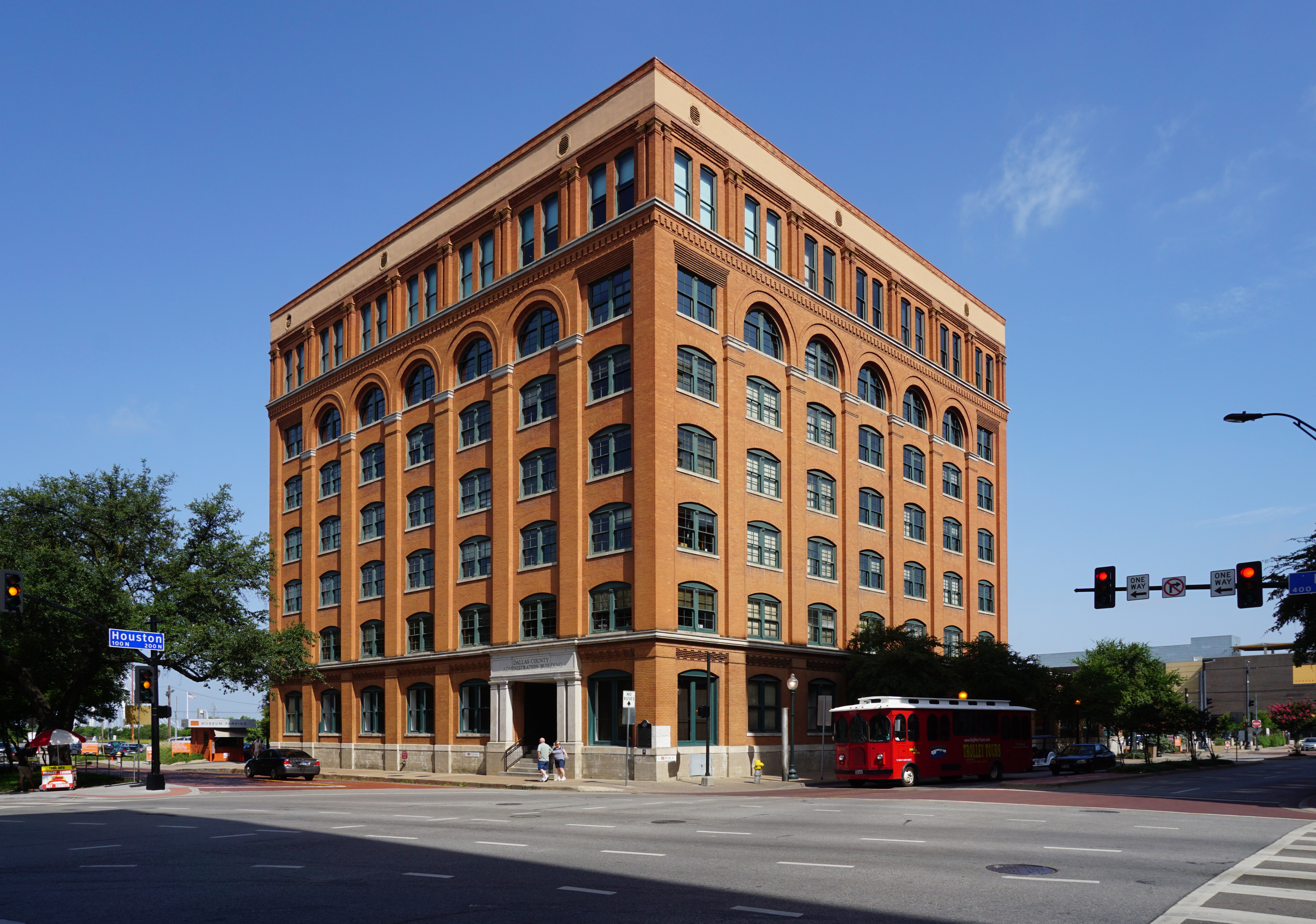
Texas School Book Depository, Dallas, Texas

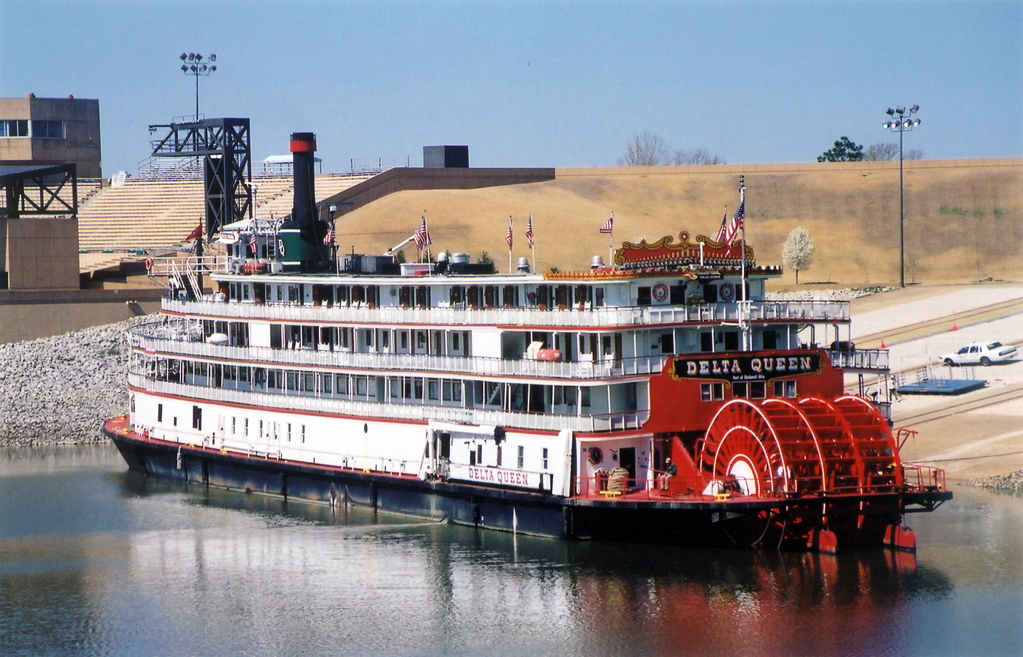
Delta Queen steamboat, Louisiana

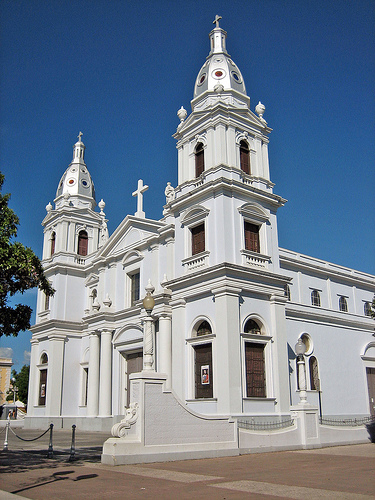
Catedral de Nuestra Señora de Guadalupe, Plaza Las Delicias, Ponce, Puerto Rico

== A map index to the state lists of NRHPs ==

Additional U.S. NRHPs that are not on the map: American Samoa, Guam, Northern Mariana Islands, Puerto Rico, U.S. Minor Outlying Islands, U.S. Virgin Islands

== See also ==
- African American Historic Places
- History of the National Register of Historic Places
- Keeper of the Register
- National Historic Preservation Act of 1966
- Property type (National Register of Historic Places)
- State Historic Preservation Office
