= Art Troutner =

American architect

Art Troutner (1921–2001) was an "innovative and eccentric" American architect, engineer and entrepreneur who was born and mostly worked in the U.S. state of Idaho. He is known, mostly in Idaho, for his innovative works in "Troutner modern" style, within what generally now termed Mid-Century Modern architecture.

He was born Arthur Lowe Troutner on September 29, 1921. He was born in Pingree, Idaho, in eastern Idaho, and grew up on his parents' farm there. He often rode a horse to school. There being no high school there, at age 13 he went to live with his grandmother in Boise, Idaho. He attended Boise High School and the Boise Community College before joining the Army Air Corps and serving in World War II. After the war he studied art and architecture at University of Idaho, graduating with a degree in architecture in 1949.

His barrel-vaulted stadium at University of Idaho may be his most famous work.

In 2008, three of his works in Idaho Falls, Idaho were listed on the U.S. National Register of Historic Places (NRHP) in the Art Troutner Houses Historic District.

He died on April 14, 2001, in San Diego, California.

Works include:

- Phillips House (1958), Boise, Idaho
- Aupperle House, or the "Arrow House", NRHP-listed
