= Idaho Falls City Building =

- U.S. National Register of Historic Places
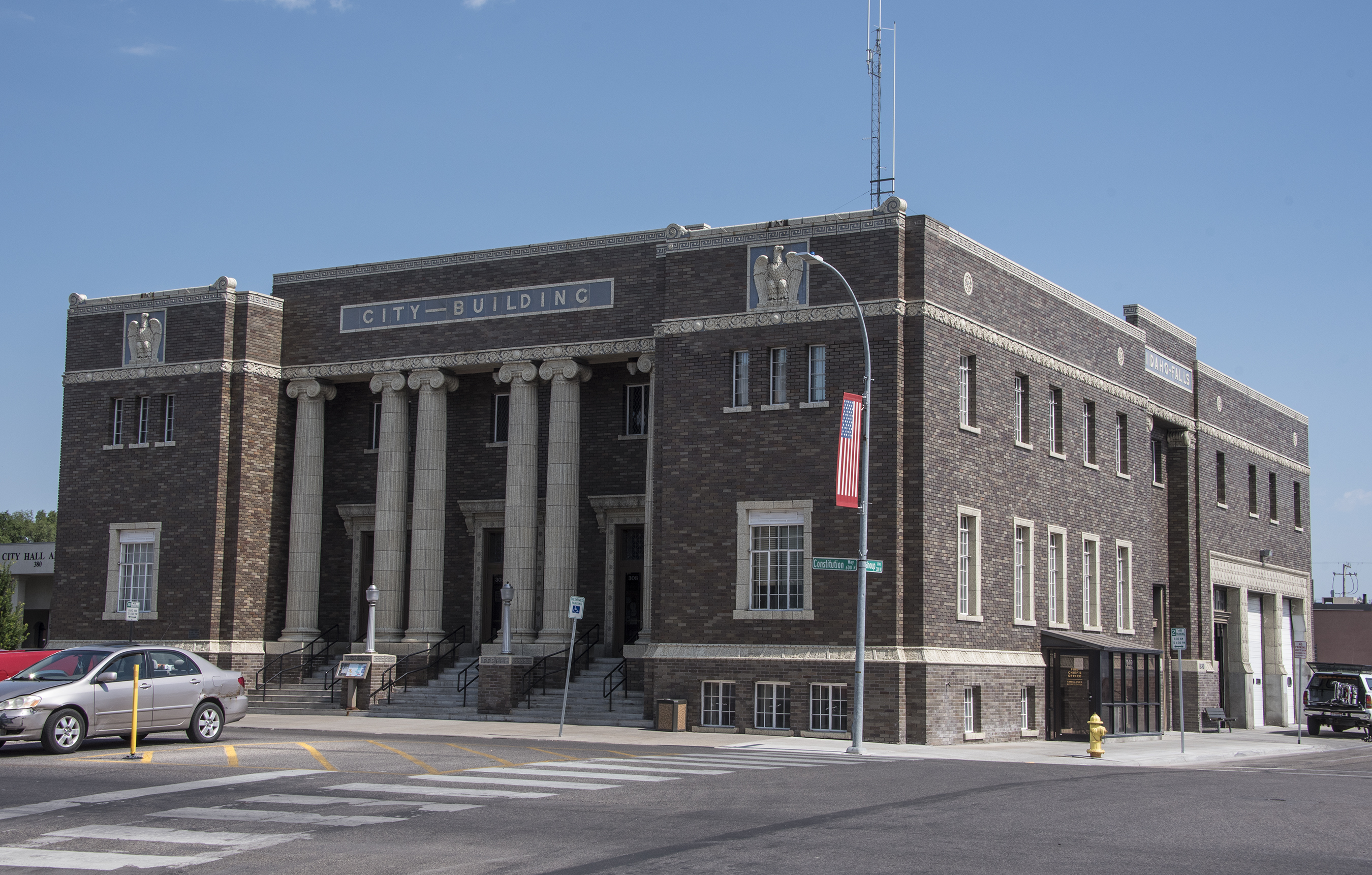
- The building in 2017

- Location within Idaho Location within the United States
- Location: 303 West C Street, Idaho Falls, Idaho
- Coordinates: 43°29′39″N 112°02′15″W
- Area: less than one acre
- Built: 1929
- MPS: Idaho Falls Downtown MRA
- NRHP reference No.: 84001092
- Added to NRHP: August 30, 1984

The Idaho Falls City Office Building is a historic building in Idaho Falls, Idaho. It was built in 1929-1930 as a rectangular structure with "double fluted Ionic columns," reminiscent of Beaux-Arts architecture. It has been listed on the National Register of Historic Places since August 30, 1984.
