= New Sweden School =

- U.S. National Register of Historic Places
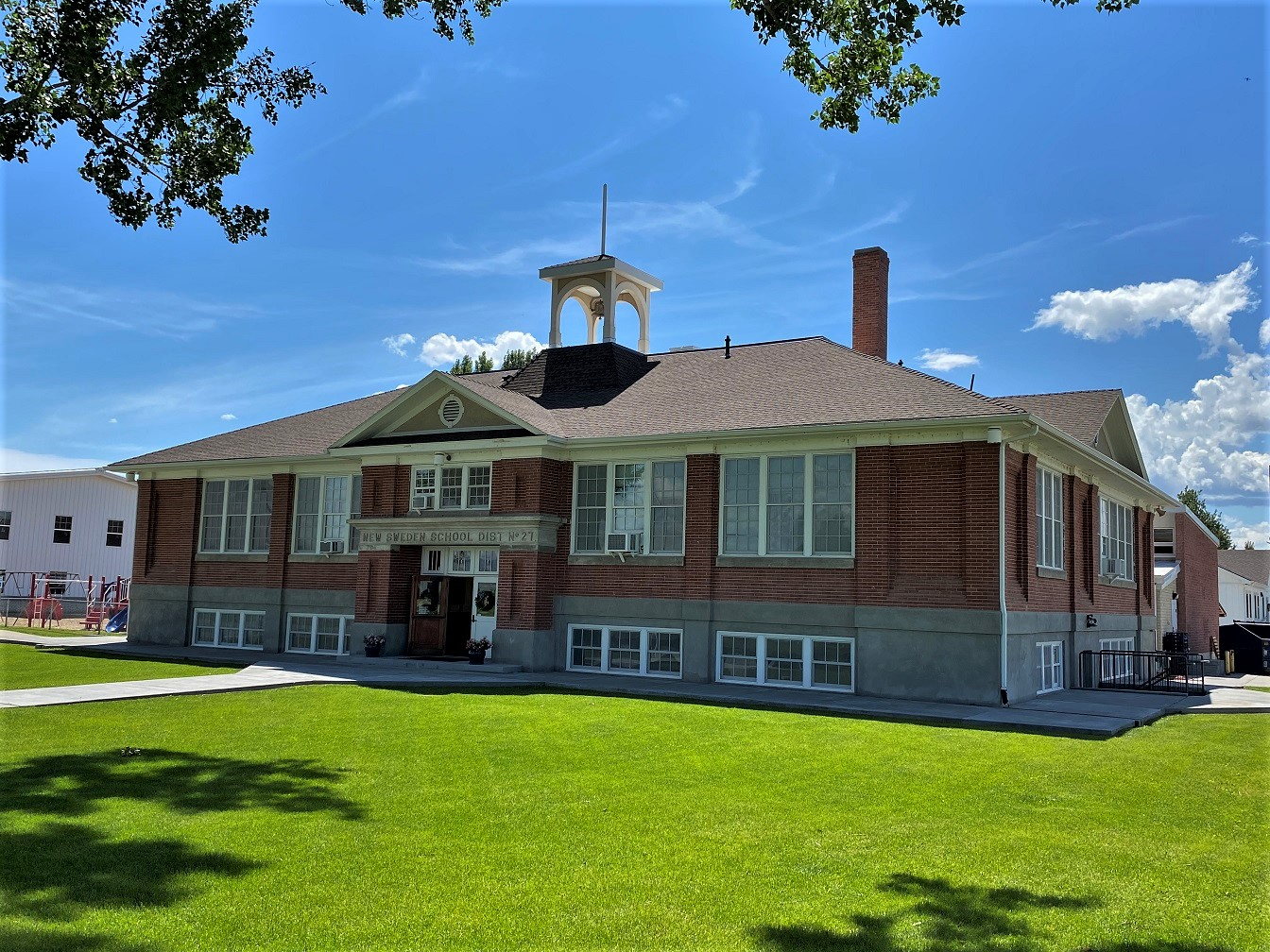
- School building in 2023

- Location within Idaho Location within the United States
- Location: Southwestern corner of the junction of New Sweden School Rd. and Mill Rd., Idaho Falls, Idaho
- Coordinates: 43°28′55″N 112°06′12″W
- Area: 2 acres (0.81 ha)
- Built: 1927
- Built by: S. C. Crabtree; C. W. & M. Company
- Architect: F. L. McGrew
- Architectural style: Colonial Revival
- NRHP reference No.: 91001714
- Added to NRHP: November 19, 1991

The New Sweden School is a school located in the town of New Sweden, Idaho (part of Idaho Falls). It was listed on the National Register of Historic Places in 1991. The school was built in 1927 and is historically significant due to its association with the Swedish American immigrant communities of New Sweden and Riverview.

The school's period of significance was from 1925 to 1949, and the building had been used by the community until 1980. Since then, the property has been the target of significant vandalism. The Idaho Falls School District #91 declared the school as surplus property, and in 2012, accepted a bid for its sale to VanderSloot Farms for $121,000.

== Restoration of the New Sweden School ==
The New Sweden School building has been restored with attention to preserving the history of the building. It is now a fully functioning charter school called American Heritage Charter School. Another school building has been added on to the original property.

== See also ==
- List of National Historic Landmarks in Idaho
- National Register of Historic Places listings in Bonneville County, Idaho
