= Bonneville County Courthouse =

- U.S. National Register of Historic Places
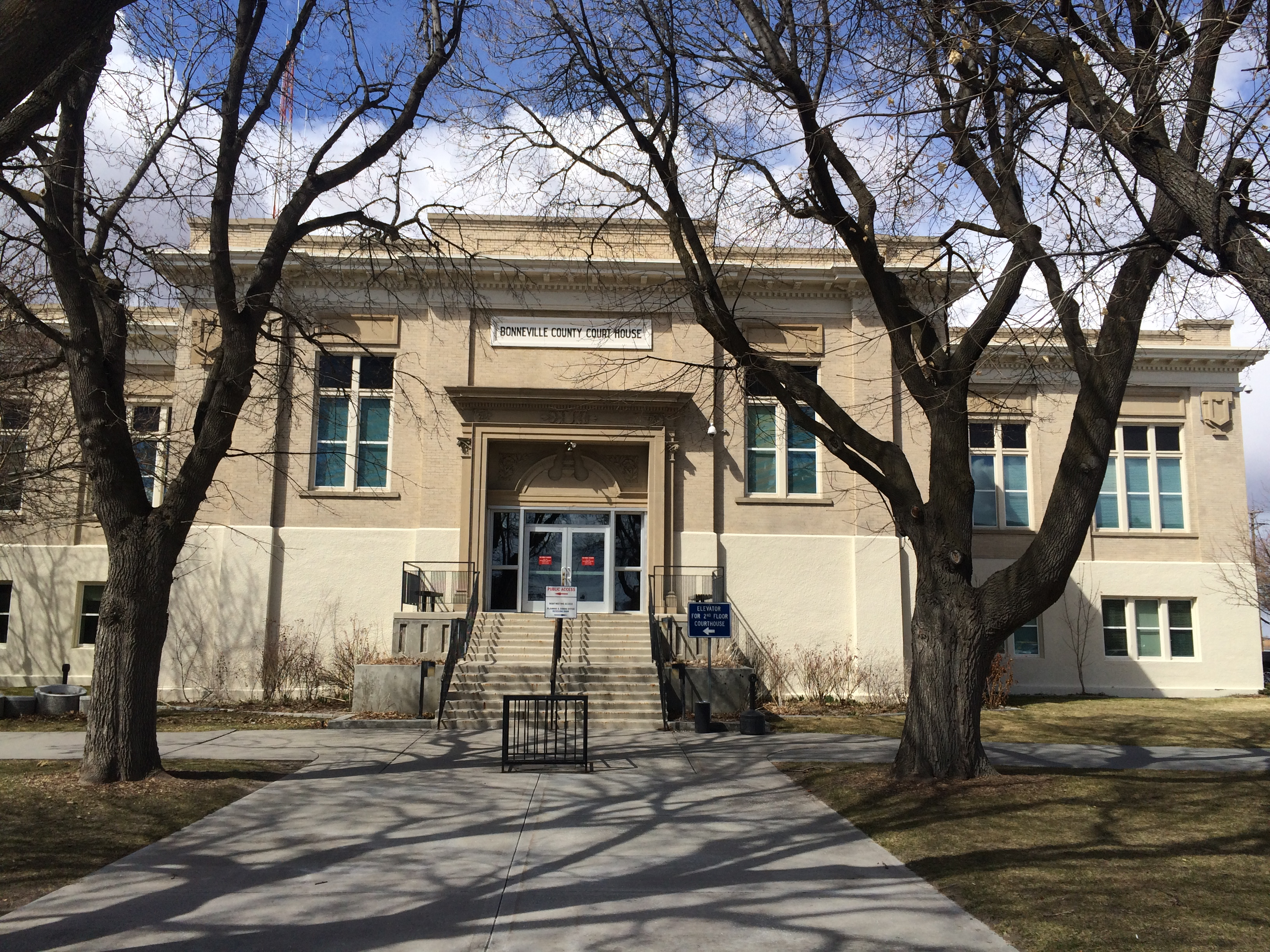
- The courthouse in 2016

- Location within Idaho Location within the United States
- Interactive map showing the location of Bonneville County Courthouse
- Location: Capital Avenue and C Street, Idaho Falls, Idaho
- Coordinates: 43°29′42″N 112°02′25″W
- Area: less than one acre
- Built: 1921
- Architect: Lionel E. Fisher, Charles Aitken
- NRHP reference No.: 79000781
- Added to NRHP: July 10, 1979

The Bonneville County Courthouse is a historic building in Idaho Falls, Idaho, and the courthouse of Bonneville County, Idaho. It was built in 1921 with reinforced concrete, sandstone from Boise, and there is a marble staircase inside. The entrance includes "an entablature supported by Corinthian pilasters" and "a round arch with garlanded spandrels". It was designed by architects Lionel E. Fisher and Charles Aitken. It has been listed on the National Register of Historic Places since July 10, 1979.
