= Heise, Idaho =

Unincorporated community in the state of Idaho, United States

Coordinates: 43.641°N 111.685°W

Heise is an unincorporated community on the north side of the Snake River in Jefferson County in the U.S. state of Idaho.

== History ==
Heise was founded by Richard Camor Heise, a German immigrant, between 1890 and 1900 around the hot springs in the vicinity, now named the Heise Hot Springs. By 1900, he had constructed a hotel and store, and obtained a post office to serve his spa. The spa remains popular to this day. An area north of Heise was the location of quarries which provided stone for the Trinity Methodist Church in Idaho Falls, Idaho.

Heise was incorporated as a village in 1949, changed to a city in 1967, but disincorporated in 1974. Heise's population was 58 in 1909, and was 87 in 1950, 64 in 1960, and 84 in 1970.
