= Art Troutner Houses Historic District =

Historic houses in Idaho, United States

- U.S. National Register of Historic Places
- U.S. Historic district
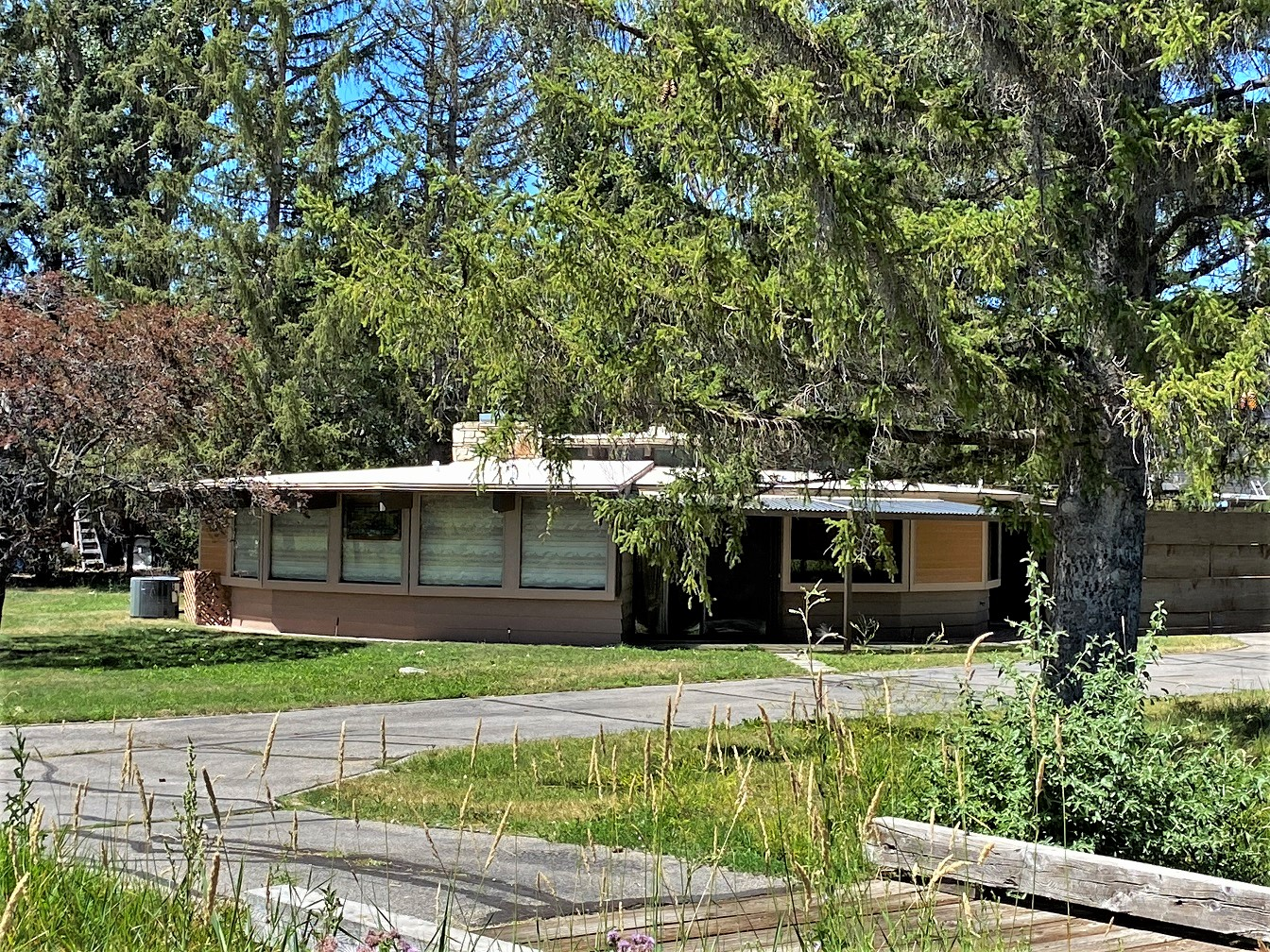
- Ada Poitevin House (1956) in 2023

- Location within Idaho Location within the United States
- Location: 3950, 4012 and 4032 S. 5th W., Idaho Falls, Idaho
- Coordinates: 43°27′38″N 112°2′35″W
- Area: 7.5 acres (30,000 m^{2})
- Built: 1955, 1956
- Architect: Art Troutner
- Architectural style: Modern
- NRHP reference No.: 08000868
- Added to NRHP: September 10, 2008

Art Troutner Houses Historic District is a roughly triangular historic district in Idaho Falls, Idaho containing three private houses designed by architect and entrepreneur Art Troutner. This district was listed on the National Register of Historic Places on September 10, 2008. It is the 11th property listed as a featured listing of the week in a program of the National Park Service that began in July 2008.

== Aupperle Studio ==
The Aupperle Studio, also known as "Arrow House", is located at 3950 S. 5th W. on a 3.3 acres (1.3 ha) plot. It is single-story but tall house with an A-frame design. It is 64 by 29 feet (19.5 m × 8.8 m) in plan and 32 feet (9.8 m) tall. One unusual aspect of the house is its extensive use of "Cemento" or "Cemesto" material, including in 2 by 8 feet (0.61 m × 2.44 m) roof panels. This is a bonded mix of cementitious material and asbestos.

== Migel House ==
The Migel House is located at 4032 S. 5th W.

== Poitevin House ==
The Ada Poitevin House is located at 4012 S. 5th W. It has, essentially, 16 sides.
