= Mazomanie Downtown Historic District =

Historic district in Wisconsin, United States

- U.S. National Register of Historic Places
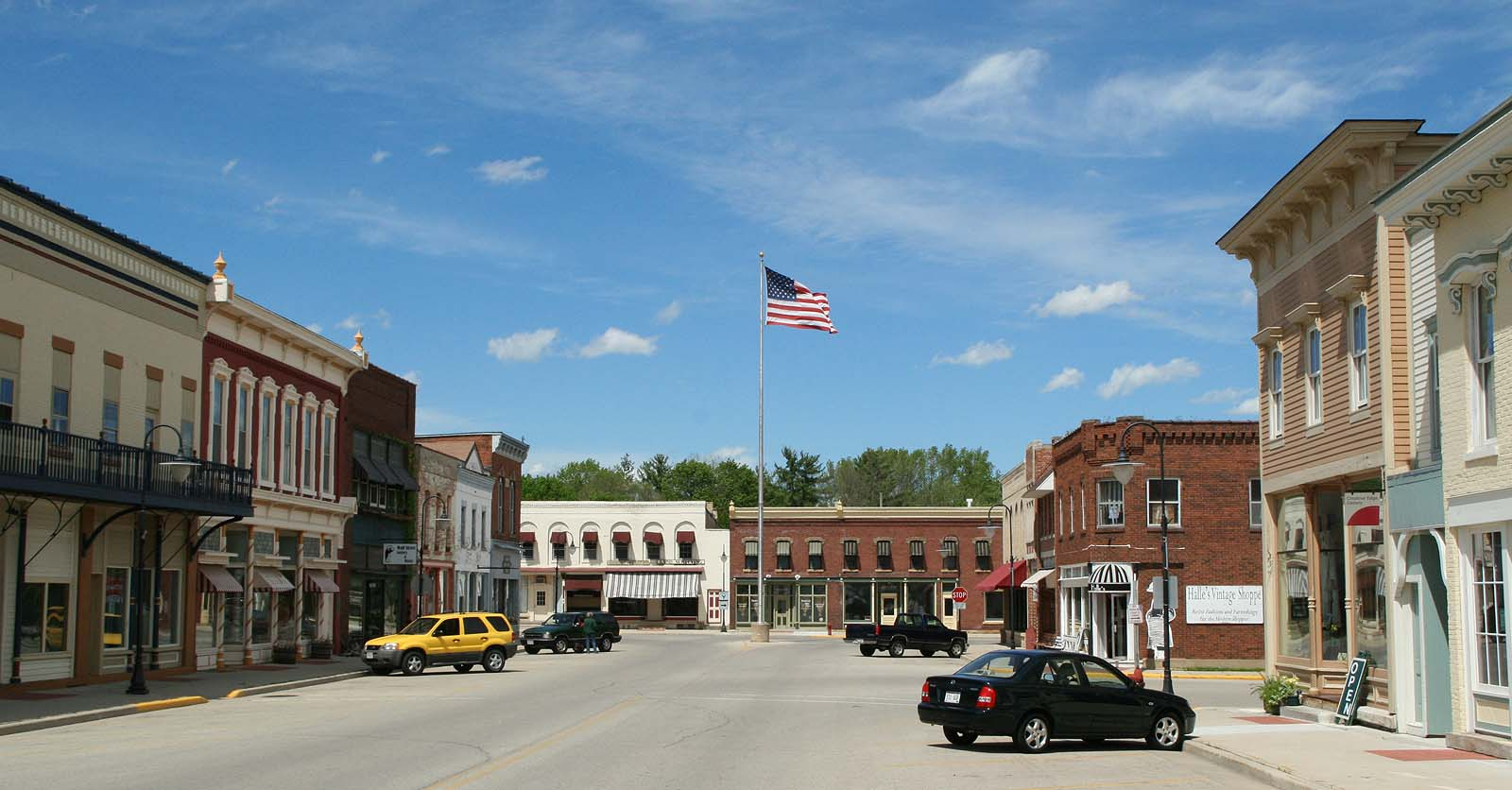
- A portion of the district.
- Location: 1-118 Brodhead, 2-46 Hudson, 37-105 Crescent and 113 E. Exchange Sts., Mazomanie, Wisconsin
- Area: 15.2 acres (6.2 ha)
- NRHP reference No.: 92000406
- Added to NRHP: August 19, 1992

The Mazomanie Downtown Historic District is the old downtown of Mazomanie, Wisconsin, with surviving structures built as early as 1857. It was added to the State and the National Register of Historic Places in 1992.

The first settlers in the area around Mazomanie arrived in 1844 - English immigrants sent by British Temperance Emigration Society, a collective which selected members by drawing lots to be set up with 80-acre farms in Dane County. By 1849 600 of these lucky ones had arrived. They were producing a little surplus wheat, but with no local market they were not prospering, and the emigration society stopped funding more arrivals.

When the Milwaukee and Mississippi Railroad picked its route west, its planners chose the valley of Black Earth Creek to get from the higher ground around Madison down into the valley of the Wisconsin River. When the line was built through this area in 1855, it saw a promising town site and platted out what would become the downtown. The first buildings went up that year. The railroad reached the new town the following year.

Here are some of the more interesting surviving buildings, roughly in the order built:

- The Mazomanie Railroad Depot at 102 Brodhead St. was built in 1857 to replace the short-lived depot that burned the year before. The new depot was originally 100 feet long, with a freight depot on one end. In 1880 it was remodeled and again in 1911. In 1945 the freight room was removed. Today it is one of the oldest surviving wooden depots in the state.
- The west end of the Lynch and Walker Flouring Mill at 113 E. Exchange St. was probably built about 1857. By 1886 it had grown to 160 feet long, with walls of rough-cut fieldstone and a gable roof. The west end was a warehouse, the middle section held two water-powered turbines, and the east end was a three-story flour mill, with stone grinders, Allis roller mills, and various separators and scourers. A fire in 1900 damaged the mill, but it rebuilt and continued operation.
- The John Davidson store at 2 East Hudson St., built about 1859, is the only survivor from Mazomanie's first generation of wooden stores. The facade has been changed, but it still has the cornice returns typical of Greek Revival style and an original round-topped window centered in the gable. Originally it had a third window in the second story, making the windows symmetric, and the first story storefront featured large display windows sheltered by a flat-roofed open porch supported by four columns.
- The Charles Butz store at 8-10 Brodhead St., built in 1863, is one of Mazomanie's oldest and most intact stores. The street-level storefront features large plate-glass windows with the original cast iron support columns. Above are brick walls pierced by three tall windows with simple cut-stone sills and segmental arched tops. Above that is a simple brick cornice. The building first housed Butz's general store.
- The Frank Dietz Store at 4 Brodhead St., right next to the Butz store, was also built in 1863, and is also very intact. Here too the storefront is plate glass windows and cast iron columns. Above are simple windows. Above that is a more ornate cornice, and above that a centered pediment which is the end of the gable roof behind the facade.
- The original portion of Parman's Blacksmith and Carriage Shop at 105 Crescent St. was built in 1865 and later expanded. It is a two-story brick building with some large carriage doors and segmental arches over some windows. It continued use as a blacksmith shop through the tenure of Werner Thiers and into the 1980s.
- The N.D. Crosby Store at 39 Brodhead St. is an intact 2-story brick building built about 1866. At street level the right bay is a storefront with a door flanked by cast iron columns and display windows. At the left is a door leading to the second story. The second story has three windows and above them a brick parapet. Behind the parapet is a sensible gable roof.
- The original right-most portion of the C.J. Trager building at 38-40 Crescent St. was built in 1868 to house Trager's carriage-manufacturing business. In 1875 he expanded the building to the west, housing a blacksmith shop in the first story. In 1882 he expanded the building again, converting the newer building into a restaurant and saloon and the original part into his home. The building is two stories, brick, with a hip and gable roof.
- The J.A. Schmitz block at 18 Brodhead St. (second from left in photo above) is a 2-story brick business block built in 1879 to house Schmitz' dry goods store. The street-level front (now modified) was originally four-light glass display windows and cast iron columns. Above that, the front is largely intact, in fine commercial Italianate style. Each window is framed in a cut-stone design that one could imagine in a European parliament building. The wall is topped with a wood and metal cornice supported by brackets. The second story originally housed "Schmitz Hall," a meeting hall with stage where the Ringling Bros. Classic Concert Co. gave an early performance.
- The Masonic Lodge Block at 2 Brodhead St. was built in 1888, two stories, brown brick. The street-level storefront is plate-glass windows in cast iron frames with cast iron columns. The second story is tall, with two dignified windows topped with cut stone lintels with Masonic designs. At the top of the wall is a bracketed metal cornice. Inside, the second story was the Masons' hall.
- The Joseph Hausmann Store at 31 Brodhead Street was built in 1890, a 2-story brick and stone structure. At street level the left and right sides are asymmetric, separated by brick pilasters. The left contained the store entrance, flanked by display windows. The right side contained a door leading to the second story. The second story has four windows with broad lintels, and above that a brick parapet topped with a wood cornice.
- The Arthur J. Lamboley block at 28-34 Brodhead Street (at left in above photo) is a 2-story brick block begun in 1891 by Lamboley on the site of the Carlisle House Hotel, which had burned the year before. That first section had two stores with show windows and iron columns at street level and apartments above. The building was topped with a simple brick parapet. In 1896 Lamboley added a wooden balcony across the front of the building. In 1907 the next owner, Ed Larson, built a matching building to the north. In 1909 he built a third matching building. Then he added a fancier cornice across the buildings. Even with the cornice upgrade, the styling is considered Commercial Vernacular - not high-style.

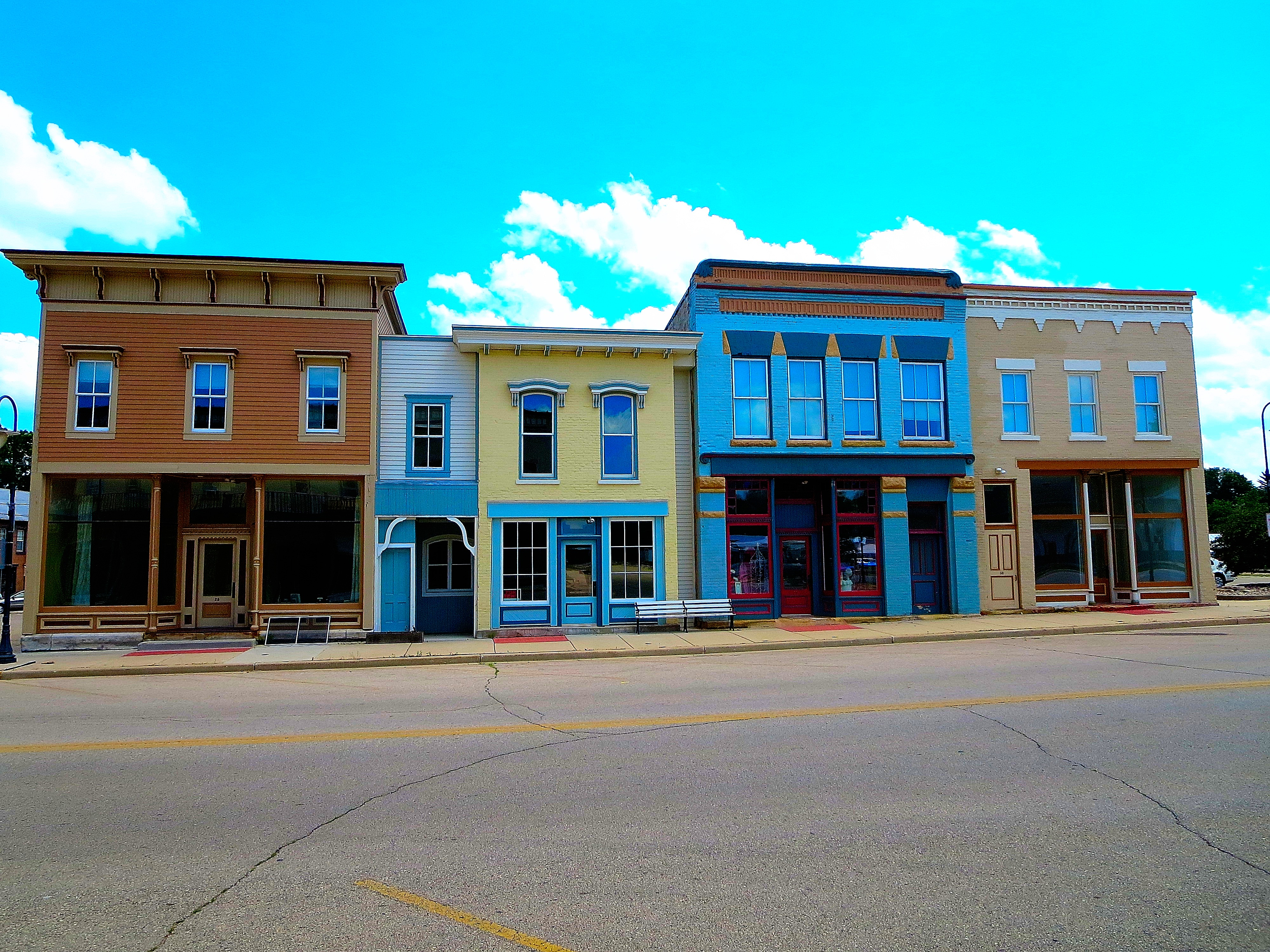
Vogel, Peters, Hausmann, and Crosby buildings at 25-39 Brodhead St.

- The C.R. Vogel Store at 25 Brodhead St. is a wooden store built in 1891, with display windows at street-level. Above that are three windows with wooden hood moulds. At the top is a wooden cornice supported by seven brackets.
- The Henry Lappley building at 18 East Hudson St. is a 2-story brick building built in 1898. Lappely's jewelry store was in the left end and his home in the right. The display windows and cast iron support columns are much as when built. The windows are crowned with brick hood moulds and the top of the building features a wood and metal cornice.
- The Mazomanie Sickle building at 46 Crescent St. is a one-story Boomtown-style building that was built in 1902 by H.L. Swan to house his newspaper.
- The Phillip Hamm Livery Barn at 46 East Hudson St. is a gambrel-roofed barn built in 1908 with walls of vertical board and batten. Hamm used the barn for his livery and for his feed business.
- The Sunrise Oil Co. Filling Station at 101 Crescent St. is a small one-story gas station built in 1925 with a hip roof with the eave extended on the front to protect customers from the weather.
- The Mazomanie Community Building at 9-11 Brodhead St. was built in 1935. It was designed by Frank Moulton in Tudor Revival style, and housed the library, an auditorium, and meeting rooms.
