= Trinity Methodist Church (Idaho Falls, Idaho) =

Historic church in Idaho, United States

- U.S. National Register of Historic Places
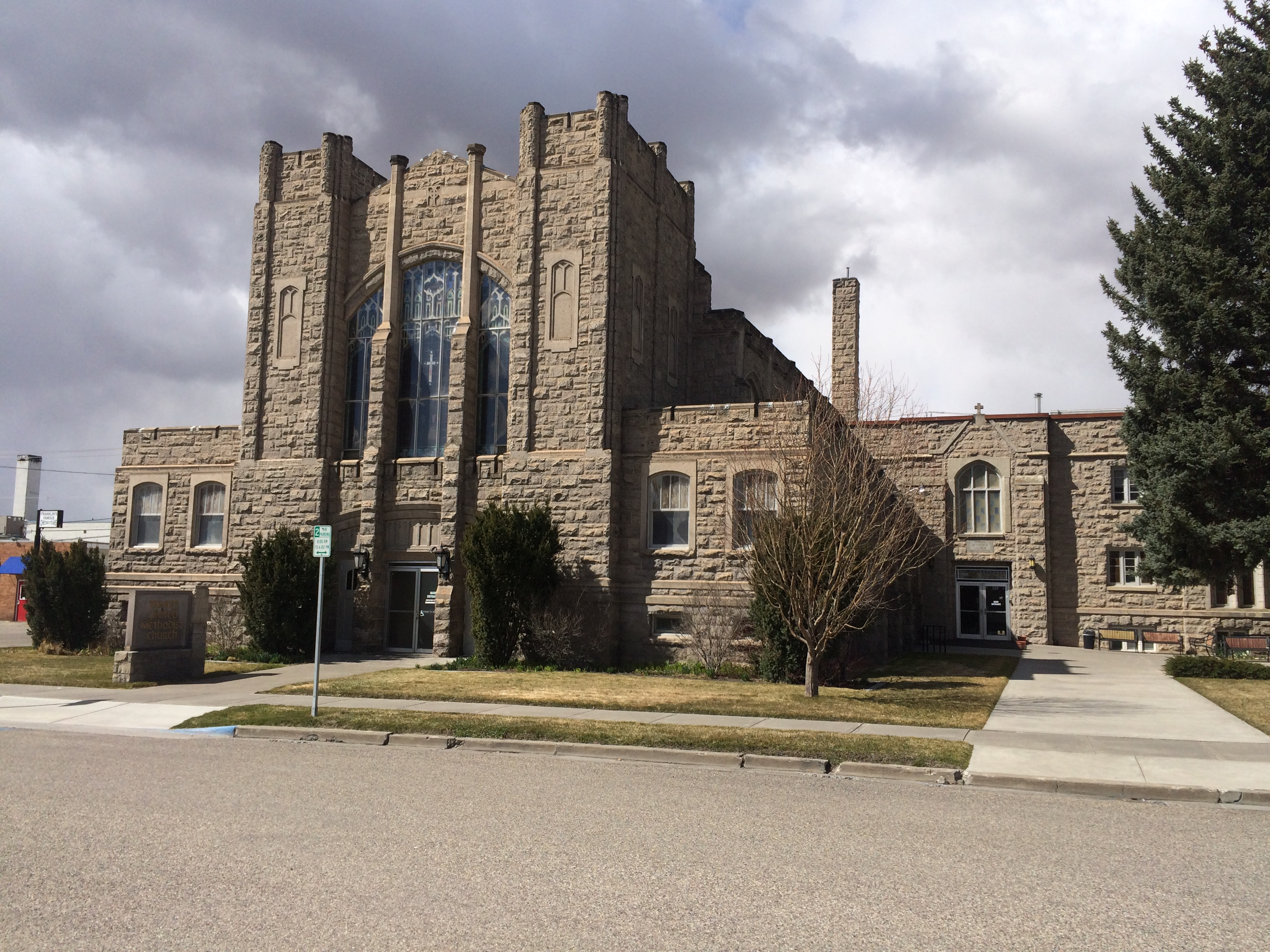

- Location within Idaho Location within the United States
- Location: 237 N. Water Ave. Idaho Falls, Idaho
- Coordinates: 43°29′25″N 112°2′13″W
- Area: less than one acre
- Built: 1916-1917
- Architect: John Visser
- Architectural style: Late 19th And 20th Century Revivals, Tudor-Gothic
- NRHP reference No.: 77000458
- Added to NRHP: December 16, 1977

Trinity Methodist Church is a historic church at 237 N. Water Avenue in Idaho Falls, Idaho. It was built during 1916 to 1917 and was added to the National Register in 1977.

It is a "massive rusticated stone structure in the Tudor-Gothic style." It was built of stone quarried north of Heise. It was asserted in its NRHP nomination that it "typifies the Tudor-Gothic style, with its lack of steeples and flattened arches over large stained glass windows with intricate tracery. Although the short towers, clerestory, and side aisles are symmetrically placed, a Sunday school wing on the north and an octagonal tower on the southwest corner create a feeling of picturesque irregularity. Stone buttresses and pilasters provide the vertical thrust in the design."

A Sunday School wing was added in 1948.
