= National Register of Historic Places listings in United States territorial waters =

This is a list of the buildings, sites, districts, and objects listed on the National Register of Historic Places in the territorial waters of the United States. There are currently 13 listed sites, all of shipwrecks located in the Gulf of Mexico.

This National Park Service list is complete through NPS recent listings posted February 6, 2026.

== Listings ==
	Name on the Register	Image	Date listed	Location	City or town	Description
1	Ewing Bank (Shipwreck)		January 29, 2026 (#100010329)	Address restricted	Gulf of Mexico	
2	Green Lantern Shipwreck	Green Lantern Shipwreck	January 29, 2026 (#100010322)	Address restricted	Gulf of Mexico	
3	Mardi Gras (Shipwreck)		January 29, 2026 (#100010326)	Address restricted	Gulf of Mexico	
4	Mica (Shipwreck)		January 29, 2026 (#100010324)	Address restricted	Gulf of Mexico	
5	Monterrey A (Shipwreck)		January 29, 2026 (#100010331)	Address restricted	Gulf of Mexico	
6	Monterrey B (Shipwreck)		January 29, 2026 (#100010332)	Address restricted	Gulf of Mexico	
7	Monterrey C (Shipwreck)		January 29, 2026 (#100010333)	Address restricted	Gulf of Mexico	
8	SS New York (Shipwreck)		January 29, 2026 (#100010323)	Address restricted	Gulf of Mexico	Possibly the 1837 steamship.
9	Shipwreck 15373-7000 Foot Shipwreck	Shipwreck 15373-7000 Foot Shipwreck	January 29, 2026 (#100010327)	Address restricted	Gulf of Mexico	
10	Shipwreck 15377		January 29, 2026 (#100010328)	Address restricted	Gulf of Mexico	
11	Shipwreck 15563		January 29, 2026 (#100010330)	Address restricted	Gulf of Mexico	
12	Vernon Basin 2109 (Shipwreck)		January 29, 2026 (#100010334)	Address restricted	Gulf of Mexico	
13	Viosca Knoll (Shipwreck)	Viosca Knoll (Shipwreck)	January 29, 2026 (#100010325)	Address restricted	Gulf of Mexico	

== See also ==
- List of United States National Historic Landmarks in United States commonwealths and territories, associated states, and foreign states
