= Oscar and Christina Beckman Farmstead =

- Beckman, Oscar and Christina, Farmstead
- U.S. National Register of Historic Places
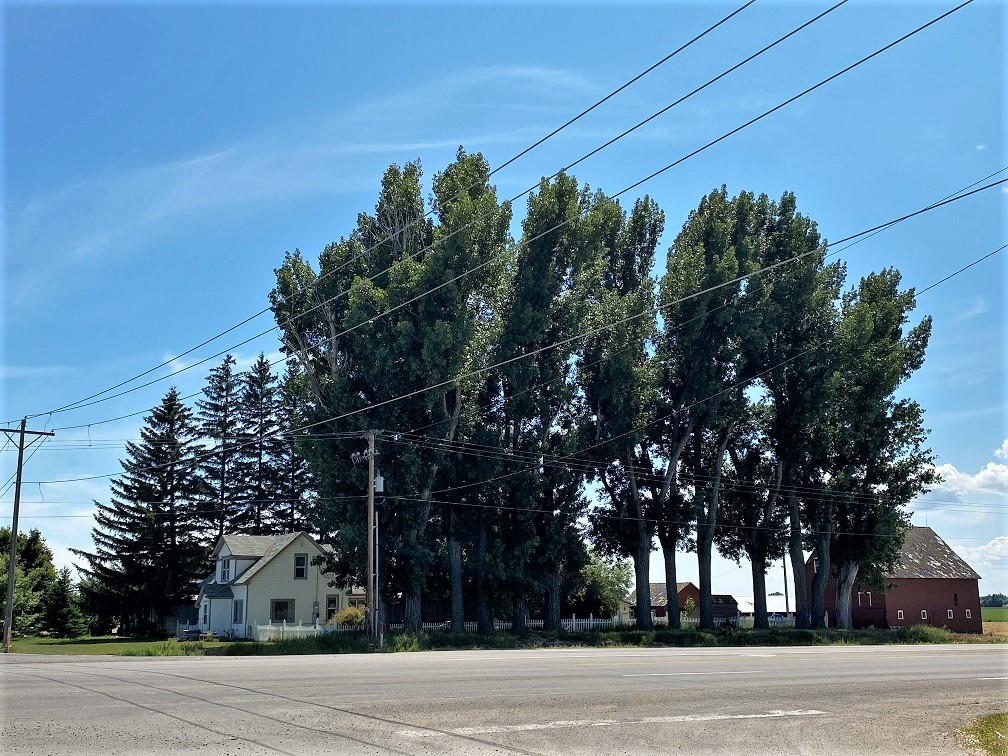
- Farmstead in 2023

- Location within Idaho
- Nearest city: Idaho Falls, Idaho
- Coordinates: 43°29′38″N 112°07′28″W
- Area: 80 acres (32 ha)
- Built: 1896
- Built by: Jacob Severin Adophson, others
- Architectural style: Colonial Revival, Queen Anne
- MPS: New Sweden and Riverview Farmsteads and Institutional Buildings MPS
- NRHP reference No.: 91001713
- Added to NRHP: November 19, 1991

The Oscar and Christina Beckman Farmstead, in Bonneville County, Idaho near Idaho Falls, Idaho, was built in 1896. It was listed on the National Register of Historic Places in 1991. The listing included nine contributing buildings on 80 acres (32 ha).

It includes work by a Swedish-American farmer-carpenter named Jacob Severin Adolphson, who contributed to building the house and some of its outbuildings.

The house is of "double-cell type", with elements of Queen Anne and Colonial Revival styles.

It includes a basilica-plan barn with half-story loft, built in 1914, and a pig shed.

It is located at the southwestern corner of the junction of New Sweden-Shelley Rd. and U.S. Route 20.
