= Palisades Dam =

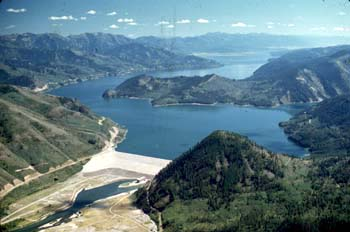
- Aerial view from northwest

- Location in the United States Location in Idaho
- Official name: Palisades Dam
- Country: United States
- Location: Bonneville County, Idaho
- Coordinates: 43°19′59″N 111°12′10″W
- Construction began: 1951
- Opening date: 1957; 69 years ago
- Operator: U.S. Bureau of Reclamation

Dam and spillways
- Impounds: Snake River
- Height: 270 feet (82 m)
- Length: 2,100 feet (640 m)
- Dam volume: 13,571,000 cu yd (10,376,000 m^{3})
- Spillway type: Radial gates to tunnel through left abutment
- Spillway capacity: 48,500 cu ft/s (1,370 m^{3}/s)

Reservoir
- Creates: Palisades Reservoir
- Total capacity: 1,200,000 acre-feet (1.5 km^{3})
- Catchment area: 5,150 sq mi (13,300 km^{2})
- Normal elevation: 5,620 ft (1,713 m)

Power Station
- Hydraulic head: 249 ft (76 m)
- Turbines: 4 x 44.15 MW turbines
- Installed capacity: 176.6 MW
- Annual generation: 906,720,100 KWh (1994)
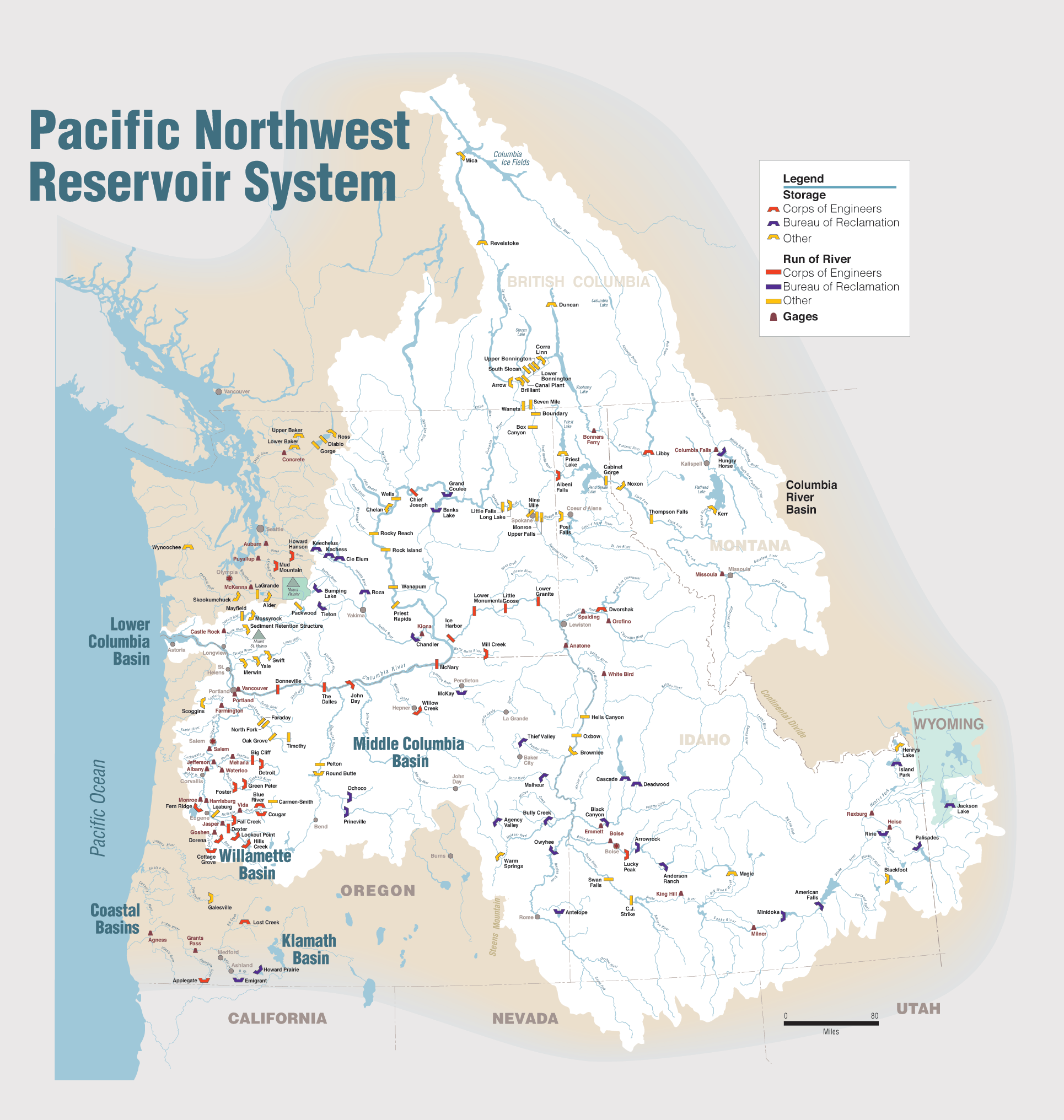
- Columbia River Basin

Palisades Dam (National Inventory of Dams ID ID00273) is an earth-fill dam in the western United States, on the upper Snake River in eastern Idaho. Located in Bonneville County near the Wyoming border, the dam was completed 69 years ago in 1957.

Providing irrigation water, flood control, and recreation, it features a four-turbine hydroelectric power plant and can potentially generate 176.5 MW of electricity. The resulting water impoundment, Palisades Reservoir, has a storage capacity of 1.2 million acre-feet. The dam and power station were listed on the National Register of Historic Places in 2018.

== History ==
The dam was constructed as the principal feature of the U.S. Bureau of Reclamation's Palisades Project. The Palisades Project supplements the storage and power generation facilities of the earlier Minidoka and Michaud Flats projects, which serve irrigation interest in Idaho on the Snake River Plain, saving about 1,350,000 acre-feet (1.67 km^{3}) through the winter for use in the growing season. With 13,571,000 cubic yards of material, the dam was the largest in the USBR system at the time of its construction.

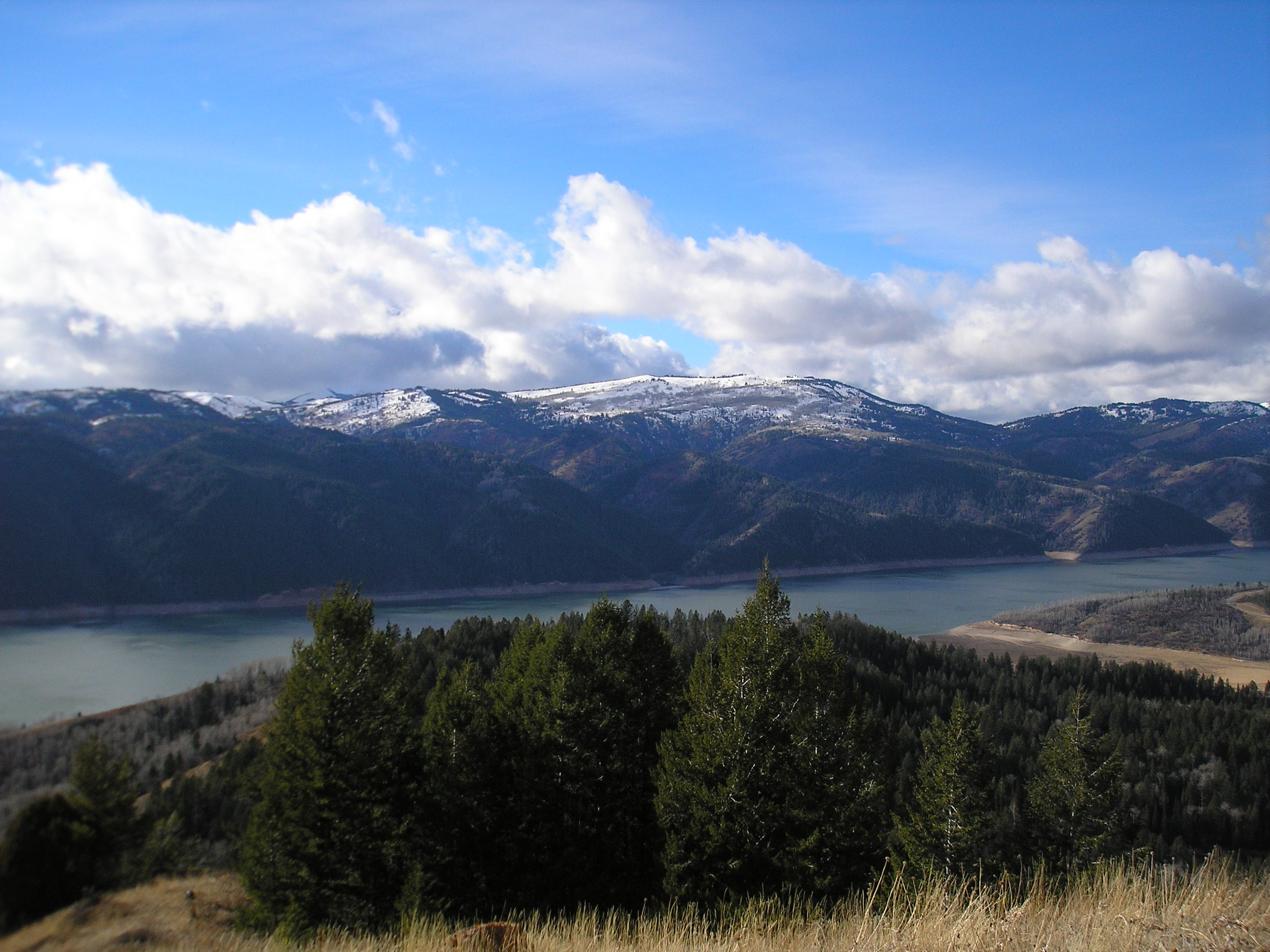
Reservoir's northeast end

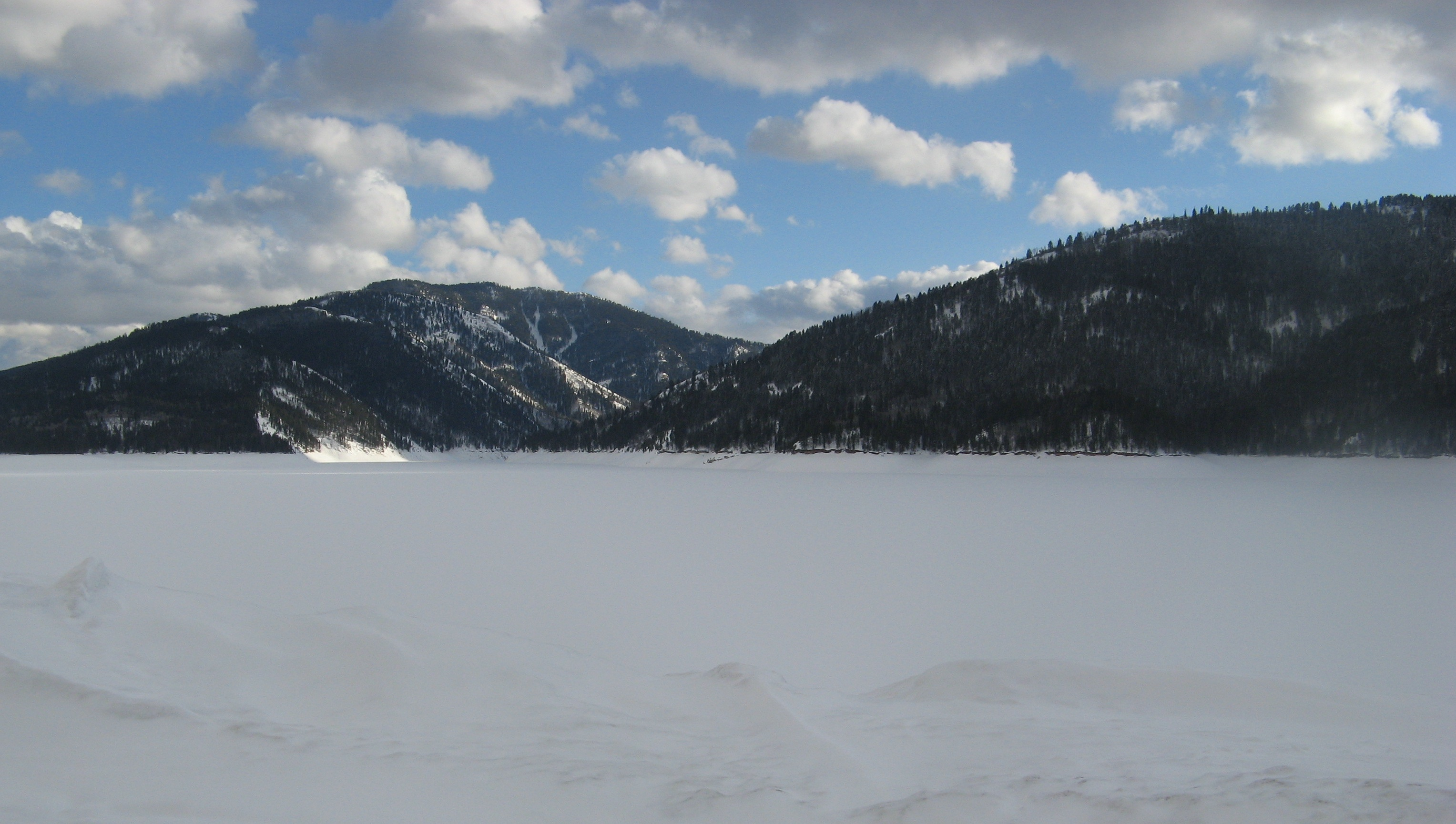
Palisades Reservoir in winter

The Palisades Project was authorized to improve the ability of the Snake River irrigation scheme to deal with drought, and addressed shortcomings in water storage that became evident during the 1930s. Initial evaluation started in 1934. The proposed damsite was chosen at Calamity Point, a narrow place in the Snake River canyon with 1,000 feet (300 m) walls. Initially known as the "Grand Valley Site" the name was changed to avoid confusion with the Grand Valley Project in Colorado. Delayed by World War II, construction finally started in 1951 and was completed in 1957, with the generating plant online the following year. Much of the power is used to pump water in the Minidoka Project. Excess power is sold on the open market. The powerplant was upgraded from a nameplate capacity of 118.75MW to 176.6MW in 1994.

Congress authorized $94,596,000 for multiple-purpose reclamation developments in eastern Idaho when the House and Senate adopted a compromise conference report on the Palisades Dam and Reservoir Project bill, S 2195. President Truman signed the measure on September 30, 1950, and it became Public Law 864. The bill re-authorized at an expenditure not to exceed $76,601,000 the Palisades Dam and Reservoir essentially as it first was approved by Congress in 1941, except that the power installation was increased to 112,500 kilowatts. Power output, it was specified, will be incidental to operation of the reservoir principally for irrigation and flood control.

== See also ==
- List of dams in the Columbia River watershed
