= Douglas-Farr Building =

- U.S. National Register of Historic Places
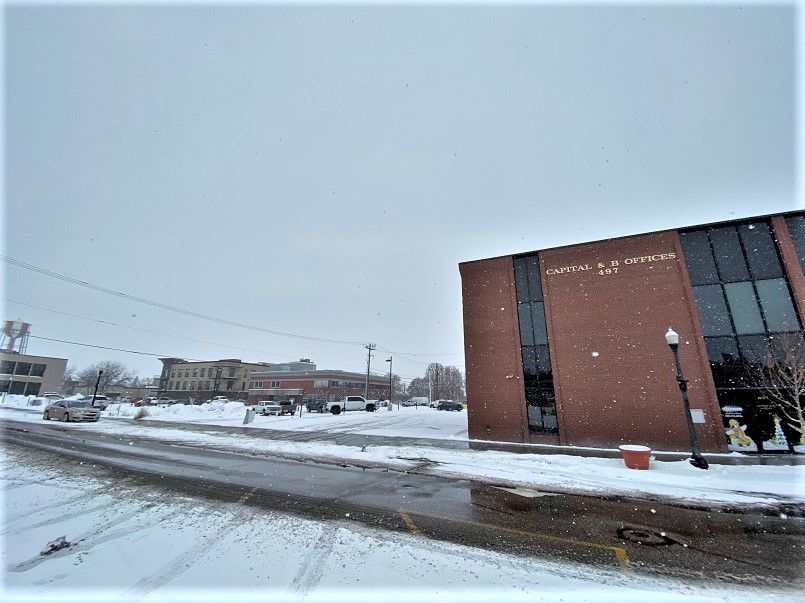
- The Douglas-Farr Building site was to the left of the office building.

- Location within Idaho Location within the United States
- Location: 493 N. Capital Ave., Idaho Falls, Idaho
- Coordinates: 43°29′38″N 112°02′25″W
- Area: 0.2 acres (0.081 ha)
- Built: 1911
- Architectural style: Early Commercial
- MPS: Idaho Falls Downtown MRA
- NRHP reference No.: 84001035
- Added to NRHP: August 30, 1984

The Douglas-Farr Building, at 493 N. Capital Ave. in Idaho Falls, Idaho, was built in 1911. It was listed on the National Register of Historic Places in 1984.

It was a one-story brick Early Commercial-style building. The brick was laid in common bond with a header course every seventh row, and was originally red brick but was later painted a cream color. It had a denticulated cornice formed of brick corbels, above five storefronts.

It was deemed "architecturally significant as the area's only remaining unaltered example of the one-story commercial buildings of the late nineteenth and early twentieth century period. Simple, one-story brick commercial buildings were once common as part of the Idaho Falls downtown streetscape. This building was a late example that draws on the Renaissance Revival for its brick corbelling and its segmentally arched windows. Built between 1911 and 1921, the building first housed Anthony F. Douglas, auto repair shop and the Farr Candy Company. Such industrialuses typically were scattered throughout the downtown areas of Idaho towns during their first decades and gradually became more confined to specific areas. Capital Avenue in Idaho Falls, where the Douglas-Farr Building was located, is one such area. During the 1930s and 1940s, the southern portion of the building was used to publish a regional weekly paper called The Eastern Idaho Farmer. The publisher was Aden Hyde, and his partner was Henry Dworshak, then a U.S. Representative and later a U.S. Senator.
