= Salt River Hydroelectric Powerplant =

- U.S. National Register of Historic Places
- U.S. Historic district
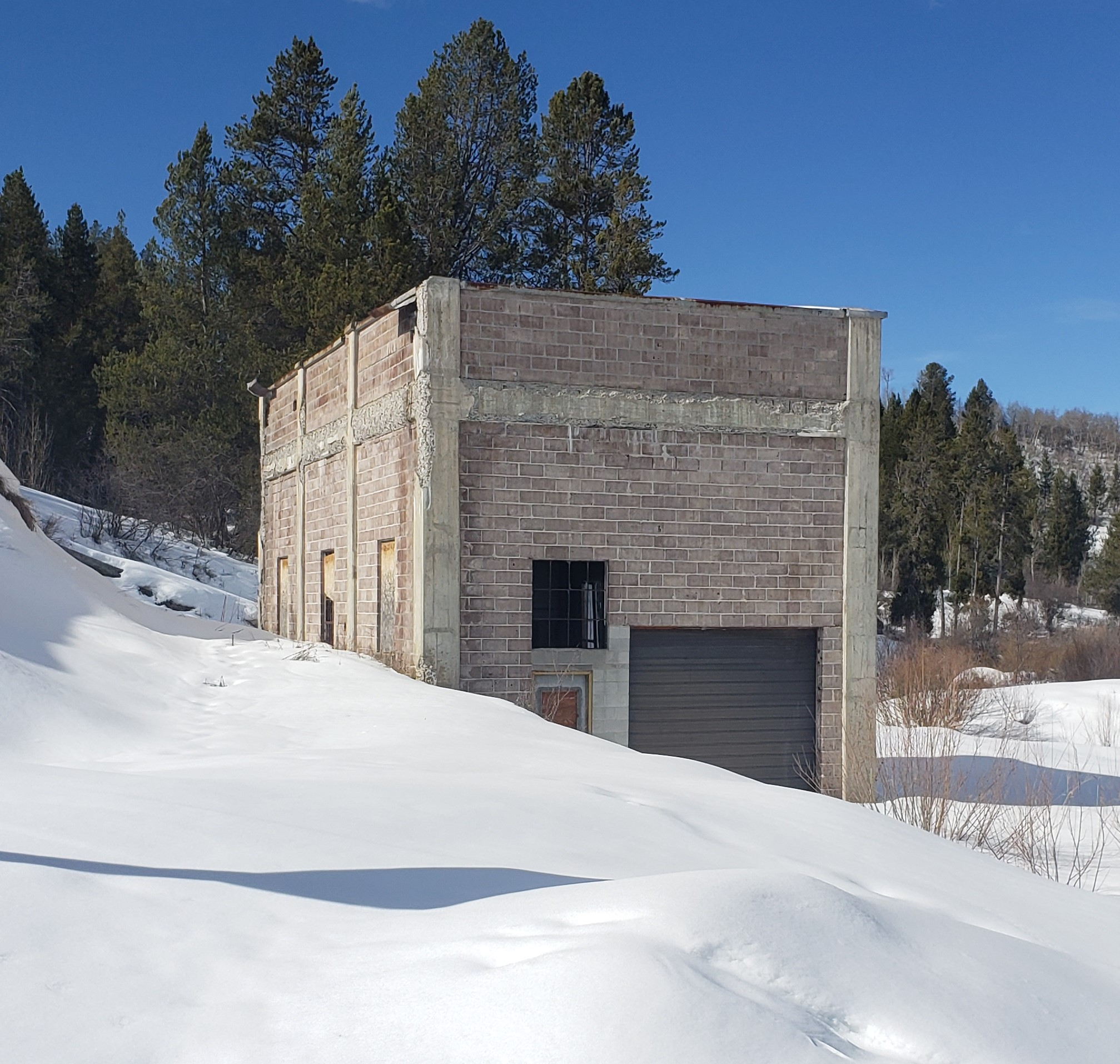

- Location within Idaho Location within the United States
- Nearest city: Etna, Wyoming
- Coordinates: 43.11952°N 111.03527°W
- Area: 36 acres (15 ha)
- Built: 1938
- NRHP reference No.: 93000889
- Added to NRHP: December 2, 1993

Salt River Hydroelectric Powerplant, on the Salt River and on the border of Idaho and Wyoming, near Etna, Wyoming, was built in 1938.

It was listed on the National Register of Historic Places (NRHP) in 1993. The listing included six contributing structures and one contributing building on 36 acres (15 ha).

== History ==
It is significant for its role in development of the Star Valley area of Wyoming. It was funded by the New Deal's Rural Electrification Administration program, which began in 1935. The powerplant operated from 1938 to 1967, serving a wide area; it was made redundant by cheap power from the Bonneville Dam project. The powerplant was in rare good condition for a facility of its era, including all of its power generation machinery, as of the NRHP listing.
