= List of places in Idaho: A–K =

This list of current cities, towns, unincorporated communities, counties, and other recognized places in the U.S. state of Idaho also includes information on the number and names of counties in which the place lies, and its lower and upper ZIP Code bounds, if applicable.

== A ==
Name of place	Number of Counties	Principal county	Lower ZIP Code	Upper ZIP Code
Aberdeen	1	Bingham County	83210
Aberdeen Junction	1	Bingham County
Acequia	1	Minidoka County	83350
Adair	1	Shoshone County
Addie	1	Boundary County
Adelaide	1	Minidoka County
Agatha	1	Nez Perce County
Ahsahka	1	Clearwater County	83520
Aiken	1	Bingham County
Airport	1	Ada County	83715
Alameda	1	Bannock County	83201
Albeni Falls Spur	1	Bonner County
Albion	1	Cassia County	83311
Aldaphe Heights	1	Ada County
Alder Creek	1	Benewah County
Alexander	1	Caribou County
Algoma	1	Bonner County	83860
Allendale	1	Canyon County
Allens Spur	1	Boundary County
Almo	1	Cassia County	83312
Alpha	1	Valley County	83611
Alpine	1	Adams County	83610
Alridge	1	Bingham County
Alton	1	Bear Lake County
Aluma	1	Canyon County
Amalga	1	Minidoka County
American Falls	1	Power County	83211
Ammon	1	Bonneville County	83401
Amsco	1	Canyon County
Amsterdam	1	Twin Falls County
Anderson	1	Franklin County
Anderson Dam	1	Elmore County	83647
Annis	1	Jefferson County	83442
Antelope	1	Bonneville County	83443
Appleton	1	Gooding County	83338
Apple Valley	1	Canyon County	83660
Arbon	1	Power County	83212
Arbon Valley	1	Power County
Archabal	1	Valley County
Archer	1	Madison County	83440
Arco	1	Butte County	83213
Argora	1	Clark County	83423
Arimo	1	Bannock County	83214
Arling	1	Valley County
Arrow	1	Nez Perce County
Artesian City	1	Twin Falls County	83344
Asbestos Point	1	Idaho County
Ashton	1	Fremont County	83420
Athol	1	Kootenai County	83801
Atlanta	1	Elmore County	83601
Atlas	1	Kootenai County
Atomic City	1	Bingham County	83215
Avery	1	Shoshone County	83802
Avon	1	Latah County	83823

== B ==
Name of place	Number of counties	Principal county	Lower ZIP Code	Upper ZIP Code
Bach	1	Bonneville County
Baker	1	Lemhi County	83467
Bancroft	1	Caribou County	83217
Banida	1	Franklin County	83264
Banks	1	Boise County	83602
Bannock	1	Bannock County	83204
Bannock	1	Power County
Barber	1	Ada County
Barite	1	Blaine County
Barlow	1	Jefferson County
Barrymore	1	Jerome County
Barton	1	Washington County
Basalt	1	Bingham County	83218
Basin	1	Cassia County	83346
Bassett	1	Jefferson County
Bates	1	Teton County	83422
Bayhorse	1	Custer County
Bayview	1	Kootenai County	83803
Beachs Corner	1	Bonneville County	83401
Bear	1	Adams County	83612
Bear Lake Hot Springs	1	Bear Lake County
Bear Lake Sands	1	Bear Lake County
Beatty	1	Ada County
Beers	1	Franklin County
Beetville	1	Cassia County
Bellevue	1	Blaine County	83313
Bellgrove	1	Kootenai County
Belmont	1	Kootenai County	83801
Belvidere	1	Valley County
Bench	1	Caribou County	83241
Benewah	1	Benewah County	83861
Bennington	1	Bear Lake County	83254
Berenice	1	Butte County
Berger	1	Twin Falls County
Bern	1	Bear Lake County	83220
Besslen	1	Lincoln County
Bickel	1	Twin Falls County
Big Cedar	1	Idaho County
Big Creek	1	Valley County	83667
Big Eddy	1	Boise County
Big George	1	Nez Perce County
Big Springs	1	Fremont County	83433
Bills	1	Twin Falls County
Black	1	Jerome County
Black Bear	1	Shoshone County	83873
Blackbird Townsite	1	Lemhi County
Black Canyon	1	Gem County
Black Cloud	1	Shoshone County	83873
Blackfoot	1	Bingham County	83221
Black Lake	1	Kootenai County	83861
Black Pine	1	Oneida County
Blackrock	1	Bannock County
Blacks Creek	1	Ada County
Blacktail	1	Bonner County
Blackwell	1	Kootenai County
Blaine	1	Camas County
Blaine	1	Latah County	83843
Blanchard	1	Bonner County	83804
Blaser	1	Bannock County
Bliss	1	Gooding County	83314
Bloomington	1	Bear Lake County	83223
Blue Dome	1	Clark County	83464
Boehls	1	Clearwater County
Boise	1	Ada County	83701	19
Boise Air Terminal	1	Ada County	83705
Boise City	1	Ada County	83701	19
Boise Heights	1	Ada County
Boise Hills Village	1	Ada County
Boise Junction	1	Ada County
Boles	1	Idaho County
Bonanza	1	Custer County	83278
Bone	1	Bonneville County	83401
Bonners Ferry	1	Boundary County	83805
Borah	1	Ada County	83702
Borah	1	Power County
Border	1	Bear Lake County
Boulder	1	Blaine County
Bovard	1	Latah County
Bovill	1	Latah County	83806
Bowmont	1	Canyon County	83686
Box Canyon	1	Fremont County	83429
Bradley	1	Shoshone County	83837
Bramwell	1	Gem County
Bridge	1	Cassia County	83342
Broadford	1	Blaine County	83313
Bronx	1	Bonner County
Broten	1	Bonner County	83864
Brownlee	1	Boise County
Bruce Eddy	1	Clearwater County
Bruneau	1	Owyhee County	83604
Bruneau Valley	1	Owyhee County	83604
Buckingham	1	Payette County
Budge	1	Minidoka County
Buhl	1	Twin Falls County	83316
Buist	1	Oneida County	83243
Bundy	1	Nez Perce County
Bunn	1	Shoshone County
Burgdorf	1	Idaho County	83638
Burke	1	Shoshone County	83807
Burley	2	Cassia County	83318
Burley	2	Minidoka County	83318
Burmah	1	Lincoln County	83349
Burns	1	Boundary County
Burton	1	Madison County	83440
Butler Bay	1	Benewah County	83861
Butte City	1	Butte County	83213
Byrne	1	Madison County

== C ==
Name of place	Number of counties	Principal county	Lower ZIP Code	Upper ZIP Code
Cabarton	1	Valley County
Cabinet	1	Bonner County	83811
Cache	1	Teton County
Calder	1	Shoshone County	83808
Caldwell	1	Canyon County	83605
Caldwell Labor Camp	1	Canyon County	83605
Calendar	1	Idaho County
Camas	1	Jefferson County
Cambridge	1	Washington County	83610
Cameron	1	Nez Perce County	83537
Canyon Creek	1	Madison County	83436
Carbonate	1	Shoshone County
Carbon Center	1	Shoshone County
Cardiff	1	Clearwater County	83546
Cardiff Mill	1	Clearwater County
Cardwell	1	Benewah County
Carey	1	Blaine County	83320
Careywood	1	Bonner County	83809
Caribel	1	Idaho County
Caribou City	1	Bonneville County
Carlin Bay	1	Kootenai County	83833
Carmen	1	Lemhi County	83462
Carrietown	1	Camas County
Cascade	1	Valley County	83611
Castleford	1	Twin Falls County	83321
Castle Rocks	1	Elmore County
Casto	1	Custer County
Cataldo	1	Kootenai County	83810
Cathedral Pines	1	Blaine County
Cavendish	1	Clearwater County	83541
Cedar Canyon	1	Clearwater County
Cedar Creek	1	Bonner County
Cedarhill	1	Oneida County
Cedron	1	Teton County
Centerville	1	Boise County	83631
Central	1	Caribou County	83241
Central Cove	1	Canyon County
Cerro Grande	1	Bingham County
Chalk Cut	1	Elmore County
Challis	1	Custer County	83226
Chapin	1	Teton County
Chatcolet	1	Benewah County	83851
Chausse	1	Bear Lake County
Cherry Creek	1	Oneida County	83252
Cherry Lane	1	Ada County
Cherrylane	1	Nez Perce County
Cherryville	1	Franklin County
Chesley	1	Nez Perce County
Chester	1	Fremont County	83421
Chesterfield	1	Caribou County	83217
Chilco	1	Kootenai County	83801
Chilly	1	Custer County	83251
China Hat	1	Owyhee County
China Hill	1	Caribou County
Chubbuck	1	Bannock County	83202
Churchill	1	Cassia County	83346
Clagstone	1	Bonner County	83856
Clarendon Hot Springs	1	Blaine County
Clark Fork	1	Bonner County	83811
Clarkia	1	Shoshone County	83812
Clarkson	1	Bingham County
Clarksville	1	Kootenai County	83835
Clark Tree	1	Idaho County
Clawson	1	Teton County	83452
Clayton	1	Custer County	83227
Claytonia	1	Owyhee County
Clearwater	1	Idaho County	83539
Cleft	1	Elmore County
Clementsville	1	Teton County	83436
Cleveland	1	Franklin County	83283
Clicks	1	Lewis County
Cliff	1	Custer County
Cliffs	1	Owyhee County	97910
Clifton	1	Franklin County	83228
Clover	1	Twin Falls County	83316
Cloverdale	1	Ada County
Clyde	1	Butte County	83244
Cobalt	1	Lemhi County	83229
Cobb	1	Washington County
Cocolalla	1	Bonner County	83813
Coeur d'Alene	1	Kootenai County	83814
Coeur d'Alene Indian Reservation	2	Benewah County	83540
Coeur d'Alene Indian Reservation	2	Kootenai County	83540
Coeur d'Alene Junction	1	Kootenai County
Coffee Point	1	Bingham County
Colalla	1	Bonner County
Colburn	1	Bonner County	83865
Colby	1	Bonner County
Coleman	1	Bonner County
Cole Village	1	Ada County	83704
Collier Place	1	Owyhee County
Collins	1	Bingham County
Collister	1	Ada County	83703
Coltman	1	Bonneville County	83401
Columbus Park	1	Ada County
Comical Turn	1	Owyhee County
Concord	1	Idaho County
Concrete	1	Washington County
Conda	1	Caribou County	83230
Conkling Park	1	Kootenai County	83876
Connor	1	Cassia County	83342
Coolin	1	Bonner County	83821
Copeland	1	Boundary County	83805
Copperville	1	Idaho County	83554
Cora	1	Latah County
Cornell	1	Latah County
Cornwall	1	Latah County	83843
Corral	1	Camas County	83322
Cotterel	1	Cassia County	83323
Cotton	1	Bonneville County
Cottonwood	1	Idaho County	83522
Cottonwood	1	Owyhee County
Coulam	1	Franklin County
Council	1	Adams County	83612
Country Club Manor	1	Ada County
Country Club Terrace	1	Ada County
Cow Creek	1	Clearwater County
Cox	1	Bingham County
Craig Junction	1	Lewis County
Craigmont	1	Lewis County	83523
Craters of The Moon National Monument	2	Blaine County	83213
Craters of The Moon National Monument	2	Butte County	83213
Cream Can Junction	1	Blaine County
Crescent	1	Latah County	83550
Crippen	1	Cassia County
Crossport	1	Boundary County
Cross Trails	1	Idaho County
Crouch	1	Boise County	83622
Crystal	1	Power County
Crystal	1	Washington County	83672
Culdesac	1	Nez Perce County	83524
Culver	1	Bonner County	83864
Cuprum	1	Adams County	83612
Curry	1	Twin Falls County	83328
Custer	1	Custer County

== D ==
Name of place	Number of counties	Principal county	Lower ZIP Code	Upper ZIP Code
Dairy Creek	1	Oneida County
Dalton Gardens	1	Kootenai County	83814
Daniels	1	Oneida County	83252
Darby	1	Teton County
Darlington	1	Butte County	83231
Davidson	1	Idaho County
Davis Acres	1	Ada County	83704
Dayton	1	Franklin County	83232
Deal	1	Canyon County
Deary	1	Latah County	83823
Declo	1	Cassia County	83323
Deep Creek	1	Boundary County
Deep Creek	1	Twin Falls County	83316
Deer Creek	1	Clearwater County
Dehlin	1	Bonneville County
De Lamar	1	Owyhee County
Del Monte	1	Gem County
Delta	1	Shoshone County	83873
Democrat	1	Owyhee County
Dent	1	Clearwater County
Denton	1	Ada County
Denver	1	Idaho County
De Smet	1	Benewah County	83824
Devils Ladder	1	Adams County
Dew Drop Place	1	Owyhee County
Dewey	1	Owyhee County
DeWoff	1	Blaine County
Diamond	1	Washington County
Dickensheet Junction	1	Bonner County
Dickey	1	Custer County
Dickshooter	1	Owyhee County
Dietrich	1	Lincoln County	83324
Dingle	1	Bear Lake County
Dingle	1	Bear Lake County	83233
Dixie	1	Elmore County
Dixie	1	Idaho County	83525
Doles	1	Canyon County	83605
Don	1	Power County
Doniphan	1	Blaine County
Donnelly	1	Valley County	83615
Dorsey	1	Shoshone County
Dover	1	Bonner County	83825
Downata Hot Springs	1	Bannock County
Downey	1	Bannock County	83234
Driggs	1	Teton County	83422
Drummond	1	Fremont County	83420
Dryden	1	Idaho County
Dry Forty	1	Owyhee County
Dry Valley	1	Caribou County
Dubois	1	Clark County	83423
Duck Valley Indian Reservation	1	Owyhee County	89832
Dudley	1	Kootenai County
Dufort	1	Bonner County
Dwight	1	Teton County	83452
Dysonasia	1	McGee County

== E ==
Name of place	Number of counties	Principal county	Lower ZIP Code	Upper ZIP Code
Eagle	1	Ada County	83616
Eagle Nest	1	Valley County
Eagle Rock	1	Bonneville County	83402
Easley Hot Springs	1	Blaine County
East Greenacres	1	Kootenai County
East Hope	1	Bonner County	83836
East Kamiah	1	Idaho County
East Lewiston	1	Nez Perce County	83501
Eastport	1	Boundary County	83826
Eastside	1	Ada County	83706
Eaton	1	Washington County	83672
Eccles	1	Fremont County
Echo Beach	1	Kootenai County	83858
Eddiville	1	Kootenai County	83814
Eddyville	1	Kootenai County
Eden	1	Jerome County	83325
Edgemere	1	Bonner County	83856
Edmonds	1	Madison County	83440
Edwardsburg	1	Valley County
Egin	1	Fremont County	83445
Egypt	1	Franklin County
Eiffie	1	Payette County
Eighteenmile	1	Clark County
Eileen	1	Boundary County
Elba	1	Cassia County	83326
Elcock	1	Cassia County
Elk City	1	Idaho County	83525
Elkhorn	1	Shoshone County
Elk River	1	Clearwater County	83827
Elk Summit	1	Idaho County
Ellis	1	Custer County	83235
Elmira	1	Bonner County	83862
Emerald Creek	1	Shoshone County
Emida	1	Benewah County	83861
Emmett	1	Gem County	83617
Enaville	1	Shoshone County	83839
Enrose	1	Canyon County	83605
Epco	1	Caribou County
Era	1	Butte County
Erlmo	1	Shoshone County
Estes	1	Latah County
Ethelton	1	Shoshone County
Evans	1	Cassia County
Evergreen	1	Adams County
Excelsior Beach	1	Kootenai County	83858

== F ==
Name of place	Number of counties	Principal county	Lower ZIP Code	Upper ZIP Code
Fairfield	1	Camas County	83327
Fairgrounds	1	Ada County
Fairview	1	Franklin County	83263
Fairview	1	Power County
Fairview	1	Twin Falls County	83316
Fairylawn	1	Owyhee County
Falcon	1	Shoshone County
Fall Creek	1	Idaho County	83530
Falls City	1	Jerome County	83338
Fanning Field	1	Bonneville County	83401
Fansler Spur	1	Bonner County
Featherville	1	Elmore County	83647
Feely Spur	1	Kootenai County
Felt	1	Teton County	83424
Feltham	1	Washington County
Fenn	1	Idaho County	83531
Ferdinand	1	Idaho County	83526
Ferguson	1	Shoshone County
Fernan Lake Village	1	Kootenai County	83814
Fernwood	1	Benewah County	83830
Filer	1	Twin Falls County	83328
Fingal	1	Bingham County
Firth	1	Bingham County	83236
Fischer	1	Canyon County
Fish Haven	1	Bear Lake County	83287
Five Corners	1	Clearwater County
Flat Creek	1	Benewah County
Fletcher	1	Lewis County
Flint	1	Owyhee County
Florence	1	Idaho County
Forebay	1	Nez Perce County
Forest	1	Lewis County
Forest Siding	1	Bonner County
Forney	1	Lemhi County
Fort Hall	2	Bannock County	83203
Fort Hall	2	Bingham County	83203
Fort Hall Indian Reservation	4	Bannock County	83203
Fort Hall Indian Reservation	4	Bingham County	83203
Fort Hall Indian Reservation	4	Caribou County	83203
Fort Hall Indian Reservation	4	Power County	83203
Fort Wilson	1	Payette County
Four Corners	1	Bonner County
Four Corners	1	Owyhee County
Fourway Junction	1	Idaho County
Fox Creek	1	Teton County	83455
France	1	Fremont County
Franklin	1	Ada County
Franklin	1	Franklin County	83237
Franklin Park, Idaho	1	Ada County
Fraser	1	Clearwater County
Freedom	1	Caribou County
French Creek	1	Idaho County
Frisco	1	Shoshone County	83873
Fritser Ford	1	Valley County
Fruitland	1	Payette County	83619
Fruitvale	1	Adams County	83620
Fuller	1	Gooding County
Fullmer	1	Bingham County

== G ==
Name of place	Number of counties	Principal county	Lower ZIP Code	Upper ZIP Code
Gale	1	Madison County
Galena	1	Blaine County
Gannett	1	Blaine County	83313
Gardena	1	Boise County	83629
Garden City	1	Ada County	83714
Garden Valley	1	Boise County	83622
Garfield	1	Jefferson County	83401
Garrard Ranch	1	Cassia County
Garwood	1	Kootenai County	83835
Gay	1	Bingham County
Gem	1	Shoshone County	83873
Genesee	1	Latah County	83832
Geneva	1	Bear Lake County	83238
Gentry	1	Shoshone County
Georgetown	1	Bear Lake County	83239
Georgetown	1	Bear Lake County
German Settlement	1	Nez Perce County
Gerrard	1	Bonneville County
Gerrit	1	Fremont County
Gibbonsville	1	Lemhi County	83463
Gibbs	1	Kootenai County
Gibson	1	Bingham County	83203
Gibson City	1	Shoshone County	83850
Gifford	1	Nez Perce County	83541
Gilmore	1	Lemhi County
Gimlet	1	Blaine County
Givens Hot Springs	1	Owyhee County
Glencoe	1	Bear Lake County	83261
Glendale	1	Adams County
Glendale	1	Franklin County	83263
Glengary	1	Bonner County	83864
Glenns Ferry	1	Elmore County	83623
Glenwood	1	Clearwater County	83544
Glenwood	1	Idaho County	83536
Godwin	1	Twin Falls County
Golconda	1	Shoshone County
Golconda Mill	1	Shoshone County
Goldburg	1	Custer County
Gold Creek	1	Shoshone County
Golden	1	Idaho County	83530
Gold Point	1	Idaho County
Good Grief	1	Boundary County
Gooding	1	Gooding County	83330
Goodrich	1	Adams County	83612
Goshen	1	Bingham County	83274
Goshen Junction	1	Bingham County
Grace	1	Caribou County	83241
Graham	1	Boise County
Grainville	1	Fremont County
Grandjean	1	Boise County	83637
Grand Junction	1	Kootenai County
Grandview	1	Bingham County
Grand View	1	Owyhee County	83624
Grangemont	1	Clearwater County	83544
Grangeville	1	Idaho County	83530
Granite	1	Bonner County	83801
Grant	1	Jefferson County	83401
Grasmere	1	Owyhee County	83604
Gray	1	Bonneville County	83285
Greencreek	1	Idaho County	83533
Greenleaf	1	Canyon County	83626
Greenwood	1	Jerome County	83335
Greer	1	Clearwater County	83544
Grimes Pass	1	Boise County
Gross	1	Gem County	83657
Grouse	1	Custer County	83255
Groveland	1	Bingham County	83221
Guyaz	1	Bonneville County
Gwenford	1	Oneida County	83252

== H ==
Name of place	Number of counties	Principal county	Lower ZIP Code	Upper ZIP Code
Hackman	1	Bonneville County
Hagerman	1	Gooding County	83332
Hahn	1	Lemhi County
Hailey	1	Blaine County	83333
Haley	1	Clearwater County
Hamer	1	Jefferson County	83425
Hamilton Corner	1	Payette County	83655
Hammett	1	Elmore County	83627
Hampton	1	Latah County	83857
Hansen	1	Twin Falls County	83334
Hardscrabble Campground	1	Boise County
Harer	1	Bear Lake County
Harlem	1	Bonner County
Harpster	1	Idaho County	83539
Harrisburg	1	Idaho County
Harrison	1	Kootenai County	83833
Harris Siding	1	Lewis County
Hart	1	Madison County
Harvard	1	Latah County	83834
Hatch	1	Caribou County
Hatwai	1	Nez Perce County	83501
Hauser	1	Kootenai County	83854
Havens	1	Bingham County
Hawgood	1	Jefferson County
Hawkins	1	Bannock County	83214
Hawley	1	Blaine County
Hay	1	Blaine County
Haycroft Spur	1	Kootenai County
Haycrop	1	Kootenai County
Hayden	1	Kootenai County	83835
Hayden Lake	1	Kootenai County	83835
Hayden Lake	1	Kootenai County	83835
Haytown	1	Jerome County
Hazelton	1	Jerome County	83335
Headquarters	1	Clearwater County	83534
Heglar	1	Cassia County	83211
Heise	1	Jefferson County	83443
Helena	1	Adams County
Helmer	1	Latah County	83823
Heman	1	Fremont County	83445
Henry	1	Caribou County	83230
Herbert	1	Madison County
Herman	1	Bonneville County
Herrick	1	Shoshone County
Heyburn	1	Minidoka County	83336
Hibbard	1	Madison County	83440
Highlands	1	Ada County
Hill City	1	Camas County	83337
Hillcrest	1	Ada County
Hillview	1	Bonneville County	83401
Hinckley	1	Madison County
Hobson	1	Cassia County
Holbrook	1	Oneida County	83243
Holbrook Summit	1	Oneida County
Hollister	1	Twin Falls County	83301
Hollywood	1	Clearwater County
Homedale	1	Owyhee County	83628
Honeysuckle Hills	1	Kootenai County	83835
Hoover	1	Adams County
Hope	1	Bonner County	83836
Hornet	1	Adams County	83612
Horsecamp	1	Shoshone County
Horseshoe Bend	1	Boise County	83629
Hot Spring Landing	1	Blaine County	83333
Hot Springs	1	Owyhee County
Houston	1	Custer County
Howe	1	Butte County	83244
Howell	1	Latah County
Howelltown	1	Kootenai County
Hoyt	1	Shoshone County
Huetter	1	Kootenai County	83814
Humphrey	1	Clark County	83446
Hunt	1	Jerome County	83335
Huston	1	Canyon County	83630
Hydra	1	Jerome County
Hynes	1	Minidoka County

== I ==
Name of place	Number of counties	Principal county	Lower ZIP Code	Upper ZIP Code
Idaho City	1	Boise County	83631
Idaho Falls	1	Bonneville County	83401	06
Idahome	1	Cassia County	83323
Idavada	1	Twin Falls County
Idmon	1	Clark County	83423
Indian	1	Bonneville County
Indian Cove	1	Owyhee County	83627
Indian Grove	1	Cassia County
Indian Head Rock	1	Camas County
Indian Valley	1	Adams County	83632
Ingard	1	Payette County
Inkom	1	Bannock County	83245
Iona	1	Bonneville County	83427
Ireland Springs	1	Oneida County
Irwin	1	Bonneville County	83428
Island Park	1	Fremont County	83429
Iversons	1	Cassia County

== J ==
Name of place	Number of counties	Principal county	Lower ZIP Code	Upper ZIP Code
Jackson	1	Cassia County	83350
Jacques	1	Nez Perce County	83524
Jamestown	1	Bingham County	83274
Jaype	1	Clearwater County
Jenkins Will	1	Fremont County
Jenness	1	Gem County
Jensen	1	Madison County
Jerome	1	Jerome County	83338
Jersey	1	Clearwater County
Jims Spur	1	Benewah County
Joel	1	Latah County	83843
Johnsons Mill	1	Clearwater County
Jolley	1	Madison County
Jonathan	1	Washington County	83672
Jordan	1	Clearwater County
Joseph	1	Idaho County
Josephson	1	Canyon County
Judge Town	1	Clearwater County	83546
Judkins	1	Teton County
Juliaetta	1	Latah County	83535
Juniper	1	Oneida County	83243

== K ==
Name of place	Number of counties	Principal county	Lower ZIP Code	Upper ZIP Code
Kameron	1	Clearwater County
Kamiah	2	Idaho County	83536
Kamiah	2	Lewis County	83536
Karcher Junction	1	Canyon County
Katka	1	Boundary County
Keeler	1	Shoshone County
Keenan City	1	Bonneville County
Kellogg	1	Shoshone County	83837
Kellogg-Wardner	1	Shoshone County
Kendrick	1	Latah County	83537
Kennedy Ford	1	Latah County
Kenyon	1	Cassia County
Keogh	1	Cassia County
Ketchum	1	Blaine County	83340
Keuterville	1	Idaho County	83538
Kidder	1	Idaho County	83539
Kilgore	1	Clark County	83423
Kimama	1	Lincoln County
Kimball	1	Bingham County	83236
Kimberly	1	Twin Falls County	83341
King	1	Gooding County
King Hill	1	Elmore County	83633
Kings Corner	1	Canyon County
Kingston	1	Shoshone County	83839
Kinport	1	Caribou County
Kippen	1	Lewis County
Knowlton Heights	1	Canyon County	83605
Knull	1	Twin Falls County
Konkolville	1	Clearwater County
Kooskia	1	Idaho County	83539
Kootenai	1	Bonner County	83840
Kootenai Indian Reservation	1	Boundary County	83805
Kuna	1	Ada County	83634
Kyle	1	Shoshone County

== See also ==
- List of places in Idaho: L–Z
