= Glendale =

Glendale may refer to:

== Places ==
=== Australia ===
- Glendale, New South Wales
  - Stockland Glendale, a shopping centre
- Glendale, Queensland, a locality in the Shire of Livingstone

=== Canada ===
- Glendale, Calgary, Alberta, a neighbourhood
- Glendale, Nova Scotia
- Glendale Secondary School, a highschool in Hamilton, Ontario

=== New Zealand ===
- Glendale, New Zealand, a suburb of Wainuiomata, Lower Hutt

=== United Kingdom ===
- Glendale, Northumberland, England, a valley
- Glendale, Skye, Scotland
- Glendale, a neighbourhood of Robroyston, Glasgow, Scotland

=== United States ===
- Glendale, Arizona, largest city with this name
- Glendale, California, a city in Los Angeles County
  - Glendale University College of Law in Glendale, California
  - Glendale Boulevard
  - Glendale Freeway
- Glendale, Humboldt County, California
- Glendale, Colorado, in Arapahoe County
- Glendale, Boulder County, Colorado
- Glendale, Idaho
- Glendale Heights, Illinois
- Glendale, Illinois
- Glendale, Daviess County, Indiana
- Glendale, Indianapolis, Indiana
- Glendale, Kansas
- Glendale, Kentucky
- Glendale, Massachusetts
- Glendale, Missouri
- Glendale, Nevada
  - Glendale Avenue
- Glendale, New Hampshire
- Glendale, Camden County, New Jersey
- Glendale, Mercer County, New Jersey
- Glendale, Queens, New York
- Glendale Township, Logan County, North Dakota
- Glendale, Ohio
- Glendale, Oklahoma
- Glendale, Oregon
  - Glendale University, an unaccredited online school (not affiliated with the Glendale University College of Law)
- Glendale, Rhode Island
- Glendale, Utah, a town in Kane County
- Glendale, Salt Lake City, Utah, a neighborhood
- Glendale, Washington, a community on Whidbey Island
- Glendale, Wisconsin, a city in Milwaukee County
- Glendale, Monroe County, Wisconsin, a town
- Glendale (community), Monroe County, Wisconsin, an unincorporated community

== Other uses ==
- Battle of Glendale, a battle of the American Civil War in Henrico County, Virginia
- A character in the animated streaming television series Centaurworld

== See also ==
- Glendale High School (disambiguation)
- Glen Dale (disambiguation)
- Glenn Dale (disambiguation)
- Glenndale (disambiguation)
