= Idaho State Highway 39 =

State highway in Idaho, United States

State Highway 39
- SH-39 highlighted in red

Route information
- Maintained by ITD
- Length: 52.924 mi (85.173 km)
- Existed: 1929–present

Major junctions
- South end: I-86 / US 30 northeast of American Falls
- I-86 BL in American Falls
- North end: US 26 in Collins (west of Blackfoot)

Location
- Country: United States
- State: Idaho

Highway system
- Idaho State Highway System; Interstate; US; State
← SH-38	→ SH-40

State Highway 39 (SH-39) is a 52.924-mile (85.173 km) state highway in Power and Bingham counties in Idaho, United States, that connects Interstate 86/U.S. Route 30 (I-86/US 30), northwest of American Falls with U.S. Route 26 (US 26) in Collins (immediately west of Blackfoot).

== Route description ==
=== Power County ===
SH-39 begins at a diamond interchange with I-86/US 30 (exit 40) northeast of American Falls. (I-86/US 30 heads east toward Pocatello, Idaho Falls, and Salt Lake City [in Utah] and west toward Raft River, Burley, and Twin Falls. The road continues east along the former routing of US 30 as Lakeview Road/Old Highway 30/Frontage Road toward another interchange with I-86/US 30.)

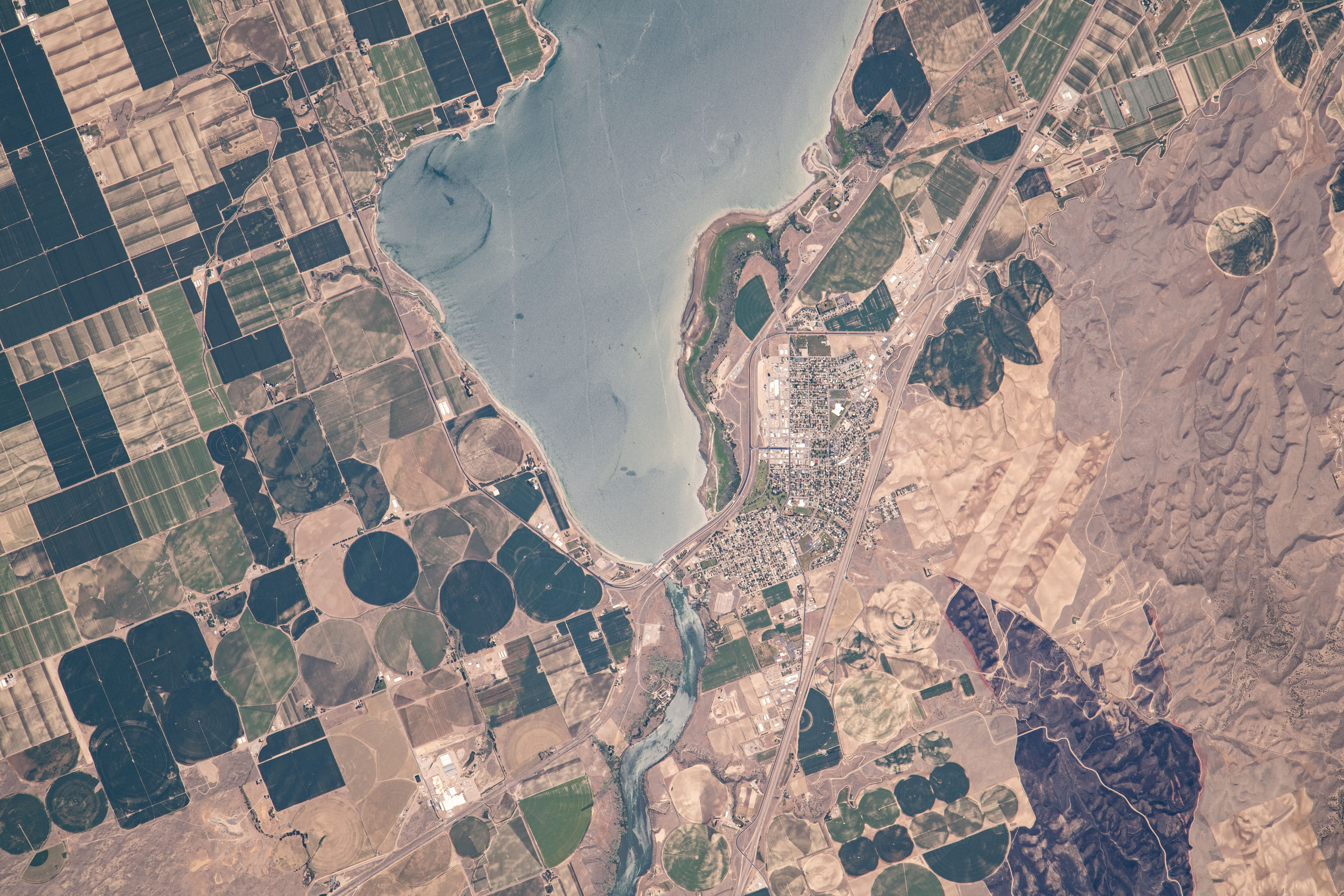
Satellite view of the southern end of SH-39, as it passed along the northern edge of American Falls and wraps about the southern end of the American Falls Reservoir, June 2021

From its southern terminus SH-39 heads westerly as a three-lane road (with a center left-turn lane) concurrently with Interstate 86 Business (I-86 BL) along Pocatello Avenue as it immediately passes by the southwestern edge of the American Falls Airport. SH-39/I-86 BL then turns slightly north, with Pocatello Avenue (Old Highway 30) continuing straight to enter American Falls. Continuing west–northwest as a two-lane road SH-39/I-86 BL passes briefly north of the city limits before entering the city and promptly crossing Hillcrest Avenue.

After crossing Fort Hall Avenue at its next intersection SH-39/I-86 BL briefly leaves the city limits and curves along an overpass (over four sets of railroad tracks owned by the Union Pacific Railroad [UP]) to head south–southwest and then re-enter the city limits to run along the northern edge of the city, parallel with the railroad tracks, and near the south shore of American Falls Reservoir. SH-39/I-86 BL's next intersection is a T intersection with the west end of Idaho Street. (From that intersection, I-86 BL heads briefly southeast along Idaho Street before turning south–southwesterly along Fort Hall Avenue toward it western junction with I-86/US 30.)

From the western end of its concurrency with I-86 BL at Idaho Street, SH-39 widens to four lanes and curves to a nearly westerly heading and becomes a divided highway as it finally leaves the city limits of American Falls as it wraps about the southwestern edge of the American Falls Reservoir, begins running along the Aberdeen Highway, and crosses the Snake River on the American Falls Dam. SH-39 then narrows back to a two-lane road as it curves to head north along the southwestern edge of the reservoir in agricultural land. Briefly heading northeast, SH-39 passes northwest of the unincorporated community of Fairview. Directly north of Fairview, and little under 10 miles (16 km) from its southern terminus, SH-39 leaves Power County and enters Bingham County.

=== Bingham County ===
After crossing the county line, SH-39 continues briefly northeast as the Aberdeen Highway before turning north. Five and a half miles (8.9 km) north of the county line, SH-39 reaches the city of Aberdeen. Immediately south of the city, SH-39 turns to head east along West 1800 South for about 7 blocks as it enters the city limits. SH-39 then turns north along South Main Street. After passing through Aberdeen as a five-lane road, SH-39 narrows back to a two-lane road, curves to head northwest, and leaves the city limits. Upon reaching South 2700 West, SH-39 turns to head north along that road for roughly 3 miles (4.8 km), passing west of the unincorporated community of Fingal along the way. SH-39 then jogs northeast before continuing north along South 2600 West for about 5 miles (8.0 km), passing west of the unincorporated community of Grandview along the way. (Originally, and until at least 1978, SH-39 turned east to run along West 1000 South through Grandview before turning north along South 2400 West [Anderson Road].)

About 10 miles (16 km) north of Aberdeen, SH-39 turns to head east along West 800 South (Springfield Road). Approximately 6.5 miles (10.5 km) after turning east, SH-39 passes through the unincorporated community of Springfield. About 3 miles (4.8 km) east of Springfield, SH-39 turns to head north–northeast for just over 9 miles (14 km), running east of, but parallel to a set of UP tracks, passing through the unincorporated communities of Pingree and Liberty and the census-designated place (CDP) of Rockland along the way. Just north of Rockland, SH-39 turns to head east again and passes north of Thomas. After heading east for about 4.7 miles (7.6 km) SH-39 passes through the CDP of Riverside. Roughly 2.5 miles (4.0 km) east of Riverside, SH-39 has a slight jog to the north before reaching the unincorporated community of Collins. (In the area of Collins, SH-39 very briefly passes through the far west city limits of Blackfoot before returning to Collins.) SH-39 then turns northeast and promptly reaches its northern terminus at a T intersection with US 26, near the Snake River and the western edge of Blackfoot. (US 26 heads east into Blackfoot and on toward Idaho Falls, Dubois, and Butte, Montana. US 26 heads west toward Arco, the Craters of the Moon National Monument and Preserve, and Boise.)

== History ==
SH-39 was established in 1929.

== Major intersections ==
County	Location	mi	km	Destinations	Notes
Power		0.000	0.000	I-86 / US 30 – Pocatello, Idaho Falls, Twin Falls	Southern terminus; interchange; southern end of I-86 BL concurrency; continues as Lakevew Road
Power	American Falls	1.720	2.768	I-86 BL west (Idaho Street) – I-86/US 30	Northern end of I-86 BL concurrency
Snake River		2.698– 2.804	4.342– 4.513	American Falls Dam	
Bingham	Collins	52.924	85.173	US 26 – Arco, Blackfoot, Idaho Falls	Northern terminus
1.000 mi = 1.609 km; 1.000 km = 0.621 mi: Concurrency terminus

== See also ==
- List of state highways in Idaho
