= Silver Creek Hot Spring =

Thermal spring

- Silver Creek Plunge
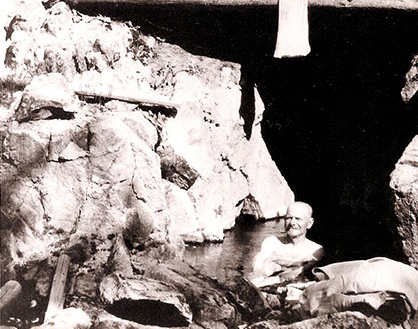
- E.H. Heller in Silver Creek Hot Spring, 1926

- Location within Idaho
- Interactive map of Silver Creek Hot Spring
- Location: Garden Valley, Idaho
- Coordinates: 44°19′48″N 115°48′07″W
- Elevation: 4,490
- Type: geothermal
- Discharge: 540 gallons per minute
- Temperature: 102 °F (39 °C)

Silver Creek Hot Spring is a geothermal mineral spring in Valley County, Idaho. It is located 23 miles North of the town of Crouch. The hot spring is also known as the Silver Creek Plunge. The spring flows into Silver Creek, and on to Middle Fork, a tributary of the Payette River.

== History ==
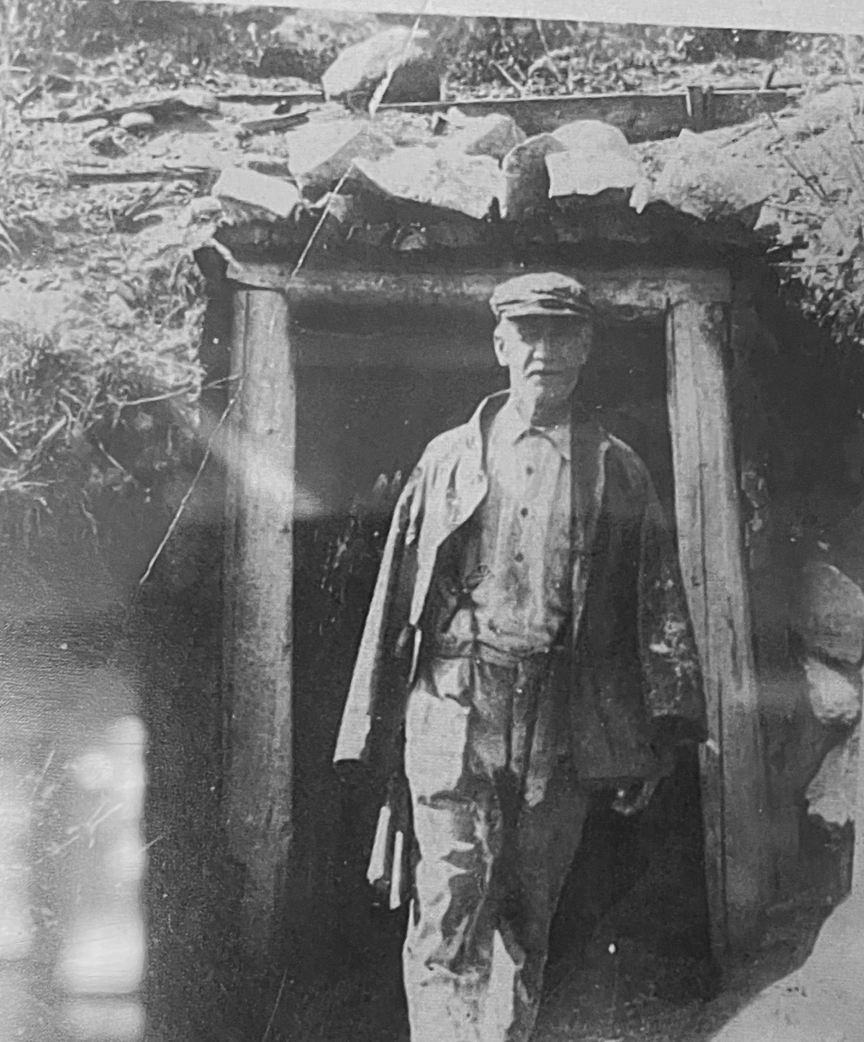
M.F. Eby

The hot springs area was used by local Indigenous peoples before the arrival of settlers.

In the 1890s M.F. Eby recorded a mining claim at the site. In 1917, mineral development and mining began. Eby sold the claim in the 1920s to E.H. Heller who passed the property along to his son, Leland.

In the 1930s, Silver Creek Lookout and campgrounds were built by CCC troops. Logging in the area began in the 1950s, and in 1959 a watershed research area was designated to study the impact of logging on the bathsolith. In 1956, Heller sold the property to Mert Lyons who along with Floyd Suttle built a series of hot springs resort cabins that became the Silver Creek Plunge, was built; the establishment claims that the hot springs "began as a silver mine in the late 1890s" and was used by miners.

In 2005, diesel oil was observed discharging from the hot spring at the Silver Creek Plunge commercial hot spring resort pool. The owner of the establishment was found to have a leaking 2,000 gallon storage tank that fed a generator, releasing 725 gallons of oil (80% #2 diesel and 20% cooking oil) into the spring. The leak occurred in winter and was not discovered until Spring. The fuel oil leaked into the hot springs pool and surrounding soil; 300 yards of contaminated soil were removed and the fuel that leaked into the commercial pool was removed using absorbent pads.

== Water profile ==
The hot spring water emerges from the source at 102 °F / 39 °C at a rate of 540 gallons per minute.
