= Clementsville =

Clementsville may refer to:

- Clementsville, Idaho
- Clementsville, Kentucky
