= Bench, Idaho =

Unincorporated community in the state of Idaho, United States

- Unincorporated community
- Location within Idaho Location within the United States
- Coordinates: 42°30′13″N 111°40′49″W
- Country: United States
- State: Idaho
- County: Caribou
- Elevation: 5,489 ft (1,673 m)
- Time zone: UTC-7 (Mountain (MST))
  - Summer (DST): UTC-6 (MDT)
- Area codes: 208, 986
- GNIS feature ID: 396102

Bench is an unincorporated community in Caribou County, in the U.S. state of Idaho.

== Geography ==
Bench is located along Niter-Bench Road.

== History ==
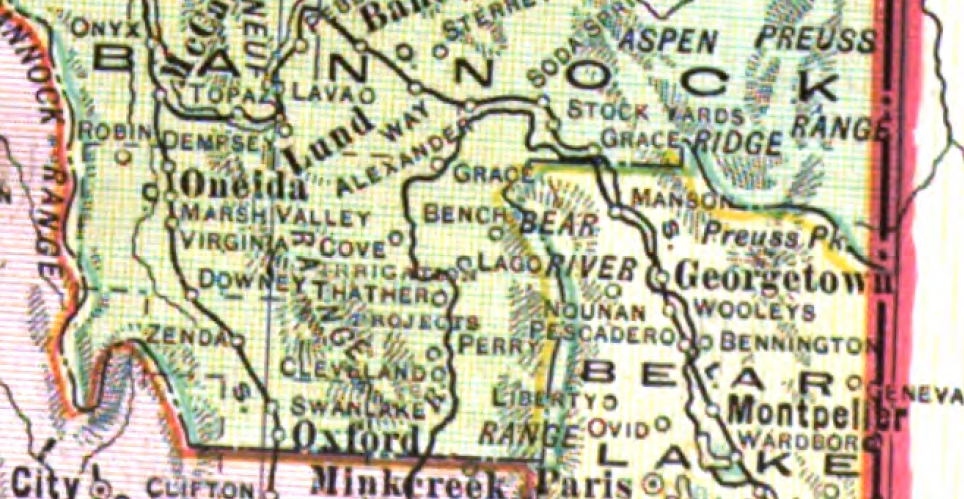
Location of Bench, in what was then part of southern Bannock County, Idaho, in 1909

The community of Bench is part of the Gem Valley, an area that also includes the communities of Grace, Turner, Central, Lund, Bancroft, and Niter.

The first settlers in the area were the Collins, Christiansen, and Hubbard families, who settled the place in 1877. These were the only three families until about 1890. Logging was a major industry in the community, and at that time there were two sawmills: one operated by Joe Tolman and one operated by Charles Hubbard.

A post office called Bench was established in 1902, and remained in operation until 1923. The community was named for a prominent landform near the original town site, commonly referred to as a "bench". The "settlers attempted dry farming with little success"; the Bench Canal Company was formed to provide irrigation to the area. The Bench Canal, a 27-mile-long irrigation system, received water in July 1902, but was not completed until October 1919, due to the scarcity of labor caused by servicemen entering World War I.

In 1906, Bench was on the Soda Springs-Lago stagecoach line, which connected Grace, Niter, and Bench to the community of Soda Springs, which would in 1919 become the county seat of Caribou County. Bench's population was 75 in 1909.

In addition to the post office, a number of businesses operated in Bench. In the early 1900s, Bench's sawmill was owned by the Tolman family. The Bench grade school was located one half mile west of the crossroads.

Bench's population was 90 in 1925.

The Bench chapel, a Mormon church, was dedicated in 1936.

Bench is closely associated with the nearby community of Niter; the two communities, separated by the Bench Canal, shared a newspaper column, titled "Niter-Bench", in the Caribou County Sun from 1957 to 1977.

The Bench Ward Chapel was sold in 1955, after the ward was consolidated with the nearby Williams ward.

Bench regulated kissing on Sunday, requiring the participants to "'pause for breath' between each kiss."

== See also ==
- Chesterfield, Idaho
