= Bench =

Bench, The Bench, Benched, or Benching may refer to:

== Furniture ==
- Bench (furniture), a long seat
  - Memorial bench, a bench commemorating someone who is deceased
- Workbench, a table at which manual work is done
- Countertop or benchtop

== Arts ==
- The Bench (film), a 2000 Danish film
- The Bench (TV series), a 2001 British series
- The Bench (Hogarth), a painting by William Hogarth
- The Bench (book), a 2021 children's book by Meghan, Duchess of Sussex
- Benched (film), a 2018 sports drama
- Benched (TV series), a 2014 sitcom
- "Benched" (Modern Family), an episode of sitcom Modern Family
- "Benched", an episode of drama series Hit the Floor

== Business ==
- Bench (Philippine clothing brand)
- Bench (British clothing brand)
- Bench Accounting, a company

== Geology ==
- Bench (geology), a long, relatively narrow strip of relatively level or gently inclined land of differing origins that is bounded by distinctly steeper slopes above and below it
- Benches, steps cut into the side of open-pit mines

== Law and politics ==
- Bench (law), the location where a judge sits while in court, often a raised desk in a courtroom; also refers to the judiciary as a whole, and to a group of judges hearing a case and judging on a case
  - Bench, the panel or body of justices of the peace in a specific county under the traditional English system of magistracy

== People ==
- Jo Bench, English death metal bass player
- Johnny Bench (born 1947), American baseball player
- Lauren Bench (born 1997), American ice hockey player

== Places ==
- Bench, Idaho
- Bench (woreda), a district in Ethiopia

== Spoken ==
- Bench language, spoken in the Bench Maji Zone of Ethiopia
  - Bench people, an ethnic group of Ethiopia, speakers of the Bench language
- Benching, bentching, or bentsching: the recitation of Birkat Hamazon, a Jewish blessing after eating a meal, also known as Grace After Meals

== Sports ==
- Bench, the place where players available for substitution wait (synonymously dugout); also used as a metonym to refer to the substitute players collectively, while an active player leaving the field to become a substitute is benched
  - In soccer, the technical area contains the bench
- Utility bench, a piece of weight training equipment
- Bench press, one of three power-lifting exercises, commonly referred to as benching
- The Bench, the student rooting section for the University of California men's basketball team

== See also ==
- Benchmark (disambiguation)
- Benchmarking, the practice of comparing business processes and performance metrics to industry bests and best practices
- Benchmarking (hobby), a recreational activity in which participants search for benchmarks using a handheld Global Positioning System
