= Fairview, Idaho =

Fairview is the name of some places in the U.S. state of Idaho:

- Fairview, Franklin County, Idaho
- Fairview, Owyhee County, Idaho, an old mining ghost town in the Silver City Historic District (Idaho)
- Fairview, Power County, Idaho
- Fairview, Twin Falls County, Idaho

== See also ==
- Fairview (disambiguation)
