= 2012 United States presidential election in Idaho =

- November 6, 2012

Nominee	Mitt Romney	Barack Obama
Party	Republican	Democratic
Home state	Massachusetts	Illinois
Running mate	Paul Ryan	Joe Biden
Electoral vote	4	0
Popular vote	420,911	212,787
Percentage	64.09%	32.40%

Romney
50–60%
60–70%
70–80%
80–90%
90–100%
Obama
40–50%
50–60%
President before election
Barack Obama
Democratic
Elected President
Barack Obama
Democratic

The 2012 United States presidential election in Idaho took place on November 6, 2012, as part of the 2012 United States presidential election in which all 50 states plus the District of Columbia participated. Idaho voters chose four electors to represent them in the Electoral College via a popular vote pitting incumbent Democratic President Barack Obama and his running mate, Vice President Joe Biden, against Republican challenger and former Massachusetts Governor Mitt Romney and his running mate, Congressman Paul Ryan. Prior to the election, 17 news organizations considered this a state Romney would win, or otherwise considered as a safe red state. Romney and Ryan carried Idaho with 64.09% of the popular vote to Obama's and Biden's 32.40%, thus winning the state's four electoral votes. Romney's victory in Idaho made it his fourth strongest state in the 2012 election after Utah, Wyoming and Oklahoma. He improved on McCain's performance in 2008, expanding his margin from 25.3% to 31.69% and flipping Teton County which had previously voted for Obama.

== Caucuses ==
=== Democratic caucuses ===
President Obama ran unopposed in the caucuses. The District cast all 31 of its delegate votes at the 2012 Democratic National Convention for Obama.

2012 Idaho Democratic presidential primary
Candidate	State convention delegates	Percentage	Delegates
Barack Obama (incumbent)	1,400	100%	27
Unpledged delegates:			4
Total:	1,400	100%	31

=== Republican caucuses ===
2012 Idaho Republican presidential caucuses
- March 6, 2012

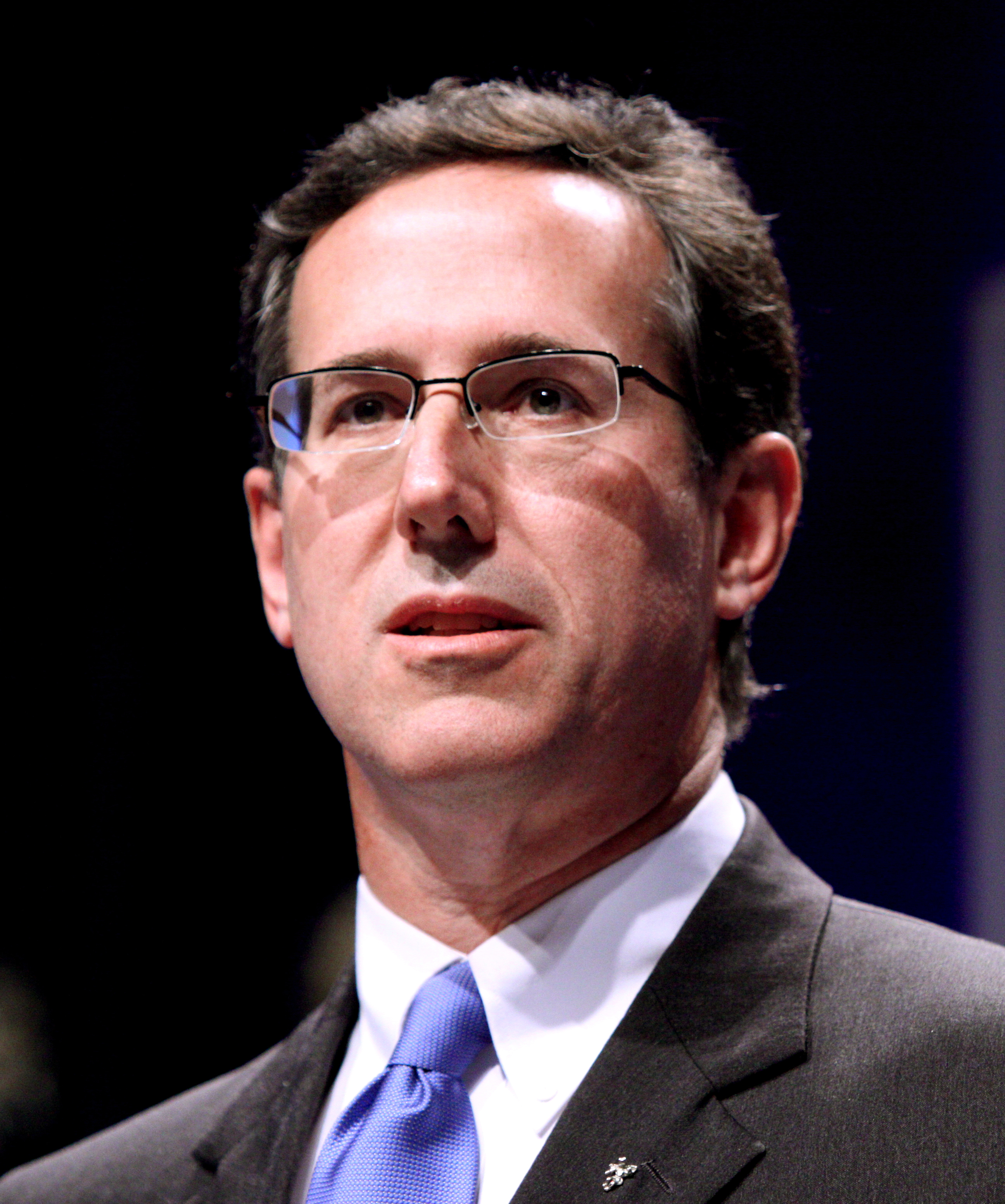

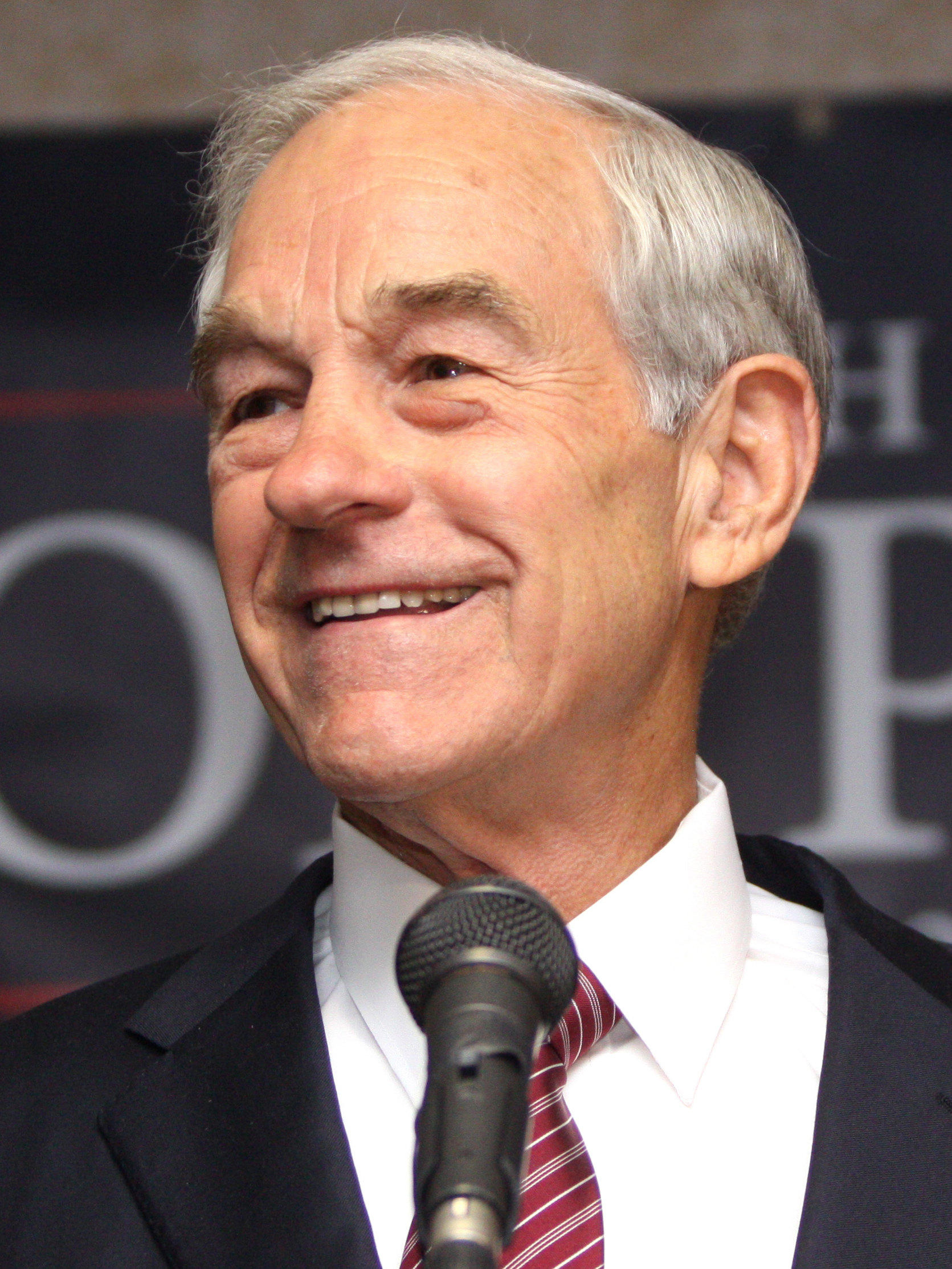
Candidate	Mitt Romney	Rick Santorum	Ron Paul
Home state	Massachusetts	Pennsylvania	Texas
Delegate count	32	0	0
Popular vote	27,514	8,115	8,086
Percentage	61.6%	18.2%	18.1%
- County results Mitt Romney Rick Santorum Ron Paul

The Republican caucuses took place on Super Tuesday, March 6, 2012. An advisory primary with no binding effect on delegates, scheduled to be held on Tuesday May 15, 2012, was cancelled by the Idaho Republican Party. Five candidates were on the ballot. In order of filing they are Ron Paul, Mitt Romney, Rick Santorum, Newt Gingrich, and Buddy Roemer. Although Roemer had withdrawn from the Republican race before the Idaho caucus, he still appeared on the ballot.

Idaho has 32 delegates to the Republican national convention, of which 3 are RNC and 29 are AL. The 3 RNC delegates pledged to go with the results of the Boise Straw Poll. The delegates will be determined by the caucuses results, based on a two-step approach. First, the delegates are primarily awarded winner-take-all by county after a series of votes in which candidates are successively removed from the ballot. Then, if a candidate receives half or more of the county delegates, they will receive all the 32 delegates; if not, the delegates will be split proportionately according to the number of county delegates. Mitt Romney won 61% of the vote, thanks to a large majority of support (80-90% in most counties) in majority Mormon southeastern Idaho, rendering it a winner-take-all contest. Santorum and Paul split the Panhandle, winning five counties each, but came away empty in the delegate count.

==== Straw polls ====
Despite a complete lack of formal polling in the state, there were a total of five straw polls conducted in Idaho, three of which were online. Ron Paul won three of these, while Mitt Romney won two.

===== January 2–4 online poll =====
This was the first ever Idaho straw poll. It was conducted entirely online by Kaz Wittig KStar Enterprises. Ron Paul won with over 70% of the vote.

Finish	Candidate	Percentage
1	Ron Paul	73.53%
2	Rick Santorum	8.09%
3	Newt Gingrich	7.35%
4	Mitt Romney	5.15%
5	Barack Obama	3.68%
6	Gary Johnson	1.47%
7	Rick Perry	0.74%
8	Jon Huntsman	0.00%
9	Michele Bachmann	0.00%
	Total	100%

===== January 6 Boise poll =====
This poll used paper ballots and was conducted in Boise. Ron Paul won this poll. Rick Perry's campaign, although still active in the race at this time, did not participate.

Finish	Candidate	Percentage	Votes
1	Ron Paul	43%	173
2	Mitt Romney	34%	135
3	Newt Gingrich	12%	47
4	Rick Santorum	10%	40
5	Jon Huntsman	1%	4
	Total	100%	399

===== February 2–4 online poll =====
This online straw poll was also produced by Kaz Wittig KStar Enterprises. Mitt Romney won the poll by a small margin.

Finish	Candidate	Percentage
1	Mitt Romney	45.39%
2	Ron Paul	42.70%
3	Rick Santorum	4.49%
4	Newt Gingrich	3.82%
5	Barack Obama	3.15%
6	Other	0.45%
	Total	100%

===== March 1–3 online poll =====
This poll was also produced by Kaz Wittig KStar Enterprises. Ron Paul won by a double-digit margin.

Finish	Candidate	Percentage	Votes
1	Ron Paul	51.37%	525
2	Mitt Romney	35.03%	358
3	Gary Johnson	3.91%	40
4	Rick Santorum	3.23%	33
5	Virgil Goode	2.84%	29
6	Buddy Roemer	1.96%	20
7	Newt Gingrich	0.98%	10
8	Barack Obama	0.49%	5
9	Other	0.2%	2
	Total	100%	1022

==== Results ====
Results:

Finish	Candidate	Percentage	Votes	Estimated National Delegates
1	Mitt Romney	61.6%	27,514	32
2	Rick Santorum	18.2%	8,115	0
3	Ron Paul	18.1%	8,086	0
4	Newt Gingrich	2.1%	940	0
5	Buddy Roemer	0.0%	17	0
	Total	100%		32

===== County totals =====
County	Newt Gingrich	Ron Paul	Mitt Romney	Rick Santorum	Total	Winner
Ada	307	1766	4233	1866	8172	Romney
Adams	0	85	132	0	217	Romney
Bannock	24	254	1614	146	2038	Romney
Bear Lake	2	15	308	19	344	Romney
Benewah	24	90	26	145	265	Santorum
Bingham	27	215	2172	150	2564	Romney
Blaine	47	79	230	23	379	Romney
Boise	0	128	163	0	291	Romney
Bonner	0	555	0	487	1042	Paul
Bonneville	65	481	3044	235	3825	Romney
Boundary	0	193	64	101	358	Paul
Butte	10	25	153	23	211	Romney
Camas	0	40	38	0	78	Paul
Canyon	0	617	2056	1296	3969	Romney
Caribou	7	22	336	26	391	Romney
Cassia	28	143	1279	144	1594	Romney
Clark	2	8	88	17	115	Romney
Clearwater	0	85	0	151	236	Santorum
Custer	19	48	98	24	189	Romney
Elmore	0	158	281	0	439	Romney
Franklin	4	105	856	29	994	Romney
Fremont	12	76	726	38	852	Romney
Gem	0	150	379	143	672	Romney
Gooding	47	84	299	86	516	Romney
Idaho	0	284	0	191	475	Paul
Jefferson	11	212	1642	114	1979	Romney
Jerome	28	74	331	101	534	Romney
Kootenai	0	496	0	674	1170	Santorum
Latah	78	509	197	188	972	Paul
Lemhi	44	60	217	64	385	Romney
Lewis	0	0	25	44	69	Santorum
Lincoln	14	11	147	49	221	Romney
Madison	7	260	2510	50	2827	Romney
Minidoka	22	80	653	92	847	Romney
Nez Perce	0	127	124	0	251	Paul
Oneida	3	39	241	18	301	Romney
Owyhee	0	0	177	263	440	Santorum
Payette	0	0	428	302	730	Romney
Power	9	13	287	38	347	Romney
Shoshone	0	0	63	74	137	Santorum
Teton	13	44	295	26	378	Romney
Twin Falls	83	332	1228	409	2052	Romney
Valley	0	123	152	0	275	Romney
Washington	0	0	222	269	491	Santorum

Notes

- That these totals reflect the final caucus ballots in each county; where only two candidates have votes totaled, this was likely from other candidates being eliminated in previous rounds of voting. Where all candidates have at least one vote, only one ballot was necessary, since the winning candidate had a majority of votes in that county.
- Vote totals for Buddy Roemer, who had formally withdrawn from the Republican race before the caucus, are not provided.

== General election ==
=== Predictions ===
Source	Ranking	As of
Huffington Post	Safe R	November 6, 2012
CNN	Safe R	November 6, 2012
New York Times	Safe R	November 6, 2012
Washington Post	Safe R	November 6, 2012
RealClearPolitics	Solid R	November 6, 2012
Sabato's Crystal Ball	Solid R	November 5, 2012
FiveThirtyEight	Solid R	November 6, 2012

=== Candidate ballot access ===
- Barack Obama/Joseph Biden, Democratic
- Mitt Romney/Paul Ryan, Republican
- Gary Johnson/James P. Gray, Libertarian
- Jill Stein/Cheri Honkala, Green
- Virgil Goode/Jim Clymer, Constitution
- Rocky Anderson/Luis J. Rodriguez, Justice

=== Results ===
2012 United States presidential election in Idaho
Party	Candidate	Running mate	Votes	Percentage	Electoral votes
Republican	Mitt Romney	Paul Ryan	420,911	64.09%	4
Democratic	Barack Obama (incumbent)	Joe Biden (incumbent)	212,787	32.40%	0
Libertarian	Gary Johnson	Jim Gray	9,453	1.44%	0
Green	Jill Stein	Cheri Honkala	4,402	0.67%	0
Justice	Rocky Anderson	Luis J. Rodriguez	2,499	0.38%	0
Constitution	Virgil Goode	Jim Clymer	2,222	0.34%	0
Totals			656,742	100.00%	4

==== By county ====
County	Mitt Romney Republican		Barack Obama Democratic		Various candidates Other parties		Margin		Total
County	#	%	#	%	#	%	#	%	Total
Ada	97,554	53.53%	77,137	42.33%	7,555	4.14%	20,417	11.20%	182,246
Adams	1,413	68.56%	577	28.00%	71	3.44%	836	40.56%	2,061
Bannock	21,010	59.14%	13,214	37.20%	1,299	3.66%	7,796	21.94%	35,523
Bear Lake	2,489	88.20%	302	10.70%	31	1.10%	2,187	77.50%	2,822
Benewah	2,596	66.82%	1,164	29.96%	125	3.22%	1,432	36.86%	3,885
Bingham	13,440	76.03%	3,822	21.62%	416	2.35%	9,618	54.41%	17,678
Blaine	3,939	38.64%	5,992	58.78%	263	2.58%	-2,053	-20.14%	10,194
Boise	2,284	66.28%	1,053	30.56%	109	3.16%	1,231	35.72%	3,446
Bonner	11,367	60.45%	6,500	34.57%	936	4.98%	4,867	25.88%	18,803
Bonneville	32,276	74.68%	9,903	22.91%	1,038	2.41%	22,373	51.77%	43,217
Boundary	3,138	69.06%	1,225	26.96%	181	3.98%	1,913	42.10%	4,544
Butte	1,001	77.84%	258	20.06%	27	2.10%	743	57.78%	1,286
Camas	402	69.55%	159	27.51%	17	2.94%	243	42.04%	578
Canyon	44,369	66.47%	19,866	29.76%	2,512	3.77%	24,503	36.71%	66,747
Caribou	2,608	85.45%	386	12.65%	58	1.90%	2,222	72.80%	3,052
Cassia	7,154	84.84%	1,098	13.02%	180	2.14%	6,056	71.82%	8,432
Clark	235	71.65%	66	20.12%	27	8.23%	169	51.53%	328
Clearwater	2,541	68.75%	1,032	27.92%	123	3.33%	1,509	40.83%	3,696
Custer	1,744	74.06%	530	22.51%	81	3.43%	1,214	51.55%	2,355
Elmore	5,227	65.31%	2,513	31.40%	263	3.29%	2,714	33.91%	8,003
Franklin	5,195	92.77%	325	5.80%	80	1.43%	4,870	86.97%	5,600
Fremont	4,907	84.57%	810	13.96%	85	1.47%	4,097	70.61%	5,802
Gem	5,311	70.90%	1,957	26.12%	223	2.98%	3,354	44.78%	7,491
Gooding	3,696	72.22%	1,287	25.15%	135	2.63%	2,409	47.07%	5,118
Idaho	5,921	75.52%	1,708	21.79%	211	2.69%	4,213	53.73%	7,840
Jefferson	9,895	86.94%	1,303	11.45%	183	1.61%	8,592	75.49%	11,381
Jerome	4,804	71.52%	1,699	25.29%	214	3.19%	3,105	46.23%	6,717
Kootenai	39,381	65.09%	18,851	31.16%	2,273	3.75%	20,530	33.93%	60,505
Latah	7,589	44.32%	8,306	48.51%	1,229	7.17%	-717	-4.19%	17,124
Lemhi	3,029	73.70%	960	23.36%	121	2.94%	2,069	50.34%	4,110
Lewis	1,173	72.63%	396	24.52%	46	2.85%	777	48.11%	1,615
Lincoln	1,141	68.61%	469	28.20%	53	3.19%	672	40.41%	1,663
Madison	13,445	93.29%	832	5.77%	135	0.94%	12,613	87.52%	14,412
Minidoka	5,442	78.04%	1,390	19.93%	141	2.03%	4,052	58.11%	6,973
Nez Perce	9,967	58.65%	6,451	37.96%	575	3.39%	3,516	20.69%	16,993
Oneida	1,838	87.98%	217	10.39%	34	1.63%	1,621	77.59%	2,089
Owyhee	2,794	75.03%	833	22.37%	97	2.60%	1,961	52.66%	3,724
Payette	6,004	70.68%	2,271	26.73%	220	2.59%	3,733	43.95%	8,495
Power	1,870	64.39%	982	33.82%	52	1.79%	888	30.57%	2,904
Shoshone	2,699	52.43%	2,277	44.23%	172	3.34%	422	8.20%	5,148
Teton	2,458	54.34%	1,926	42.58%	139	3.08%	532	11.76%	4,523
Twin Falls	19,773	69.70%	7,541	26.58%	1,055	3.72%	12,232	43.12%	28,369
Valley	2,664	54.16%	2,095	42.59%	160	3.25%	569	11.57%	4,919
Washington	3,128	72.22%	1,104	25.49%	99	2.29%	2,024	46.73%	4,331
Totals	420,911	64.09%	212,787	32.40%	23,044	3.51%	208,124	31.69%	656,742

Counties that flipped from Democratic to Republican

- Teton (largest city: Victor)

==== By congressional district ====
Romney won both congressional districts.

District	Obama	Romney	Representative
1st	32.19%	64.91%	Raúl Labrador
2nd	33.07%	64.14%	Mike Simpson

== See also ==
- United States presidential elections in Idaho
- 2012 Republican Party presidential primaries
- Results of the 2012 Republican Party presidential primaries
- Idaho Republican Party
