= Glenn Dale =

Glenn Dale may refer to:

- Glenn Dale, Maryland, in the United States
- Glenn Dale Hospital, former tuberculosis sanitarium in Prince George's County, Maryland

== See also ==
- Glen Dale (disambiguation)
- Glenndale (disambiguation)
- Glendale (disambiguation)
