= Pingree, Idaho =

Unincorporated community in Bingham County, Idaho, United States

- Unincorporated community
- Location in Idaho Location in the United States
- Coordinates: 43°07′00″N 112°35′55″W
- Country: United States
- State: Idaho
- County: Bingham
- Elevation: 4,452 ft (1,357 m)
- Time zone: UTC-7 (Mountain (MST))
  - Summer (DST): UTC-6 (MDT)
- ZIP code: 83262
- Area codes: 208, 986
- GNIS feature ID: 397041

Pingree is an unincorporated community in Bingham County, Idaho, United States. Pingree is located on Idaho State Highway 39 southwest of Blackfoot and northwest of Pocatello.

== Notable people ==
- Ben Hammond, is an American sculptor and painter. His sculpture of Martha Hughes Cannon will represent Utah in the National Statuary Hall Collection in the United States Capitol. Since 2007 Hammond has completed portrait busts for the Pro Football Hall of Fame including Jason Taylor and Champ Bailey.
