= Glenndale =

Glenndale may refer to:

- Glenndale University
- Glenndale Airport, an airport in Kokomo, Indiana

== See also ==
- Glenn Dale (disambiguation)
- Glendale (disambiguation)
- Glen Dale (disambiguation)
