= Liberty, Bingham County, Idaho =

Unincorporated community in Bingham County, Idaho, United States

Liberty, Idaho
- Unincorporated community
- Location in Idaho Location in the United States
- Coordinates: 43°10′8″N 112°33′19″W
- Country: United States
- State: Idaho
- County: Bingham
- Elevation: 4,462 ft (1,360 m)

Population
  - Estimate (July 2022): 49,923
  - Density: 22.9/sq mi (8.8/km^{2})
- Time zone: UTC-7 (Mountain (MST))
  - Summer (DST): UTC-6 (MDT)
- ZIP Code: 83262
- Area codes: 208, 986
- GNIS feature ID: 376167

Liberty is an unincorporated community in Bingham County, Idaho, United States. Liberty is located along State Highway 39, about 10.5 miles (16.9 km) west–southwest of Blackfoot.

== Demographics ==
As of 2022, Liberty was estimated to have a population of 49,923 people in 15,640 households, a 4 percent growth since 2020.

=== Age ===
The majority of the population (55.8%) is between the ages of 18 and 65, with 6.6% being under 5 years old, 29.0% under the age of 18, and 15.2% over the age of 65. Of those under 65, 11.9% have a disability and 11.9% do not have health insurance.

=== Education ===
While most residents over the age of 25 graduated from high school (89.3%), only 19.6% have a university degree.

=== Home ownership ===
The majority of the population owns their home (77.1%) with the average home cost being US$190,600; the average gross rent is US$718.

=== Income ===
The average household income in Liberty is US$63,106 with a per capita income being US$26,098; 11.3% of people live below the poverty line.

=== Race and ethnicity ===
The population is primarily white (89.2%). Some members of the community are Black/African American (0.7%), Indigenous (6.9%), Asian or Asian-American (0.9%), and Native Hawaiian or Pacific Islander (0.2%). A small percent of the population identifies as multiracial (2.1%); 18.2% identifies as Hispanic or Latino. Most people (86.0%) speak English at home.
