= Pioneerville, Idaho =

Unincorporated community in the state of Idaho, United States

Coordinates: 43°58′8″N 115°50′48″W

Pioneerville is an unincorporated community located in Boise County, Idaho, United States.
