= Glen Dale =

Glen Dale may refer to

- Glen Dale, West Virginia
- Glen Dale, English guitarist (The Fortunes), stage name of Richard Garforth (1943).

== See also ==
- Glendale (disambiguation)
- Glenndale (disambiguation)
- Glenn Dale (disambiguation)
