= Ben Hammond =

American sculptor (born 1977)

- Born: Ben Hammond; 1977 (age 48–49); Pingree, Idaho, U.S.
- Known for: Sculpture
- Notable work: Martha Hughes Cannon in the National Statuary Hall Collection, Pro Football Hall of Fame busts
- Website: www.benhammondfineart.com

Ben Hammond (born 1977) is an American sculptor and painter.

His sculpture of Martha Hughes Cannon represents Utah in the National Statuary Hall Collection in the United States Capitol. The 7 foot, 6 inch statue of Cannon was molded from bronze, and replaced a statue of Philo T. Farnsworth.

Hammond studied art at Ricks College, graduating with a degree in Illustration.

Since 2007, Hammond has completed portrait busts for the Pro Football Hall of Fame including Jason Taylor and Champ Bailey. He created five large sculptures for the Healing Gardens of the Methodist Women's Hospital in Omaha, Nebraska.

In 2015, he received the Gloria Medal and the Beverly Hoyt Robertson Memorial Award. He received the Charlotte Geffken prize in 2010 and 2011 from The National Competition for Figurative Sculpture. He is a three-time winner of the Dexter Jones Award for his work in bas-relief from the National Sculpture Society.

Hammond lives in American Fork, Utah and is a member of the Church of Jesus Christ of Latter-day Saints.
