= Springfield, Idaho =

Unincorporated community in Bingham County, Idaho, United States

- Unincorporated community
- Location in Idaho Location in the United States
- Coordinates: 43°04′54″N 112°40′55″W
- Country: United States
- State: Idaho
- County: Bingham
- Elevation: 4,429 ft (1,350 m)
- Time zone: UTC-7 (Mountain (MST))
  - Summer (DST): UTC-6 (MDT)
- ZIP code: 83277
- Area codes: 208, 986
- GNIS feature ID: 400107

Springfield is an unincorporated community in Bingham County, Idaho, United States. Springfield is located on Idaho State Highway 39 12.5 miles (20.1 km) northeast of Aberdeen. Springfield has a post office with ZIP code 83277.
