= Frank Chester Robertson =

American writer (1890–1969)

Frank Chester Robertson (January 12, 1890 – July 29, 1969) was an American author best known for his western novels. He published over 150 hard cover books and countless other short stories, serials and newspaper articles. In later years, he also wrote a column for the Provo Herald called "The Chopping Block".

== Early life ==
Robertson was born in Moscow, Idaho. His father had become a convert to the Church of Jesus Christ of Latter-day Saints (LDS Church) and moved his family to Chesterfield, Idaho. His family were farmers. To help support his family while his father was away on LDS missions, Robertson herded sheep and his mom briefly became a postmistress. In 1914, he obtained a 320 acres (1.3 km^{2}) homestead in the hills a few miles east of Chesterfield. In 1919, he married Winifred "Winnie" Bowman with whom he had three children. After moving to Ogden Utah in the 1920s and then Salt Lake City, Robertson and his family settled in Mapleton Utah in 1937. He lived the rest of his life in Mapleton, writing stories and working in his cherry orchards.

== Career ==
Robertson started writing short stories while in Chesterfield. He wrote his first novel in 1924 titled, The Foreman of the Forty Bar. The novel was first published in People’s Popular Monthly and then syndicated in several newspapers. It was published as a book in 1925. His most popular book was his 1950 autobiographical book, A Ram in the Thicket: The Story of a Roaming Homesteader Family on the Mormon Frontier, which was later condensed in Reader's Digest. His prime writing years were from the 1920s to the 1940s, but he continued writing until his death. He wrote under several pseudonyms including Frank Chesterfield, Robert Crane and King Hill.

In 1954, the Western Writers of America presented the Silver Spur award for best juvenile story for Robertson's story, Sagebrush Sorrel. He was also the 1959-1960 president of the Western Writers of America. His library of letters, notes, and correspondence were donated to BYU's Harold B. Lee Library.
