= Cache, Idaho =

Unincorporated community in the state of Idaho, United States

- Unincorporated community
- Location within Idaho Location within the United States
- Coordinates: 43°47′17″N 111°09′47″W
- Country: United States
- State: Idaho
- County: Teton
- Elevation: 6,047 ft (1,843 m)
- Time zone: UTC-7 (Mountain (MST))
  - Summer (DST): UTC-6 (MDT)
- ZIP code: 83424
- Area codes: 208, 986
- GNIS feature ID: 397513

Cache is an unincorporated community in Teton County, in the U.S. state of Idaho.

== Geography ==
Cache is located near the junction of county roads W 4000 N and N 3000 W.

== History ==
The community received its name from a cache of furs hidden near the site by French fur traders. An alternate explanation is that it was named Cache because of "the fact that most of the settlers migrated to this spot from Cache Valley, Utah."

A post office called Cache was established in 1904, and remained in operation until 1916. A variant name was "Dwight".

Cache was platted (under the name Cache City) by HP Mack, his wife Sarah Mack, Lewis Buxton, Henry Mickelson, his wife Chloe Mickelson, AW Meikle, and his wife Amelia Meikle in 1907. The plat was 16 blocks in size, being four blocks long and four blocks wide. The plat was officially filed on June 24, 1907.

Cache's population was estimated at 100 in 1909.

== See also ==
- Haden, Idaho
