= Cornwall, Idaho =

Unincorporated community in Idaho, United States

Coordinates: 46°42′32″N 116°51′57″W

Cornwall is an unincorporated community in Latah County, in the U.S. state of Idaho.

== History ==
Cornwall was founded in 1887 by Mason Cornwall, and named for him. A post office was established at Cornwall in 1887, and remained in operation until it was discontinued in 1901.

The founder's home, the Mason Cornwall House, is listed on the National Register of Historic Places.

Cornwall's population was 50 in 1909.
