= Chesterfield, Idaho =

- Chesterfield Historic District
- U.S. National Register of Historic Places
- U.S. Historic district
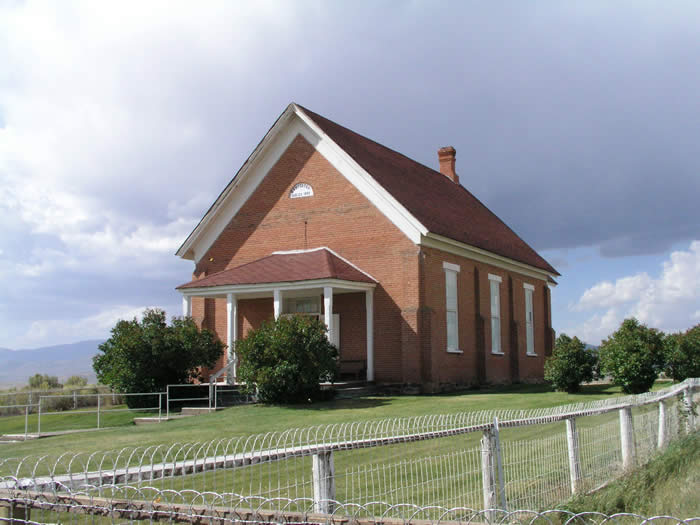
- Chesterfield LDS Meetinghouse

- Location within Idaho Location within the United States
- Location: Caribou County, Idaho
- Nearest city: Bancroft, Idaho
- Coordinates: 42°52′01″N 111°54′07″W
- Area: 2,160 acres (870 ha)
- Built: 1881
- Architectural style: Greek Revival, Queen Anne, Hall-and-parlor; I-house
- NRHP reference No.: 80001297
- Added to NRHP: December 4, 1980

Chesterfield is a ghost town in Caribou County, Idaho, United States. It is located in Gem Valley at an elevation of 5,446 feet (1,660 m). The community includes a cemetery and former buildings of the Church of Jesus Christ of Latter-day Saints (LDS Church) such as a former meeting house, amusement hall and tithing house.

Located along a route of the Oregon Trail, Chesterfield was founded by Mormon settlers in 1881. After a railroad line was built through Bancroft to the south, the community lost some of its momentum, and agricultural difficulties led to its desertion by the end of the 1930s. Today, the community is operated as a tourist attraction, with guided tours and a museum.

In 1980, the community was listed on the National Register of Historic Places as a historic district and is also on the Mormon Historic Sites Foundation's Mormon Historic Sites Registry. The historic district includes 41 buildings and eight sites, spread out over an area of 2,160 acres (870 ha). Some buildings in the district are examples of the Greek Revival and Queen Anne architectural styles.

== History ==
In 1879, Chester Call and his niece's husband, Christian Nelson, established a horse ranch in the area. Thinking this might be a good area in which to live, Chester Call told his family and friends about the area and they decided to come and settle in 1881 and 1882. Chesterfield's first settlers built their homes in the river bottom of the Portneuf River, west of present-day Chesterfield. Unlike typical Mormon settlements, which were founded by settlers sent by The Church of Jesus Christ of Latter-Day Saints (hereafter referred to as LDS) authorities, the community was founded spontaneously by its first settlers and not set up in the typical compact, grid patterned townsite. Also in 1881, the Union Pacific Railroad started to construct the Oregon Short Line Railroad to the south of Chesterfield, running through present-day Bancroft. The new settlers sold logs and railroad ties to the railroad, raising much needed cash.

In 1883, LDS Church authorities visited the area to establish a branch. While there, the visiting leaders asked their members to organize into a central village, away from the Portneuf River flood plain. The current Chesterfield townsite was chosen up along the foothills. As in traditional Mormon towns, Chesterfield was laid out in a grid pattern, consisting of thirty-five ten-acre blocks. By 1890, the LDS meetinghouse and a store were the only buildings on the townsite as a mistake in the government survey kept the land off the market for a time.

The LDS Chesterfield Ward was established in 1884 consisting of 136 people in 24 families. By 1900, the population had steadily grown to 73 families containing 418 people in the Chesterfield Ward and 150 people in the recently split off Hatch Ward. Between the years of 1898 and 1900, the area suffered through very cold winters and a drought. This caused a considerable exodus to occur in 1901. The 1907 Panic, and another bad winter, caused another exodus. By 1908, fewer than 400 people were left in the area and only 208 people in the Chesterfield Ward. The population then steadily grew with a peak of just under 700 people in the Chesterfield area by 1920. The series of recessions in the 1920s and nationwide agricultural problems started the death knell for Chesterfield. Just over 425 people were left in the area by 1928, and the buildings of the Chesterfield town site were mostly deserted before 1941 when the school closed. The general store closed in 1958. By 1970, less than 200 people lived in the area and only 20 people lived in historic Chesterfield.

== Historical buildings ==
The LDS Meetinghouse is the most prominent and best preserved building in Chesterfield. It was built between 1887 and 1892.

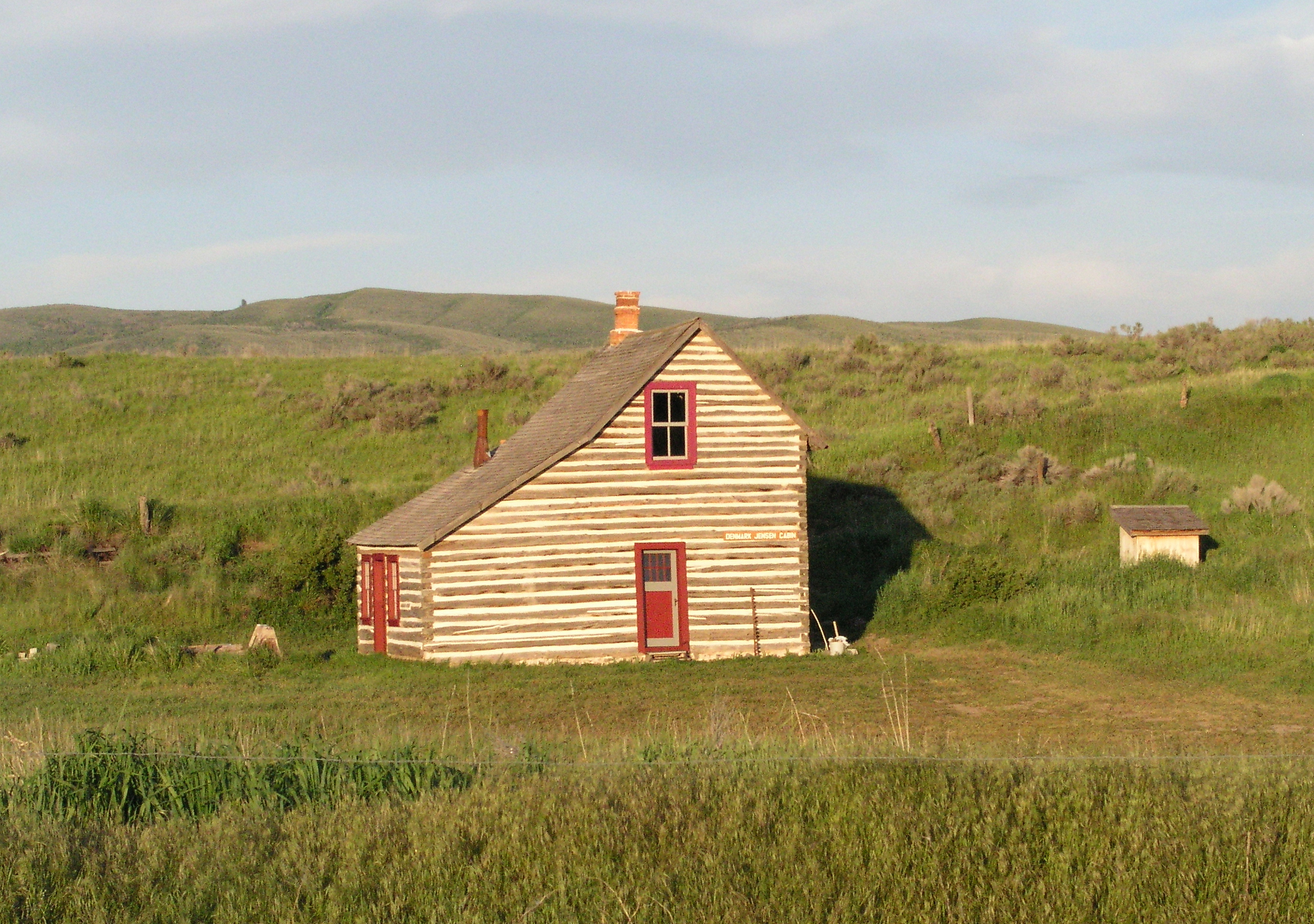
Denmark Jensen Cabin

The original Amusement Hall was erected in 1895, next door to the LDS Meetinghouse. The building was the center for social activities for Chesterfield. It consisted of a large room with a hardwood dance floor and a stage. Over time, the building was reduced to ruins. The Amusement Hall was restored between 1999 and 2003.

LDS members pay tithing to the Church. Few members could pay cash around 1900, so grains, vegetables, eggs and farm animals were instead paid "in kind". The Tithing Office and the Tithing Granary were constructed in 1900. Grain donations were stored in the Tithing Granary. The Tithing Office was where members came to pay their tithing and the goods were dispensed to those in need; the facility acted as a sort of a warehouse and general store.

The Nathan Barlow House, built about 1900, was the home of the postmaster and owner of the general store. After the Panic of 1907 and the harsh winter of 1907-1908, Nathan Barlow lost all of his money and moved out of the community. The home was restored in 2009, with descendants of Nathan Barlow contributing the furnishings.

The Ira Call cabin is a saltbox style home. It contained two polygamous families for a short time.

Aunt Ruth Call David's cabin built of red pine logs with a dirt floor in 1881 and 1882. Aunt Ruth was a Native American who was adopted by Chester Call's parents in the 1860s. As the town's midwife, she delivered most of the babies.

== Notable people ==
- Frank Chester Robertson, Western author
