= Teton County, Idaho =

County in Idaho, United States

- County
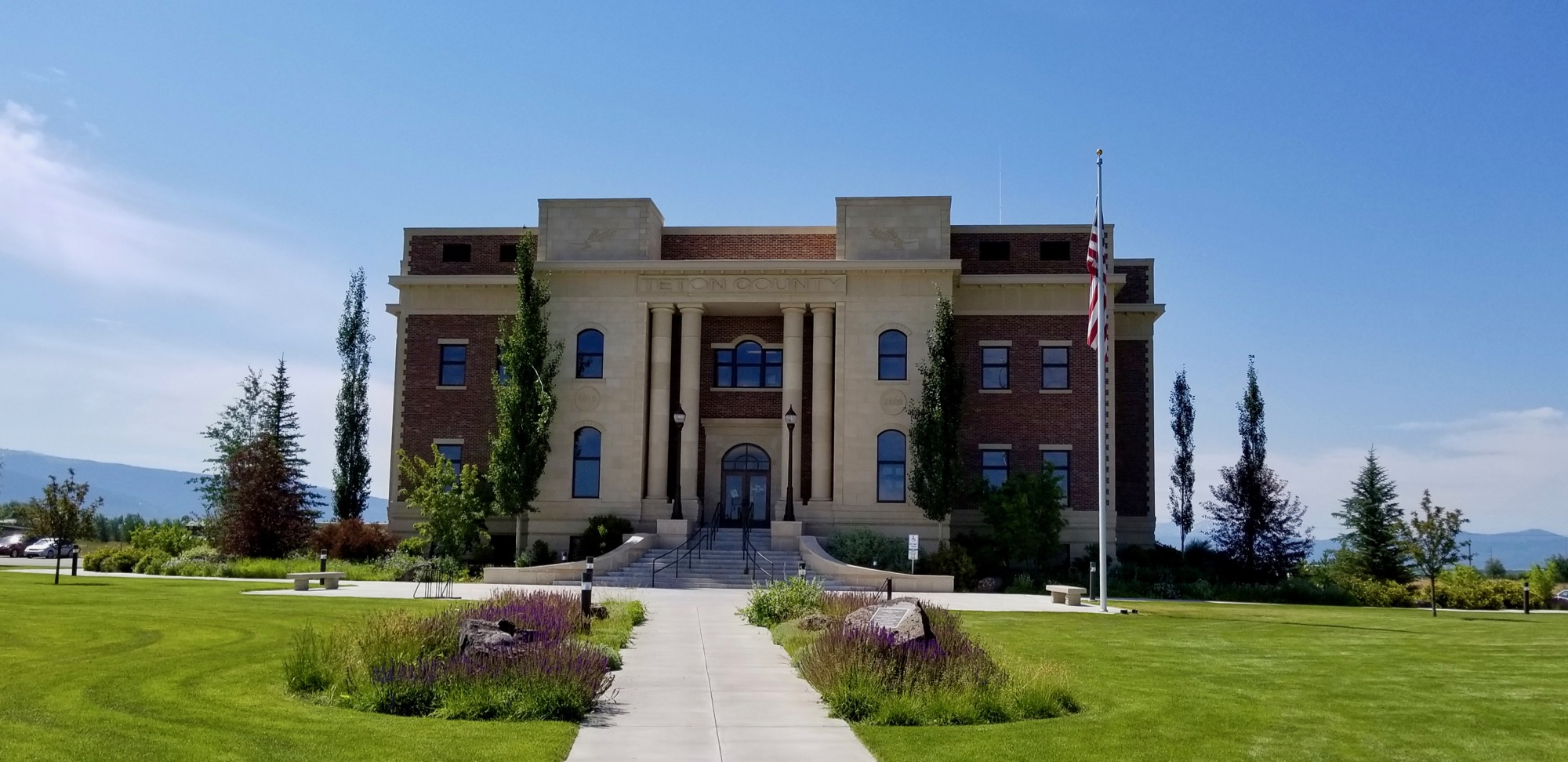
- Teton County Courthouse

- Seal

- Location within the U.S. state of Idaho
- Coordinates: 43°45′N 111°13′W
- Country: United States
- State: Idaho
- Founded: January 26, 1915
- Named for: The Teton Mountains
- Seat: Driggs
- Largest city: Victor

Area
  - Total: 451 sq mi (1,170 km^{2})
  - Land: 449 sq mi (1,160 km^{2})
  - Water: 1.1 sq mi (2.8 km^{2}) 0.2%

Population (2020)
  - Total: 11,630
  - Estimate (2025): 13,254 ▲
  - Density: 25.9/sq mi (10.0/km^{2})
- Time zone: UTC−7 (Mountain)
  - Summer (DST): UTC−6 (MDT)
- Congressional district: 2nd
- Website: tetoncountyidaho.gov

Teton County is a county located in the U.S. state of Idaho. As of the 2020 census, the population was 11,630. The county seat is Driggs, and the largest city is Victor. The county was established in 1915 and was named after the Teton Mountains to the east. Teton County is part of the Jackson, WY-ID Micropolitan Statistical Area.

The Teton Valley was discovered by explorer John Colter in 1808, a member of the Lewis and Clark Expedition (1804–06). It became known as Pierre's Hole, and it hosted the well-attended 1832 Rendezvous, which was followed by the Battle of Pierre's Hole.

== Geography ==
According to the U.S. Census Bureau, the county has a total area of 451 square miles (1,170 km^{2}), of which 449 square miles (1,160 km^{2}) is land and 1.1 square miles (2.8 km^{2}) (0.2%) is water. It is the second-smallest county in Idaho by area.

=== Adjacent counties ===
- Fremont County - north
- Madison County - west
- Bonneville County - south
- Teton County, Wyoming - east

=== Major highways ===
- SH-31
- SH-32
- SH-33

=== National protected area ===
- Targhee National Forest (part)

== Demographics ==
Historical population
| Census | Pop. | Note | %± |
|---|---|---|---|
| 1920 | 3,921 | | — |
| 1930 | 3,573 | | −8.9% |
| 1940 | 3,601 | | 0.8% |
| 1950 | 3,204 | | −11.0% |
| 1960 | 2,639 | | −17.6% |
| 1970 | 2,351 | | −10.9% |
| 1980 | 2,897 | | 23.2% |
| 1990 | 3,439 | | 18.7% |
| 2000 | 5,999 | | 74.4% |
| 2010 | 10,170 | | 69.5% |
| 2020 | 11,630 | | 14.4% |
| 2025 (est.) | 13,254 | ▲ | 14.0% |
U.S. Decennial Census; 1790–1960, 1900–1990, 1990–2000, 2010–2020 2020

=== Racial and ethnic composition ===
Teton County, Idaho – Racial and ethnic composition Note: the US Census treats Hispanic/Latino as an ethnic category. This table excludes Latinos from the racial categories and assigns them to a separate category. Hispanics/Latinos may be of any race.
| Race / Ethnicity (NH = Non-Hispanic) | Pop 1980 | Pop 1990 | Pop 2000 | Pop 2010 | Pop 2020 | % 1980 | % 1990 | % 2000 | % 2010 | % 2020 |
|---|---|---|---|---|---|---|---|---|---|---|
| White alone (NH) | 2,827 | 3,185 | 5,210 | 8,286 | 9,141 | 97.58% | 92.61% | 86.85% | 81.47% | 78.60% |
| Black or African American alone (NH) | 1 | 2 | 6 | 12 | 16 | 0.03% | 0.06% | 0.10% | 0.12% | 0.14% |
| Native American or Alaska Native alone (NH) | 10 | 13 | 26 | 27 | 25 | 0.35% | 0.38% | 0.43% | 0.27% | 0.21% |
| Asian alone (NH) | 4 | 1 | 11 | 48 | 51 | 0.14% | 0.03% | 0.18% | 0.47% | 0.44% |
| Native Hawaiian or Pacific Islander alone (NH) | x | x | 6 | 12 | 0 | x | x | 0.10% | 0.12% | 0.00% |
| Other race alone (NH) | 2 | 1 | 3 | 3 | 37 | 0.07% | 0.03% | 0.05% | 0.03% | 0.32% |
| Mixed race or Multiracial (NH) | x | x | 32 | 61 | 340 | x | x | 0.53% | 0.60% | 2.92% |
| Hispanic or Latino (any race) | 53 | 237 | 705 | 1,721 | 2,020 | 1.83% | 6.89% | 11.75% | 16.92% | 17.37% |
| Total | 2,897 | 3,439 | 5,999 | 10,170 | 11,630 | 100.00% | 100.00% | 100.00% | 100.00% | 100.00% |

=== 2020 census ===
As of the 2020 census, the county had a population of 11,630, and the median age was 37.7 years; 25.9% of residents were under age 18 and 12.8% were 65 years of age or older. For every 100 females, there were 108.8 males, and for every 100 females age 18 and over, there were 108.5 males.

The racial makeup of the county was 80.9% White, 0.2% Black or African American, 0.7% American Indian and Alaska Native, 0.5% Asian, 0.0% Native Hawaiian and Pacific Islander, 10.2% from some other race, and 7.5% from two or more races. Hispanic or Latino residents of any race comprised 17.4% of the population.

0.0% of residents lived in urban areas, while 100.0% lived in rural areas.

There were 4,360 households in the county, of which 34.3% had children under the age of 18 living with them, and 16.5% had a female householder with no spouse or partner present. About 22.6% of all households were made up of individuals, and 7.5% had someone living alone who was 65 years of age or older.

There were 5,815 housing units, of which 25.0% were vacant. Among occupied housing units, 72.5% were owner-occupied, and 27.5% were renter-occupied. The homeowner vacancy rate was 2.5%, and the rental vacancy rate was 16.9%.

=== 2010 census ===
As of the 2010 United States census, there were 10,170 people, 3,651 households, and 2,509 families living in the county. The population density was 22.6 inhabitants per square mile (8.7/km^{2}). There were 5,478 housing units at an average density of 12.2 units per square mile (4.7 units/km^{2}). The racial makeup of the county was 85.6% white, 0.5% Asian, 0.3% American Indian, 0.2% black or African American, 0.1% Pacific islander, 11.7% from other races, and 1.5% from two or more races. Those of Hispanic or Latino origin made up 16.9% of the population. In terms of ancestry, 29.9% were English, 20.3% were German, 13.0% were Irish, and 4.2% were American.

Of the 3,651 households, 39.3% had children under the age of 18 living with them, 58.9% were married couples living together, 5.9% had a female householder with no husband present, 31.3% were non-families, and 21.9% of all households were made up of individuals. The average household size was 2.78, and the average family size was 3.33. The median age was 33.2 years.

The median income for a household in the county was $53,364, and the median income for a family was $56,791. Males had a median income of $39,865 versus $31,966 for females. The per capita income for the county was $23,633. About 5.4% of families and 7.4% of the population were below the poverty line, including 7.8% of those under age 18 and 2.2% of those age 65 or over.

=== 2000 census ===
As of the census of 2000, there were 5,999 people, 2,078 households, and 1,464 families living in the county. The population density was 13 people per square mile (5.0 people/km^{2}). There were 2,632 housing units at an average density of 6 units per square mile (2.3 units/km^{2}). The racial makeup of the county was 91.32% White, 0.17% Black or African American, 0.55% Native American, 0.18% Asian, 0.23% Pacific Islander, 6.73% from other races, and 0.82% from two or more races. 11.75% of the population were Hispanic or Latino of any race. 25.5% were of English, 15.8% German, 7.6% American and 5.1% Irish ancestry.

There were 2,078 households, out of which 39.70% had children under the age of 18 living with them, 60.30% were married couples living together, 5.80% had a female householder with no husband present, and 29.50% were non-families. 21.30% of all households were made up of individuals, and 5.30% had someone living alone who was 65 years of age or older. The average household size was 2.87, and the average family size was 3.43.

In the county, the population was spread out, with 31.80% under the age of 18, 8.10% from 18 to 24, 33.80% from 25 to 44, 18.90% from 45 to 64, and 7.50% who were 65 years of age or older. The median age was 31 years. For every 100 females, there were 112.70 males. For every 100 females age 18 and over, there were 114.50 males.

The median income for a household in the county was $41,968, and the median income for a family was $45,848. Males had a median income of $32,309 versus $22,243 for females. The per capita income for the county was $17,778. About 9.70% of families and 12.90% of the population were below the poverty line, including 18.10% of those under age 18 and 7.90% of those age 65 or over.

== Government and politics ==
Similar to other Idaho counties, an elected three-member county commission heads the county government. Other elected officials include clerk, treasurer, sheriff, assessor, coroner, and prosecutor.

Until quite recently, Teton County voted Republican along with most other Eastern Idaho counties. However, since 2004, the county has strongly trended towards toss-up status. In 2008, it was one of three Idaho counties to favor Barack Obama, despite giving George W. Bush a 23-point victory only four years earlier. The margin was narrow (39 votes). Obama lost the county to Mitt Romney in 2012 by over five hundred votes; Donald Trump outpolled Hillary Clinton by just eight votes in 2016, the smallest numerical margin in the country. Teton backed Democrat Joe Biden in the 2020 election; he won by 7.3 percentage points, garnering the highest vote share for any Democrat since 1948. In 2024, the margin narrowed, though the county still voted Democratic by a decisive majority.

Teton County is one of only thirteen counties to have voted for Obama in 2008, Romney in 2012, Trump in 2016, and Biden in 2020. (Note: The other twelve are Butte County, California; Kendall County, Illinois; McLean County, Illinois; Tippecanoe County, Indiana; Kent County, Maryland; Kent County, Michigan; Leelanau County, Michigan; Carroll County, New Hampshire; Rockingham County, New Hampshire; Marion County, Oregon; Grand County, Utah; and Albany County, Wyoming.)

At the state level, Teton County is in District 32 of the Idaho Legislature. As neighboring counties are still strongly Republican, the district is not competitive. In Idaho gubernatorial elections, the county had voted for the Democratic nominee in every election from 2006 until 2022, when incumbent Republican Gov. Brad Little won the county in his bid for reelection.

United States presidential election results for Teton County, Idaho
| Year | Republican | | Democratic | | Third party(ies) | |
| Year | No. | % | No. | % | No. | % |
|---|---|---|---|---|---|---|
| 1916 | 650 | 46.43% | 726 | 51.86% | 24 | 1.71% |
| 1920 | 906 | 68.90% | 409 | 31.10% | 0 | 0.00% |
| 1924 | 665 | 55.70% | 186 | 15.58% | 343 | 28.73% |
| 1928 | 753 | 68.27% | 348 | 31.55% | 2 | 0.18% |
| 1932 | 674 | 43.74% | 860 | 55.81% | 7 | 0.45% |
| 1936 | 542 | 38.47% | 834 | 59.19% | 33 | 2.34% |
| 1940 | 667 | 44.14% | 844 | 55.86% | 0 | 0.00% |
| 1944 | 552 | 46.27% | 641 | 53.73% | 0 | 0.00% |
| 1948 | 593 | 46.62% | 672 | 52.83% | 7 | 0.55% |
| 1952 | 964 | 66.25% | 491 | 33.75% | 0 | 0.00% |
| 1956 | 842 | 65.12% | 451 | 34.88% | 0 | 0.00% |
| 1960 | 714 | 55.65% | 569 | 44.35% | 0 | 0.00% |
| 1964 | 675 | 53.02% | 598 | 46.98% | 0 | 0.00% |
| 1968 | 694 | 57.93% | 376 | 31.39% | 128 | 10.68% |
| 1972 | 932 | 68.58% | 298 | 21.93% | 129 | 9.49% |
| 1976 | 904 | 63.04% | 514 | 35.84% | 16 | 1.12% |
| 1980 | 1,227 | 72.78% | 360 | 21.35% | 99 | 5.87% |
| 1984 | 1,242 | 76.48% | 370 | 22.78% | 12 | 0.74% |
| 1988 | 982 | 64.31% | 531 | 34.77% | 14 | 0.92% |
| 1992 | 762 | 39.73% | 472 | 24.61% | 684 | 35.66% |
| 1996 | 1,251 | 50.28% | 866 | 34.81% | 371 | 14.91% |
| 2000 | 1,745 | 65.33% | 720 | 26.96% | 206 | 7.71% |
| 2004 | 2,235 | 60.57% | 1,416 | 38.37% | 39 | 1.06% |
| 2008 | 2,263 | 48.57% | 2,302 | 49.41% | 94 | 2.02% |
| 2012 | 2,458 | 54.34% | 1,926 | 42.58% | 139 | 3.07% |
| 2016 | 2,167 | 43.55% | 2,159 | 43.39% | 650 | 13.06% |
| 2020 | 2,858 | 44.92% | 3,318 | 52.15% | 186 | 2.92% |
| 2024 | 3,005 | 44.86% | 3,463 | 51.70% | 230 | 3.43% |

== Education ==
The public schools are operated by Teton County School District 401, the sole school district in the county. The county's only traditional high school, Teton High School, is in Driggs.

The College of Eastern Idaho includes Teton County in its catchment zone; however, the county is not in the College's taxation zone.

== Communities ==
=== Cities ===
- Driggs (county seat)
- Tetonia
- Victor

=== Unincorporated communities ===
- Bates
- Felt
- Clementsville
- Cache
- Darby

== See also ==
- National Register of Historic Places listings in Teton County, Idaho
