= Gem Valley =

Valley in Caribou County, Idaho, United States

Coordinates: 42°34′34″N 111°43′47″W

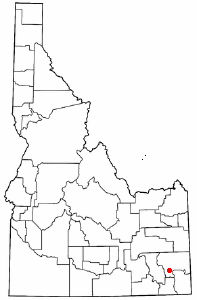
Location of Grace, Idaho

Gem Valley is a rural valley in Caribou County, Bannock, and Franklin counties in Idaho, United States, so named for its local gemstones which can be found throughout the valley. It is approximately 20 miles (32 km) wide at its widest point east to west, and 60–70 miles (97–113 km) long north to south. By local definition, Gem Valley originates at the Chesterfield Reservoir to the north, and terminates at the Oneida Narrows Reservoir to the south.

== History ==
Gem Valley was once inhabited by Shoshone Indians. Artifacts such as arrowheads can still be found there. White settlement dates back to the mid-to-late 19th century. The Oregon Trail passed through the northern part of the valley and several pioneer landmarks such as cemeteries and small settlements can be found throughout the valley.

== Geography ==
Gem Valley is one of the northernmost valleys along the Wasatch Range which extends approximately 160 miles (260 km) south. The valley floor has an elevation roughly 5,000 feet (1,500 m), while the surrounding mountain peaks have an elevation ranging from about 7,000 to 8,500 feet (2,100 to 2,600 m). It is accessed primarily by Idaho State Highway 34 from the south, and U.S. Route 30 from the east and west. Most of the valley is in Caribou County, and portions extend into Franklin County to the south, and Bannock County to the north. The Bear River runs through the valley as well as several small streams.

Grace and Bancroft are the only incorporated towns in Gem Valley. However, there are several unincorporated communities including Cleveland, Thatcher, Lago, Bench, Niter, Dugway, Turner, Stanley, Lund, Tenmile, and Chesterfield. Some of these were once pioneer-era towns and settlements, but the name now denotes a region of the valley, rather than a town with defined boundaries.

== Geology ==
The most common gemstone found in Gem Valley is obsidian. This is the result of several extinct volcanoes and lava domes within the area. Most of the local obsidian is black with low gas content. Some of the mineral contains light brown marbling that is unique to the area. Obsidian plays historical importance to Gem Valley as it was used by the Shoshone Indians that once inhabited for knives and arrowheads. Other local gemstones that are common to Gem Valley are geode, quartz, agate, and petrified wood

Solid basalt can be found beneath the soil throughout most of the valley and exposed outcrops are common. Other types of rock that are common in the area are limestone and shale. These non-volcanic rock beds are rich with fossils of prehistoric marine life once native to Lake Bonneville, ranging from well preserved molluscan shells, to small fish. Trilobite fossils can often be found in local shale deposits.

In the northern end of the valley, limestone is commercially mined and processed into lime which is used elsewhere in concrete and steel production.

Much of the soil in Gem Valley is dark, nitrogen rich volcanic soil. This soil type is ideal for farming, particularly potatoes and grain. Clay sediment is also common.

The Wasatch Fault is visible throughout many parts of the valley due to the sharp displacement that creates a small bench at the foot of the mountains. Mild to moderate earthquakes have been reported to originate at the fault.
