= Grandview, Idaho =

Unincorporated community in Bingham County, Idaho, United States

- Unincorporated community
- Location in Idaho Location in the United States
- Coordinates: 43°3′11″N 112°47′18″W
- Country: United States
- State: Idaho
- County: Bingham
- Elevation: 4,442 ft (1,354 m)
- Time zone: UTC-7 (Mountain (MST))
  - Summer (DST): UTC-6 (MDT)
- ZIP Code: 83210
- Area codes: 208, 986
- GNIS feature ID: 396577

Grandview is an unincorporated community in Bingham County, Idaho, United States, about 8 miles (13 km) north–northeast of Aberdeen. While State Highway 39 currently passes north–south west of Grandview, its original routing run east–west through the community along West 1000 South (Grandvew Road).
