= Glendale (community), Monroe County, Wisconsin =

Glendale, Wisconsin
- Unincorporated community
- Location within Wisconsin Location within the United States
- Coordinates: 43°46′56″N 90°20′44″W
- Country: United States
- State: Wisconsin
- County: Monroe
- Elevation: 1,063 ft (324 m)
- Time zone: UTC-6 (Central (CST))
  - Summer (DST): UTC-5 (CDT)
- Area code: 608
- GNIS feature ID: 1565569

Glendale is an unincorporated community in the town of Glendale, Monroe County, Wisconsin, United States.

== History ==
A post office called Glendale was established in 1856, and remained in operation until it was discontinued in 1926. The name Glendale was selected by an early settler from a book he had read.
