= Fletcher, Idaho =

Unincorporated community in the state of Idaho, United States

- Unincorporated community
- Location within Idaho Location within the United States
- Coordinates: 46°17′22″N 116°24′40″W
- Country: United States
- State: Idaho
- County: Lewis
- Elevation: 3,511 ft (1,070 m)
- Time zone: UTC-8 (Pacific (PST))
  - Summer (DST): UTC-7 (PDT)
- Area codes: 208, 986
- GNIS feature ID: 376154

Fletcher is an unincorporated community located in Lewis County, Idaho, United States.

== History ==
Fletcher's population was estimated at 100 in 1909.
