= Boise County, Idaho =

County in Idaho, United States

- County
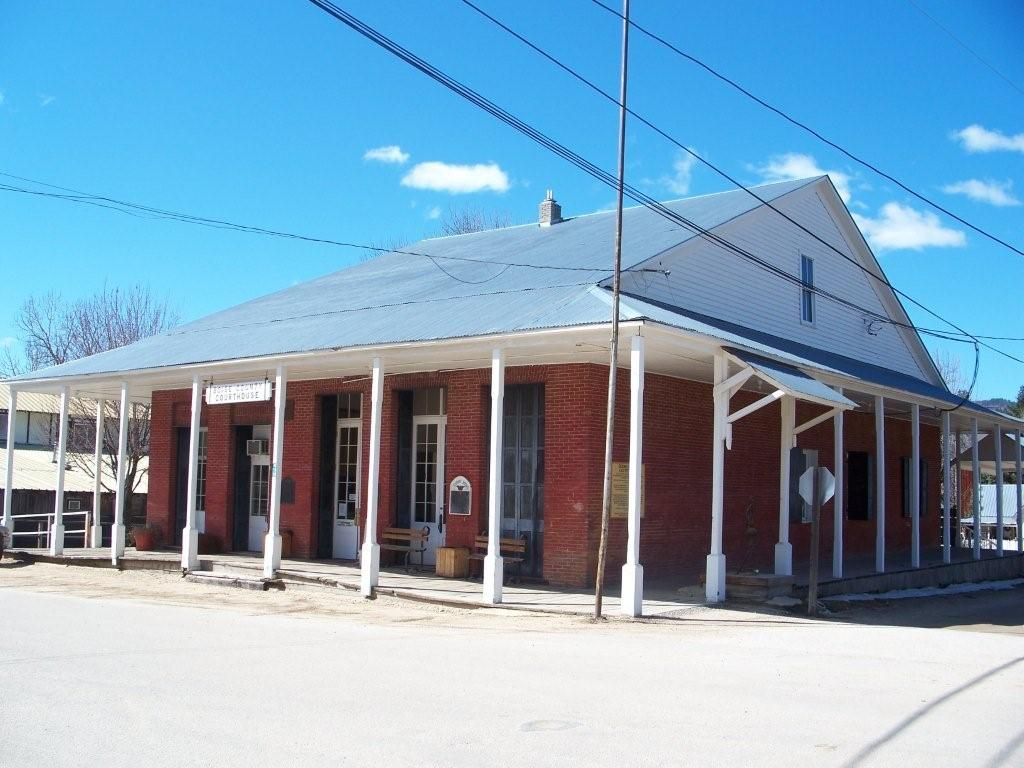
- Boise County Courthouse in Idaho City

- Seal

- Location within the U.S. state of Idaho
- Coordinates: 44°01′N 115°44′W
- Country: United States
- State: Idaho
- Founded: February 4, 1864
- Named for: Boise River
- Seat: Idaho City
- Largest city: Horseshoe Bend

Area
  - Total: 1,907 sq mi (4,940 km^{2})
  - Land: 1,899 sq mi (4,920 km^{2})
  - Water: 7.4 sq mi (19 km^{2}) 0.4%

Population (2020)
  - Total: 7,610
  - Estimate (2025): ▲8,545
  - Density: 3.7/sq mi (1.4/km^{2})
- Time zone: UTC−7 (Mountain)
  - Summer (DST): UTC−6 (MDT)
- Congressional district: 1st
- Website: www.boisecounty.us

Boise County is a rural mountain county in the U.S. state of Idaho. As of the 2020 United States census, the population was 7,610. The county seat is historic Idaho City, which is connected through a series of paved and unpaved roads to Lowman, Centerville, Placerville, Pioneerville, Star Ranch, Crouch, Garden Valley, and Horseshoe Bend.

Boise County is part of the Boise metropolitan area. Despite the name, Boise itself is in nearby Ada County.

The Bogus Basin ski area is in the southwestern part of the county. The county's eastern area contains the central section of the Sawtooth Wilderness, the western part of the Sawtooth National Recreation Area.

In 2010, the center of Idaho's population was in Boise County.

== History ==
The county was established on February 4, 1864, with its county seat at Idaho City. It was named for the Boise River, which was named by French-Canadian explorers and trappers for the great variety of trees growing along its banks in the lower desert valley. The county is one of four Idaho counties that also existed under Washington Territory. On January 12, 1863, The Washington territorial legislature established the county containing most of Idaho below 114° 30', excluding the territory lying west of the Payette River. They established its county seat at what later became Idaho City.

The Boise Basin, which contains Idaho City, was one of the nation's richest gold mining districts; gold was discovered in 1862, and more of it was pulled from present-day Boise County than from the entire state of Alaska. At its peak in the mid-1860s, Idaho City was the largest city in the Northwest, and it was this rapid population influx that led to the establishment of the Idaho Territory in 1863. The lower–elevation communities of Horseshoe Bend (Payette River) and Boise (Boise River) were staging areas for the Boise Basin mines.

The county's boundaries changed several times during Idaho's territorial period. Owyhee County (Idaho's oldest) and a portion of Oneida County were carved from the southern and eastern portion of the county as it existed under Washington Territory in late December 1863 and January 1864. When Idaho Territory established the county in February 1864, it contained all of present Ada, Canyon, and Payette counties. It also included most of present Boise and Gem Counties, the southern half of Washington County, and small portions of Adams, Custer, Owyhee, and Valley counties.

When Ada County was created in December 1864, most of that territory was transferred to Ada County, leaving only small portions of Custer, Gem, Payette, Valley, and Washington counties together with most of present-day Boise County. The Boise River portion of the current western boundary was established by 1866. The southern boundary common to present Ada County was defined the following year. The northern boundary was most volatile Between 1873 and 1887 with the boundary shifting further north into Valley County, back south below Cascade, and then again north to include the North Fork of Payette River Basin. The county obtained its current boundary after Gem County was created in 1915 and Valley County in 1918.

In March 2011, the county filed a Chapter 9 bankruptcy petition due to judgment against the county for violating the Fair Housing Act. The county's petition for Chapter 9 relief was denied.

== Geography ==
According to the U.S. Census Bureau, the county has an area of 1,907 square miles (4,940 km^{2}), of which 1,899 square miles (4,920 km^{2}) is land and 7.4 square miles (19 km^{2}) (0.4%) is water. The highest point in the county is Thompson Peak at 10,751 feet (3,277 m), on its eastern border in the Sawtooth Wilderness. The county's lowest point is on the Payette River, on its western border with Gem County, at approximately 2,500 feet (760 m).

The elevated central basin area rises 1,700 feet (520 m) higher than Horseshoe Bend for instance and thus receives significantly more snow during the winter. Star Ranch, Placerville, and Centerville average 4,300 feet (1,310 m) above sea level whereas Horseshoe Bend is 1,700 feet (520 m) lower, Garden Valley is 1,157 feet (355 m) lower, and Idaho City is 400 feet (120 m) lower. Snow volumes around the county are best illustrated by the county Snow Load Map. Placerville roofs must be designed to withstand 150 pounds per square foot of snow whereas Horseshoe Bend is a third of that at 52.

=== Adjacent counties ===
- Valley County - north
- Custer County - east
- Elmore County - south
- Ada County - southwest
- Gem County - northwest

=== National protected areas ===
- Boise National Forest (part)
- Sawtooth National Recreation Area (part)
- Sawtooth Wilderness (part)

=== Major highways ===
- SH-21 - Ponderosa Pine Scenic Byway
- SH-52
- SH-55 - Payette River Scenic Byway

The county's two primary routes are scenic byways. Both are two-lane undivided highways for most of their length. The Ponderosa Pine Scenic Byway on State Highway 21 climbs northeast from Boise to Idaho City and Lowman, and ends at Stanley in Custer County, at the junction with State Highway 75. The Payette River Scenic Byway on State Highway 55 is a designated national scenic byway. It heads north from Eagle to Horseshoe Bend and climbs the whitewater of the Payette River to Cascade and McCall in Valley County, and ends at New Meadows in Adams County, at the junction with US Route 95.

The closest thing to a traffic signal in Boise County is a flashing red light for Highway 52 where it meets Highway 55, in Horseshoe Bend. Highway 55 has a flashing yellow.

- Highway 52 & Highway 55 Horseshoe Bend

== Demographics ==
Historical population
Census	Pop.	Note	%±
1870	3,834		—
1880	3,214		−16.2%
1890	3,342		4.0%
1900	4,174		24.9%
1910	5,250		25.8%
1920	1,822		−65.3%
1930	1,847		1.4%
1940	2,333		26.3%
1950	1,776		−23.9%
1960	1,646		−7.3%
1970	1,763		7.1%
1980	2,999		70.1%
1990	3,509		17.0%
2000	6,670		90.1%
2010	7,028		5.4%
2020	7,610		8.3%
2025 (est.)	8,545		12.3%
US Decennial Census; 1790–1960, 1900–1990, 1990–2000, 2010–2020

=== Racial and ethnic composition ===
Boise County, Idaho – Racial and ethnic composition Note: the US Census treats Hispanic/Latino as an ethnic category. This table excludes Latinos from the racial categories and assigns them to a separate category. Hispanics/Latinos may be of any race.
Race / Ethnicity (NH = Non-Hispanic)	Pop 1980	Pop 1990	Pop 2000	Pop 2010	Pop 2020	% 1980	% 1990	% 2000	% 2010	% 2020
White alone (NH)	2,911	3,372	6,222	6,552	6,751	97.07%	96.10%	93.28%	93.23%	88.71%
Black or African American alone (NH)	1	2	7	13	19	0.03%	0.06%	0.10%	0.18%	0.25%
Native American or Alaska Native alone (NH)	13	35	60	45	55	0.43%	1.00%	0.90%	0.64%	0.72%
Asian alone (NH)	4	14	20	29	36	0.13%	0.40%	0.30%	0.41%	0.47%
Native Hawaiian or Pacific Islander alone (NH)	x	x	3	5	4	x	x	0.04%	0.07%	0.05%
Other race alone (NH)	3	2	14	0	84	0.10%	0.06%	0.21%	0.00%	1.10%
Mixed race or Multiracial (NH)	x	x	116	135	337	x	x	1.74%	1.92%	4.43%
Hispanic or Latino (any race)	67	84	228	249	324	2.23%	2.39%	3.42%	3.54%	4.26%
Total	2,999	3,509	6,670	7,028	7,610	100.00%	100.00%	100.00%	100.00%	100.00%

=== 2020 census ===
As of the 2020 census, the county had a population of 7,610. The median age was 53.9 years. 16.5% of residents were under the age of 18 and 26.7% of residents were 65 years of age or older. For every 100 females there were 109.2 males, and for every 100 females age 18 and over there were 109.1 males.

The racial makeup of the county was 89.9% White, 0.3% Black or African American, 0.9% American Indian and Alaska Native, 0.5% Asian, 0.1% Native Hawaiian and Pacific Islander, 1.9% from some other race, and 6.4% from two or more races. Hispanic or Latino residents of any race comprised 4.3% of the population.

0.0% of residents lived in urban areas, while 100.0% lived in rural areas.

There were 3,364 households in the county, of which 20.6% had children under the age of 18 living with them and 15.5% had a female householder with no spouse or partner present. About 26.5% of all households were made up of individuals and 13.5% had someone living alone who was 65 years of age or older.

There were 5,443 housing units, of which 38.2% were vacant. Among occupied housing units, 85.6% were owner-occupied and 14.4% were renter-occupied. The homeowner vacancy rate was 1.0% and the rental vacancy rate was 10.7%.

=== 2010 census ===
As of the 2010 United States census, there were 7,028 people, 2,974 households, and 2,051 families in the county. The population density was 3.7 inhabitants per square mile (1.4/km^{2}). There were 5,292 housing units at an average density of 2.8 units per square mile (1.1 units/km^{2}). The racial makeup of the county was 95.4% white, 0.8% American Indian, 0.4% Asian, 0.2% black or African American, 0.1% Pacific islander, 0.8% from other races, and 2.3% from two or more races. Those of Hispanic or Latino origin made up 3.5% of the population. In terms of ancestry, 26.0% were German, 17.4% were English, 10.9% were Irish, 8.6% were American, and 6.0% were Scottish.

Of the 2,974 households, 24.6% had children under the age of 18 living with them, 59.5% were married couples living together, 5.6% had a female householder with no husband present, 31.0% were non-families, and 25.3% of all households were made up of individuals. The average household size was 2.35 and the average family size was 2.80. The median age was 48.4 years.

The median income for a household in the county was $48,789 and the median income for a family was $60,042. Males had a median income of $48,676 versus $36,919 for females. The per capita income for the county was $24,288. About 8.9% of families and 16.3% of the population were below the poverty line, including 23.4% of those under age 18 and 9.6% of those age 65 or over.

=== 2000 census ===
As of the 2000 United States census, there were 6,670 people, 2,616 households, and 1,899 families in the county. The population density was 3.5 people per square mile (1.4 people/km^{2}). There were 4,349 housing units at an average density of 2 units per square mile (0.77 units/km^{2}). The racial makeup of the county was 95.23% White, 0.12% Black or African American, 0.93% Native American, 0.30% Asian, 0.10% Pacific Islander, 1.30% from other races, and 2.01% from two or more races. 3.42% of the population were Hispanic or Latino of any race. 18.4% were of German, 14.8% American, 13.8% English and 9.8% Irish ancestry.

There were 2,616 households, out of which 30.70% had children under the age of 18 living with them, 62.50% were married couples living together, 5.80% had a female householder with no husband present, and 27.40% were non-families. 21.80% of all households were made up of individuals, and 6.10% had someone living alone who was 65 years of age or older. The average household size was 2.52 and the average family size was 2.93.

The county population contained 26.90% under the age of 18, 4.70% from 18 to 24, 27.10% from 25 to 44, 30.30% from 45 to 64, and 11.00% who were 65 years of age or older. The median age was 40 years. For every 100 females, there were 105.40 males. For every 100 females age 18 and over, there were 106.30 males.

The median income for a household in the county was $38,651, and the median income for a family was $43,138. Males had a median income of $35,802 versus $26,250 for females. The per capita income for the county was $18,787. About 9.00% of families and 12.90% of the population were below the poverty line, including 16.40% of those under age 18 and 7.70% of those age 65 or over.

=== Population history ===
- 1863 - 16,835 (17,435)
- 1864 - 15,158

== Communities ==
=== Cities ===
- Crouch
- Horseshoe Bend
- Idaho City (county seat)
- Placerville

=== Census-designated places ===
- Banks
- Garden Valley
- Lowman
- Robie Creek

=== Unincorporated communities ===
- Brownlee
- Centerville
- Gardena
- Grandjean
- Grimes Pass
- New Centerville
- Pioneerville
- Quartzburg
- Washington Mill

== Politics ==
Hattie F. Noble was the first woman to represent Boise in 1898, after Idaho had given voting rights to women in 1896.

Like Idaho as a whole, Boise County voters are reliably Republican. In only one national election since 1948 has the county selected the Democratic Party candidate.

United States presidential election results for Boise County, Idaho
Year	Republican		Democratic		Third party(ies)	
Year	No.	%	No.	%	No.	%
1892	377	42.60%	0	0.00%	508	57.40%
1896	226	20.68%	862	78.87%	5	0.46%
1900	695	44.93%	852	55.07%	0	0.00%
1904	1,053	56.31%	639	34.17%	178	9.52%
1908	877	45.51%	862	44.73%	188	9.76%
1912	651	29.38%	743	33.53%	822	37.09%
1916	657	35.84%	1,048	57.17%	128	6.98%
1920	588	61.19%	373	38.81%	0	0.00%
1924	388	43.02%	198	21.95%	316	35.03%
1928	521	56.69%	389	42.33%	9	0.98%
1932	342	32.29%	679	64.12%	38	3.59%
1936	368	30.92%	780	65.55%	42	3.53%
1940	489	41.90%	677	58.01%	1	0.09%
1944	464	45.00%	564	54.70%	3	0.29%
1948	437	46.49%	479	50.96%	24	2.55%
1952	655	67.53%	309	31.86%	6	0.62%
1956	570	66.67%	285	33.33%	0	0.00%
1960	456	51.35%	432	48.65%	0	0.00%
1964	414	47.92%	450	52.08%	0	0.00%
1968	450	55.62%	205	25.34%	154	19.04%
1972	676	66.27%	256	25.10%	88	8.63%
1976	684	58.61%	433	37.10%	50	4.28%
1980	1,134	61.43%	518	28.06%	194	10.51%
1984	1,249	72.57%	436	25.33%	36	2.09%
1988	1,044	61.05%	620	36.26%	46	2.69%
1992	912	39.31%	623	26.85%	785	33.84%
1996	1,576	53.26%	879	29.71%	504	17.03%
2000	2,019	66.09%	745	24.39%	291	9.53%
2004	2,501	70.91%	970	27.50%	56	1.59%
2008	2,433	64.48%	1,240	32.87%	100	2.65%
2012	2,284	66.28%	1,053	30.56%	109	3.16%
2016	2,673	70.08%	777	20.37%	364	9.54%
2020	3,485	72.27%	1,204	24.97%	133	2.76%
2024	3,727	75.91%	1,065	21.69%	118	2.40%

== Education ==
School districts include:

- Basin School District 72
- Boise School District
- Emmett Independent School District 221
- Garden Valley School District 71
- Horseshoe Bend School District 73

Residents are in the area (but not the taxation zone) for College of Western Idaho.

== See also ==
- National Register of Historic Places listings in Boise County, Idaho
