= Glendale High School =

Glendale High School can refer to:

- Glendale High School (Glendale, Arizona)
- Glendale High School (Glendale, California)
- Glendale High School (Missouri), Springfield, Missouri
- Glendale High School (Tillsonburg), Tillsonburg, Ontario
- Glendale Jr/Sr High School, Glendale, Oregon
- Glendale Technology High School, Glendale, New South Wales, Australia

Another school with a similar name:

- Glendale Secondary School, Hamilton, Ontario
