= Fingal, Idaho =

Unincorporated community in Bingham County, Idaho, United States

Final, Idaho
- Unincorporated community
- Location in Idaho Location in the United States
- Coordinates: 42°58′5″N 112°48′35″W
- Country: United States
- State: Idaho
- County: Bingham
- Elevation: 4,403 ft (1,342 m)
- Time zone: UTC-7 (Mountain (MST))
  - Summer (DST): UTC-6 (MDT)
- ZIP Code: 83210
- Area codes: 208, 986
- GNIS feature ID: 396486

Fingal is an unincorporated community in Bingham County, Idaho, United States,

roughly 2 miles (3.2 km) northeast of Aberdeen, east of State Highway 39, and west of American Falls Reservoir.
