= Glendale, Monroe County, Wisconsin =

Glendale, Wisconsin
- Town
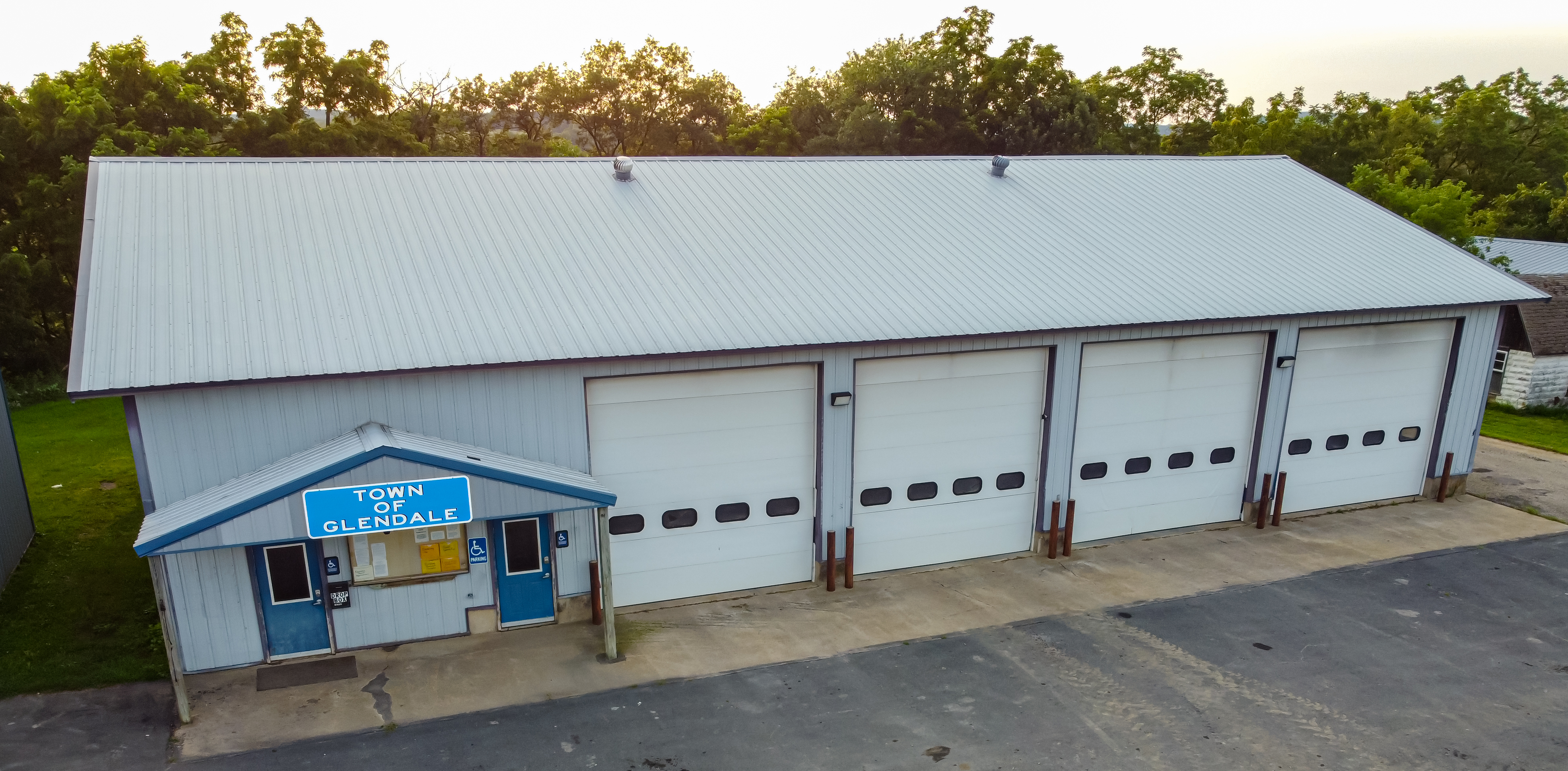
- Town hall

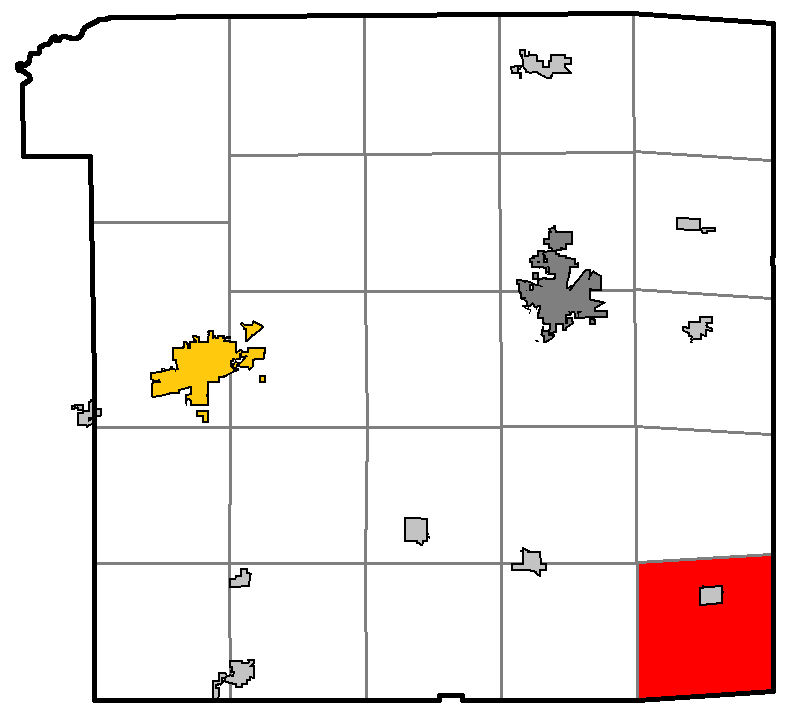
- Location of Glendale, Monroe County, Wisconsin

- Coordinates: 43°46′19″N 90°22′37″W
- Country: United States
- State: Wisconsin
- County: Monroe

Area
  - Total: 35.6 sq mi (92.3 km^{2})
  - Land: 35.6 sq mi (92.3 km^{2})
  - Water: 0 sq mi (0.0 km^{2})
- Elevation: 1,194 ft (364 m)

Population (2020)
  - Total: 663
  - Density: 18.6/sq mi (7.18/km^{2})
- Time zone: UTC-6 (Central (CST))
  - Summer (DST): UTC-5 (CDT)
- Area code: 608
- FIPS code: 55-29450
- GNIS feature ID: 1583282
- Website: https://www.townofglendale.com/

Glendale is a town in Monroe County, Wisconsin, United States. The population was 663 at the 2020 census. The unincorporated community of Glendale is located in the town.

== Geography ==
According to the United States Census Bureau, the town has a total area of 35.7 square miles (92.3 km^{2}), of which 35.6 square miles (92.3 km^{2}) is land and 0.03% is water.

== Demographics ==
As of the census of 2000, there were 579 people, 216 households, and 168 families residing in the town. The population density was 16.2 people per square mile (6.3/km^{2}). There were 250 housing units at an average density of 7.0 per square mile (2.7/km^{2}). The racial makeup of the town was 99.31% White, 0.35% Native American, and 0.35% from two or more races. Hispanic or Latino of any race were 0.17% of the population.

There were 216 households, out of which 33.3% had children under the age of 18 living with them, 71.3% were married couples living together, 2.8% had a female householder with no husband present, and 21.8% were non-families. 18.1% of all households were made up of individuals, and 8.8% had someone living alone who was 65 years of age or older. The average household size was 2.68 and the average family size was 3.05.

In the town, the population was spread out, with 25.9% under the age of 18, 6.2% from 18 to 24, 24.9% from 25 to 44, 26.8% from 45 to 64, and 16.2% who were 65 years of age or older. The median age was 42 years. For every 100 females, there were 113.7 males. For every 100 females age 18 and over, there were 109.3 males.

The median income for a household in the town was $37,083, and the median income for a family was $43,333. Males had a median income of $30,156 versus $20,568 for females. The per capita income for the town was $16,158. About 4.1% of families and 4.6% of the population were below the poverty line, including 6.3% of those under age 18 and none of those age 65 or over.
