= Coltman, Idaho =

Unincorporated community in the state of Idaho, United States

Coordinates: 43°37′04″N 112°00′44″W

Coltman is an unincorporated community in Bonneville County, in the U.S. state of Idaho.

== History ==
A post office called Coltman was established in 1896, and remained in operation until 1906. The community has the name of Edward Coltman, a local postal worker. Coltman's population was 28 in 1909.
