= Thomas, Idaho =

Unincorporated community in Bingham County, Idaho, United States

- Unincorporated community
- Location in Idaho Location in the United States
- Coordinates: 43°10′58″N 112°30′17″W
- Country: United States
- State: Idaho
- County: Bingham
- Elevation: 4,446 ft (1,355 m)
- Time zone: UTC-7 (Mountain (MST))
  - Summer (DST): UTC-6 (MDT)
- ZIP Code: 83221
- Area codes: 208, 986
- GNIS feature ID: 375484

Thomas is an unincorporated community in Bingham County, Idaho, United States, about 1.6 miles (2.6 km) east–southeast of Rockford.
