= Fort Wilson, Idaho =

Unincorporated community in the state of Idaho, United States

- Unincorporated community
- Location within Idaho Location within the United States
- Coordinates: 44°01′45″N 116°50′43″W
- Country: United States
- State: Idaho
- County: Payette
- Elevation: 2,188 ft (667 m)
- Time zone: UTC-7 (Mountain (MST))
  - Summer (DST): UTC-6 (MDT)
- Area codes: 208, 986
- GNIS feature ID: 376155

Fort Wilson is an unincorporated community located in Payette County, Idaho, United States.
