= Blaine, Idaho =

Unincorporated community in Idaho, United States

Coordinates: 46°39′26″N 116°56′56″W

Blaine is an unincorporated community in Latah County, in the U.S. state of Idaho.

== History ==
Blaine contained a post office from 1882 until 1887. The community was originally built up chiefly by Scandinavians.
