= Gardena, Idaho =

Unincorporated community in the state of Idaho, United States

Coordinates: 43°58′33″N 116°11′27″W

Gardena is an unincorporated community located in Boise County, Idaho, United States.

== History ==
Gardena's population was 25 in 1960.
