= Centerville, Idaho =

Unincorporated community in the state of Idaho, United States

Coordinates: 43°54′46″N 115°53′32″W

Centerville is an unincorporated community in Boise County, in the U.S. state of Idaho.

== History ==
Centerville was a mining community named from its location in the center of the Boise Basin. A post office was established as Centreville in 1864, the spelling was changed to Centerville in 1893, and the post office closed in 1952. An early variant name was "Hogum".

Centerville's population was 217 in 1909.
