= Collins, Idaho =

Unincorporated community in Bingham County, Idaho, United States

- Unincorporated community
- Location in Idaho Location in the United States
- Coordinates: 43°12′8″N 112°22′33″W
- Country: United States
- State: Idaho
- County: Bingham
- Elevation: 4,482 ft (1,366 m)
- Time zone: UTC-7 (Mountain (MST))
  - Summer (DST): UTC-6 (MDT)
- ZIP Code: 83221
- Area codes: 208, 986
- GNIS feature ID: 396320

Collins is an unincorporated community in Bingham County, Idaho, United States. Collins is located on U.S. Route 26 immediately west of Blackfort and Interstate 15.
