= Fairview, Power County, Idaho =

Unincorporated community in Power County, Idaho, United States

Fairview
- Unincorporated community
- Location within Idaho Location within the United States
- Coordinates: 42°51′1″N 112°52′10″W
- Country: United States
- State: Idaho
- County: Power
- Elevation: 4,393 ft (1,339 m)
- Time zone: UTC-7 (Mountain (MST))
  - Summer (DST): UTC-6 (MDT)
- ZIP Code: 83211
- Area codes: 208, 986
- GNIS feature ID: 376152

Fairview is an unincorporated community located in Power County, Idaho, United States. It is located near the southern end of the western shore of the American Falls Reservoir, on the eastern edge of Pleasant Valley, and southeast of Idaho State Highway 39.

== History ==
The population of Fairview was 336 in 1925.
