= Clementsville, Idaho =

Unincorporated community in Idaho, U.S.

Coordinates: 43°52′36″N 111°22′12″W

Clementsville is an unincorporated community in Teton County, in the U.S. state of Idaho.

== History ==
A post office called Clementsville was established in 1912, and remained in operation until 1941. The community has the name of the local Clements family.
