= Glendale, Idaho =

Human settlement in United States of America

Coordinates: 42°07′48″N 111°42′18″W

Glendale is an unincorporated community in Franklin County, in the U.S. state of Idaho.

== History ==
A post office called Glendale was established in 1895, and remained in operation until 1904. The community's name is suggestive of topography of the area.

Glendale's population was 30 in 1960.
