= Crouch, Idaho =

- City
- Location of Crouch in Boise County, Idaho.
- Coordinates: 44°06′55″N 115°58′31″W
- Country: United States
- State: Idaho
- County: Boise

Area
  - Total: 0.38 sq mi (0.98 km^{2})
  - Land: 0.36 sq mi (0.93 km^{2})
  - Water: 0.019 sq mi (0.05 km^{2})
- Elevation: 3,114 ft (949 m)

Population (2020)
  - Total: 154
  - Density: 430/sq mi (170/km^{2})
- Time zone: UTC-7 (Mountain (MST))
  - Summer (DST): UTC-6 (MDT)
- ZIP code: 83622
- Area codes: 208, 986
- FIPS code: 16-19720
- GNIS feature ID: 2410268
- Website: cityofcrouch.org

Crouch is a city in Boise County, Idaho, United States. The population was 154 at the 2020 census. It is part of the Boise City–Nampa, Idaho Metropolitan Statistical Area. In 2018, it had multiple commercial businesses for tourists and residents: a small grocery mart, a hardware store, three restaurants, a bar, an outdoor theater, and a community thrift store. At that time, the construction of the Banks/Lowman road 2512A, the "Wildlife Canyon Scenic Byway", transformed a small unpaved road into a paved modern road between Crouch and Lowman. Now it is a fully modern paved roadway with informational and white water rafting pull-outs, which serves to transport tourists, rafters, commuters, and other traffic across the middle Idaho region.

The city was founded in 1934, and then incorporated as a city in 1951 to bring legal alcohol and gambling to the area.

== Geography ==
According to the United States Census Bureau, the city has a total area of 0.44 square miles (1.14 km^{2}), of which, 0.42 square miles (1.09 km^{2}) is land and 0.02 square miles (0.05 km^{2}) is water.

== Demographics ==
Historical population
Census	Pop.	Note	%±
1960	89		—
1970	71		−20.2%
1980	69		−2.8%
1990	75		8.7%
2000	154		105.3%
2010	162		5.2%
2020	154		−4.9%
U.S. Decennial Census

=== 2010 census ===
As of the census of 2010, there were 162 people, 74 households, and 43 families residing in the city. The population density was 385.7 inhabitants per square mile (148.9/km^{2}). There were 90 housing units at an average density of 214.3 per square mile (82.7/km^{2}). The racial makeup of the city was 96.9% White, 1.2% Native American, 0.6% Asian, and 1.2% from two or more races. Hispanic or Latino of any race were 1.9% of the population.

There were 74 households, of which 24.3% had children under the age of 18 living with them, 48.6% were married couples living together, 6.8% had a female householder with no husband present, 2.7% had a male householder with no wife present, and 41.9% were non-families. 32.4% of all households were made up of individuals, and 8.1% had someone living alone who was 65 years of age or older. The average household size was 2.19, and the average family size was 2.81.

The median age in the city was 48.8 years. 21.6% of residents were under the age of 18; 7.4% were between the ages of 18 and 24; 16.7% were from 25 to 44; 37% were from 45 to 64; and 17.3% were 65 years of age or older. The gender makeup of the city was 53.7% male and 46.3% female.

=== 2000 census ===
As of the census of 2000, there were 154 people, 64 households, and 38 families residing in the city. The population density was 366.8 inhabitants per square mile (141.6/km^{2}). There were 83 housing units at an average density of 197.7 per square mile (76.3/km^{2}). The racial makeup of the city was 97.40% White, 0.65% Native American, 0.65% Pacific Islander, 1.30% from other races. Hispanic or Latino of any race were 1.95% of the population.

There were 64 households, out of which 32.8% had children under the age of 18 living with them, 42.2% were married couples living together, 10.9% had a female householder with no husband present, and 39.1% were non-families. 28.1% of all households were made up of individuals, and 9.4% had someone living alone who was 65 years of age or older. The average household size was 2.41, and the average family size was 3.03.

In the city, the population was spread out, with 30.5% under the age of 18, 5.8% from 18 to 24, 23.4% from 25 to 44, 23.4% from 45 to 64, and 16.9% who were 65 years of age or older. The median age was 40 years. For every 100 females, there were 113.9 males. For every 100 females age 18 and over, there were 109.8 males.

The median income for a household in the city was $29,375, and the median income for a family was $32,500. Males had a median income of $26,667 versus $21,875 for females. The per capita income for the city was $17,343. About 18.4% of families and 18.8% of the population were below the poverty line, including 34.5% of those under the age of eighteen and none of those 65 or over.

== Climate ==
This climatic region has large seasonal temperature differences, with warm to hot (and often humid) summers and cold (sometimes severely cold) winters. According to the Köppen Climate Classification system, Crouch has a humid continental climate, abbreviated "Dfb" on climate maps.
