= Bancroft, Idaho =

City in Caribou County, Idaho, United States

- City
- Location of Bancroft in Caribou County, Idaho.
- Coordinates: 42°43′10″N 111°52′40″W
- Country: United States
- State: Idaho
- County: Caribou

Area
  - Total: 0.61 sq mi (1.58 km^{2})
  - Land: 0.61 sq mi (1.58 km^{2})
  - Water: 0 sq mi (0.00 km^{2})
- Elevation: 5,423 ft (1,653 m)

Population (2020)
  - Total: 299
  - Density: 647.2/sq mi (249.87/km^{2})
- Time zone: UTC-7 (Mountain (MST))
  - Summer (DST): UTC-6 (MDT)
- ZIP code: 83217
- Area code: 208
- FIPS code: 16-04420
- GNIS feature ID: 2409780
- Website: www.cityofbancroft.com

Bancroft is a city in the Gem Valley in Caribou County, Idaho, United States. The population was 299 at the 2020 census, and 377 at the 2010 census.

== History ==
The community was named after William H. Bancroft, a railroad official, and is a railroad town along Old Highway 30 (a former routing of U.S. Route 30).

== Geography ==
According to the United States Census Bureau, the city has a total area of 0.65 square miles (1.68 km^{2}), all of it land.

== Demographics ==
Historical population
Census	Pop.	Note	%±
1920	374		—
1930	403		7.8%
1940	406		0.7%
1950	495		21.9%
1960	416		−16.0%
1970	366		−12.0%
1980	505		38.0%
1990	393		−22.2%
2000	382		−2.8%
2010	377		−1.3%
2020	299		−20.7%
2019 (est.)	394		4.5%
U.S. Decennial Census

=== 2010 census ===
As of the census of 2010, there were 377 people, 138 households, and 104 families living in the city. The population density was 580.0 inhabitants per square mile (223.9/km^{2}). There were 163 housing units at an average density of 250.8 per square mile (96.8/km^{2}). The racial makeup of the city was 96.0% White, 0.3% Native American, 0.8% from other races, and 2.9% from two or more races. Hispanic or Latino of any race were 3.2% of the population.

There were 138 households, of which 31.9% had children under the age of 18 living with them, 68.1% were married couples living together, 5.1% had a female householder with no husband present, 2.2% had a male householder with no wife present, and 24.6% were non-families. 21.7% of all households were made up of individuals, and 13.8% had someone living alone who was 65 years of age or older. The average household size was 2.73 and the average family size was 3.24.

The median age in the city was 36.9 years. 30.5% of residents were under the age of 18; 6.6% were between the ages of 18 and 24; 22% were from 25 to 44; 23.1% were from 45 to 64; and 17.8% were 65 years of age or older. The gender makeup of the city was 48.5% male and 51.5% female.

=== 2000 census ===
As of the census of 2000, there were 382 people, 144 households, and 103 families living in the city. The population density was 580.0 inhabitants per square mile (223.9/km^{2}). There were 172 housing units at an average density of 261.2 per square mile (100.8/km^{2}). The racial makeup of the city was 98.69% White, 0.26% African American, 0.52% Native American, 0.52% from other races. Hispanic or Latino of any race were 0.79% of the population.

There were 144 households, out of which 38.2% had children under the age of 18 living with them, 63.9% were married couples living together, 4.9% had a female householder with no husband present, and 27.8% were non-families. 27.1% of all households were made up of individuals, and 18.8% had someone living alone who was 65 years of age or older. The average household size was 2.65 and the average family size was 3.27.

In the city, the population was spread out, with 30.4% under the age of 18, 6.0% from 18 to 24, 22.0% from 25 to 44, 25.4% from 45 to 64, and 16.2% who were 65 years of age or older. The median age was 38 years. For every 100 females, there were 84.5 males. For every 100 females age 18 and over, there were 83.4 males.

The median income for a household in the city was $26,458, and the median income for a family was $43,125. Males had a median income of $46,250 versus $20,750 for females. The per capita income for the city was $12,549. About 9.7% of families and 15.8% of the population were below the poverty line, including 22.3% of those under age 18 and 21.5% of those age 65 or over.

== See also ==
- List of cities in Idaho
