= Mountain Crest High School =

Location
- 255 South 800 East; Hyrum, Utah, U.S. Hyrum, Utah 84319; United States; 41°38′N 111°50′W

Information
- Type: Public
- Established: 1983, 43 years ago
- School district: Cache County School District
- Principal: Denise Mouritsen
- Teaching staff: 61.91 (FTE)
- Grades: 9–12
- Enrollment: 1,554 (2023-2024)
- Student to teacher ratio: 25.10
- Colors: Navy Blue; Orange; White
- Song: We Salute You Mountain Crest
- Athletics: 13 boys sports and 13 girls sports sanctioned by the Utah High School Activities Association (2023-2024 School Year)
- Athletics conference: UHSAA Class 4A Region XI
- Mascot: Mustang
- Rivals: Logan High School (Utah), Sky View High School, Ridgeline High School, Green Canyon High School, Box Elder High School, Highland High School (Utah) (Football), Timpview High School (Football)
- Newspaper: Mountain Crest Express
- Yearbook: Cavalier
- Website: mountaincrest.ccsdut.org

Mountain Crest High School (MCHS) is a four-year public high school in Hyrum, Utah. Established in 1983 as part of the Cache County School District, its campus is in the southeast part of Hyrum, a city in the Southern part of Cache County. Mountain Crest High is currently in the Utah High School Activities Association (UHSAA) class 4A Region 11 and its mascot is a mustang. The school was split for the 2016-2017 school year after the completion of Ridgeline High School; new boundaries were drawn and a portion of the student body and faculty were assigned to the new school. Students residing in the cities and towns of Hyrum, Wellsville, Mendon, Petersboro, Paradise, Avon, and Mount Sterling are within its geographical jurisdiction.

== Academics ==
Mountain Crest incorporates classes from Bridgerland Technical College. These classes are only available to juniors and seniors. In the mornings and afternoons, these classes take up two hours and count as one full class credit instead of the normal .5 credit assigned for classes.

Mountain Crest has a Model United Nations team, which took the top two awards at the Regional High School Model United Nations 2007. Mountain Crest's Scholastic Olympiad team also places in competition every year.

== Athletics ==
Mountain Crest is a member of the Utah High School Activities Association (UHSAA) and competes in Class 4A, Region XI. Starting in the 2023-2024 school year, Mountain Crest will compete in 26 UHSAA-sanctioned sports, thirteen for boys, and thirteen for girls, that are played throughout the year. They are:

Fall sports

- Cross Country Boys & Girls
- Golf Boys
- Football Boys
- Soccer Girls
- Tennis Girls
- Volleyball Girls

Winter sports

- Basketball Boys & Girls
- Competitive Cheer Boys & Girls
- Drill Team Girls
- Swimming Boys & Girls
- Wrestling Boys & Girls

Spring sports

- Baseball Boys
- Golf Girls
- Lacrosse Boys & Girls
- Soccer Boys
- Softball Girls
- Tennis Boys
- Track & Field Boys & Girls
- Volleyball Boys

Football

From 1983 through the end of the 2022 season, the Mustang football team has compiled an overall record of 261-183-0 (.588). This includes a regular season record of 210-153-0 (.579) and a playoff record of 51-30 (.630). Over 40 seasons, Mountain Crest has qualified for the state playoffs 33 times. However, as of the 2019 football season, every team qualifies for the state playoffs. They won the state championship in 1987, 2001 and 2005 and were runners-up in 1991, 1992, 2010, 2012 and 2017. In addition, Mountain Crest has made it to the semi-finals of the state tournament on eight other occasions (1986, 1990, 1994, 2000, 2007, 2008, 2009, and 2022) in which they subsequently did not advance to the final. Mountain Crest has played Sky View High School of Smithfield, Utah every year since Mountain Crest opened. The Mustangs have a 23-19 (.548) record over the Sky View Bobcats, including a state championship victory in 1987.

=== State championships ===
State Championships
Sport	No. of Championships	Year
Baseball	2	1999,2009
Cross Country (Boys)	3	1996,1997,1998
Cross Country (Girls)	9	1990,1992,1998,1999,2005,2006,2008,2012,2014
Football	3	1987,2001,2005
Golf (Boys)	2	1992, 1993
Soccer (Boys)	1	2011
Soccer (Girls)	4	1998,2021,2022,2024
Swimming (Boys)	4	2010,2011,2013,2026
Swimming (Girls)	1	2003
Volleyball (Girls)	3	1986,1995,1998
Wrestling (Boys)	9	2002,2006,2007,2008,2014,2018,2020,2022,2023
Wrestling (Girls)	5	2021,2022,2023,2024,2026
Total	46	

== Notable alumni ==
- Stuart Edge, actor and YouTube personality
- Jake Kuresa, retired NFL player
- Sarah Penn, nurse practitioner and member of the Wyoming House of Representatives
