= Smithfield Tabernacle =

- Smithfield Tabernacle | Youth Center
- U.S. National Register of Historic Places
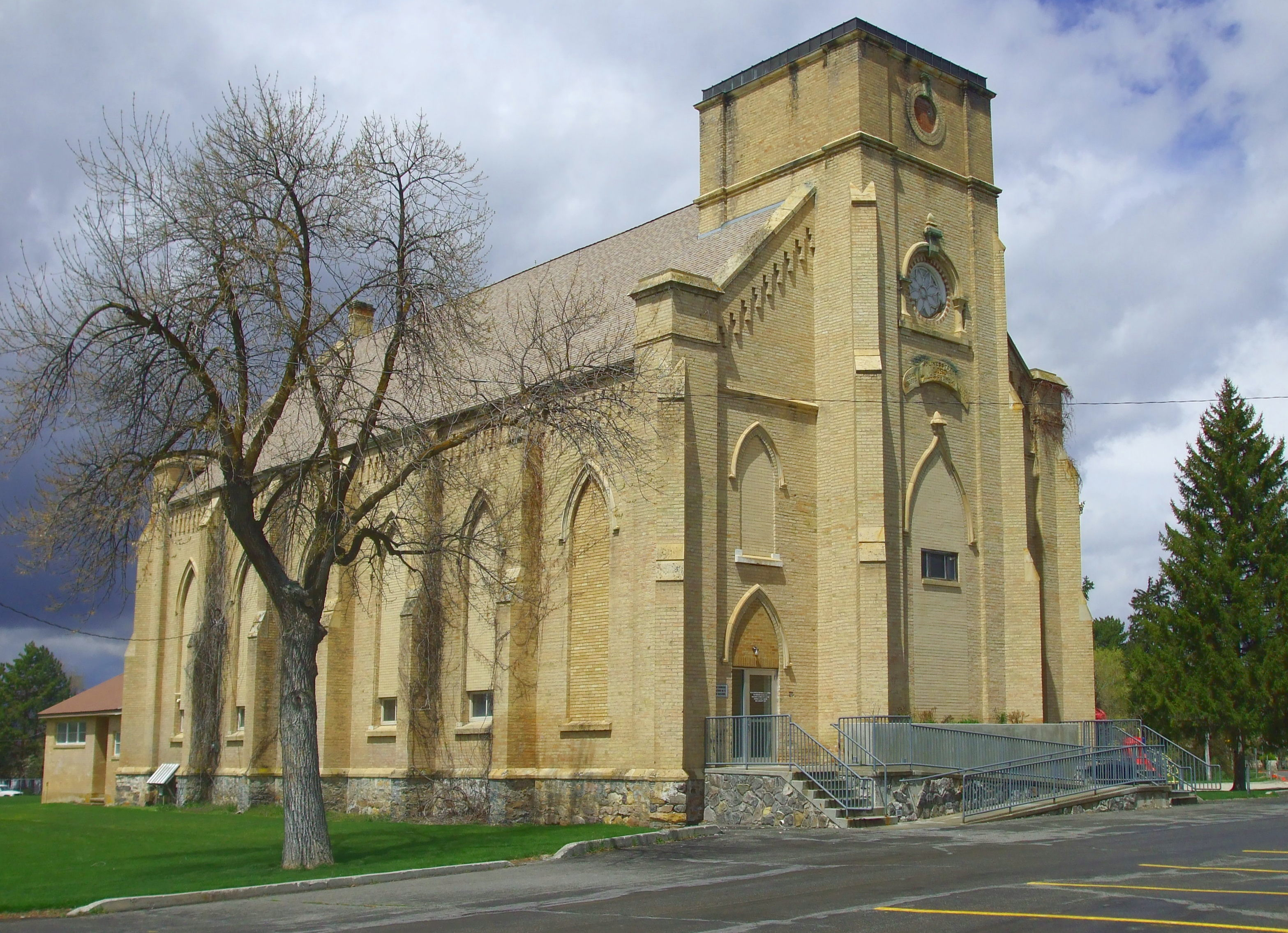
- The façade and south elevation in 2010

- Location within Utah Location within the United States
- Location: 25 N. Main St., Smithfield, Utah
- Coordinates: 41°50′13″N 111°49′59″W
- Built: 1883-1902
- Built by: Smithfield LDS Ward
- Architect: James Quayle
- Engineer: Preston T. Morehead
- Architectural style: Gothic Revival
- NRHP reference No.: 100000509
- Added to NRHP: January 17, 2017

The Smithfield Tabernacle is a historic Church of Jesus Christ of Latter-day Saints (LDS) tabernacle and present-day recreation facility in Smithfield, Utah. It is one of 42 surviving LDS tabernacles out of 92 built. The building was a notable construction for a settlement of Smithfield's size, and it served as a geographic and symbolic center for the early town, functioning as an important religious and public space.

== Architecture & construction ==
Land for a tabernacle was set aside early in 1860 on the town's central square. By 1880, the Smithfield Ward had outgrown the three-room building in which it was meeting, and in 1881, Bishop George L. Farrell and his counselors Preston T. Morehead and James Mack decided the time had come to erect a tabernacle.

The tabernacle was designed in a Victorian Gothic style by Logan resident James Quayle of architecture firm Cannon and Mullen. Preston T. Morehead of the Smithfield Ward bishopric served as the chief engineer, superintending the construction. Morehead may also have collaborated in the design. Unusually for an LDS tabernacle, it was constructed and financed by the small Smithfield Ward rather than being a stake project.

Stone for the foundation was salvaged from the abandoned building site of a nearby church meetinghouse. The building was constructed of approximately 220,000 yellow bricks distinctive to Smithfield and manufactured locally by Lars Mouritsen in his clay-pit brickyard near the Bear River. In some places, the masonry was layered up to seven wythes thick. Construction spanned roughly 20 years. One twenty-first century news report stated the building commenced in 1881, but the tabernacle's own datestone and other early or expert sources indicate it began in April 1883. It was completed in December 1902 at a cost of approximately $77,000, though it had been in use in its partially-completed condition for some years. For example, LDS Church President Wilford Woodruff noted in his diary on 3 August 1890 that he "went to the New Tabernacle & Attended a meeting with the people the House was crouded G Q Cannon spoke 40 Minuts & W Woodruff 38 M[inutes]."

One much later news report suggested the building was finally dedicated in 1906, but the Smithfield Historical Society and the earliest surviving sources indicate the tabernacle was dedicated on 19 February 1905 by LDS apostle Rudger Clawson.

The interior space was dominated by a chapel with an overlooking balcony, but the tower also featured an upper-story prayer circle room. The tabernacle's north and south walls each housed six tall pointed-arch windows with rectangular lights of variegated green. The front elevation included a large central pointed-arch window flanked by a smaller, similar window on either side, below which matching transom windows capped the two sets of entrance doors. Above the central window, the square tower featured the inscription "HOLINESS TO THE LORD L.D.S. CHURCH," a notable deviation from the faith's usual practice of reserving the phrase to mark its temples. Datestones to either side of this inscription mark the construction of the building. A rose window and a second smaller round architectural embellishment (possibly originally a window, but one that had been bricked over long before other windows were covered) appear in the upper half of the square tower. The only architectural voids on the rear elevation were two small doors.

== Tabernacle era ==
After its completion, the building served as the center of religious and civic life in the city, as the setting for both worship services and secular occasions such as musical performances, graduations, and other community meetings. For example, United States Vice President Charles Curtis reportedly visited the tabernacle during a fall 1932 trip to Utah.

As it became partially usable during construction, the Smithfield Ward began holding its meetings in the tabernacle until its first division on 11 November 1906. The Second Ward (congregants living south of Summit Creek) continued meeting in the tabernacle, while the First Ward relocated to a nearby three-room community building, taking with them a small pipe organ that had been in the tabernacle.

From 1910 to 1914, members of the Smithfield Second Ward performed operettas throughout Cache Valley to raise funds for a new pipe organ for the tabernacle. The new instrument was installed in late 1913, and was a point of community pride.

In the 1910s, the Smithfield Sentinel newspaper reported ongoing work to repair lightning damage to the building, particularly to the tower. The cost of repairs amounted to about $100.

Further renovations and repairs took place in December 1928. The roof was partially reshingled, windows were reworked to improve ventilation, and broken panes were replaced. The interior walls and ceiling were repainted, the woodwork cleaned, and a new electric lighting system was installed.

By 1926, ward leaders recognized the tabernacle provided inadequate classroom space and no recreation facilities for the growing congregation. A new Recreation Hall was constructed in 1926-27 slightly south of the tabernacle instead of abutting it, due to the perceived difficulty in harmonizing the two buildings. Regular ward meetings were then held in this new Recreation Hall, with the exception of Sunday sacrament meetings, which continued in the tabernacle. By the 1940s, ward and stake leaders determined the Second Ward had outgrown the Recreation Hall, and that heating the tabernacle for Sunday sacrament meetings during the winter months was a costly undertaking. In January 1949, Second Ward Bishop G. Doane Chambers, with the approval of the Smithfield Stake Presidency and the church's Presiding Bishopric, offered the building and grounds to the City of Smithfield with the stipulation that they be kept in good repair. The deal was never finalized.

In 1951, the Second Ward moved to its newly constructed meetinghouse, marking the end of the tabernacle's use as a house of worship. The building apparently remained unused for some period between 1951 and 16 May 1955, when it was deeded to the Cache County School District, which planned to renovate it as a storage facility and maintenance garage.

== Gymnasium conversion ==
The tabernacle's vacancy following the relocation of the Second Ward attracted some local criticism, particularly among older residents who felt the building was being desecrated by standing unused. The Smithfield Stake Presidency was contacted and visited the tabernacle, after which its members J. Byron Ravsten, Merlin Thatcher "M. T." VanOrden (who was concurrently serving as the mayor of Smithfield from 1953 to 1957), and Samuel Hymas proposed the renovation of the facility into a recreation center. The plan was approved by the Smithfield Stake High Council. The school board agreed to sell the tabernacle back to the church for the nominal sum of US$1, under the stipulation it be used as a recreation facility. (One later source gives the date of this sale as 17 July 1980, but a history written by Smithfield Third Ward members in 1958 to document the recently concluded building remodel indicates the transfer of ownership back to the church had already been completed by that time, and Cache County Recorder plats for 1970 and 1978 confirm the tabernacle was owned by the Smithfield Stake during those years.)

To that end, significant renovations to the building began in 1955. The principal chapel space was remodeled into a 46 by 75 foot recreation floor marked for basketball, volleyball, and shuffleboard. Basketball backboards were added with the removal of the balcony, pews, and rostrum, and the addition of spectator bleachers. The windows were apparently bricked over. The 1913 pipe organ was relocated to the Second Ward meetinghouse (completed 1952). To diminish the building's impression as a religious edifice and to reduce maintenance costs, the spire and four accompanying finials were removed, reducing the square tower to approximately 2/3 of its original height. Pinnacles at each of the building's four corners were also removed, along with decorative caps (possibly modelled after beehives) atop each buttress. The prayer circle room was eventually relegated to storage of elements from either the tabernacle itself or the later-demolished First Ward building, including window pieces and a pulpit.

An annex was added at the rear of the building, blocking two original entrances but adding two new ones. The addition contained shower, locker room, and kitchen facilities to support the new use as a recreation hall. The addition also included an upper-level classroom that was apparently used, at one point, for seminary classes by the nearby Smithfield Junior High (which later became part of Summit Elementary School). A bin-fed stoker was integrated into the heating system, which was updated to feature steam heat. Civic clubs donated a piano and other items.

The renovation and expansion was funded by an assessment paid by the four wards in Smithfield and Amalga, donations from the Clarkston and Newton wards, as well as substantial labor donated by individuals. The total cost of the remodel was approximately "$23,000.00 in cash and labor."

After the completion of these substantial renovations, the tabernacle became alternately known as the Youth Center, and was open for use on weekdays from 4-10 p.m., operating under the supervision of stake officials, and was used for physical education classes by the nearby Summit School and Smithfield Junior High School during the school day.

== City ownership & preservation status ==
In the wake of the 30 August 1962 Cache Valley Earthquake, it was reported the tabernacle had been "badly damaged, and probably should be condemned." (In Richmond, a few miles to the north, the Benson Stake Tabernacle was damaged so badly that it was condemned and ordered razed, while the Cache Stake Tabernacle in Logan sustained only minor damage.) Despite this grim assessment, the tabernacle continued functioning as a recreation center.

In 1985, the building was deeded by the church to the City of Smithfield, in exchange for services possibly including ten years of snow removal service at other church buildings in the city. The Youth Center served as the city's only public recreation facility from 1955 until the construction of a new, large facility at Sky View High School in 2000. Following the construction of the new complex, the Youth Center is still occasionally used as of 2023 for basketball games, public and private events, and as a storage facility for sports equipment.

In 2012, the Smithfield Historical Society launched a renewed effort to draw attention to the tabernacle and accelerate its preservation. The society, citizens, and city officials worked to remove vines from the north side of the building, suppress volunteer trees, install a rain gutter system, and effect repairs to the masonry and foundation. A new furnace was installed inside, along with updates to lighting and restroom fixtures and resurfacing of the recreation floor.

The tabernacle was listed on the National Register of Historic Places in 2017. Around that time, the city commissioned an evaluation of the building, which apparently indicated it was structurally sound.

On the eve of Pioneer Day in July 2018, the community and the Smithfield Historical Society gathered at the tabernacle to officially celebrate its placement on the National Register of Historic Places with a plaque unveiling ceremony. During the event, Historical Society President Jeff Gittins and Mayor Jeff Barnes highlighted future restoration goals, including plans to seek grants through the Utah State Historic Preservation Office to restore features such as the bricked-over windows and potentially replace the building's missing steeple.
