= Cache County School District =

School district in Cache Valley, Utah

Address
- 84 East 2400 North North Logan, Utah, 84341; United States

District information
- Type: Public
- Motto: Educating students for success in a changing world.
- Grades: PK – 12
- Superintendent: Todd McKee
- Governing agency: Utah Department of Education
- Schools: 17 elementary schools; 3 middle schools; 4 high schools; 1 special school
- NCES District ID: 4900120

Students and staff
- Students: 20,279
- Teachers: 1,092

Other information
- Website: www.ccsdut.org

Cache County School District is a school district located in Cache County, Utah, United States. It serves all the communities within Cache County, except most of the city of Logan (which is served by Logan City School District). (Note: Certain Logan City areas that were annexed after the current district boundaries were set are part of the Cache School District) The two school districts share their school bus fleet. Cache is one of 41 school districts within the state and 10th largest in terms of student enrollment.

== Schools ==
The following are schools within the Cache County School District:

=== Elementary schools ===
- Birch Creek Elementary School – Smithfield
- Canyon Elementary School – Hyrum
- Cedar Ridge Elementary School – Hyde Park
- Greenville Elementary School – North Logan
- Heritage Elementary School – Nibley
- Lewiston Elementary School – Lewiston
- Lincoln Elementary School – Hyrum
- Millville Elementary School – Millville
- Mountainside Elementary School – Mendon
- Nibley Elementary School – Nibley
- North Park Elementary School – North Logan (Note: Some schools provide a Logan City address, even though they are actually located within nearby cities.)
- Old Ephraim Elementary School -

Hyde Park

- Providence Elementary School – Providence
- River Heights Elementary School – River Heights
- Spring Creek Elementary School – Providence
- Summit Elementary School – Smithfield
- Sunrise Elementary School – Smithfield
- Wellsville Elementary School – Wellsville
- White Pine Elementary School -Richmond

=== Middle schools ===
- Juniper Ridge Middle School - Hyde Park
- Maple View Middle School - Nibley
- North Cache Middle School – Richmond
- South Cache Middle School – Hyrum

=== High schools ===
- Green Canyon High School – North Logan: Serving North Logan, Hyde Park, Amalga, Newton, Benson, Clarkston, and Cache Junction.
- Mountain Crest High School – Hyrum: Serving Hyrum, Mendon, Petersboro, Wellsville, Mt. Sterling, Paradise, and Avon.
- Ridgeline High School (Note: Ridgeline High School was dedicated on 9 August 2016 and began operations for the 2016–2017 school year.) - Millville: Serving Millville, Nibley, Providence, River Heights, College Ward, and Young Ward.
- Sky View High School – Smithfield: Serving Smithfield, Richmond, Cove, Lewiston, Cornish, and Trenton.

=== Special schools ===
- Cache High School – an alternative education school, Logan

== See also ==
- List of school districts in Utah
- Logan City School District
