= Ridgeline High School (Utah) =

Location
- Millville, Utah 84326; United States
- Coordinates: 41°41′08″N 111°49′49″W

Information
- Type: Public secondary school
- Established: 9 August 2016
- School district: Cache County School District
- Teaching staff: 75.34 (FTE)
- Grades: 9-12
- Enrollment: 1,894 (2024-2025)
- Student to teacher ratio: 25.14
- Colors: light green dark blue Silver
- Yearbook: Accipitor
- Website: www.ccsdut.org/Ridgeline

Ridgeline High School is a high school in Millville, Utah. It is part of Cache County School District.

== History ==
Ridgeline High School was dedicated on 9 August 2016 and began operations for the 2016–2017 school year. The high school came from a divided Mountain Crest High School in Hyrum. It serves the communities of Millville, Nibley, Providence, River Heights, College Ward, and Young Ward.

== Athletics ==
Ridgeline participates in sports sanctioned by the Utah High School Activities Association. The school's nickname is the Riverhawks. The school competes in Region 11 of class 4A. The following sports are offered

- Baseball (boys)
- Basketball (girls & boys)
- Cross Country (girls & boys)
- Football (boys)
- Golf (girls & boys)
- Lacrosse (girls & boys)
- Soccer (girls & boys)
- Softball (girls)
- Swimming (girls & boys)
- Tennis (girls & boys)
- Track & Field (girls & boys)
- Volleyball (girls)
- Wrestling (girls & boys)
- Drill Team (girls)
- Marching Band (girls & boys)
