= Ephraim Utah Temple =

LDS Church temple in Utah

- Dedication scheduled
- Interactive map of Ephraim Utah Temple
- Number: 224
- Dedication: 11 October 2026, by Ronald A. Rasband
- Site: 9.16 acres (3.71 ha)
- Floor area: 41,680 ft^{2} (3,872 m^{2})
- Official website • News & images

Additional information
- Announced: 1 May 2021, by Russell M. Nelson
- Groundbreaking: 27 August 2022, by Russell M. Nelson
- Open house: 2-19 September 2026
- Current president: Thomas Fredrick Bailey
- Location: Ephraim, Utah, United States
- Coordinates: 39°21′49″N 111°34′36″W
- Baptistries: 1
- Ordinance rooms: 4
- Sealing rooms: 3

The Ephraim Utah Temple is a temple of the Church of Jesus Christ of Latter-day Saints awaiting dedication in Ephraim, Utah. It will be the second temple in Sanpete county and the 26th in Utah. The temple was announced by church president Russell M. Nelson on May 1, 2021, with a prerecorded message during a press conference at the Manti Tabernacle.

The temple is 39,000 square feet and is built on a 9.16 acre site. It is three stories tall, with a domed cupola on top of an octagonal tower. The building's exterior has both and arched entrance and windows.

== History ==
Church members first entered the Sanpete valley (where Ephriam is located) in the fall of 1849, establishing the first stake in 1877.

The intent to build the temple was announced by church president Russell M. Nelson May 1, 2021, during a prerecorded video shown at a press conference in the Manti Tabernacle. It is the only temple Nelson announced outside of a general conference.

The groundbreaking took place on August 27, 2022, with attendance by invitation only. Nelson presided at the ceremony and offered the dedicatory prayer. Nelson shared a personal connection to the area, with his mother having been born in Ephraim. Shortly after the prior month's April general conference, Nelson said he received "clear instruction" to build a temple in Ephraim.

Media and other invited guests will tour the building on August 31 and September 1st, with a public open house scheduled for September 2-19, 2026, excluding Sundays. The temple is scheduled for dedication on October 11, 2026, by Ronald A. Rasband of the Quorum of the Twelve Apostles.

The temple is one of four church temples close to a higher education institution, and is ten miles from the Manti Utah Temple, the other in the county. It is anticipated the temple will serve more than 31,000 members, including students at Snow College.

== Architecture ==
The temple is 39,000 square feet, built on a 9.16 acre site. It has a single spire with a domed cupola on top of a multilevel, octagonal tower. The building has large, arched windows, an arched entrance, and is three stories high. The building contains four instruction rooms, three sealing rooms, and a baptistry.

== See also ==
- Comparison of temples (LDS Church)
- List of temples (LDS Church)
- List of temples by geographic region (LDS Church)
- Temple architecture (LDS Church)
