= Ely L.D.S. Stake Tabernacle =

Historic church in Nevada, United States

- Ely L. D. S. Stake Tabernacle
- U.S. National Register of Historic Places
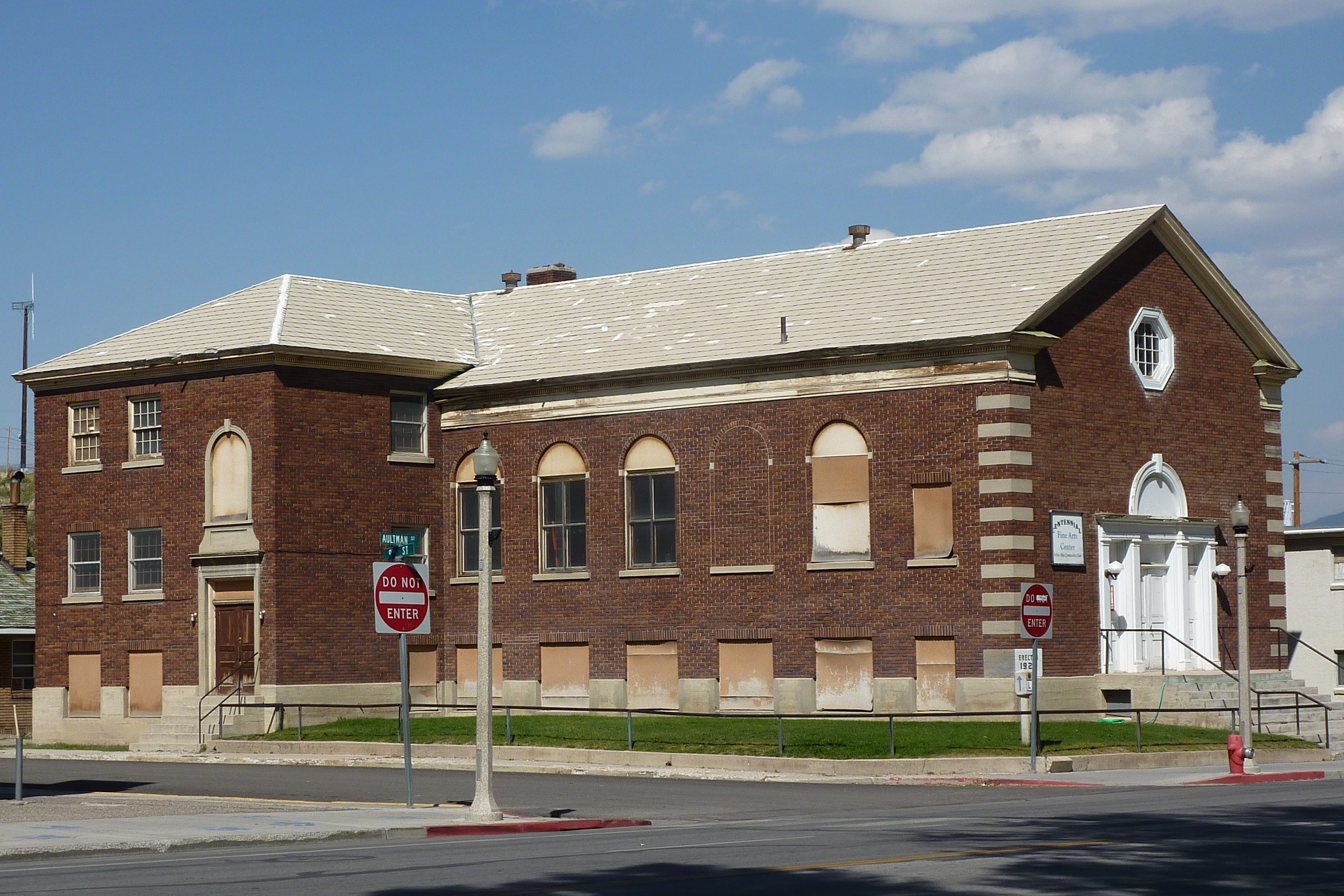

- Location within Nevada Location within the United States
- Location: 900 Aultman St., Ely, Nevada
- Coordinates: 39°14′56″N 114°53′16″W
- Built: 1927
- Architect: Joseph Don Carlos Young
- Architectural style: Colonial Revival
- NRHP reference No.: 93000685
- Added to NRHP: July 29, 1993

The Ely LDS Stake Tabernacle was built by the Church of Jesus Christ of Latter-day Saints (LDS Church) in 1927-1928 as a church and community center in Ely, Nevada. The two-story Colonial Revival building is now owned by White Pine County and is used as a community meeting hall. The contractor for the project was Joseph Don Carlos Young, grandson of Brigham Young.

The stake tabernacle is an unusual example of Colonial Revival design in Nevada, where the style was never widely used. It is also notable as an early example of the expansion of the LDS Church into neighboring states. The LDS church first was established in Ely in 1915. In 1926 the Ely Ward was established. The tabernacle was completed in 1928, containing a 600-seat auditorium, meeting space and classrooms. The facility was replaced by a new meetinghouse in 1957.
