= Green Canyon High School =

Location
- 2960 N. Wolf Pack Way; North Logan, Utah 84341; United States; 41°47′07″N 111°49′44″W

Information
- Type: Public secondary school
- Motto: The strength of the pack is the wolf, and the strength of the wolf is the pack.
- Established: 2017
- School district: Cache County School District
- NCES School ID: 490012001512
- Principal: Jim Crosbie
- Teaching staff: 67.20 (FTE)
- Grades: 9-12
- Age range: 14-19
- Enrollment: 1,677 (2024-2025)
- Student to teacher ratio: 25:1
- Colors: Forest Green; Silver
- Athletics: UHSAA
- Athletics conference: Class 4A Region XI
- Mascot: Wolf
- Nickname: Wolves
- Website: www.ccsdut.org/greencanyon

Green Canyon High School is a high school in North Logan, Utah. It is part of Cache County School District.

Green Canyon first opened in the Fall of 2017 by dividing the student population of Sky View High School to the north. The high school serves the communities of North Logan, Hyde Park, Newton, Clarkston, and Cache Junction. The mascot is/are the wolves with the colors being green and silver. The school was named after Green Canyon just east of North Logan along 1900 North Street. The current principal is Jim Crosbie.
