= Tabernacle (LDS Church) =

Multipurpose religious building in the Church of Jesus Christ of Latter-day Saints

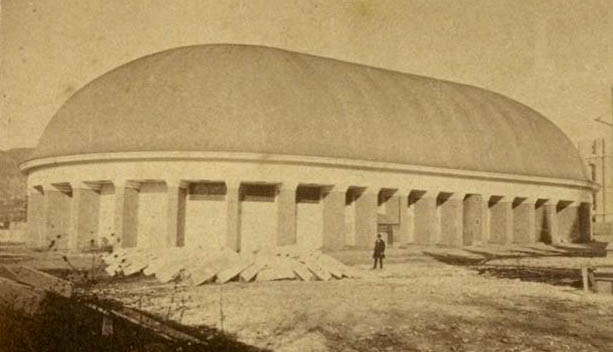
The Salt Lake Tabernacle, home of The Tabernacle Choir at Temple Square ca. 1870

In the Church of Jesus Christ of Latter-day Saints, a tabernacle is a multipurpose religious building, used for church services and conferences, and as community centers. Tabernacles were typically built as endeavors of multiple congregations (termed wards or branches), usually at the stake level. They differ from meetinghouses in scale and differ from temples in purpose.

There were 79 total tabernacles built during the mid-to-late nineteenth and early twentieth century, usually within areas of the Mormon Corridor near the Rocky Mountains in North America that had predominantly Latter-day Saint populations. The largest such tabernacle is in Salt Lake City on Temple Square. The last tabernacle commissioned by the church was the Ogden Stake Tabernacle, built in 1956.

While some tabernacles are still used for a few ecclesiastical and community cultural activities, stake centers are now normally used in their place. Many tabernacles have been demolished, sold, or renovated, with two repurposed into temples (Vernal Utah Temple, Provo City Center Temple).

Prior to 2000, the Salt Lake Tabernacle on Temple Square was used twice a year for the church's general conferences. In April 2000, the conferences moved one block north to the Conference Center.

== Locations ==
- Alpine Stake Tabernacle (1914)
- Assembly Hall
- Bear Lake Stake Tabernacle / Paris Tabernacle
- Beaver Stake Tabernacle (1866)
- Blackfoot Tabernacle
- Blanding Tabernacle
- Brigham City Tabernacle (demolished)
- Bountiful Tabernacle (1863)
- Box Elder Tabernacle (1897)
- Carbon Tabernacle (1914) (demolished)
- Cedar City Tabernacle (1885)
- Ely L.D.S. Stake Tabernacle (1927)
- Garland Utah Stake Tabernacle
- Granite Stake Tabernacle
- Hollywood Stake Tabernacle
- Honolulu Stake Tabernacle
- Kanesville Tabernacle
- Kaysville Tabernacle
- Lehi Tabernacle (1910)
- Logan Tabernacle (1891)
- Malad Tabernacle
- Manti Tabernacle
- Montpelier Tabernacle
- Morgan Stake Tabernacle (1882)
- Moroni Tabernacle (demolished)
- Nebo Stake Tabernacle (demolished)
- Nephi Tabernacle (1860-1949 demolished)
- Ogden Tabernacle (1869)
- Old Salt Lake Tabernacle (1852) (replaced with the Assembly Hall)
- Panguitch Stake Tabernacle (1880)
- Paris Idaho Tabernacle / Bear Lake Stake Tabernacle
- Parowan Tabernacle
- Portland Stake Tabernacle
- Provo Tabernacle (1859)
- Randolph Tabernacle (1914)
- Rexburg Tabernacle
- Richfield (Sevier Stake) Tabernacle
- Salt Lake Tabernacle (1867)
- Smithfield Tabernacle (1902)
- Springville Tabernacle (1855-1892)
- Star Valley Tabernacle (1909)
- St. George Tabernacle (1867)
- Uintah Tabernacle (now the Vernal Utah Temple)
- Summit Stake Tabernacle (1899)
- Wasatch Stake Tabernacle (1889)
- Wayne Stake Tabernacle (1909)
- Weber Stake Tabernacle
- Wellsville Tabernacle
