= Hal Garner =

American football player (born 1962)

No. 99
- Position: Linebacker

Personal information
- Born: January 18, 1962 (age 64); New Iberia, Louisiana, U.S.
- Listed height: 6 ft 4 in (1.93 m)
- Listed weight: 228 lb (103 kg)

Career information
- High school: Logan (Logan, Utah)
- College: Utah State
- NFL draft: 1985: 3rd round, 63rd overall pick

Career history
- Buffalo Bills (1985–1988, 1990–1991)

Career NFL statistics
- Sacks: 1.5
- Stats at Pro Football Reference

Hal E. Garner Jr. (born January 18, 1962) is an American former professional football player who was a linebacker for the Buffalo Bills of the National Football League (NFL). He played college football for the Utah State Aggies before being selected by the Bills in the third round (63rd overall) of the 1985 NFL draft. Garner played for the Buffalo from 1985 to 1988 and 1990 to 1991.

In high school, Garner played on the 1978 State Champion team for Logan High School in Logan, Utah.

In 1992, Hal Garner left pro-football following a variety of injuries and an addiction to pain medication.
