= Heber Amusement Hall =

- U.S. National Register of Historic Places
- Location within Utah Location within the United States
- Location: Bounded by Center, 1st North, Main, and 1st West Sts., Heber City, Utah
- Coordinates: 40°30′32″N 111°24′50″W
- Built: 1908
- Architect: Mr. Watkins
- NRHP reference No.: 70000633
- Added to NRHP: December 2, 1970

The Heber Amusement Hall (also known as the Heber Social Hall) is a community and civic center in Wasatch County, Utah.

== History ==
Built in 1908 from nearby sandstone and mostly by volunteer labor, the amusement hall was inspired by the Apollo Hall in American Fork, Utah, and at the time was one of only a few dance floors that were spring-mounted. A kitchen was added in 1917. The amusement hall, along with the Wasatch Stake Tabernacle, was listed on the National Register of Historic Places on December 2, 1970. It is owned by Heber City and has been used as a senior citizen center. It is currently the home of Timpanogos Valley Theatre and still a major hub of social life in the valley, providing community theater productions and youth productions for large numbers of young locals every year.
