= Sky View High School =

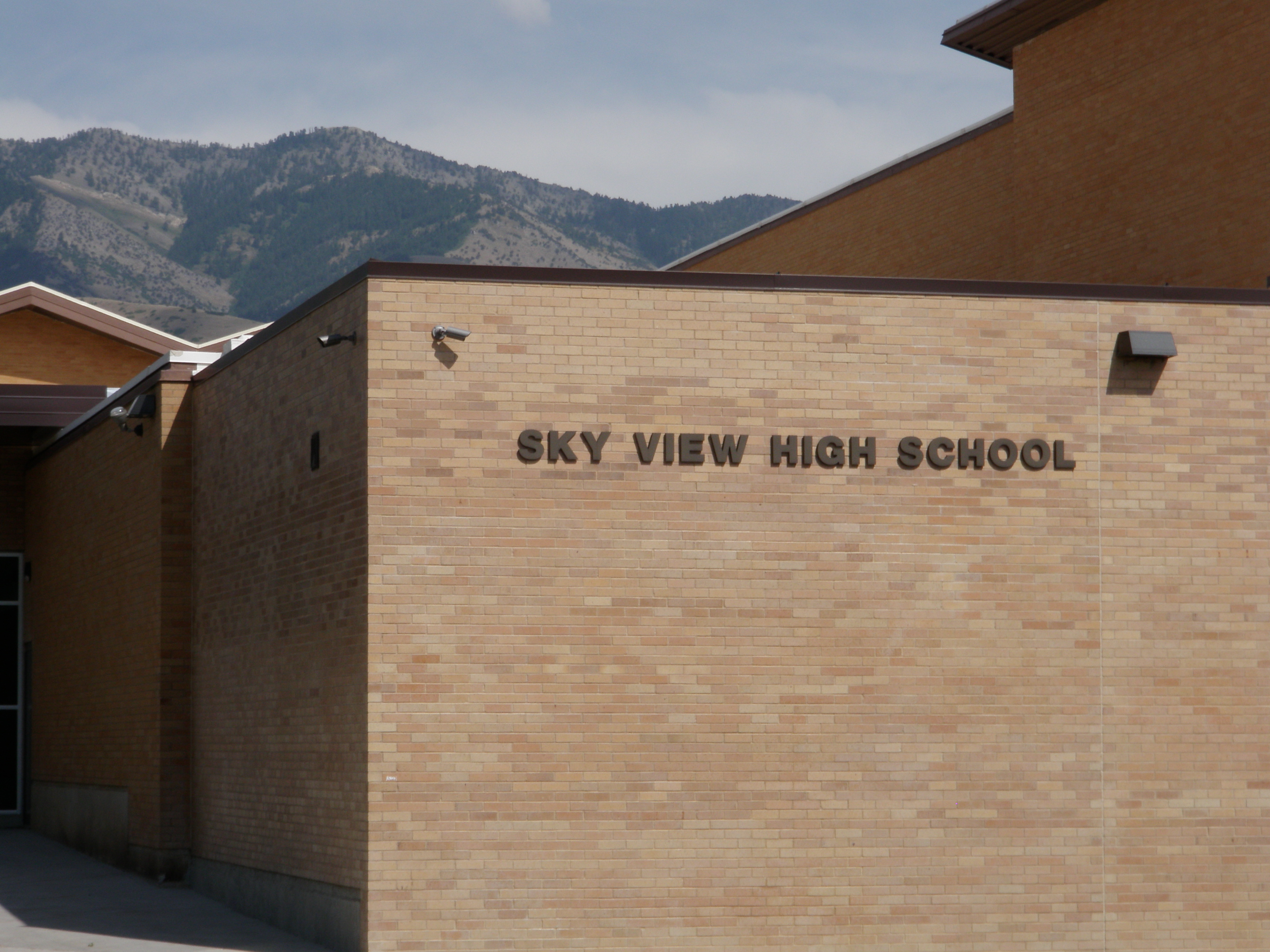
- Home of the Bobcats

Location
- 520 South 250 East; Smithfield, Utah 84335; 41°49′30″N 111°49′30″W

Information
- Type: High school
- Established: 1963
- School district: Cache County School District
- Principal: Shane Jones
- Faculty: 91 members
- Teaching staff: 61.10 (FTE)
- Grades: 9–12
- Enrollment: 1,555 (2023-2024)
- Student to teacher ratio: 25.45
- Colors: Columbia Blue, Gold, White
- Athletics: 2019: 11 boys sports and 11 girls sports
- Athletics conference: Class 4A Region XI
- Mascot: Bobcat
- Nickname: Bobcats
- Newspaper: Catonian
- Yearbook: Aurora
- Website: skyview.ccsdut.org

Sky View High School (SVHS), is located in Smithfield, Utah. Sky View is the northernmost public high school in the state. As part of the Cache County School District, it serves approximately 1,300 students in grades 9 through 12. In addition to serving the students of Smithfield, it also serves students in the neighboring cities of Richmond, Cove, and Lewiston. Sky View is one of five high schools in Cache Valley.

== History ==
Until 1964, the Cache County School District maintained two high schools: North Cache (Richmond) and South Cache (Hyrum). Beginning with the 1964–65 school year, both student bodies were combined at the newly built Sky View in Smithfield. The two former high schools were converted to junior highs, covering grades 7 to 9.

For nineteen years, from 1964 to 1983, Sky View High School served both the northern and southern parts of Cache County. Residents of Logan continued to attend Logan High School, which belonged to the Logan City School District. This meant that students from the southern end of the valley would board a bus, travel as far as ten or fifteen miles to Logan, pass within one block of Logan High School and continue another eight miles to Sky View. After the completion and opening of Mountain Crest High School in Hyrum in 1983, Mountain Crest began accepting the southern part of Cache County while Sky View kept the northern half.

In 2000 a student sued the school in federal court, because of brutal hazing practices by the football team, and was awarded $250,000 in damages.

Sky View won 16 consecutive regional titles in forensics from 1998 to 2014, as well as the state title for 10 consecutive years (2003-2012). However, the regional title record was broken when Roy High School beat them in 2015; Sky View, however, still took the State Championship in 2015.

Sky View's marching band has competed nationally in parade style competitions since the school's inception. In the fall of 1978, the Sky View marching band began competing in field competitions and did not lose until they took second place in the Summer Nationals held in Whitewater, Wisconsin in June 1980. This was after taking first place in the regional competition in Moscow, Idaho. The band reached the Bands of America Regional Championships in 2007, 2008, 2010, and 2011. In 2010, they placed 5th in the western United States at the Bands of America Competition; they placed 7th in the same competition in 2011. In 2014 they took second in the Bands of America competition with their show City Vibes; they received an 87.15.

The school was split for the 2017–2018 school year after the completion of Green Canyon High School, new boundaries were drawn and a portion of the student body and faculty were assigned to the new school. All of the high schools in Cache County also changed their configuration to add ninth grade, with Mountain Crest High School splitting to create Ridgeline High School.

== Students ==
2018-2019 Student Body
Class	Enrollment
Seniors	313
Juniors	329
Sophomores	333
Freshman	396

Student Ethnicity
Caucasian	87%
Hispanic	10%
Asian	1.4%
African American	1%
Other Minority	.6%

== Athletics ==
As of the 2019–2020 school year, Sky View competes in 22 UHSAA-sanctioned sports that are played throughout the year. They are:

Fall Sports

Football; Girls Volleyball; Boys Golf; Boys and Girls Cross Country; Girls Tennis; Girls Soccer;

Winter Sports

Boys Basketball; Girls Basketball; Wrestling; Boys and Girls Swimming; Drill;

Spring Sports

Baseball; Boys Soccer; Boys and Girls Track & Field; Girls Golf; Boys Tennis; Softball; Boys Lacrosse; Girls Lacrosse

=== State championships ===
State Championships
Sport	No. of Championships	Year
Basketball, Boys	4	1994, 2013, 2019, 2023
Basketball, Girls	3	2008, 2015, 2021
Soccer, Boys	3	1994, 2004, 2019
Soccer, Girls	1	2017
Swimming, Girls	4	1997, 2016, 2017, 2021
Track & Field, Boys	1	2011
Track & Field, Girls	2	2009, 2010
Volleyball, Girls	4	1994, 2012, 2018, 2020
Football	2	2019, 2020
Total	24	

== Notable alumni ==
- Kent Baer (1969), college football coach
- Michael Ballam (1969), opera performer
- Craig Jessop (1968), music industry, college administration
- Ike Larsen (2021), college football
- Conner Mantz (2015), professional runner
- Jalen Moore (2013), professional basketball player
- Justin Wilcock (1997), 2004 US Olympic team - diving
- Dell Loy Hansen (1971), businessman and philanthropist
