= Hyde Park, Utah =

City in Utah, United States

- City
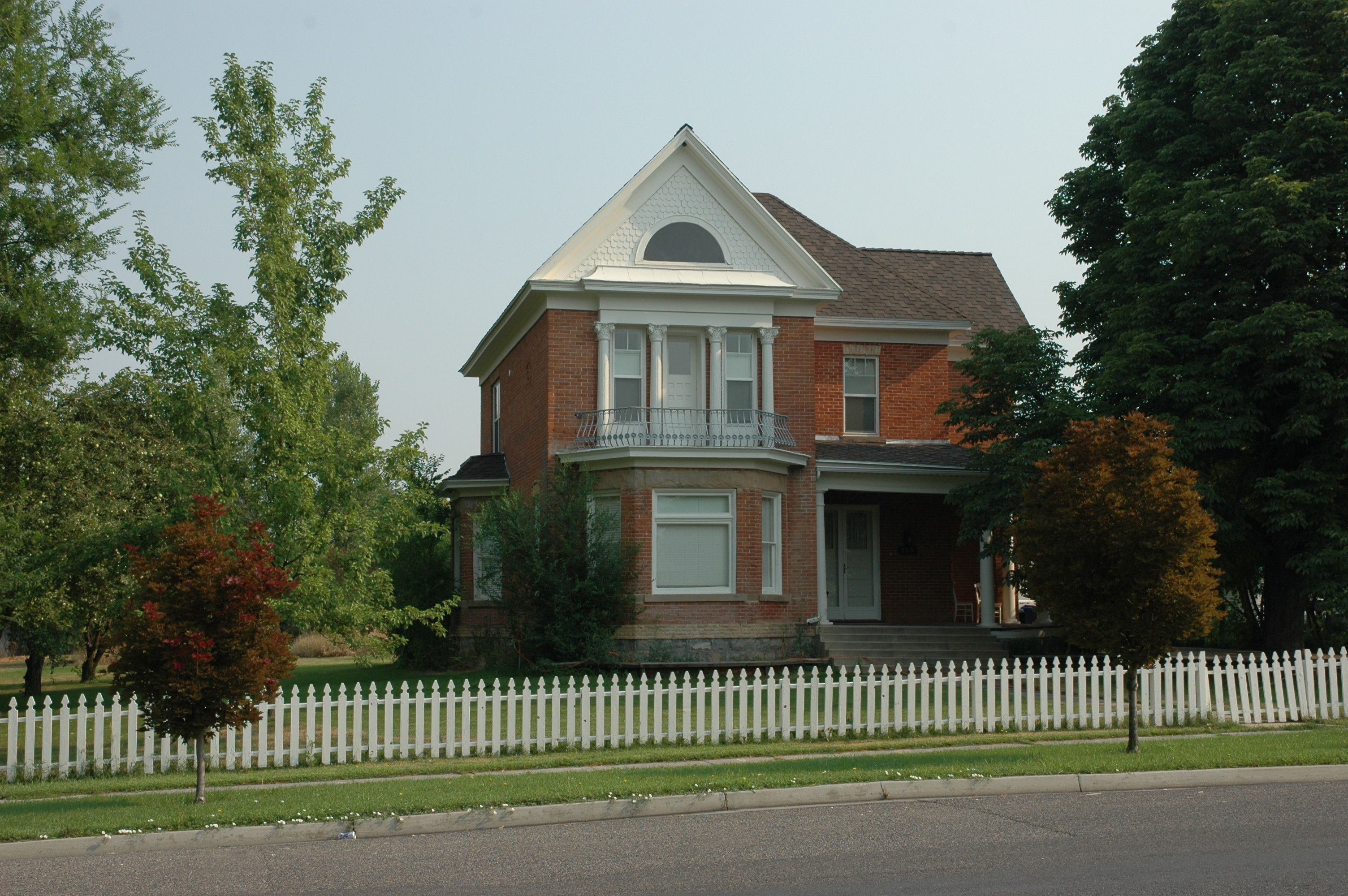
- The John E. Lee House is listed on the National Register of Historic Places.

- Location in Cache County and the state of Utah
- Coordinates: 41°48′04″N 111°48′41″W
- Country: United States
- State: Utah
- County: Cache
- Founded: April 16, 1860
- Incorporated: January 16, 1892
- Named after: William Hyde

Area
  - Total: 4.358 sq mi (11.287 km^{2})
  - Land: 4.358 sq mi (11.287 km^{2})
  - Water: 0 sq mi (0.00 km^{2})
- Elevation: 4,649 ft (1,417 m)

Population (2020)
  - Total: 5,234
  - Estimate (2022): 5,584
  - Density: 1,201.0/sq mi (463.72/km^{2})
- Time zone: UTC-7 (Mountain (MST))
  - Summer (DST): UTC-6 (MDT)
- ZIP code: 84318
- Area code: 435
- FIPS code: 49-37390
- GNIS feature ID: 2410087
- Website: hpcutah.gov

Hyde Park is a city in north-central Cache County, Utah, United States. The population was 5,234 at the 2020 census. It is included in the Logan, Utah-Idaho Metropolitan Statistical Area.

== History ==
The first settlers were Latter-day Saints who moved from Lehi in 1860. Hyde Park was officially organized by Ezra T. Benson on July 1, 1860. The settlement was named in honor of William Hyde, one of the first settlers to arrive in the area on April 23, 1860. The name choice also evoked Hyde Park in London, England which was the homeland of many early settlers. It was at this same meeting that Hyde was also appointed as Bishop of the members of the Church of Jesus Christ of Latter-day Saints in Hyde Park. Hyde served as branch president from 1860–1872 and then as bishop from 1872–1874, when he died.

Hyde Park was surveyed in 1864 and homes on city lots began to replace the earlier fort-style dwellings. The first post office was established on June 15, 1864 and the first town elections were held on September 7, 1864. The first school and church meetings were held in a one-room log structure built in the summer of 1863. As the community grew, church meetings were moved to the new, larger Rock Meeting House constructed in 1866. Early settlers also had to deal with the problem of bringing water to the area for their crops. The first irrigation canal was built in the summer of 1860 and was known as the “Old Ditch.” A second canal known as the Logan-Richmond Canal was constructed in 1865 to help with the increasing demand for water.

In 1874, a census of Hyde Park showed a population of 445 individuals. Hyde Park was incorporated on January 16, 1892 with Charles G. Hyde as president of the board of trustees.

In 1930 the population of Hyde Park was 757.

== Geography ==
Hyde Park is located between the cities of North Logan and Smithfield, approximately five miles north of the county seat, Logan.

According to the United States Census Bureau, in 2019 the city had a total area of 4.358 square miles (11.29 km^{2}), all land.

=== Climate ===
Climate data for Hyde Park, UT (1991-2020 precipitation normals)Elevation: 4,515 feet (1,376 metres). Lat: 41.7844° N Lon: 111.8205° W
Month	Jan	Feb	Mar	Apr	May	Jun	Jul	Aug	Sep	Oct	Nov	Dec	Year
Average precipitation inches	1.74	1.51	1.78	2.58	1.94	1.27	0.53	0.73	1.47	1.76	1.35	1.49	18.15
Average precipitation mm	44	38	45	66	49	32	13	19	37	45	34	38	460
Source: NOAA

== Demographics ==
Historical population
Census	Pop.	Note	%±
1870	343		—
1880	483		40.8%
1890	491		1.7%
1900	619		26.1%
1910	699		12.9%
1920	491		−29.8%
1930	619		26.1%
1940	735		18.7%
1950	644		−12.4%
1960	644		0.0%
1970	1,025		59.2%
1980	1,495		45.9%
1990	2,190		46.5%
2000	2,955		34.9%
2010	3,833		29.7%
2020	5,234		36.6%
2023 (est.)	5,677		8.5%
U.S. Decennial Census

=== 2020 census ===
As of the 2020 census, Hyde Park had a population of 5,234, and the median age was 32.3 years. 35.0% of residents were under the age of 18 and 12.2% of residents were 65 years of age or older.

For every 100 females there were 100.6 males, and for every 100 females age 18 and over there were 98.1 males age 18 and over.

96.0% of residents lived in urban areas, while 4.0% lived in rural areas.

There were 1,437 households in Hyde Park, of which 48.2% had children under the age of 18 living in them. Of all households, 80.3% were married-couple households, 6.5% were households with a male householder and no spouse or partner present, and 12.1% were households with a female householder and no spouse or partner present. About 11.3% of all households were made up of individuals and 6.4% had someone living alone who was 65 years of age or older.

There were 1,475 housing units, of which 2.6% were vacant. The homeowner vacancy rate was 0.7% and the rental vacancy rate was 3.3%.

Racial composition as of the 2020 census
Race	Number	Percent
White	4,785	91.4%
Black or African American	19	0.4%
American Indian and Alaska Native	8	0.2%
Asian	56	1.1%
Native Hawaiian and Other Pacific Islander	5	0.1%
Some other race	104	2.0%
Two or more races	257	4.9%
Hispanic or Latino (of any race)	325	6.2%

=== 2000 census ===
As of the census of 2000, there were 2,955 people, 763 households, and 678 families residing in the city. The population density was 923.5 people per square mile (356.5/km^{2}). There were 779 housing units at an average density of 243.4 per square mile (94.0/km^{2}). The racial makeup of the city was 98.00% White, 0.14% African American, 0.07% Native American, 0.37% Asian, 0.10% Pacific Islander, 0.47% from other races, and 0.85% from two or more races. Hispanic or Latino of any race were 1.59% of the population.

There were 763 households, out of which 60.3% had children under the age of 18 living with them, 81.3% were married couples living together, 6.0% had a female householder with no husband present, and 11.1% were non-families. 9.8% of all households were made up of individuals, and 5.1% had someone living alone who was 65 years of age or older. The average household size was 3.87 and the average family size was 4.18.

In the city, the population was spread out, with 40.3% under the age of 18, 11.5% from 18 to 24, 25.1% from 25 to 44, 17.5% from 45 to 64, and 5.5% who were 65 years of age or older. The median age was 24 years. For every 100 females there were 101.7 males. For every 100 females age 18 and over, there were 95.2 males.

The median income for a household in the city was $51,750, and the median income for a family was $54,545. Males had a median income of $42,868 versus $25,000 for females. The per capita income for the city was $15,487. About 3.7% of families and 3.4% of the population were below the poverty line, including 3.0% of those under age 18 and 5.9% of those age 65 or over.

== Notable persons ==
- John William Woolf, served in the Legislative Assembly of the Northwest Territories and Legislative Assembly of Alberta.

== See also ==
- List of cities and towns in Utah
