= Pumpkin Walk =

Annual public event in Utah

The Pumpkin Walk is a free, public event held annually in October in North Logan, Utah. The Pumpkin Walk features displays created from hundreds of pumpkins by North Logan residents, and the shared theme of these displays changes from year to year.

The first Pumpkin Walk took place in North Logan resident Ida Beutler's backyard in 1983, and was already drawing 20,000 visitors by 1987. By 2013, that number had grown to more than 60,000.

== History ==
Retired teacher Ida Beutler hosted the first version of the Pumpkin Walk on her farm during the Halloween of 1983. This first version was quite simple, just using a few pumpkins to create cheerful Halloween figures. A few young boys from the neighborhood vandalized the display, but Beutler offered them treats instead of getting angry about the destruction, and she arranged for them to help her with another display the following year.

In 1984, the same boys helped her make the display bigger, and Beutler also brought in her own family, friends, and neighbors to help create more displays and pass out treats to guests. One friend, artist Nancy Israelsen, became a co-organizer for the event; Israelsen, her husband Lyle, and Beutler's husband Wallace ("Wally") continued to work on the pumpkin displays of the newly inaugurated Pumpkin Walk for several years. Beutler's neighbors also supported the event by helping the Beutler family harvest pumpkins, by making and serving refreshments, and by creating the pumpkin-based scenes that had made the first Pumpkin Walk so popular.

By 1989, six years after the inaugural event, the Pumpkin Walk had outgrown both the Beutler farm and the Beutlers' volunteer efforts, especially with thousands of guests now coming from across the Wasatch Front and neighboring states such as Idaho. Beutler agreed to let the city of North Logan run the Pumpkin Walk, so long as the event would always remain free to the public and wouldn't use advertising; the city agreed to her conditions and the event has continued since, moving to Elk Ridge Park in 1992 and quickly becoming an even more popular Cache Valley tradition.

North Logan residents and event visitors have shared many photographs and memories from past Pumpkin Walks.

== Today ==
Over 30 years after its founding, the Pumpkin Walk regularly draws more than 30,000 visitors during its five-day run time. Hundreds of volunteers, from pumpkin carvers and painters to electricians and handymen, participate in helping create the event each year and there are many ways to get involved.

The 2020 Pumpkin Walk was a "Lite" version due to the COVID-19 pandemic. According to organizers, some photo opportunities were not offered for safety reasons; likewise, the usual treats and refreshments were not handed out. However, the famous pumpkin scenes were still there.

== Displays ==
The pumpkin displays at the Pumpkin Walk use pumpkins that have been carved, painted, and left whole. Displays may be inspired by the autumn season and Halloween holiday, by popular books and movies such as Alice in Wonderland and Mary Poppins, or by the theme chosen for that particular year.

Each year, event organizers pick a special theme for the next Pumpkin Walk. Volunteer pumpkin painters and carvers are encouraged to work with the year's theme, but creativity is always encouraged.

Year	Theme
1996	Tales from the Patch
1997	Somewhere in Pumpkin Time
1998	The Hills are Alive with the Sound of Pumpkins
1999	Blast from TV Past
2000	See You in the Funnies
2001	Go for the Orange
2002	Tell Me a Story
2003	The Best of 20 Years
2004	Once Upon a Vine
2005	Comedy Central
2006	Musical Tour
2007	Then and Now
2008	Calling All Heroes
2009	And Now, a Word from our Sponsors
2010	The Magic of Animation
2011	My Favorite Things
2012	Let the Games Begin
2013	A Walk to Remember
2014	It's a Classic
2015	Now, that's Funny!
2016	American Icons
2017	It's About Time
2018	Where In The World
2019	Imagine That
2020	Enchanted Wonders
2021	Characters and Crowns
2022	SF Out of This World
2023	There's No Place Like the Pumpkin Walk
