= Logan City School District =

School district in Utah, United States

Address
- 101 West Center Street Logan, Utah, 84341; United States

District information
- Type: Public
- Grades: PK - 12
- Superintendent: Frank Schofield
- Governing agency: Utah Department of Education
- Schools: 2 preschools; 6 elementary schools; 1 middle school; 1 high school
- NCES District ID: 4900510

Students and staff
- Students: 6,063
- Teachers: 263

Other information
- Website: www.loganschools.org

Logan City School District is a school district located in Logan, Utah, United States. As its name indicates, it serves most of the city of Logan (while the Cache County School District serves surrounding communities within Cache County). (Note: Some schools within the Cache County School District provide a Logan City address, even though they are actually located within nearby cities.) (Note: The Logan City School District busing is provided by the Cache County School District transportation, but the buses are labeled with the names of both districts.) It is one of 41 school districts within the state and 24th largest in terms of student enrollment.

== Schools ==
The following are schools within the Logan City School District:

=== Preschools ===
- Early Childhood Center
- Riverside School

=== Elementary schools ===
- Adams Elementary School
- Bridger Elementary School
- Ellis Elementary School
- Hillcrest Elementary School
- Wilson Elementary School
- Woodruff Elementary School

=== Middle schools ===
- Mount Logan Middle School

=== High schools ===
- Logan High School

== See also ==
- List of school districts in Utah
- Cache County School District
