= Stuart Edge =

YouTube personality

- Born: Stuart Edgington; March 27, 1989 (age 36); Utah, US
- Education: Mountain Crest High School; Utah Valley University
- Occupations: Actor, magician, musician, writer, entertainer
- Years active: 2012–present
- Relatives: Steven Edge (Brother); Spencer Edge (Brother)

YouTube information
- Channels: Stuart Edge; Stuart EdgeXtra

Stuart Edgington, known as Stuart Edge, is an American actor and entertainer best known for his internet videos. Stuart has been featured as a performer on Late Night with Jimmy Fallon and EXTRA with Mario Lopez and Maria Menounos. In 2018, Stuart played John Brooke in the movie "Little Women".

== Early life ==
Edge was born on March 27, 1989, in Utah. He is a member of the Church of Jesus Christ of Latter-day Saints. When he was 14 his parents divorced and he moved to Mexico with his mother and brothers. He graduated with an associate degree from Utah Valley University.

Edge wrote about his early life and career in his book "On the Edge: How My Crappy Job Changed My Life".

== YouTube ==
=== "Using Siri To Get A Date/Married" ===
Two years after the initial release of Siri, Edge came up with the idea to team up with his friends to do it again. The first video titled "Using Siri To Get A Date" was released on October 23, 2013, and the second video titled "Using Siri To Get Married" was released on September 16, 2015.

=== Justin Bieber Sorry Dance Video ===
Edge made a video with his partner Weixin Le where they dance to Justin Bieber's Sorry song in 31 different Halloween costumes. The video was released on October 30, 2015, and received so much attention that Justin Bieber tweeted a link to the video.

=== "Deserving Family Gets Christmas Makeover" ===
Edge is involved with Day 8 in the Church of Jesus Christ of Latter-day Saints' 12 Days of Social where they asked 12 YouTubers to share their talents to spread the message of Jesus Christ. The series took place from December 1 to December 12, 2015, and featured Alex Boyé, Jenny Oaks Baker, Lexi Walker and the Gardiner Sisters.

Edge teamed up with his family, friends, and local businesses to provide a Christmas for a family whose father died unexpectedly one year before the campaign.

=== "World's Strongest Kid" ===
Edge teamed up with Make-A-Wish Foundation to help a kid named Beckham film a prank.

== Mexico Veracruz Mission ==
Edge as a part of the Church of Jesus Christ of Latter-day Saints has served a mission from 2008 to 2010 in Veracruz, Mexico. Edge can speak Spanish fluently.
