= North Logan, Utah =

City in Utah, United States

- City
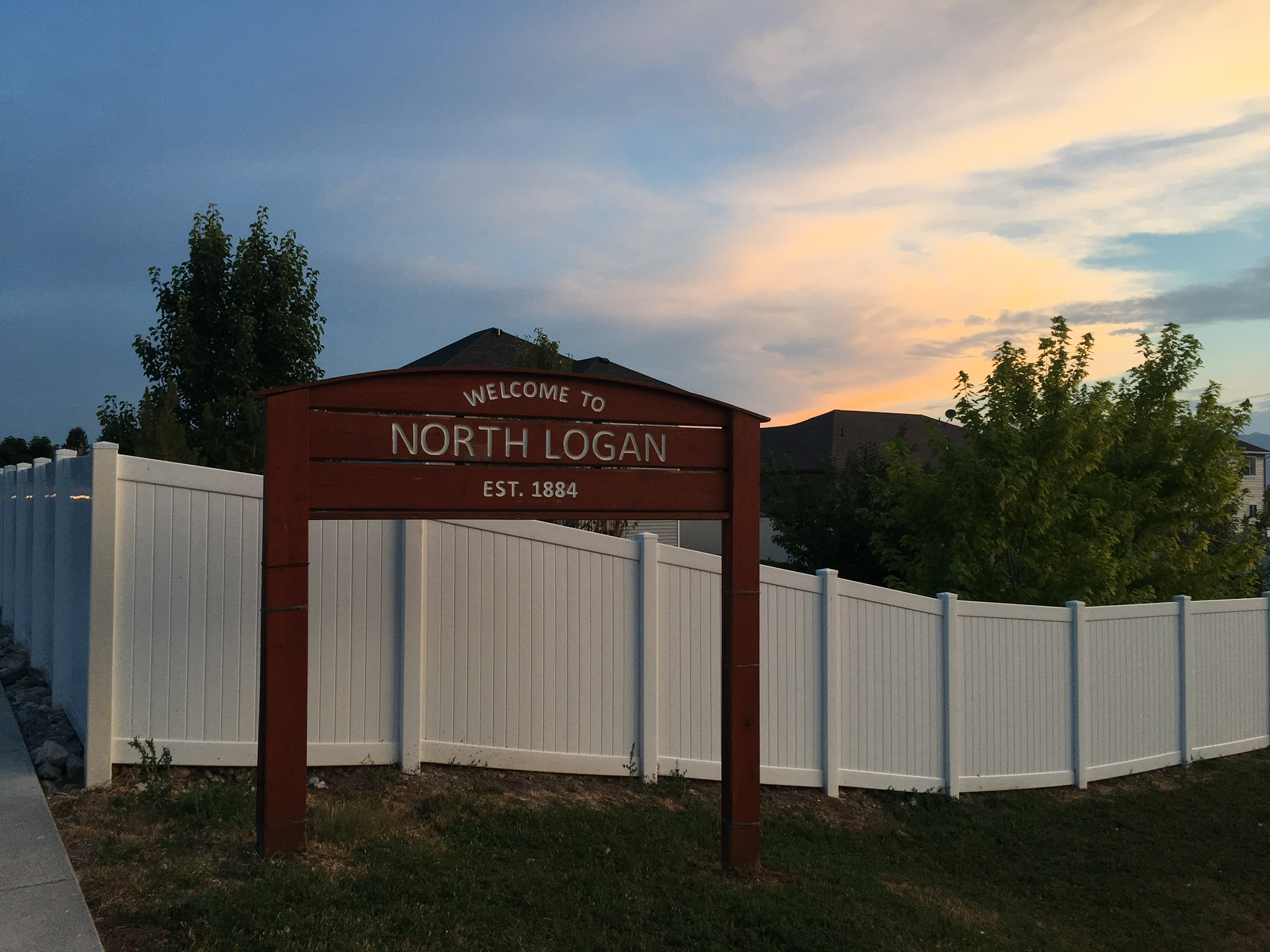

- Location in Cache County and the state of Utah.
- Coordinates: 41°46′33″N 111°48′24″W
- Country: United States
- State: Utah
- County: Cache
- Settled: 1890
- Incorporated: 1934
- Founder: Ralph Smith
- Named for: Logan River

Government
  - Type: Mayor/Council

Area
  - Total: 7.14 sq mi (18.49 km^{2})
  - Land: 7.13 sq mi (18.47 km^{2})
  - Water: 0.0077 sq mi (0.02 km^{2})
- Elevation: 4,649 ft (1,417 m)

Population (2020)
  - Total: 10,986
  - Density: 1,575.6/sq mi (608.36/km^{2})
- Time zone: UTC-7 (Mountain (MST))
  - Summer (DST): UTC-6 (MDT)
- ZIP code: 84341
- Area code: 435
- FIPS code: 49-54990
- GNIS feature ID: 2411274
- Website: northlogancity.gov

North Logan is a city in Cache County, Utah, United States. The population was 10,986 at the 2020 census. It is included in the Logan, Utah-Idaho (partial) Metropolitan Statistical Area. The city is mainly composed of residential sub-divisions and is a suburb of the county seat, Logan. The city has an annual event every year in October called the Pumpkin Walk.

North Logan was first settled in 1890.

== Geography ==
According to the United States Census Bureau, the city has a total area of 6.9 square miles (17.9 km^{2}), of which 6.9 square miles (17.9 km^{2}) is land and 0.14% is water.

On the west, North Logan has views of the Wellsville Mountains. To the east of North Logan is the Mt. Naomi Wilderness.

== Government ==
The Mayor of North Logan is Lyndsay Peterson. The City Council includes Buzzy Mullakhel, Emily Schmidt, Joni Kartchner, Kenneth Reese, and Mark Hancey (as of 2025). The city elects its council members at large, rather than through a district system.

== Demographics ==
Historical population
Census	Pop.	Note	%±
1940	423		—
1950	535		26.5%
1960	741		38.5%
1970	1,405		89.6%
1980	2,258		60.7%
1990	3,768		66.9%
2000	6,163		63.6%
2010	8,269		34.2%
2020	10,986		32.9%
U.S. Decennial Census

=== 2020 census ===
As of the 2020 census, North Logan had a population of 10,986. The median age was 29.7 years. 29.8% of residents were under the age of 18 and 13.4% of residents were 65 years of age or older. For every 100 females there were 99.1 males, and for every 100 females age 18 and over there were 98.4 males age 18 and over.

95.8% of residents lived in urban areas, while 4.2% lived in rural areas.

There were 3,575 households in North Logan, of which 38.1% had children under the age of 18 living in them. Of all households, 61.7% were married-couple households, 15.0% were households with a male householder and no spouse or partner present, and 20.2% were households with a female householder and no spouse or partner present. About 19.8% of all households were made up of individuals and 9.0% had someone living alone who was 65 years of age or older.

There were 3,797 housing units, of which 5.8% were vacant. The homeowner vacancy rate was 1.3% and the rental vacancy rate was 8.7%.

Racial composition as of the 2020 census
Race	Number	Percent
White	9,278	84.5%
Black or African American	71	0.6%
American Indian and Alaska Native	71	0.6%
Asian	326	3.0%
Native Hawaiian and Other Pacific Islander	50	0.5%
Some other race	462	4.2%
Two or more races	728	6.6%
Hispanic or Latino (of any race)	1,145	10.4%

=== 2000 census ===
At the 2000 census there were 6,163 people in 1,728 households, including 1,461 families, in the city. The population density was 891.0 inhabitants per square mile (344.0/km^{2}). There were 1,778 housing units at an average density of 257.1 per square mile (99.3/km^{2}). The racial makeup of the city was 94.35% White, 0.49% African American, 0.28% Native American, 2.01% Asian, 0.13% Pacific Islander, 1.38% from other races, and 1.36% from two or more races. Hispanic or Latino of any race were 3.60%.

Of the 1,728 households 52.5% had children under the age of 18 living with them, 73.0% were married couples living together, 8.9% had a female householder with no husband present, and 15.4% were non-families. 8.9% of households were one person and 2.5% were one person aged 65 or older. The average household size was 3.56 and the average family size was 3.84.

The age distribution was 37.4% under the age of 18, 14.3% from 18 to 24, 27.3% from 25 to 44, 15.3% from 45 to 64, and 5.7% 65 or older. The median age was 24 years. For every 100 females, there were 103.3 males. For every 100 females age 18 and over, there were 97.2 males.

The median household income was $49,154 and the median family income was $51,573. Males had a median income of $40,302 versus $25,461 for females. The per capita income for the city was $17,491. About 4.0% of families and 6.0% of the population were below the poverty line, including 7.4% of those under age 18 and none of those age 65 or over.

== Education ==
North Logan is home to Green Canyon High School which is part of Cache County School District. It is also home to Thomas Edison Charter School a 2nd - 8th Grade Charter school.
