= Wasatch Stake Tabernacle =

Historic church in Utah, United States

- U.S. National Register of Historic Places
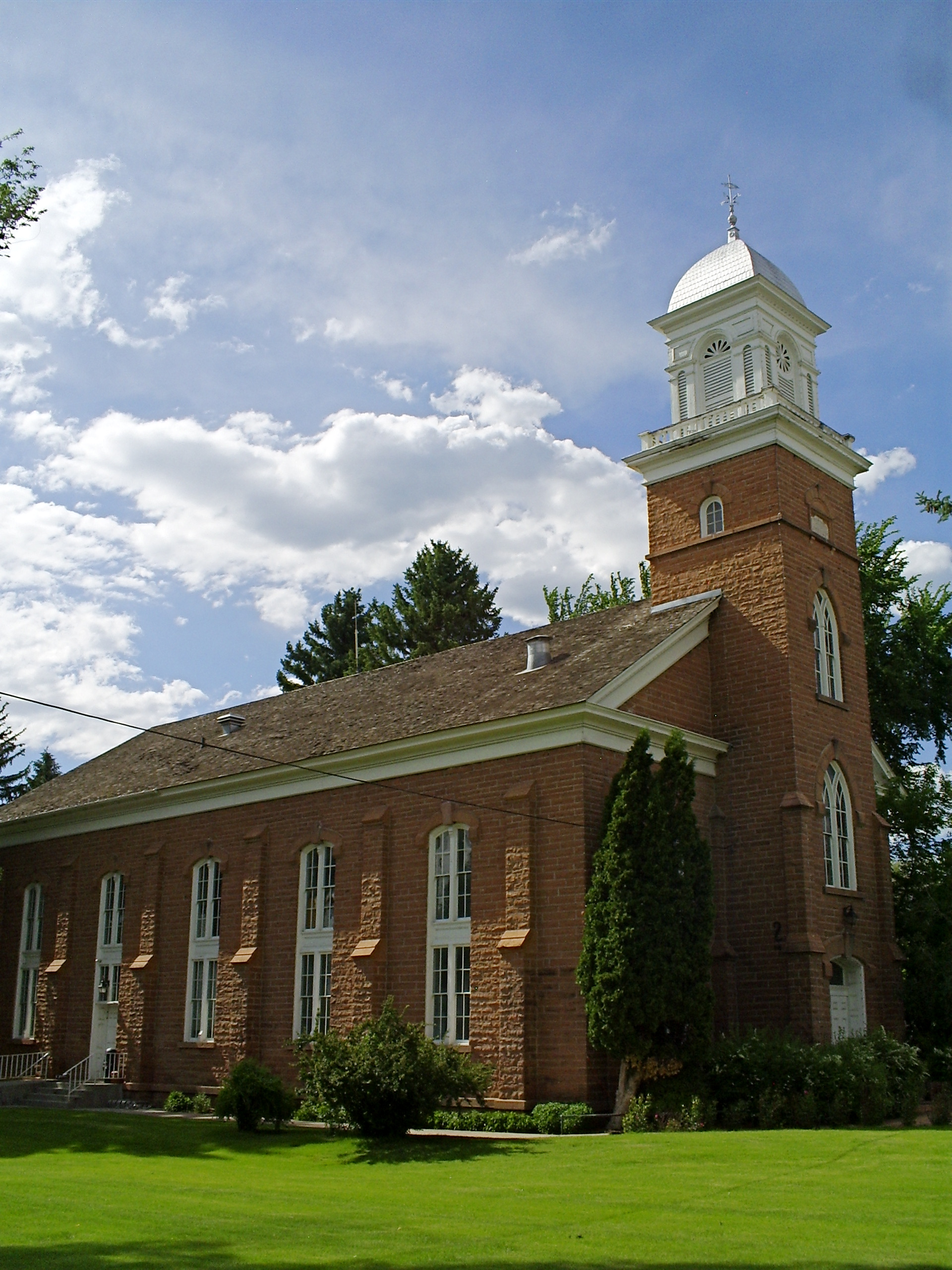

- Location within Utah Location within the United States
- Location: Bounded by Center, 1st North, Main, and 1st West Sts., Heber City, Utah
- Coordinates: 40°30′32″N 111°24′50″W
- Built: 1889
- Architect: Alex Fortie
- NRHP reference No.: 70000633
- Added to NRHP: December 2, 1970

The Wasatch Stake Tabernacle in Heber City, Wasatch County, Utah, USA was completed in 1889, and served as a Latter Day Saints meetinghouse reserved for especially large congregations until 1965. The tabernacle, which has a capacity of 1,500 in its pews, was added to the National Register of Historic Places in a joint listing with the adjacent Heber Amusement Hall on December 2, 1970.

Construction began in 1887 and the dedication of the completed building occurred on May 5, 1889 where it was reported that the building costs of the tabernacle were $30,000. Then President of the Wasatch Stake, Abram Hatch was superintendent of the building project and Alexander Fortie the architect. The tabernacle is built with red sandstone that was quarried from the Lake Creek area east of Heber. Originally, the tabernacle was heated by four potbelly stoves, one in each corner. Additions were made in 1928 and 1954. In 1980 the tabernacle was sold to Heber City and now functions as a community hall.

== Interior ==
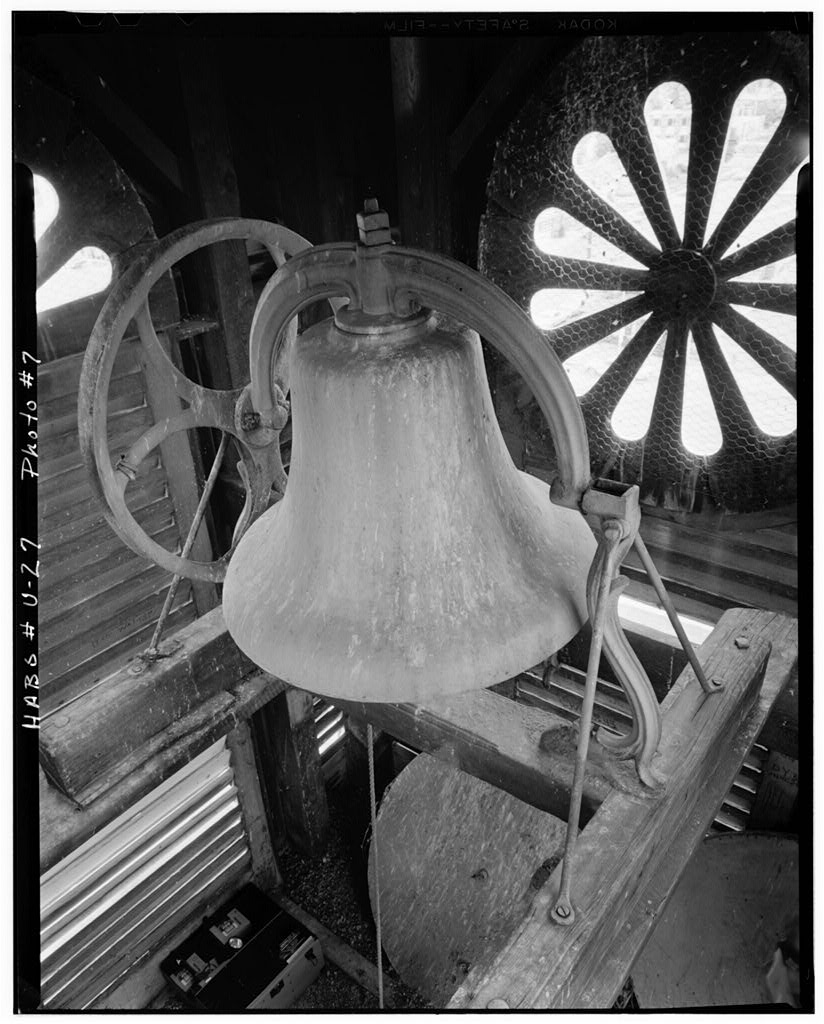
Inside the Belfry (1967)

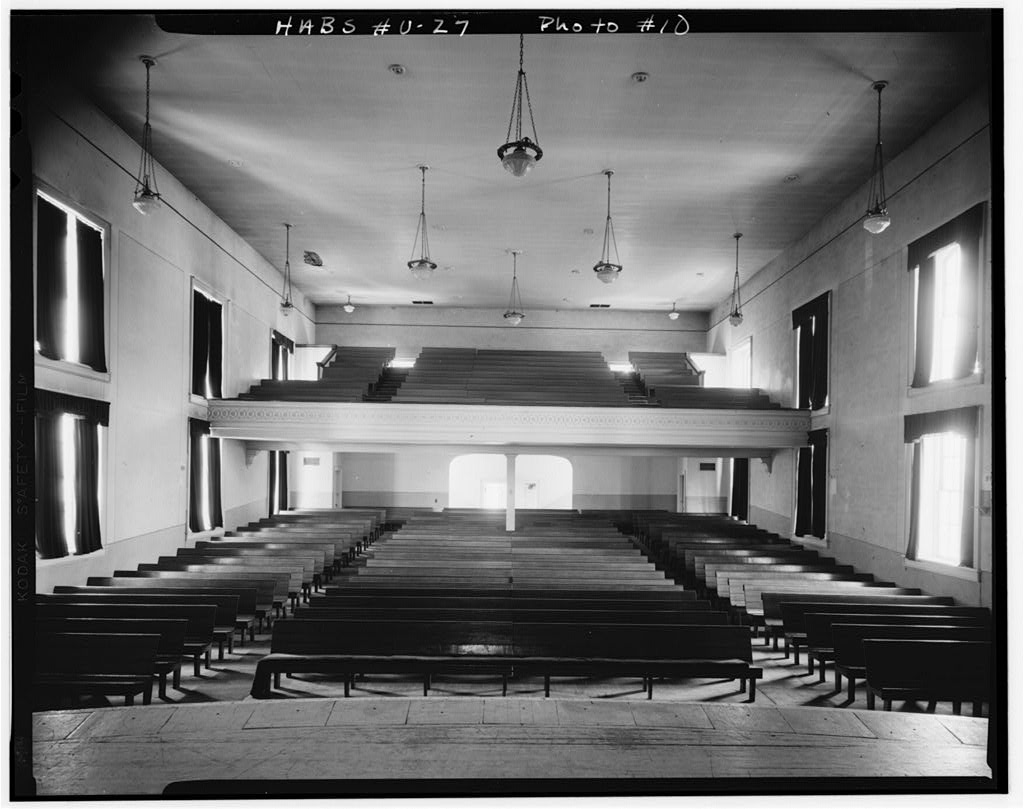
Interior facing east (1967)
