= Logan Tabernacle =

Historic church in Utah, United States

- U.S. National Register of Historic Places
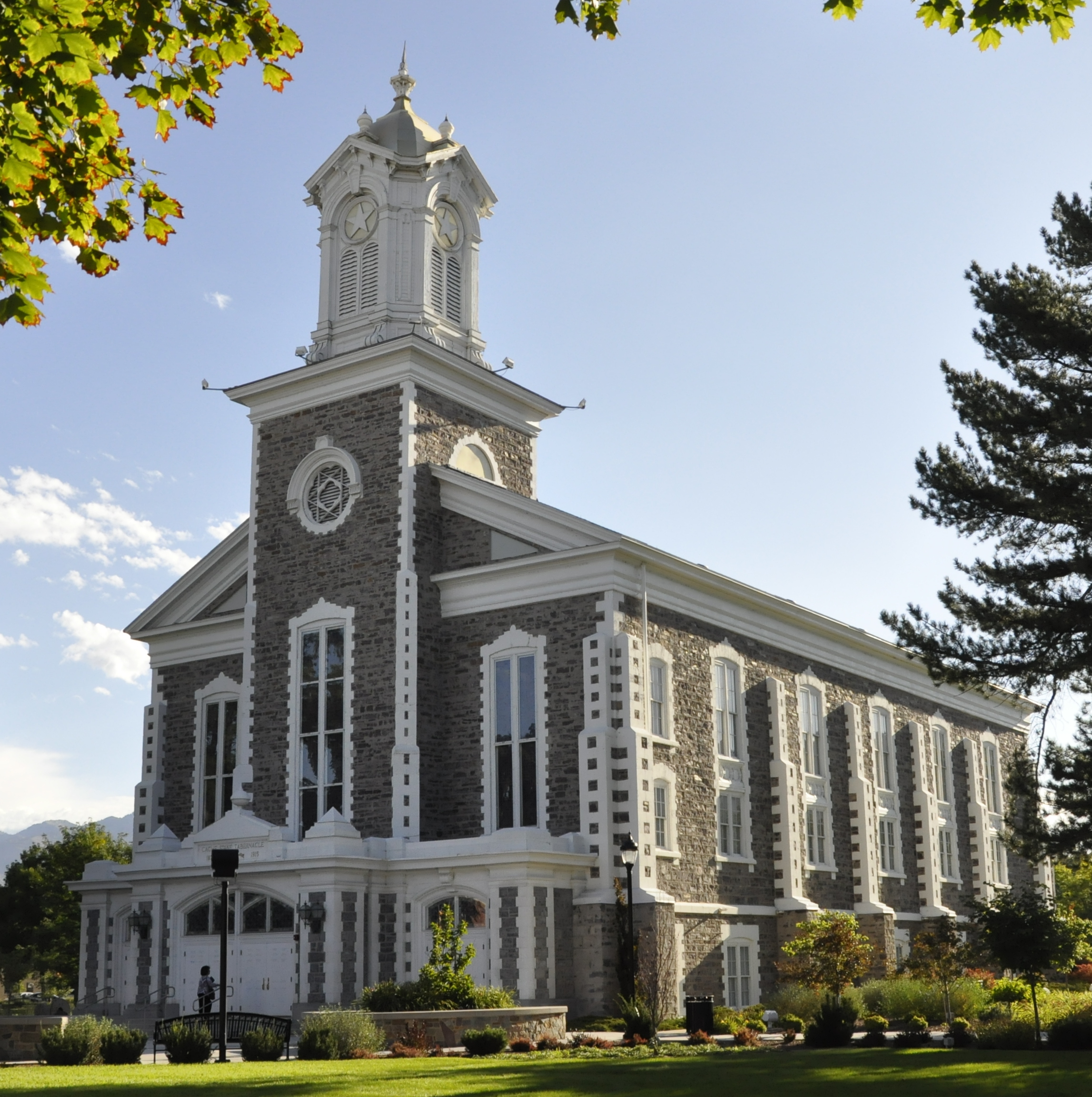
- The Logan Tabernacle in 2014

- Location within Utah Location within the United States
- Location: Bounded by Center, 1st North, Main, and 1st East Sts., Logan, Utah
- Coordinates: 41°43′56″N 111°50′0″W
- Area: 8 acres (3.2 ha)
- Built: 1891
- Architect: Charles Ora Card and Anthon Skanchy
- Architectural style: Combination of Gothic, Greek, Roman, Byzantine and perhaps classical and revival.
- NRHP reference No.: 75001800
- Added to NRHP: November 20, 1975

The Logan Tabernacle is a tabernacle of the Church of Jesus Christ of Latter-day Saints (LDS Church) and is located in Logan, Cache County, Utah. It is used regularly for church meetings, most often semi-annual stake conferences, seminary graduations, musical concerts, and lectures.

== Construction ==
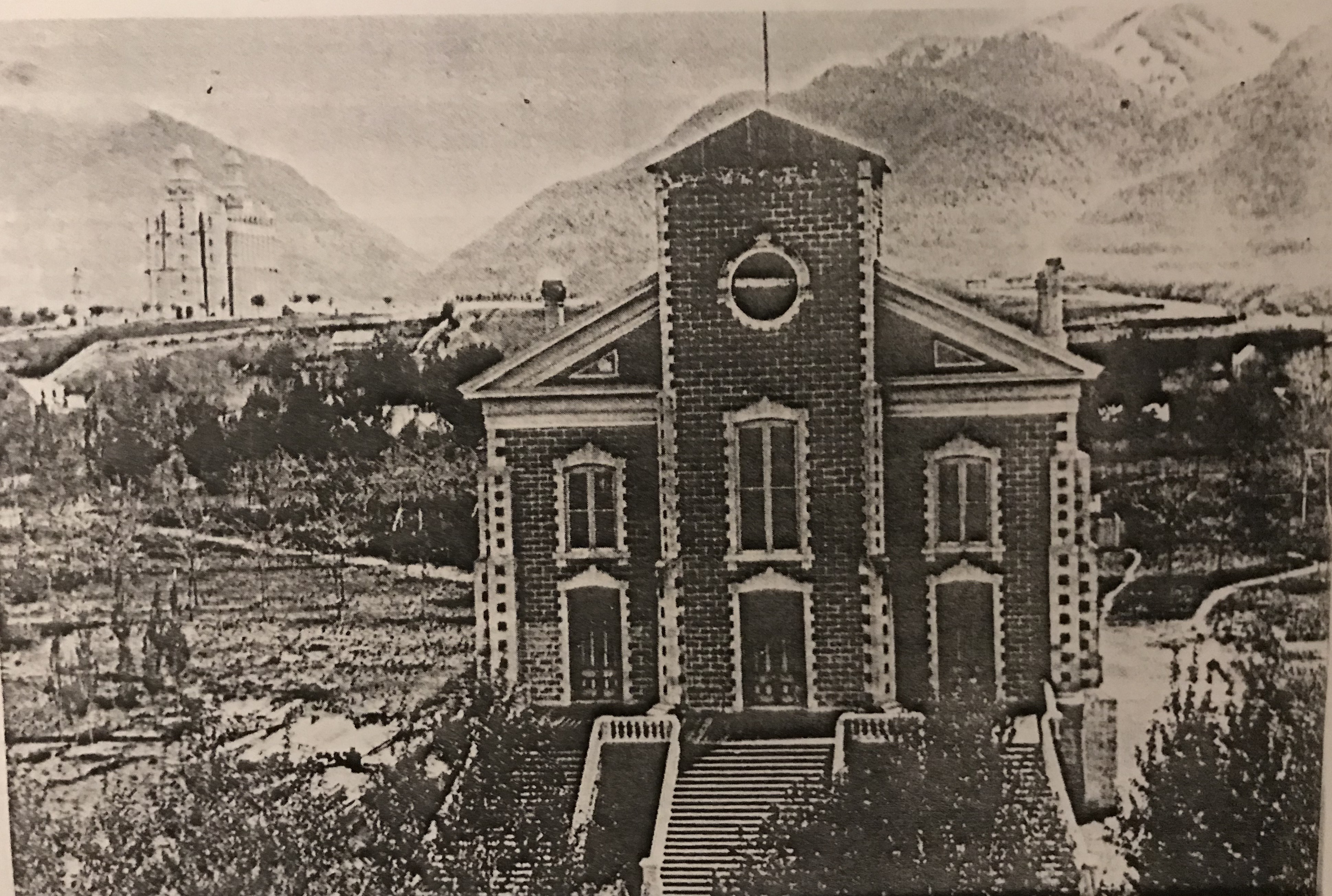
Logan tabernacle in 1881, note absence of tower finial and original exterior staircases leading directly to the main level assembly hall. These were later enclosed in the renovated west entrance.

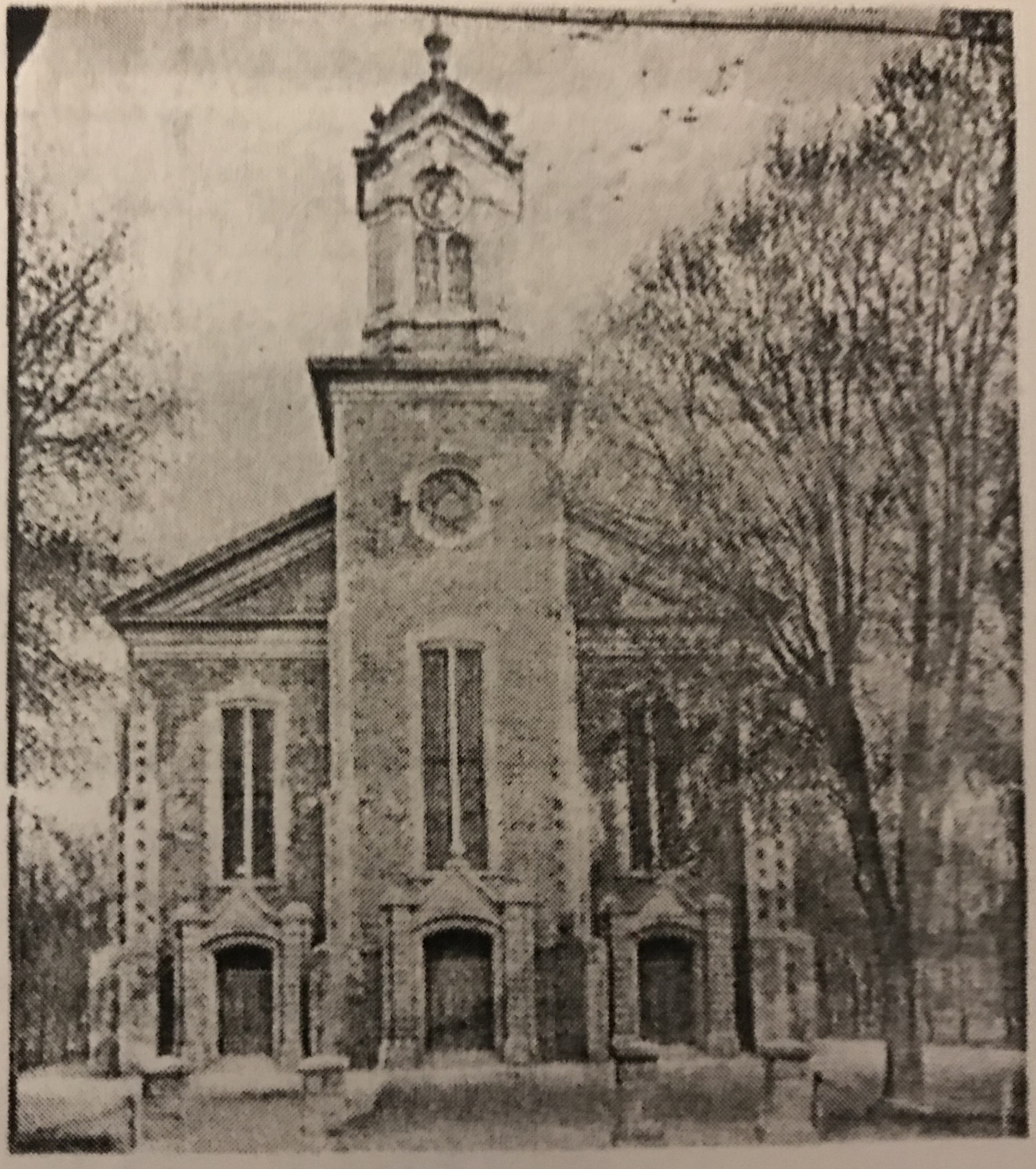
Logan tabernacle west front from Main Street in 1916 with renovated entrance and completed tower.

The foundation of the tabernacle was begun in 1864. The building took twenty-seven years to complete. During that time, work was delayed twice. In 1873, the building work resumed and the size was enlarged from 60'/106' to 65'/130'. The second delay came in 1877 after workers had completed the exterior walls. Workers moved from the tabernacle to finish the nearby Logan Temple. Work soon resumed with the main assembly hall being finished in 1881; the completed building was dedicated in 1891 by LDS Church president Wilford Woodruff.

=== Architecture ===
The building's architectural style is characterized as classically eclectic with elements of Greek, Roman, Gothic and Byzantine styles. The edifice was built entirely from local materials. The exterior walls are of local quartzite quarried in Green Canyon eight miles to the northeast. White limestone was employed for the corners and trimmings and was quarried near Franklin, Idaho some twenty miles to the north.

== Modifications ==
Several major modifications were made not long after the building was completed. Originally, there were three outside stairways leading to the main floor. They were removed and new stairways were rebuilt inside of an entrance enclosure in the late 1880s. The stained glass windows in the west façade were installed sometime before 1910. In the early 1950s the building was heavily renovated with the original pews being replaced and pine floor was covered with asphalt tiles. The interior of the assembly hall was completely redecorated, the walls were painted an unfortunate pale mint green. The original hand-stenciled ceiling painting was covered over with acoustical tile, the organ casework of dark-stained quarter-sawn oak was painted over with "blond" finish and all other furnishings were changed in accordance with the style of the day.

A four-year-long restoration project, completed in 1989 sought to reverse many of these changes and return elements of the original pioneer design to the decor. The interior paint scheme was changed to reflect what was discovered under many layers of paint laid on over the years. The acoustical tile was removed from the ceiling and the simple, elegant stenciling was restored. The original ceiling designs and scroll work were painted on oil cloth and attached directly to the plaster ceiling; the restored painting was directly on the ceiling itself. The pine pillars supporting the balcony in the assembly hall were painted by a Utah artist to resemble marble- a technique known to Utah pioneer artisans at the time the tabernacle was originally constructed and found in other tabernacles at Salt Lake, Box Elder and Paris, Idaho.

In 2019, the church announced the tabernacle would close for seismic upgrades and other renovations in 2021. The following year the tabernacle closed because of the COVID-19 pandemic, allowing the renovation to get started earlier than planned. As part of the renovations, the bell tower and roof were better anchored to the building and a shear wall was added (resulting in the center section of the balcony losing seats); these modifications helped strength the structure against future earthquakes. The historic baptismal font and Family History Center were removed from the basement level and replaced with additional meeting rooms. Various systems were also upgraded, including the HVAC technologies. The newly restored tabernacle was rededicated by Elder Quentin L. Cook on August 25, 2024.

== Pipe organ ==
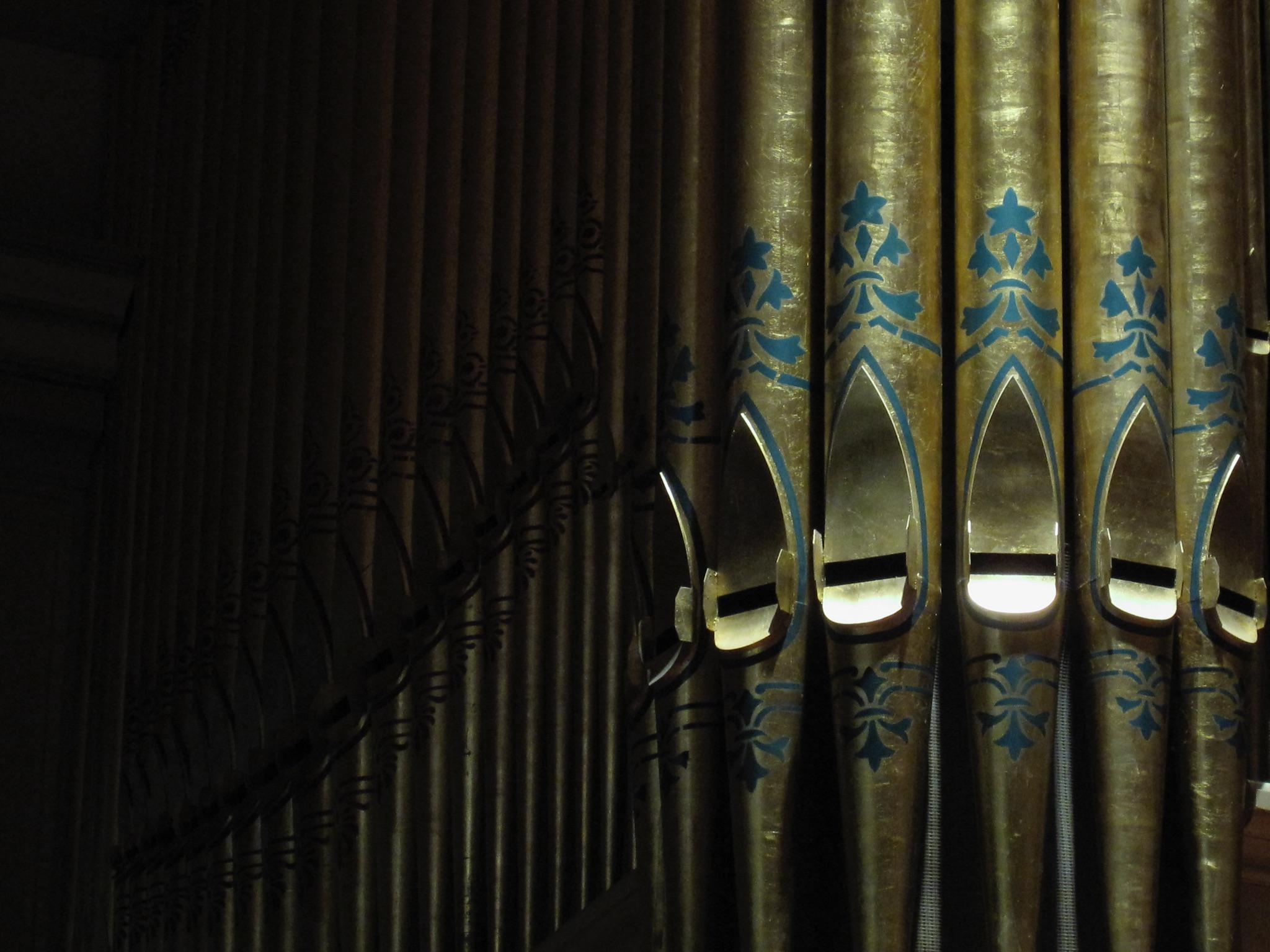
Façade pipes of the Logan Tabernacle Organ.

The Great Organ of the Logan Tabernacle was built by Henry Pilcher's Sons of Louisville, Kentucky. It was shipped to Cache Valley in 1908 and was completed as the firm's Opus 620 and dedicated in a recital given by H.G. Smurthwaite on August 1 of that year. The organ was installed and voiced in the tabernacle by James Day of the Pilcher company and the local newspaper reported that visitors often stopped in to observe the work. The organ's action was originally tubular-pneumatic, a type of pipe organ action that necessitated small lead tubes from each key at the console to the windchests on which stood the pipes.

In 1952-53, the organ was rebuilt by the LDS Church Organ Maintenance Department, under the direction of Wayne Carroll. The key and stop action was electrified and converted to electro-pneumatic action, a new console built by the Reuter organ company was installed and several ranks of original pipework were replaced and/or revoiced. In 1987 and 2009, H. Ronald Poll & Associates of Salt Lake City rebuilt and further modernized the organ. Most recently, the control system was replaced, a new console installed and several digital stops by the Walker Technical Company were added. The instrument currently comprises 45 pipe ranks and some 2,850 individual pipes controlled by a three manual and pedal console. Of the visible 194 gold-leafed façade pipes, 38 speak (i.e. sound) and are located on the southeast side and are stenciled in red. The organ’s smallest pipe is 3/4” long and the largest is almost 16 feet tall. The organ’s wind is generated by a 7 horsepower Spencer blower in the basement.
