= Manti Tabernacle =

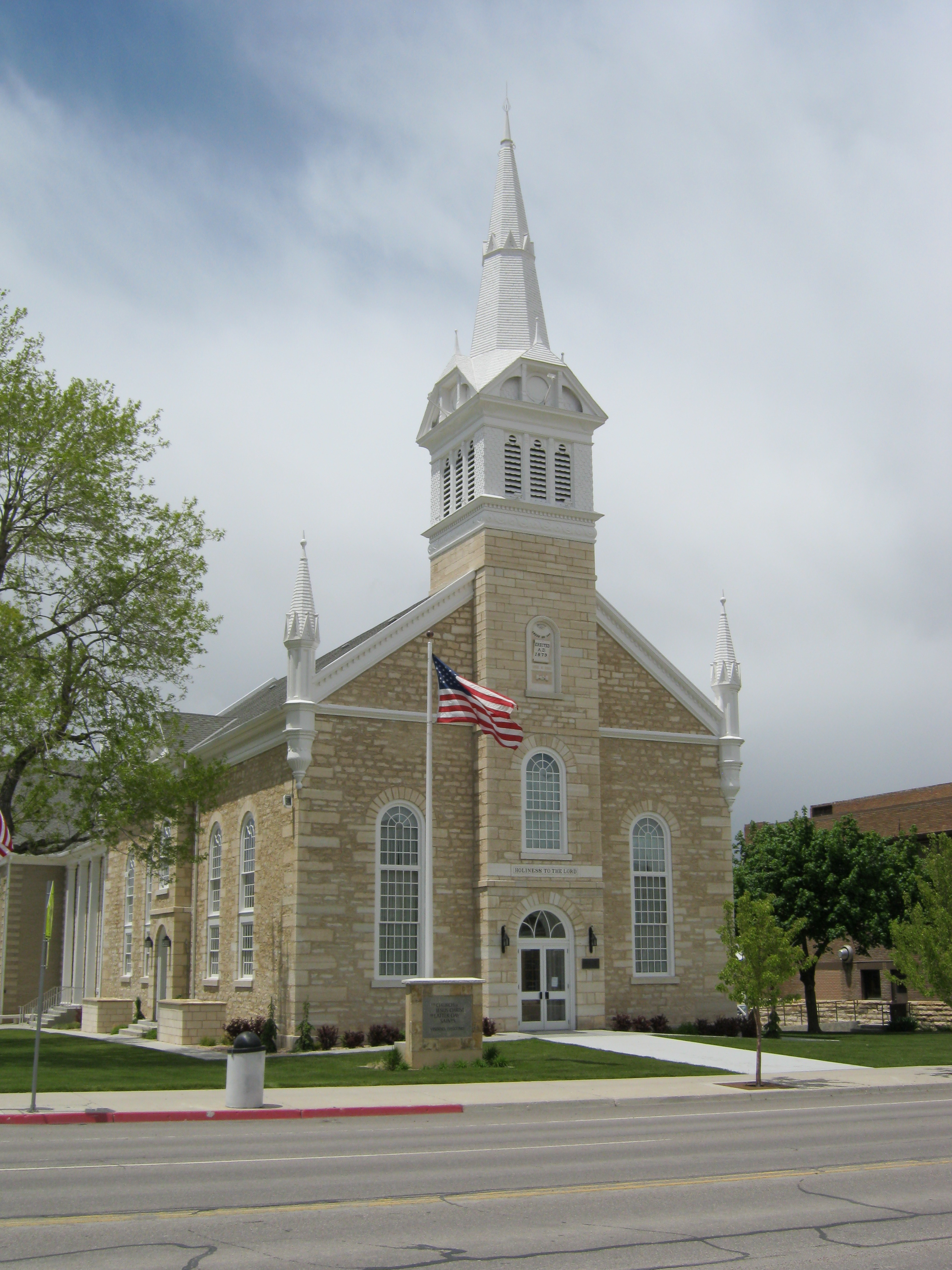
- The tabernacle in 2011
- Interactive map of the Manti Tabernacle area

General information
- Location: 90 South Main Street Manti, Utah
- Coordinates: 39.2643°N 111.6371°W
- Construction started: 1878
- Completed: 1882

The Manti Tabernacle in Manti, Utah is a building built and used by the Church of Jesus Christ of Latter-day Saints. It no longer functions as a tabernacle but as a regular church building, making it one of three 19th-century Latter-day Saint buildings still used for weekly services. The other two are the Pine Valley chapel in Washington County, Utah, and the tabernacle in Bountiful, Utah. It was restored beginning in 2014, the exterior was to look as it did in 1879 and the chapel as it appeared after the 1921 remodel. The mural that hangs in the chapel is the same as that appearing in the Provo Utah Temple.
