= Logan High School (Utah) =

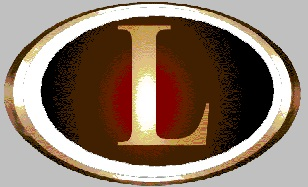
- Home of the Grizzlies

Location
- 162 W. 100 S. Logan, Utah, U.S. 41.729°N 111.84°W

Information
- Type: Public
- Motto: A Clear Mind, a Strong Arm, and a Brave Heart
- Established: 1917, 109 years ago
- School district: Logan City S.D.
- Principal: James Mather
- Staff: 63.98 (FTE)
- Grades: 9–12
- Enrollment: 1,491 (2023–2024)
- Student to teacher ratio: 23.30
- Colors: Crimson & gold
- Athletics: Football, baseball, basketball, tennis, softball, wrestling, volleyball, lacrosse, golf, cross country, track and field, swimming, soccer
- Athletics conference: UHSAA Class 4A Region XI
- Mascot: Grizzly
- Newspaper: The Grizzly
- Yearbook: Amphion
- Elevation: 4,510 ft (1,370 m) AMSL
- Website: loganhigh.org

Logan High School is a four-year public high school in the western United States, located in Logan, Utah. Established 109 years ago in 1917 as part of the Logan City School District, its campus is in the southwest part of the city. Logan High is currently in the Utah High School Activities Association (UHSAA) Class 4A Region XI and its mascot is a grizzly.

== History ==
The city school board voted to establish a high school in 1917, having previously only offered an education through the 8th grade. High school was previously conducted at Brigham Young College in Logan. A building to house the new high school was completed in 1919, on the corner of Church and Federal Avenues in Logan. The first senior class graduated in 1921. In 1926, the school relocated to the campus of recently closed Brigham Young College, on 200 S between 100 and 300 W.

A magnitude 5.7 earthquake on August 30, 1962 caused significant damage to the old college buildings. In 1968, a new athletic field complex was completed, and named after the late Glen "Zeus" Worthington, the school's athletic director (1938–1967) and USU and state of Utah Athletic Hall of Fame inductee. A physical education complex was added in 1978.

In 1984, the school expanded to include a freshman class. With the increasing number of students, the Woodruff Elementary school was closed and converted to the English department and writing lab; a new Woodruff was constructed at 650 S 1000 W. The old boys' gym was demolished in the summer of 1999, and a new gymnasium, lobby, and storage area was built in its place, opening during the 2000–2001 school year.

During the 2003–2004 school year, several athletic fields were renovated or built, including a new turf football field, softball diamond, and sand volleyball courts. These were followed by a new baseball diamond, constructed during the 2006–2007 school year. In 2007, a large addition was built for the school, which included a media center, larger cafeteria, and new classrooms, as well as remodeling along the south and west sides of the building.

In 2015, the athletics facilities, including the baseball and softball diamonds, football field, and basketball arena underwent renovation under new athletic director Mike Hansen. Work began on a complete remodel of the entire high school in 2015, and was completed in 2018.

== Art programs ==
Location in Utah

The school offers several co-curricular activities in the arts, including orchestra, band, and choir programs, as well as visual arts, ceramics, and photography programs. LHS offers a drama program and theater arts classes along with an extracurricular drama club. The school puts on a musical (with pit orchestra) and a play each year, as well as a Concerto Night in which audition–selected students perform an instrumental concerto with the full Philharmonic Orchestra.

=== Orchestra ===
The LHS Orchestra program consists of three string orchestras with a total of about 150 students. The orchestras are divided by grade level; the Concert Orchestra is made up of freshmen, the Sinfonia Orchestra consists of sophomores, and the Philharmonic Orchestra consists of juniors and seniors. Logan High orchestras regularly qualify for state-level competition.

=== Band ===
LHS has two bands, the lower or symphonic band and the upper or wind band, as well as two extracurricular jazz bands. Unlike the orchestra, the bands are not split up by grade but by skill. The Wind Band and Jazz Band go on national trips every other year, visiting cities such as Boston, Chicago, New York, San Diego, and Washington, D.C. They also regularly participate in state and regional festivals and competitions.

== Extra-curricular activities ==
Logan High School offers over 25 student clubs and 17 varsity athletic teams. Notable student organizations include the debate team, which won the Utah class 3A state title during the 2007–2008 school year and took second in the 2009–2010 4A State Tournament; the football team, which won state titles in 1978, 1988, 1989, 2000, 2005, 2007, 2011, and 2015; the swimming team, which claimed the state title in 2001, 2002, 2004 and 2005, 2006, 2009; the boys' tennis team, which won state in 2009; the lacrosse team, which claimed state titles in 2006 and 2015; and the ice hockey team, which won the state championship in 2009.

Logan High's suicide checkers team won the state championship in 2009. Logan High School also has a competitive math league, which took first in the state math contest in 2011. Logan also regularly competes in Academic Olympiad at Utah State University.

=== Student Body Officers ===
Any student that is a current sophomore or junior with a 3.0 GPA and no failing grades is eligible to run for a Student Body Office. The offices that can be held are President (Seniors Only), Executive Vice-President (Seniors Only), Historian (Seniors Only), Academics VP (Juniors and Seniors), Activities and Clubs VP (Juniors and Seniors), Athletics VP (Juniors and Seniors), Publicity VP (Juniors and Seniors), Service VP (Juniors and Seniors), and the Student Outreach VP (Juniors and Seniors). Student Body Officer elections are held in March. The newly-elected officers will then spend the remainder of the year planning for Beach Week, which is the second to last week of the school year.

== Football ==
=== State championships ===
The Logan High football team reached the state championships in the following years: 1978, 1988, 1989, 2000, 2005, 2007, 2011, and 2015.

==== Coaching ====
Mike Favero took over the head coaching position at Logan High in 1999. He has successfully led the program to be competitive in the state. Favero has received numerous honors and awards, including Western United States NFHS Coach of the Year (2008), UHSAA Coach of the Year (2008), four-time UFCA Coach of the Year (2000, 2005, 2007, 2011), USA Football Champions Award (2007), as well as serving as the 2007 NFL Youth Football State of Utah delegate.

=== Notable player achievements ===
- Merlin Olsen: former NFL Hall of Famer, Los Angeles Rams
- Chris Cooley: former NFL Pro Bowl tight end, Washington Redskins, Parade All-American
- Phil Olsen: former NFL Player, Los Angeles Rams
- Hal Garner: former NFL linebacker, Buffalo Bills
- Willie Beecher: former NFL kicker, Miami Dolphins
- Riley Nelson: Utah Gatorade Player of the Year, Parade All-American
- DJ Nelson: Max Preps 2nd Team All-American
- 30 collegiate football players
- 43 1st team all-state players
- Brandon Stephens: PrepStar All-American, Bluechip All-American, Superprep All-American, ESPN TOP 100 List, USA Today Top 100, Utah Football Foundation Hall of Fame
- Rod Tueller: former head coach of the Utah State Aggies men's basketball team; served as head coach at LHS prior to taking over at USU

==== Mike Favero era ====
- 5 State Championships (2000, 2005, 2007, 2011, 2015)
- 2 Top 100 national rankings 2005 #72 and 2011 #92
- 6 State Championship game appearances (2000, 2003, 2005, 2007, 2011, 2015)
- 8 Region Championships (2000, 2001, 2005, 2007, 2010, 2011, 2013, 2015)

== Notable alumni ==
- May Swenson, poet and playwright
- Chris Cooley, football
- Pepa (Sandra Denton), hip–hop artist, rapper and actress
- Luke Falk, football
- Hal Garner, football
- Lars Peter Hansen, economics
- Merlin Olsen, NFL player, actor
- Phil Olsen, football
- Kip Thorne, physicist
