= Millville, Utah =

City in Utah, United States

- City
- Location in Cache County and the state of Utah
- Coordinates: 41°41′07″N 111°49′16″W
- Country: United States
- State: Utah
- County: Cache
- Established: 1860
- Founder: George White Pitkin
- Named for: A sawmill

Area
  - Total: 2.51 sq mi (6.49 km^{2})
  - Land: 2.51 sq mi (6.49 km^{2})
  - Water: 0 sq mi (0.00 km^{2})
- Elevation: 4,643 ft (1,415 m)

Population (2020)
  - Total: 2,326
  - Estimate (2022): 2,300
  - Density: 886.7/sq mi (342.37/km^{2})
- Time zone: UTC-7 (Mountain (MST))
  - Summer (DST): UTC-6 (MDT)
- ZIP code: 84326
- Area code: 435
- FIPS code: 49-50370
- GNIS feature ID: 2411112
- Website: millvilleut.gov

Millville is a city in Cache County, Utah, United States. The population was 2,222 at the 2020 census, with an estimated population of 2,300 in 2022. It is included in the Logan, Utah-Idaho Metropolitan Statistical Area.

== Geography ==
Millville is located on the southeast side of Cache Valley in northern Utah and is bordered by Providence to the north, Logan to the northwest, and Nibley to the southwest. According to the United States Census Bureau, Millville has a total area of 2.1 square miles (5.5 km^{2}), all land.

=== Climate ===
The climate in this area has mild differences between highs and lows, and there is adequate rainfall year-round. According to the Köppen Climate Classification system, Millville has a marine west coast climate, abbreviated "CFB" on climate maps.

== History ==
George White Pitkin built the first log home in Millville, before the settlement was organized or named. He and his sons, Ammon Paul Pitkin and George Orrin Pitkin, built the home in 1859. The family moved into it in late spring 1860. The present location of the home is 136 W. 100 South, in Millville. It became the Pitkin homestead. Church and school were held there. As George White Pitkin was an educated man, he taught until a "proper" church and school were built. Later, the Pitkin family built a two-story rock home with walls 2 feet (0.61 m) thick. George died at the age of 72 on November 26, 1873, and is buried in the Millville cemetery.

== Demographics ==
=== 2020 census ===
As of the 2020 census, Millville had a population of 2,326, with 628 households and 553 families residing in the city; the median age was 30.4 years, 36.4% of residents were under the age of 18, and 10.5% were 65 years of age or older. For every 100 females there were 105.8 males, and for every 100 females age 18 and over there were 103.7 males age 18 and over.

91.4% of residents lived in urban areas, while 8.6% lived in rural areas.

There were 628 households in Millville, of which 53.0% had children under the age of 18 living in them. Of all households, 79.8% were married-couple households, 7.6% were households with a male householder and no spouse or partner present, and 10.5% were households with a female householder and no spouse or partner present. About 9.2% of all households were made up of individuals and 4.5% had someone living alone who was 65 years of age or older.

There were 650 housing units, of which 3.4% were vacant. The homeowner vacancy rate was 1.0% and the rental vacancy rate was 0.0%.

Racial composition as of the 2020 census
Race	Number	Percent
White	2,140	92.0%
Black or African American	0	0.0%
American Indian and Alaska Native	8	0.3%
Asian	17	0.7%
Native Hawaiian and Other Pacific Islander	3	0.1%
Some other race	80	3.4%
Two or more races	78	3.4%
Hispanic or Latino (of any race)	134	5.8%

=== 2000 census ===
At the 2000 census, there were 1,507 people, 395 households and 361 families residing in the city. The population density was 642.3 inhabitants per square mile (248.0/km^{2}). There were 405 housing units at an average density of 172.6 per square mile (66.6/km^{2}). The racial makeup of the city was 96.75% White, 0.40% Native American, 0.33% Asian, 1.59% from other races, and 0.93% from two or more races. Hispanic or Latino of any race were 2.12% of the population.

Historical population
Census	Pop.	Note	%±
1870	402		—
1880	539		34.1%
1890	679		26.0%
1900	509		−25.0%
1910	625		22.8%
1920	409		−34.6%
1930	403		−1.5%
1940	439		8.9%
1950	401		−8.7%
1960	364		−9.2%
1970	441		21.2%
1980	848		92.3%
1990	1,202		41.7%
2000	1,507		25.4%
2010	1,829		21.4%
2020	2,326		27.2%
2022 (est.)	2,300		−1.1%
U.S. Decennial Census

There were 395 households, of which 59.5% had children under the age of 18 living with them, 83.5% were married couples living together, 6.3% had a female householder with no husband present, and 8.4% were non-families. 7.6% of all households were made up of individuals, and 2.8% had someone living alone who was 65 years of age or older. The average household size was 3.82 and the average family size was 4.02.

39.2% of the population were under the age of 18, 12.8% from 18 to 24, 25.3% from 25 to 44, 18.2% from 45 to 64, and 4.6% who were 65 years of age or older. The median age was 23 years. For every 100 females, there were 102.3 males. For every 100 females age 18 and over, there were 103.3 males.

The median household income was $51,513 and the median family income was $52,813. Males had a median income of $32,969 and females $22,500. The per capita income was $13,977. About 2.7% of families and 3.1% of the population were below the poverty line, including 2.2% of those under age 18 and 6.8% of those age 65 or over.

== Notable people ==
- Craig Jessop, director of the Mormon Tabernacle Choir
- Joseph Smith Jessop, polygamist patriarch
