= Smithfield, Utah =

City in Utah, United States

- City
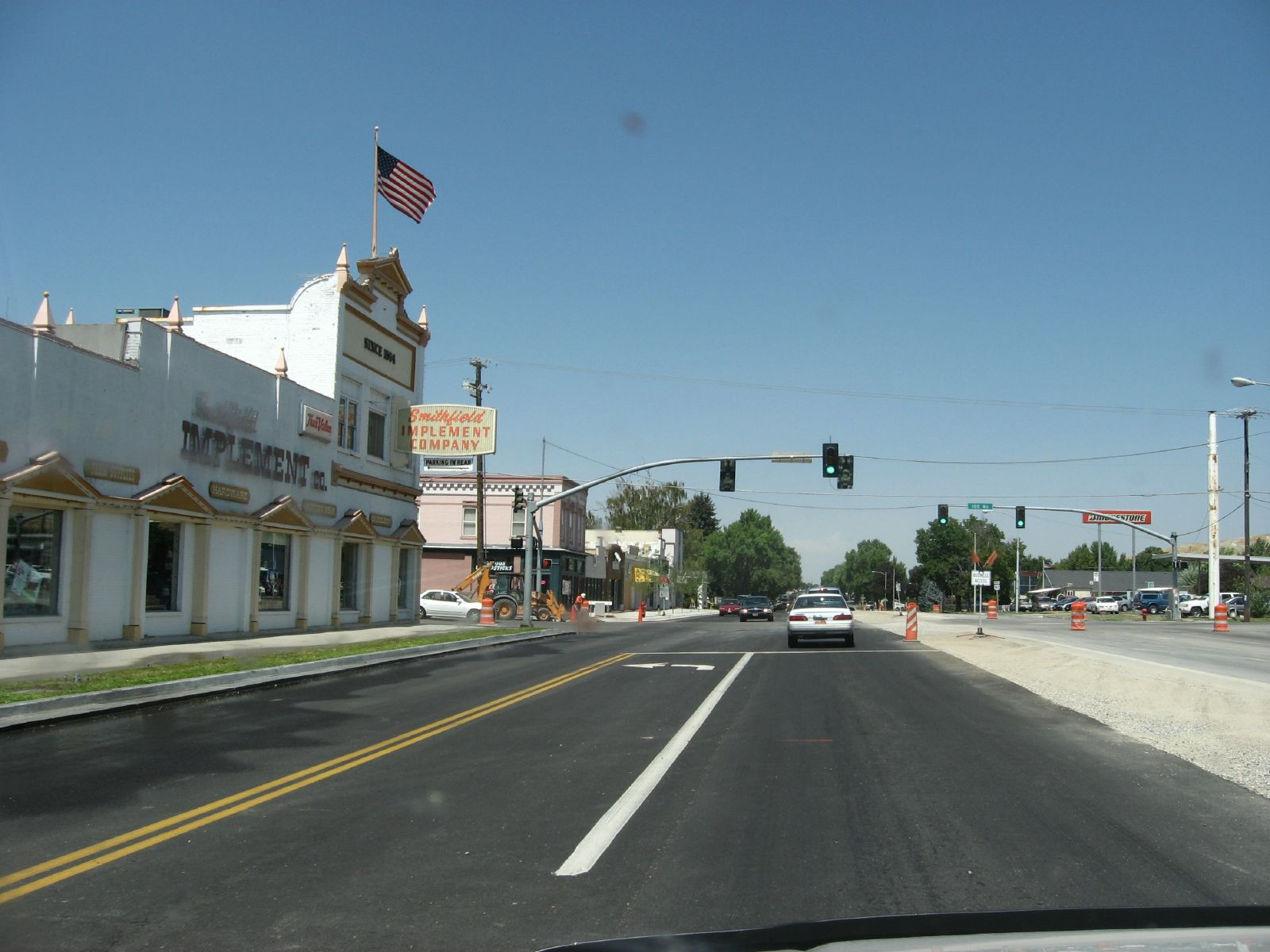
- Nickname: Smithy
- Motto: "Utah's Health City"
- Location in Cache County and the state of Utah
- Coordinates: 41°50′06″N 111°49′38″W
- Country: United States
- State: Utah
- County: Cache
- Settled: 1859
- Named for: John Glover Smith

Government
  - Type: Mayor/Council

Area
  - Total: 5.35 sq mi (13.9 km^{2})
  - Land: 5.35 sq mi (13.9 km^{2})
  - Water: 0.00 sq mi (0 km^{2})
- Elevation: 4,636 ft (1,413 m)

Population (2020)
  - Total: 13,571
  - Density: 2,246.82/sq mi (867.50/km^{2})
- Time zone: UTC-7 (Mountain (MST))
  - Summer (DST): UTC-6 (MDT)
- ZIP code: 84335
- Area code: 435
- FIPS code: 49-69640
- GNIS feature ID: 2411911
- Website: smithfieldutah.gov

Smithfield is a city in Cache County, Utah, United States. The population was 13,571 at the 2020 United States census, It is included in the Logan, Utah–Idaho Metropolitan Statistical Area, and is the second largest city in the area after Logan, the county seat. Smithfield is home to Sky View High School and three public elementary schools.

== History ==
Originally known as "Summit Creek" (due to its location on that creek), Smithfield was founded in 1857 by brothers Robert and John Thornley and their cousin Seth Langton, who were sent north from Salt Lake City by LDS Church President Brigham Young to found a settlement on Summit Creek. After a preliminary scouting, Robert returned with his new wife Annie Brighton. The first winter was spent in a wagon box. By the next summer, with more settlers arriving, a small fort was built on the edge of the creek, one cabin of which remains. As the settlement grew, John Glover Smith was named as bishop to lead the church congregation, and the town took his name. In December 1902, the sizable Smithfield Tabernacle was completed. By 1917 the town had planted trees on both sides of its Main Street and had acquired a Carnegie library and a Rotary club. Dependent for many years on dairying, a Del Monte canning factory, and the sugar beet industry, the town is now essentially a bedroom community for Logan and its Utah State University.

== Geography ==
According to the United States Census Bureau, the city has a total area of 5.0 square miles (12.9 km^{2}), all land.

== Demographics ==
Historical population
| Census | Pop. | Note | %± |
|---|---|---|---|
| 1870 | 744 | | — |
| 1880 | 1,177 | | 58.2% |
| 1890 | 1,080 | | −8.2% |
| 1900 | 1,494 | | 38.3% |
| 1910 | 1,865 | | 24.8% |
| 1920 | 2,421 | | 29.8% |
| 1930 | 2,353 | | −2.8% |
| 1940 | 2,461 | | 4.6% |
| 1950 | 2,383 | | −3.2% |
| 1960 | 2,512 | | 5.4% |
| 1970 | 3,342 | | 33.0% |
| 1980 | 4,993 | | 49.4% |
| 1990 | 5,566 | | 11.5% |
| 2000 | 7,261 | | 30.5% |
| 2010 | 9,495 | | 30.8% |
| 2020 | 13,571 | | 42.9% |
US Decennial Census

=== 2020 census ===
As of the 2020 census, Smithfield had a population of 13,571. The median age was 29.1 years. 35.9% of residents were under the age of 18 and 10.1% of residents were 65 years of age or older. For every 100 females there were 97.9 males, and for every 100 females age 18 and over there were 97.6 males age 18 and over.

98.0% of residents lived in urban areas, while 2.0% lived in rural areas.

There were 4,009 households in Smithfield, of which 50.4% had children under the age of 18 living in them. Of all households, 72.7% were married-couple households, 9.3% were households with a male householder and no spouse or partner present, and 14.9% were households with a female householder and no spouse or partner present. About 13.0% of all households were made up of individuals and 6.3% had someone living alone who was 65 years of age or older.

There were 4,112 housing units, of which 2.5% were vacant. The homeowner vacancy rate was 0.5% and the rental vacancy rate was 1.6%.

Racial composition as of the 2020 census
| Race | Number | Percent |
|---|---|---|
| White | 11,958 | 88.1% |
| Black or African American | 58 | 0.4% |
| American Indian and Alaska Native | 70 | 0.5% |
| Asian | 120 | 0.9% |
| Native Hawaiian and Other Pacific Islander | 25 | 0.2% |
| Other | 642 | 4.7% |
| Two or more races | 698 | 5.1% |
| Hispanic or Latino (of any race) | 1,268 | 9.3% |

=== 2000 census ===
At the 2000 United States census there were 7,261 people in 2,066 households, including 1,782 families, in the city. The population density was 1,686.6 inhabitants per square mile (651.2/km^{2}). There were 2,159 housing units at an average density of 501.5 per square mile (193.6/km^{2}). The racial makeup of the city was 95.23% White, 0.12% African American, 0.23% Native American, 0.48% Asian, 0.04% Pacific Islander, 2.82% from other races, and 1.06% from two or more races. Hispanic or Latino of any race were 5.04%.

Of the 2,066 households 53.2% had children under the age of 18 living with them, 78.5% were married couples living together, 6.1% had a female householder with no husband present, and 13.7% were non-families. 12.2% of households were one person and 6.8% were one person aged 65 or older. The average household size was 3.51 and the average family size was 3.85.

The age distribution was 37.8% under the age of 18, 12.1% from 18 to 24, 25.8% from 25 to 44, 16.2% from 45 to 64, and 8.0% 65 or older. The median age was 25 years. For every 100 females, there were 99.5 males. For every 100 females age 18 and over, there were 96.6 males.

The median household income was $47,745 and the median family income was $49,828. Males had a median income of $35,708 versus $21,076 for females. The per capita income for the city was $14,933. About 4.5% of families and 6.2% of the population were below the poverty line, including 6.6% of those under age 18 and 8.0% of those age 65 or over.

== Education ==
=== Elementary schools ===
- Birch Creek Elementary
- Summit Elementary
- Sunrise Elementary

=== High school ===
- Sky View High School

== Community facilities ==
- Birch Creek Golf Course (owned by Smithfield City)
- Smithfield Cemetery (owned by Smithfield City)
- Smithfield Public Library (owned by Smithfield City)
- Smithfield Tabernacle | Youth Center

== See also ==
- Schreiber Foods (cheese factory in town owned by this company)
