= Stake (Latter Day Saints) =

Latter Day Saint church administrative unit

A stake is an administrative unit composed of multiple congregations in certain denominations of the Latter Day Saint movement. The name "stake" derives from the Book of Isaiah: "enlarge the place of thy tent; stretch forth the curtains of thine habitation; spare not, lengthen thy cords, and strengthen thy stakes" (Isaiah 54:2). A stake is sometimes referred to as a stake of Zion.

== History ==
The first Latter Day Saint stake was organized at church headquarters in Kirtland, Ohio, on February 17, 1834, with the movement's founder, Joseph Smith, as its president. The second stake was organized further west in Clay County, Missouri, later that year on July 3, 1834, with David Whitmer as president. The Missouri stake was then relocated in 1836 to Far West, Missouri, and the Kirtland Stake in northern Ohio was dissolved in 1838. Another stake was subsequently organized at Adam-ondi-Ahman in 1838 and abandoned later that year due to the events of the Mormon War of 1838 in Missouri. In 1839, the church's central stake was re-established further west at Nauvoo, Illinois, near the east bank of the Mississippi River, with William Marks, as president.

Additional stakes were established in the area around Nauvoo in 1840. Immediately after the death of Joseph Smith in Carthage, Illinois in June 1844, there was a succession crisis. In 1846, all of the existing stakes, including the Nauvoo Stake, were discontinued as a result of the exodus of the majority of the Latter Day Saints to the Salt Lake Valley.

== The Church of Jesus Christ of Latter-day Saints ==
The Church of Jesus Christ of Latter-day Saints (LDS Church) is the largest denomination in the Latter Day Saint movement. After the death of Joseph Smith, Brigham Young assumed the leadership of the church and led its members westward in wagon and handcart trains across the Mississippi River, the Great Plains, and through the Rocky Mountains to the Salt Lake Valley. The first stake there was the Salt Lake Stake, established October 3, 1847, in the future site of Salt Lake City, with Joseph Smith's nephew, John Smith, as president. At the time of church president Young's death in 1877, there were 20 LDS Church stakes in operation with approximately 250 wards.

New stakes are created when the congregations in existing stakes or districts have grown sufficiently to support one. When districts become stakes, they are no longer presided over by a mission president. New stakes are frequently formed by dividing an existing stake (or by creating three stakes from two existing stakes, etc.). In addition to the size and number of local congregations, the creation of a new stake also requires sufficient Melchizedek priesthood holders to fill required leadership positions. At times the absence of available leadership constrains the creation of new stakes and the number of congregations within a stake can be much larger than normal. The geographical area encompassed by a stake varies between countries and regions based on membership density. In Utah, a stake might encompass a few square miles in area. In contrast, a stake in another part of the world might require thousands of square miles to comprise a sufficient number of members.

In December 2012, Jeffrey R. Holland organized the church's 3,000th stake in Freetown, Sierra Leone in West Africa. At the end of 2015, there were 3,174 stakes in the LDS Church. As of December 31, 2019, the LDS Church reported 3,437 stakes.

=== Stake organization ===
The stake is an intermediate level in the organizational hierarchy of the LDS Church. The lowest level, consisting of a single congregation, is known as a ward or branch. Stakes are organized from a group of contiguous wards or branches. To be created, a stake must be composed of at least five wards. A stake may have up to a total of 16 congregations. Most stakes are composed of five to ten wards. In the United States and Canada, a minimum of 3,000 members is required to create a stake; elsewhere, a minimum of 1,900 members is required. For a stake to be created, there must be at least 99 active, full-tithe-paying Melchizedek priesthood holders living in the stake boundaries. In late 2023, the First Presidency announced standardized requirements for becoming a ward which took effect in 2024.

Minimum requirements to become a stake	2024 Standardization	Prior to 2024	
Minimum requirements to become a stake	Worldwide	US & Canada	Rest of world
Total Members (Note: includes both attending and not attending)	2,000	3,000	1,900
AFTMPH (Note: AFTMPH: Active, Full-Tithe-Paying Melchizedek Priesthood Holders)	150	180	120
Participating Adults (Note: Participating adults are individuals who pay full or partial tithes, hold a current temple recommend, have a calling in the Church, or are new members who are attending sacrament meeting during their first year of membership.)	500	none specified	
Participating Youth (Note: Participating youth are youth enrolled in seminary.)	100 (Note: recommended but not required)	none specified	
Number of Wards	5	5	5
Minimum requirements to become a ward

Stakes may be compared to dioceses in other episcopal Christian denominations.

==== Stake officers ====
The presiding officer in a stake is known as the stake president. The president is assisted by two counselors and the three together form a stake presidency. The stake presidency is assisted in turn by a twelve-member body, called the stake high council. The members of the stake presidency and stake high council hold the priesthood office of high priest. The stake presidency and the high council handle the administrative and judicial business of the stake. The three members of the stake presidency are given the honorific title "president".

In an area where there are insufficient congregations to form a stake, a district is formed to oversee the congregations. The presiding officer in a district is called the district president. The district president may or may not have counselors, depending on the number of members in the district. A district council of up to twelve individuals may also be formed. Duties which would be carried out by a stake presidency within a stake are shared between the district presidency and the mission presidency in a district.

In addition to the presidency and high council, stake organization leaders are called to oversee the operation of the stake's various organizations. These correspond to those at the ward level, and include the Relief Society, Primary, Young Men, Young Women, and Sunday School organizations. Typically, the stake-level auxiliary leadership consists of a presidency (made up of a president and two counselors), a secretary, and perhaps additional assistants or board members with specific responsibilities within the organization. The stake organization leaders provide oversight, advice, and counsel for the ward-level leaders and organize stake-wide activities. Other stake specialists may be called to organize activities—typically sports or drama programs—which are more suitable for the larger numbers of people available to a stake and might be difficult for a ward to carry out on its own. Stake organization leaders, especially in the Young Men and Young Women organizations, may also coordinate activities with other stakes in the general area. This is especially common of youth dances, and occasionally of youth conferences.

All stake leaders are lay members who serve without remuneration. Today, stake presidents generally serve for seven to eleven years. In the past, lengths of tenure have varied, with some stake presidents serving for many decades.

==== Stake conference ====
Each stake will hold a stake conference twice a year under the direction of the President of the Quorum of the Twelve Apostles. The stake president presides at these conferences, unless a general authority or area seventy is assigned to the conference. The stake president is responsible for organizing the conferences or assist in doing so under the direction of the general authority or area seventy as directed. The conferences are used to conduct stake business (primarily the appointment and sustaining of stake officers) and to disseminate counsel and guidance from the stake presidency. Speakers at stake conferences generally include the three members of the stake presidency and other stake members, invited by the stake presidency to speak on assigned topics. When a general authority or area seventy presides, he is the featured speaker.

The general session (for all stake members) is usually held on Sunday. This may be held in a local tabernacle if available. If held in the stake center, the general session may be divided into multiple sessions, so that all stake members may be accommodated in the building. A session for all adult members is generally held on the preceding Saturday evening. A priesthood leadership session is also held in conjunction with a stake conference. Some stakes are geographically large enough that multiple sessions of stake conference may held at different locations to accommodate those who live in distant areas.

A multi-site stake conference has become more common in the current structure. As the number of stakes continued to grow, it became more difficult for general authorities to visit stake conferences, even on a semi-regular basis. Area and regional conferences had been organized attempts to counteract this situation. A format has developed in the church such that groups of stakes are designated to receive a satellite broadcast from Salt Lake City. Using the recording studio at the Conference Center, general authorities deliver sermons that are broadcast to each designated stake. Each stake conducts its own opening hymns and prayers and conducts its own business before the broadcast begins. Another advantage of this format is that in stakes that are geographically large it is easier to hold stake conference in more than one location.

=== Stake center ===
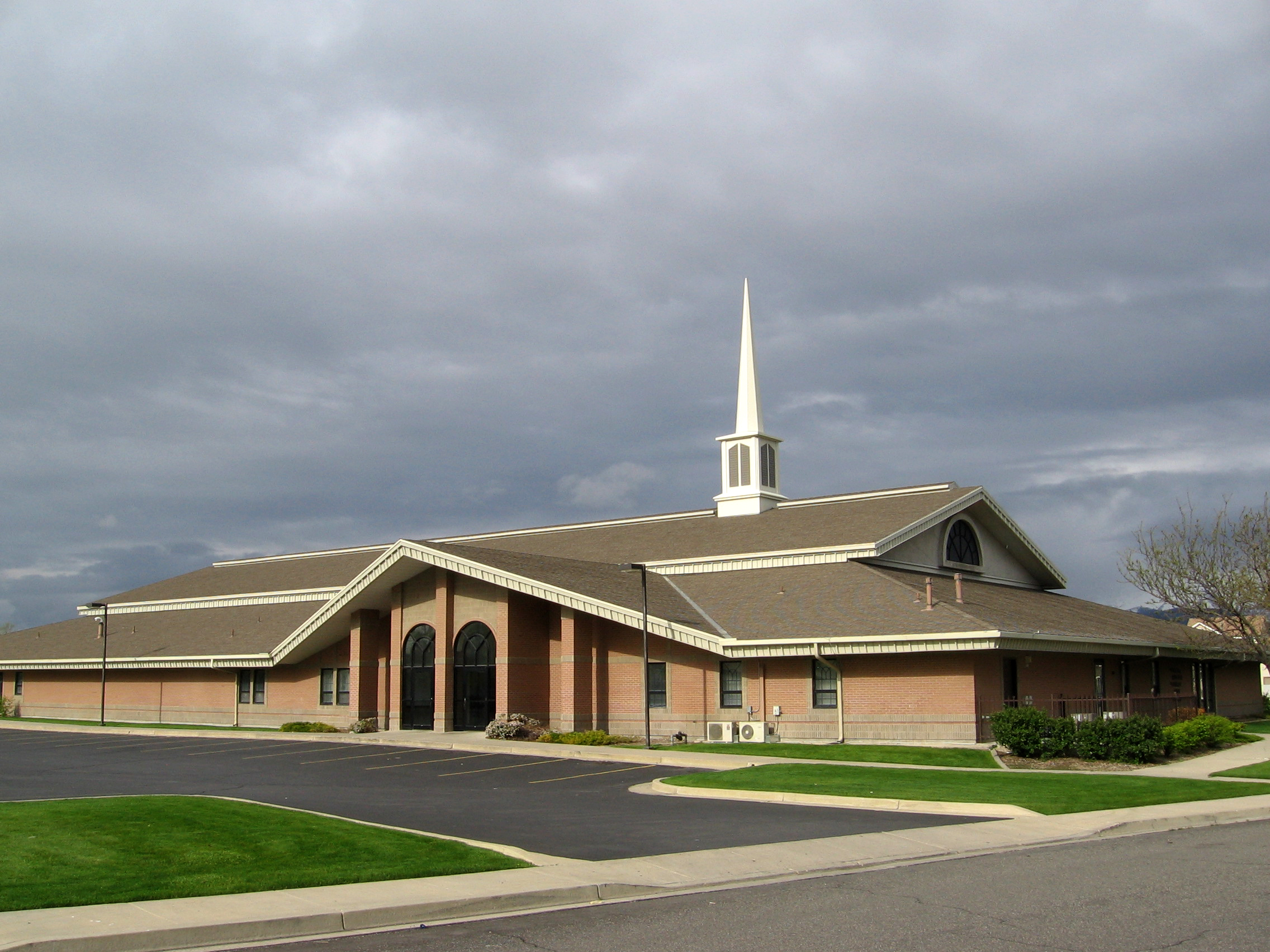
LDS stake center. Stake centers serve as meetinghouses for local congregations and headquarters for the local stake.

In each stake, one of the meetinghouses is designated the stake center. This building is usually the largest meetinghouse in the stake, but where stakes are large in area the stake center may be chosen because it is more centrally located in the boundaries of the stake. The stake center is where functions of the stake such as stake conferences, stake meetings, and stake activities are usually held. There are usually offices for conducting stake business in the stake center. During the mid-to-late 19th and early-20th century, in areas with larger LDS populations, stake tabernacles were used for most of the larger activities now performed at stake centers, while the stake offices were located in what was known as a stake house. In areas with fewer members and no stake tabernacle, a stake house was used like a modern stake center for both meetings and offices.

=== Districts ===
A church district is a geographical, administrative unit composed of a number of congregations called branches. A district is a subdivision of a mission of the church and in many ways is analogous to a church stake. The leader of a district is the mission president, who selects a local district president as his agent. The district president may choose two men to assist him; the three together form the district presidency.

== Community of Christ ==
The Community of Christ (previously the Reorganized Church of Jesus Christ of Latter Day Saints) eliminated the designation of "stake" as an administrative unit. The church is now organized into "mission centers".

== Strangites ==
Historically, the Strangites maintained stakes in Voree, Wisconsin; Kirtland, Ohio; and on Beaver Island, Michigan, but today the church has only a single stake in Voree.

== See also ==
- Area (LDS Church)
- Gathering (LDS Church)
- Latter Day Saint movement
- Parish
- The Church of Jesus Christ of Latter-day Saints membership statistics

== Additional reading ==
- Smith, Joseph Fielding (1973). Essentials in Church History. Deseret Book Company. ISBN 0-87747-081-2.
