= Nibley, Utah =

City in Utah, United States

- City
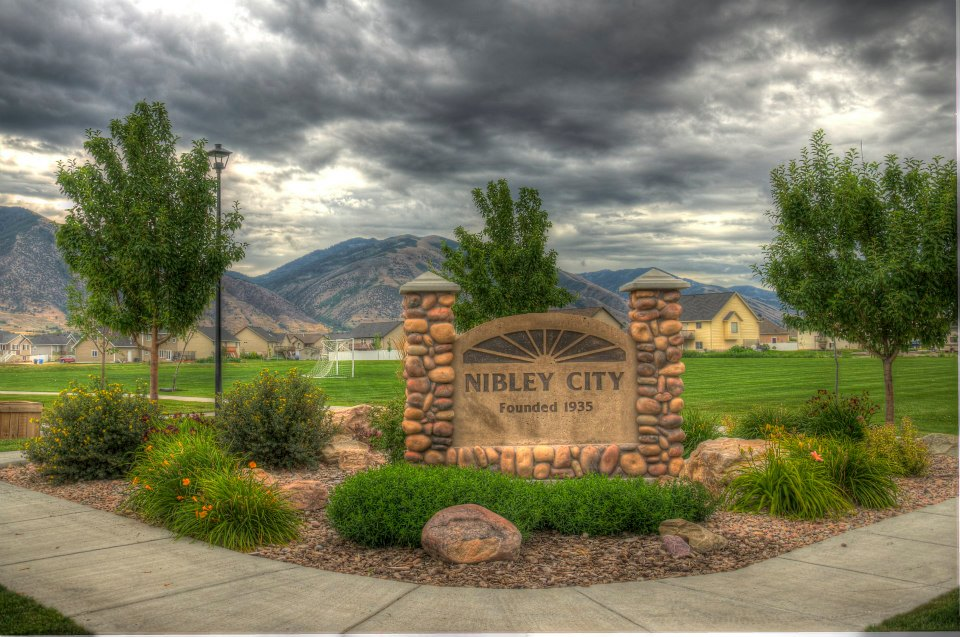
- City sign on 800 W

- Flag

- Location in Cache County and the state of Utah.
- Coordinates: 41°40′32″N 111°51′30″W
- Country: United States
- State: Utah
- County: Cache
- Settled: 1855
- Incorporated: 1935
- Named for: Charles W. Nibley

Government
  - Mayor: Larry Jacobsen

Area
  - Total: 4.39 sq mi (11.37 km^{2})
  - Land: 4.39 sq mi (11.37 km^{2})
  - Water: 0 sq mi (0.00 km^{2})
- Elevation: 4,551 ft (1,387 m)

Population (2020)
  - Total: 7,328
  - Density: 1,669/sq mi (644.5/km^{2})
- Time zone: UTC-7 (Mountain (MST))
  - Summer (DST): UTC-6 (MDT)
- ZIP code: 84321
- Area code: 435
- FIPS code: 49-54660
- GNIS feature ID: 2411253
- Website: Official website

Nibley is a city in Cache County, Utah, United States. Incorporated in 1935, it was named after Charles W. Nibley, a leader in the Church of Jesus Christ of Latter-day Saints. The population was 7,328 at the 2020 census. It is included in the Logan, Utah-Idaho (partial) Metropolitan Statistical Area and is a suburb or 'bedroom' community of Logan.

Historically a rural area, Nibley has experienced significant growth within the last decade, more than doubling its population in under 10 years.

== Geography ==
Nibley lies between the cities of Hyrum and Logan in the Cache Valley.

According to the United States Census Bureau, the city has a total area of 4.03 square miles, 10.4377 square kilometers, all land.

== Heritage Days ==
Nibley celebrates many events in the city that have drawn the community closer. They have an Easter egg hunt, a live nativity, and other holiday celebrations yearly. The most notable holiday celebration is Heritage Days.

"In 1984, Mayor Leishman called a committee together to organize a celebration for the city inviting all current and former residents of Nibley to join in the celebration. They decided to meet on a Saturday in June and called it Heritage Days. It was such a success that it was made an annual event." It has been held every year since that time and continues to grow each year.

Currently Heritage Days is held annually on the week of the fourth Saturday of June. Each year there is a parade made up of Nibley residents and other local business and organizations. Other events include a Mayor's Dinner, a five kilometer foot race, the Children's Theater, a petting zoo, dunking machine, bake off, beauty pageant, baby contest and other fun family events.

== Demographics ==
Historical population
Census	Pop.	Note	%±
1940	271		—
1950	304		12.2%
1960	333		9.5%
1970	367		10.2%
1980	1,036		182.3%
1990	1,167		12.6%
2000	2,045		75.2%
2010	5,438		165.9%
2020	7,328		34.8%
U.S. Decennial Census

=== 2020 census ===
As of the 2020 census, Nibley had a population of 7,328. The median age was 27.4 years. 39.6% of residents were under the age of 18 and 7.2% of residents were 65 years of age or older. For every 100 females there were 101.7 males, and for every 100 females age 18 and over there were 98.8 males.

98.0% of residents lived in urban areas, while 2.0% lived in rural areas.

There were 1,958 households in Nibley, of which 57.9% had children under the age of 18 living in them. Of all households, 80.7% were married-couple households, 6.5% were households with a male householder and no spouse or partner present, and 10.6% were households with a female householder and no spouse or partner present. About 8.1% of all households were made up of individuals and 3.0% had someone living alone who was 65 years of age or older.

There were 2,007 housing units, of which 2.4% were vacant. The homeowner vacancy rate was 0.3% and the rental vacancy rate was 8.6%.

Racial composition as of the 2020 census
Race	Number	Percent
White	6,267	85.5%
Black or African American	17	0.2%
American Indian and Alaska Native	50	0.7%
Asian	67	0.9%
Native Hawaiian and Other Pacific Islander	14	0.2%
Some other race	385	5.3%
Two or more races	528	7.2%
Hispanic or Latino (of any race)	983	13.4%

=== 2010 census ===
In the 2010 census, Nibley had a population of 5,540 people, and 1,351 households. Nibley City's population and households have more than doubled from 2000 to 2010. The population density was 1,350.7 people per square mile. The racial makeup of the city was 87.5% White; .2% Black; .5% American Indian and Alaska Native; .5% Asian; .2% Native Hawaiian and other Pacific Islander; 1.7% reporting two or more races; and 10.1% Hispanic or Latino.

Out of 1,351 households in Nibley 60.5% had children under the age of 18 living with them, 87.0% were married couples living together, 4.4% had a female householder with no husband present, 2.0% had a male household with no wife present, and 6.6% of household were nonfamily households. 6.0% of all households were made up of individuals, and 1.6% had someone living alone who was 65 years of age or older. The average household size was 3.75 people and the average family size was 3.92 people.

Forty-five point seven percent of the population was 0–19 years old; 4.4% were 20–24; 32.0% were 25–44; 13.6% were 45–64; and 4.3% were 65 and older. The median age was 24.8 and the city was 50.3% female.

The median household income was $63,423, while the mean household income was $69,168. The median family income was $65,104, and the mean family income was $70, 174. The per capita income for the city was $18,644. From 2007 to 2011 the percentage of people below the poverty level was 2.8% compared to the State of Utah average of 11.4%.

=== 2000 census ===
As of the 2000 census, there were 2,045 people, 566 households, and 516 families residing in the city. The population density was 616.1 inhabitants per square mile (237.9/km^{2}). There were 580 housing units at an average density of 174.8 per square mile (67.5/km^{2}). The racial makeup of the city was 96.67% White, 0.15% Native American, 0.39% Asian, 0.15% Pacific Islander, 1.27% from other races, and 1.37% from two or more races. Hispanic or Latino of any race were 3.86% of the population.

There were 566 households, out of which 59.4% had children under the age of 18 living with them, 84.5% were married couples living together, 5.8% had a female householder with no husband present, and 8.8% were non-families. 7.6% of all households were made up of individuals, and 2.8% had someone living alone who was 65 years of age or older. The average household size was 3.61 and the average family size was 3.82.

In the city, the population was spread out, with 38.4% under the age of 18, 10.4% from 18 to 24, 28.5% from 25 to 44, 18.2% from 45 to 64, and 4.4% who were 65 years of age or older. The median age was 26 years. For every 100 females, there were 103.3 males. For every 100 females age 18 and over, there were 99.8 males.

The median income for a household in the city was $52,273, and the median income for a family was $54,896. Males had a median income of $39,156 versus $21,463 for females. The per capita income for the city was $17,168. About 1.3% of families and 1.1% of the population were below the poverty line, including 1.1% of those under age 18 and none of those age 65 or over.

== See also ==
- List of cities and towns in Utah
