= Utah High School Activities Association =

Organization

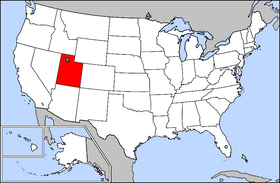
- Abbreviation: UHSAA
- Formation: 1927
- Legal status: Association
- Purpose: Athletic/Educational
- Headquarters: 199 East 7200 South; Midvale, UT 84047
- Region served: Utah
- Members: 138 high schools
- Executive Director: Rob Cuff
- Affiliations: National Federation of State High School Associations
- Staff: 8
- Website: uhsaa.org
- Remarks: (801) 566-0681

The Utah High School Activities Association (UHSAA) is an organization of 138 high schools in the U.S. state of Utah, that sponsor athletic activities in 25 sports and activities. More than 85,000 students compete annually in approximately 25,000 competitions among UHSAA member schools. The UHSAA is a member of the National Federation of State High School Associations (NFHS).

== Sponsored activities ==
=== Boys ===
- Baseball
- Basketball
- Cross Country
- Diving
- Football
- Golf
- Lacrosse
- Soccer
- Swimming
- Tennis
- Track
- Wrestling
- Volleyball

=== Girls ===
- Basketball
- Cross Country
- Diving
- Drill Team
- Golf
- Lacrosse
- Soccer
- Swimming
- Softball
- Tennis
- Track
- Volleyball
- Wrestling

=== Other activities ===
- Drama
- Music
- Speech and Debate (formerly Forensics)
- Esports
