= National Register of Historic Places listings in Bingham County, Idaho =

Location of Bingham County in Idaho

This is a list of the National Register of Historic Places listings in Bingham County, Idaho.

This is intended to be a complete list of the properties and districts on the National Register of Historic Places in Bingham County, Idaho, United States. Latitude and longitude coordinates are provided for many National Register properties and districts; these locations may be seen together in a map.

There are 18 properties and districts listed on the National Register in the county. More may be added; properties and districts nationwide are added to the Register weekly.

This National Park Service list is complete through NPS recent listings posted May 23, 2025.

== Current listings ==
	Name on the Register	Image	Date listed	Location	City or town	Description
1	Aviator's Cave	Aviator's Cave	July 22, 2010 (#09001224)	Grounds of Idaho National Laboratory; Address Restricted	Arco	
2	Blackfoot I.O.O.F. Hall	Blackfoot I.O.O.F. Hall	May 15, 1979 (#79000775)	57 Bridge St. 43°11′22″N 112°20′41″W	Blackfoot	
3	Blackfoot LDS Tabernacle	Blackfoot LDS Tabernacle	September 19, 1977 (#77000456)	120 S. Shilling St. 43°11′12″N 112°20′34″W	Blackfoot	
4	Blackfoot Railway Depot	Blackfoot Railway Depot	November 20, 1974 (#74000731)	130 NW Main St. 43°11′22″N 112°20′35″W	Blackfoot	Now houses the Idaho Potato Museum
5	Eastern Idaho District Fair Historic District	Eastern Idaho District Fair Historic District	August 10, 2001 (#01000864)	97 Park Dr. 43°11′45″N 112°20′23″W	Blackfoot	
6	Fort Hall Site	Fort Hall Site	November 21, 1974 (#74000732)	16 miles north of Fort Hall; 43°08′55″N 112°10′58″W	Fort Hall	Site of the second Fort Hall (1870-1883).
7	Idaho Republican Building	Idaho Republican Building	October 16, 1979 (#79000776)	167 W. Bridge St. 43°11′24″N 112°20′44″W	Blackfoot	
8	J.W. Jones Building	J.W. Jones Building	November 17, 1982 (#82000319)	104 Main St., NE. 43°11′23″N 112°20′38″W	Blackfoot	
9	Nels and Emma Just House		July 17, 2020 (#100005363)	995 Reid Rd. 43°15′51″N 112°06′08″W	Firth	
10	Lincoln Creek Day School	Lincoln Creek Day School	April 9, 2010 (#10000174)	Rich Lane, eight miles southeast of Idaho State Highway 91; 43°11′19″N 112°12′14″W	Blackfoot	
11	North Shilling Historic District	North Shilling Historic District	August 29, 1979 (#79000777)	N. Shilling Ave. 43°11′19″N 112°20′28″W	Blackfoot	
12	Nuart Theater	Nuart Theater	October 19, 1978 (#78001049)	195 N. Broadway; 43°11′27″N 112°20′38″W	Blackfoot	
13	Ross Fork Episcopal Church	Ross Fork Episcopal Church	January 3, 1983 (#83000277)	Mission Rd. 43°11′23″N 112°20′38″W	Fort Hall	
14	Ross Fork Oregon Short Lines Railroad Depot	Ross Fork Oregon Short Lines Railroad Depot	September 7, 1984 (#84001019)	Agency Rd. 43°01′47″N 112°25′51″W	Fort Hall	
15	St. Paul's Episcopal Church	St. Paul's Episcopal Church	May 15, 1979 (#79000778)	72 N. Shilling Ave. 43°11′17″N 112°20′29″W	Blackfoot	
16	Shilling Avenue Historic District	Shilling Avenue Historic District	August 18, 1983 (#83000278)	Shilling Ave. between E. Idaho and Bingham Sts. and Bridge and Judicial Sts. to Stout Ave. 43°11′13″N 112°20′32″W	Blackfoot	
17	Standrod Bank	Standrod Bank	August 30, 1979 (#79000779)	59 and 75 Main St., W. 43°11′22″N 112°20′40″W	Blackfoot	
18	US Post Office-Blackfoot Main	US Post Office-Blackfoot Main	March 16, 1989 (#89000128)	165 W. Pacific; 43°11′27″N 112°20′42″W	Blackfoot	

== Proposed or formerly listed ==
- Dubois Historic District, roughly bounded by E. Main, Court, S. Shilling, and Bingham Sts., Blackfoot, Idaho. Status changed October 4, 1982, reference number 82005189. Incorporated into Shilling Avenue Historic District, 1983.

== See also ==
- List of National Historic Landmarks in Idaho
- National Register of Historic Places listings in Idaho
