= Frank VanderSloot =

American businessman

Frank Vandersloot
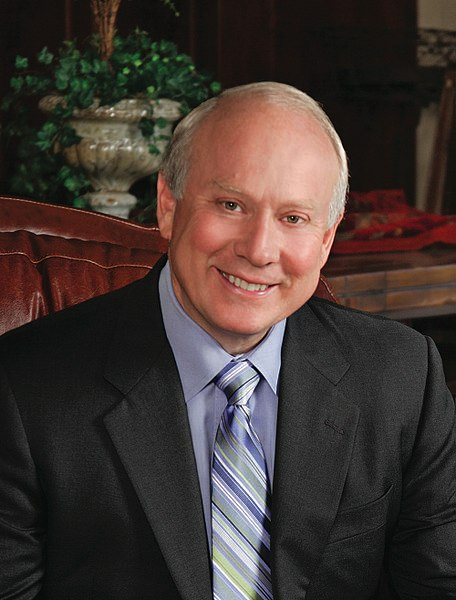
- Born: Frank Leonard VanderSloot; August 14, 1948 (age 78); Billings, Montana, U.S.
- Education: Ricks College (AA); Brigham Young University (BBA)
- Known for: Former CEO of Melaleuca, Inc.
- Spouses: Kathleen Zundel (divorced); Vivian VanderSloot (divorced); Belinda VanderSloot (m. 1995)

Frank Leonard VanderSloot (born August 14, 1948) is an American entrepreneur, radio network owner, rancher, and political campaign financier. He is the founder and former chief executive officer of Melaleuca, Inc. His other business interests include the Riverbend Ranch and Riverbend Communications. VanderSloot also serves on the board of directors and executive board of the U.S. Chamber of Commerce. In 2011, The Land Report listed him as the nation's 92nd largest landowner. In 2017, Forbes listed VanderSloot as the richest person in Idaho and the 302nd wealthiest American with a net worth of $2.7 billion.

VanderSloot served as a national finance co-chair for Mitt Romney's presidential campaigns in 2008 and 2012. He contributed $1.1 million and helped to raise between $2 million and $5 million for Romney's 2012 campaign. He is a significant financial contributor to Republican presidential candidates and Idaho political campaigns. He has also paid for advertising in opposition to several Idaho Democratic political candidates. VanderSloot is the primary financier of the American Heritage Charter School in Idaho Falls.

== Early life and education ==
VanderSloot was born on August 14, 1948, to Peter Francis (Frank) VanderSloot (1913–1982) and Margaret May Christensen Sindberg-Woodley VanderSloot (1915–2004). The family lived in Sheridan, Wyoming, and Hardin, Montana, before moving in 1949 to Cocolalla, Idaho, where they lived on a ranch. The elder VanderSloot worked as a painter for the Northern Pacific Railway.

Frank VanderSloot graduated from Sandpoint High School in 1966. At the age of 16, he joined the Church of Jesus Christ of Latter-day Saints (LDS Church), and later studied at Brigham Young University in Provo, Utah, where he worked and lived as a cleaner at a laundromat. After two semesters, he left school to serve a two-and-a-half-year LDS Mission in the Netherlands. Following his mission, he earned an associate's degree in business at Ricks College in Rexburg, Idaho. He then returned to Brigham Young University, where he earned a bachelor's degree in marketing in 1972.

== Career ==
=== ADP and Cox ===
After graduating from college, VanderSloot worked for 9 1/2 years at Automatic Data Processing in three cities. He first worked in sales and marketing before moving to general management and operations. He left ADP to work as regional vice president at Cox Communications in Vancouver, Washington.

=== Oil of Melaleuca, Inc ===
In September 1985, VanderSloot's brother-in-law Roger Ball and Roger's brother Allen Ball offered VanderSloot the helm of Oil of Melaleuca, Inc., a startup multi-level marketing business based in Idaho Falls. VanderSloot said "the company was a mess" when he arrived. According to Dan Popkey, "A supposed 80 percent corner on the tea tree market turned out to be 5 percent. The FDA came knocking, because salespeople were exaggerating medical claims. A multilevel model that lured people to buy $5,000 in inventory offended VanderSloot's sense of fairness." Oil of Melaleuca failed to achieve significant market share, and the partners shut down the company later in 1985. Half the legacy distributors from Oil of Melaleuca left after Melaleuca, Inc., was formed (below).

=== Melaleuca, Inc ===
In 1985, VanderSloot founded the multi-level marketing company Melaleuca Inc, which sells nutritional supplements, cleaning supplies, and personal-care products, and he has been president and chief executive officer ever since. Melaleuca operates internationally, with U.S. operations centered in Idaho Falls, Idaho, and Knoxville, Tennessee. Customers buy directly from Melaleuca's website or retail locations and "independent marketing executives" receive commissions from Melaleuca for each purchase made by people they refer and by people their customers refer, through seven "referral generations". The company refers to this arrangement as "Consumer Direct Marketing", a term it has trademarked.

According to a 2004 article by Phyllis Berman, Melaleuca's sales flattened in 1998, and VanderSloot "discovered that some senior directors were living off their residuals and doing little in the way of recruitment." This resulted in "a new policy that reduced payments to those who didn't either bring in new converts or help others do so." The company has large international operations, and 25 percent of its revenue comes from Taiwan, Korea, Japan, Australia, New Zealand, and the United Kingdom. Melaleuca reported gross sales in excess of one billion dollars in 2011 and $1.13 billion in 2012. In Idaho Falls, Melaleuca has a local workforce of about 2,000 employees.

VanderSloot says that the company has a "business model for those people who want to supplement their income." However, according to the US Federal Trade Commission study on multi-level marketing companies, fewer than 0.29% of Melaleuca distributors make any profit and more than 99% of distributors lost money. The FTC report goes on to note that the odds of winning from a single spin of the wheel in a game of roulette in Las Vegas are "22 times as great as the odds of profiting after enrolling as a Melaleuca distributor".

Melaleuca is a member of the United States Direct Selling Association, a trade association that engages in public relations and political lobbying on behalf of the multi-level marketing industry. In 2008, VanderSloot began a three-year term as one of the eight members of the Direct Selling Association's board of directors. In December 2009, VanderSloot and his wife contributed $10,000 to the Direct Selling Association's political action committee (PAC).

Between 1991 and 1997, Melaleuca was investigated by Michigan regulators, the Idaho attorney general's office, and the U.S. Food and Drug Administration for various marketing violations. In 1991 Melaleuca received a cease-and-desist order for violating Michigan's anti–pyramid scheme laws. In 1992, Melaleuca signed a consent decree with the states of Michigan and Idaho agreeing to "not engage in the marketing and promotion of an illegal pyramid." In 1997, the U.S. Food and Drug Administration sent Melaleuca a warning letter for "false and misleading" claims about two of its supplements. In a paper on multi-level marketing, the FTC notes that "Melaleuca fails to disclose that approximately 99% of all participants lose money and therefore get further behind financially because of their participation". In June 2020, the FTC sent a warning letter to Melaleuca regarding false and deceptive earnings claims during the COVID-19 pandemic that were unsubstantiated and inconsistent with earlier FTC findings that less than 1% of Melaleuca distributors realize any profit with the vast majority losing money.

=== Other businesses ===
==== Ranching ====
In 1993, VanderSloot founded Riverbend Ranch, one of the largest purebred ranches and largest commercial cattle operations in the United States. The ranch received 21 awards at the Utah State Fair between 1995 and 1997. The Ranch runs a genetics and breeding program and hosted the world's largest Angus bull sale in March 2012. According to Riverbend Ranch general manager David Brown, VanderSloot established its mission as "providing ranchers in the Intermountain West with the best genetics at an affordable price." Riverbend Ranch has operations in three other states, including Fort Ranch Quarter Horses, a horse ranch in Promontory, Utah.

==== Natural Guardian Land Holdings ====
In 1994, VanderSloot created Natural Guardian Limited Partnership (doing business as Natural Guardian, LLC, as of 2011), a holding company that owns or leases approximately 1,500 acres of land in Wolverine Canyon, Bingham County, Idaho.

==== Broadcasting ====
VanderSloot owns Riverbend Communications, a group of radio stations in Eastern Idaho. He purchased the company from Bonneville Communications in 2006. Riverbend Communications operates KLCE Classy 97, KCVI Kbear 101, KTHK 105.5 The Hawk, KFTZ Z103, KEII News-Talk AM 690 – 1260, and KNBL AM 1260.

==== Snake River Cheese factory ====
In 1994, VanderSloot was approached by two dairy farmers with a plea to invest in the Snake River Cheese factory in Blackfoot, Idaho, after Kraft Foods had announced a decision to close it. Kraft had operated the plant since the early 1920s. In response, VanderSloot bought a $1 million interest in the plant, and an investment company assumed control, but the operation closed anyway within six months. VanderSloot then paid off a $2 million debt the company owed to the dairymen, staffed the plant with his own personnel and supplemented the milking herd with two thousand head of cattle. He promised that all five hundred people whose jobs depended on the plant would remain employed and leased the plant to Beatrice Cheese, a subsidiary of ConAgra. In 1999, the facility netted $278 million in sales. The next year, VanderSloot sold his interest in the company to Suprema Specialties after Beatrice broke its lease. VanderSloot again promised that employees would keep their jobs. In 2006, the factory, which by then had been renamed as the Blackfoot Cheese Company, was sold to Sartori Foods, and in 2013, the plant was purchased from Sartori by Glanbia Foods, Inc.

==== Paving and construction ====
VanderSloot was the owner of HighStone (formerly Eagle Rock Construction; RBH Gravel; VIP Construction), an Idaho Falls-based asphalt construction and maintenance company. HighStone was the prime contractor on a $421,000 state government contract to repair a stretch of Idaho State Highway 33 in Idaho Falls, and worked on a road project in Rexburg. In September 2011, HighStone merged with DePatco, a family-owned heavy construction company in St. Anthony, Idaho. The merger created eastern Idaho's largest locally owned construction company.

=== Net worth ===
VanderSloot does not publicly disclose his personal worth; however, in 2004, Forbes magazine estimated that Melaleuca was worth $1.4 billion and that VanderSloot's share of the company (55 percent of the voting stock and 44 percent of the nonvoting stock), was worth $700 million. According to Dan Popkey of the Idaho Statesman, the company's value had grown to between $3.2 billion and $3.9 billion by 2011, and VanderSloot's net worth was estimated at more than $1 billion. In 2012, the Land Report listed VanderSloot as the 92nd largest landowner in the United States. In 2013, VanderSloot was listed by Business Insider as the wealthiest individual in the state of Idaho, with an estimated net worth of $1.2 billion. In 2017, VanderSloot was listed on the Forbes 400 as the 302nd wealthiest American with a net worth of $2.7 billion.

== Public activity ==
=== United States Chamber of Commerce ===
VanderSloot is on the board of directors and executive board of the United States Chamber of Commerce.

=== Taxation Task Force ===
In 1993, VanderSloot served on the Taxation Task Force of the White House Conference on Small Business.

=== Campaign financing ===
==== Mitt Romney for president ====
VanderSloot was one of 47 finance co-chairs for Mitt Romney's 2008 presidential campaign and served under eight finance chairs. He also served as a finance co-chair for Romney's 2012 presidential campaign. In 2012, VanderSloot's companies contributed $1.1 million to the Restore Our Future political action committee, which was supporting Romney for President. According to VanderSloot, he raised between $2 million and $5 million for the Romney campaign.

On April 20, 2012, a website operated by Barack Obama's presidential campaign included VanderSloot on a list of eight major donors to Romney's campaign whom it described as having "questionable and troubling records on various issues." The site said VanderSloot was "litigious, combative, and a bitter foe of the gay rights movement." VanderSloot made a series of television appearances, in some of which he called for donations to Romney in protest of the list. VanderSloot accused the Obama campaign of targeting him unfairly and said that he went through "living hell" as a result. He told Fox News host Bill O'Reilly that Melaleuca had lost about two hundred customers in the first two weeks after the Obama website's reference to him; Two days later, he told the Idaho Statesman that "unbelievable" and "unexpected" national support in the intervening period was turning out to be good for business.

In July 2012, VanderSloot said he was the subject of two new federal audits, one by the Internal Revenue Service and the other by the U.S. Department of Labor. VanderSloot had not been audited in the thirty-year period before the Obama campaign listing. VanderSloot said that the timing of the audits was curious and questionable, claiming that he received notice of the IRS audit two months after he was "singled out by the Obama campaign." He noted that he did not think that the President was directly behind the audits. Ultimately, the audits found no wrongdoing but VanderSloot paid $80,000 to defend himself during the audit process.

A number of commentators expressed disapproval of the campaign's depiction of VanderSloot. Three op-eds published by the Wall Street Journal criticized the campaign's treatment of VanderSloot and other top Romney donors. The critiques, two of which were authored by Wall Street Journal contributor Kimberley Strassel, were disputed by television host Rachel Maddow, Lewiston Morning Tribune editor Marty Trillhaase, and David Shere of Media Matters for America but were supported by the editorial page of National Review and Henry Reske of Newsmax. After the election, Mitt Romney described the Obama campaign's treatment of VanderSloot as "a very dangerous and troubling development". Tom McClintock complained about VanderSloot's treatment in a speech on the floor of the United States House of Representatives in May 2013, and Marco Rubio separately made a similar statement on the floor of the Senate.

==== 2016 presidential election ====
In June 2015, VanderSloot and his wife gave $50,000 to a political action committee (Conservative Solutions PAC) funding Florida senator Marco Rubio's campaign as the Republican Party nominee for the 2016 presidential election. VanderSloot also contributed $2,700, the maximum allowed by law, to the GOP presidential campaign of former technology executive Carly Fiorina. In November 2015, VanderSloot announced that he supported Rubio for president and that he planned to host fundraisers and bundle contributions on Rubio's behalf. In June 2016, VanderSloot said that he was ready to support Donald Trump as the "best bet" to defeat Hillary Clinton, and in September of that year Donald Trump Jr. made a private visit to VanderSloot at Melaleuca headquarters. Following the presidential election in November 2016, VanderSloot announced on Twitter that Trump was not his first, second, or third choice as a candidate but that it was "time for all of us to come together and unite behind our new president."

==== Idaho ballot measures ====
Vandersloot was the primary financial supporter of United Families Idaho Action Fund, a PAC that supported a successful anti-same-sex marriage constitutional amendment (House Joint Resolution 2) in Idaho 2006. Melaleuca was the top contributor to the PAC fund, giving $6,827 while VanderSloot and his wife contributed an additional $2,000. The amendment was struck down as unconstitutional in 2014.

VanderSloot spent $1.3 million in 2012 to sponsor television commercials and other advertising in favor of Propositions 1, 2, and 3, ballot referendums supporting education changes introduced and championed by Idaho public school supervisor Tom Luna in 2011. The three-part educational package, consisting of an eight-year $180 million program limiting teachers' collective bargaining rights, requiring online classes and mandating laptops for ninth-graders, was approved by the Idaho Legislature and was backed by Governor C.L. "Butch" Otter. An initiative campaign placed the approval of the laws on the ballot, and they were defeated in a statewide vote.

==== Idaho political and judicial campaigns ====
According to Dan Popkey of the Idaho Statesman and Roger Plothow and Marty Trillhaase of the Idaho Falls Post Register, VanderSloot supported Idaho Democrat Larry EchoHawk's 1994 gubernatorial campaign and endorsed Democrat Jackie Groves Twilegar for Idaho state controller in 2006. VanderSloot has been a major donor to Idaho Republicans, according to Popkey, who described him as the state's "most boisterous conservative financier" and by America Online's Eamon Murphy, who called him "perhaps the single most influential campaign donor" in the state of Idaho.

VanderSloot spent more than $100,000 on independent advertising on three winning judicial campaigns, two for Idaho Supreme Court and one for district judge in Bonneville County. VanderSloot and Melaleuca were financial supporters of the PAC Concerned Citizens for Family Values. The PAC ran ads targeting incumbent Idaho Supreme Court Justice Cathy Silak during her 2000 re-election campaign against challenger Daniel T. Eismann. The ads alleged that if Silak were re-elected, same-sex marriage and "partial-birth abortion" could have become legal in Idaho.

In 2002, VanderSloot and Melaleuca contributed more than $50,000 opposing the election bid of Democrat Keith Roark, a former Blaine County prosecutor, for Idaho Attorney General. The contributions included a $35,000 donation to Roark's Republican opponent, Lawrence Wasden, and a $16,500 donation to Concerned Citizens for Family Values, an organization run by VanderSloot, to pay for attack ads against Roark in Eastern Idaho. That year, VanderSloot and Melaleuca also donated $7,000 towards Republican Dirk Kempthorne's 2002 gubernatorial campaign .

In 2006, VanderSloot and his wife, Belinda, donated nearly $16,000 through the PAC Citizens for Truth and Justice, and via direct payments for ads opposing the reelection of Idaho 7th District Court Judge James Herndon, a Democrat, in a three-way race against challengers Darren Simpson and DaLon Esplin. Ads criticizing Herndon also aired on radio stations run by Riverbend Communications, owned by VanderSloot and his wife.

In 2010, VanderSloot funded two PACs that launched last-minute ads against Idaho 2nd District Judge John Bradbury, a Democrat, during his electoral run for state Supreme Court against Republican incumbent Justice Roger Burdick. VanderSloot donated $19,000 to the PAC Idaho Citizens for Justice and financed the PAC Citizens for Commonsense Solutions. Idaho Secretary of State Ben Ysursa announced that the PACs were fined $1,900 collectively for failing to appoint a certified treasurer prior to accepting contributions from VanderSloot and for failing to disclose large expenditures for its ads before the election, as required by law.

=== LGBT issues ===
In 1999, VanderSloot sponsored billboards around Idaho asking "Should public television promote the homosexual lifestyle to your children? Think about it!" in reference to It's Elementary, a 1999 PBS documentary exploring how four schools dealt with homosexuality. VanderSloot's wife Belinda donated $100,000 to the Proposition 8 initiative to rescind gay marriage in California, and volunteers used Melaleuca's call center after hours to persuade California voters to support the measure.

In 2006, VanderSloot took out two full-page advertisements in the Idaho Falls Post Register criticizing a series of investigative articles by journalist Peter Zuckerman in the Post Register concerning incidents of child molestation by a Boy Scout director in the Grand Teton Council. The advertisements caused media controversy for allegedly outing Zuckerman, drawing criticism from television political commentator Rachel Maddow, Glenn Greenwald in Salon magazine, the editorial page of the Boise Weekly, Post Register editor Dean Miller, and Zuckerman himself.

The first advertisement stated that Zuckerman had "declared to the public that he is a homosexual" in an article for Point South, and that the local community and radio station had been "speculating" that Zuckerman's sexual orientation may have motivated him "to attack the scouts and the LDS Church" because of the Scouts' ban on gay scout leaders and the Church's opposition to gay marriage. The advertisement stated that "it would be very unfair for anyone to conclude that is what is behind Zuckerman's motives"; an analysis by Glenn Greenwald in Salon asserted that "the ad absurdly sought to repudiate the very 'speculation' about Zuckerman which it had just amplified." A second advertisement suggested that Zuckerman, as a "gay rights advocate" and "homosexual reporter," had "a personal ax to grind" because of the Scouts' ban on gay scout leaders.

VanderSloot denied that he had outed Zuckerman, saying that he had attempted to defend Zuckerman's motives, and repeating that Zuckerman had previously publicly disclosed his sexual orientation, which was already being discussed in the local community. Post Register editor Dean Miller stated that Zuckerman's sexual orientation had been known only by Zuckerman's family and a few of his close friends and colleagues, and Zuckerman himself also disputed VanderSloot's contention that the advertisements did not constitute an outing.

VanderSloot stated in 2012 that "gay people should have the same freedoms and rights as any other individual" and in 2013 that he supports equal rights for gay people but believes that the definition of marriage is a union between a man and a woman.

=== Legal action ===
On February 17, 2012, columnist Glenn Greenwald of Salon wrote that, over time, VanderSloot had threatened to bring what Greenwald termed "'patently frivolous' lawsuits against his political critics" and had made threats of "expensive defamation actions" against sources (including Forbes, Mother Jones magazine, and Salon) who had published critical views of his public statements regarding gay rights and Melaleuca's business practices; he had previously made similar demands of local political blogs in Idaho. On her show of September 28, 2012, Rachel Maddow stated that VanderSloot and his attorneys requested that she remove from Web archives a show in which she reported and commented on his alleged outing of Zuckerman; she said that he also objected when she publicized that request on her show.

In January 2013, VanderSloot filed a defamation lawsuit against Mother Jones magazine and two of its employees, seeking nearly $75,000 in damages, alleging that the magazine depicted him as a "gay-basher" in a February 2012 article titled "Pyramid-like Company Ponies Up $1 Million for Mitt Romney" and in two tweets promoting the article. In October 2015, the court granted summary judgment in favor of the defendants, finding that "all of the statements at issue are non-actionable truth or substantial truth", although the judge also criticized the magazine's reporting in the article as "non-objective" and "biased."

In May 2014, VanderSloot filed a defamation lawsuit against former Idaho Falls Post-Register reporter Peter Zuckerman, alleging that he had "knowingly and maliciously publishing false statements depicting VanderSloot in national media as a gay-basher." The case settled in October 2015 after Zuckerman admitted in a sworn affidavit that statements he made about VanderSloot were untrue.

== Philanthropy ==
In 2003, VanderSloot founded the Melaleuca Foundation, a private 501(c)(3) non-profit corporation. The Melaleuca Foundation has been a financial contributor to the Santa Lucia Children's Home (Hogar Santa Lucia), an orphanage in Quito, Ecuador. In 2005, VanderSloot flew to Baton Rouge to deliver supplies to shelters after Hurricane Katrina and helped three displaced families with transportation issues. In 2007, VanderSloot's company Melaleuca received the Salvation Army Others Award for helping with relief efforts following Hurricane Katrina.

In February 2012, VanderSloot Farms purchased a property from the Idaho Falls School District 91 for $121,000. VanderSloot financed renovations of a building on the site, the New Sweden School, which had been listed on the National Register of Historic Places, and donated the entire parcel to the American Heritage Charter School. Inaugurated in August 2013, the charter school is modeled after the North Valley Academy in Gooding, Idaho, and bases its curriculum on the Core Knowledge Program established by E.D. Hirsch.

== Awards ==
In 1998, VanderSloot received the Idaho Business Leader of the Year award from Idaho State University. In 2001, he was awarded the Ernst & Young Entrepreneur of the Year Award for the U.S. Northwestern region. He was inducted into the Idaho Hall of Fame in 2007 and received the Idaho Hometown Hero medal in 2011. VanderSloot received the Horatio Alger Award and became a lifetime member of the Horatio Alger Association of Distinguished Americans in 2015. He was named fifth on the list of "100 Influential Idahoans of 2015" by the Ridenbaugh Press. VanderSloot was presented the Patriot Award in 2015 by the Department of Defense's Employer Support of the Guard and Reserve (ESGR) for his support of soldiers.

== Personal life ==
VanderSloot resides in Idaho Falls, Idaho, with his wife, Belinda VanderSloot (née Boyack), whom he married in 1995. Together they have fourteen children: six from Frank VanderSloot's two prior marriages, and eight from Belinda VanderSloot's first marriage. VanderSloot was previously married to Kathleen VanderSloot (née Zundel) and to Vivian VanderSloot, his second wife.
