= KEII =

- Blackfoot, Idaho; United States
- Broadcast area: Idaho Falls-Pocatello, Idaho
- Frequency: 690 kHz
- Branding: Cannonball 101

Programming
- Format: Variety hits

Ownership
- Owner: Frank L. VanderSloot; (Riverbend Communications, LLC)
- Sister stations: KCVI; KNBL; KFTZ; KLCE; KTHK

History
- First air date: 1951
- Last air date: 2024
- Former call signs: KBLI (1951–1991); KECN (1991–2001); KZNR (2001–2004); KSLJ (2004–2006); KBLI (2006–2014)

Technical information
- Licensing authority: FCC
- Facility ID: 71780
- Class: D
- Power: 1,000 watts day; 43 watts night
- Translators: 92.7 K224EL (Pocatello); 101.1 K266BY (Pocatello); 101.1 K266AF (Pocatello)

Links
- Public license information: Public file; LMS
- Webcast: Listen live
- Website: cannonball101.com

KEII (690 AM) was a commercial radio station in Blackfoot, Idaho, broadcasting to the Idaho Falls-Pocatello area. The station aired a variety hits format branded as Cannonball 101. KEII was a division of Frank L. VanderSloot's Riverbend Communications LLC.

== History ==
KEII was first licensed, as KBLI, in 1951, to the Blackfoot Broadcasting Company, with 250 watts on 1490 kHz. In 1957 the station moved to 690 kHz, and in 1991 the call letters were changed to KECN.

=== Expanded Band assignment ===
On March 17, 1997, the Federal Communications Commission (FCC) announced that eighty-eight stations had been given permission to move to newly available "Expanded Band" transmitting frequencies, ranging from 1610 to 1700 kHz, with KECN authorized to move from 690 to 1620 kHz. The expanded band station was assigned the call letters KBLI on November 10, 1997.

The FCC's initial policy was that both the original station and its expanded band counterpart could operate simultaneously for up to five years, after which owners would have to turn in one of the two licenses, depending on whether they preferred the new assignment or elected to remain on the original frequency, although this deadline was extended multiple times. It was ultimately decided to remain on the original frequency, and the license for KBLI on 1620 kHz was cancelled on February 7, 2006.

=== Later history ===
The call letters of the original station on 690 kHz were changed to KZNR in 2001, and KSLJ in 2004. Following the deletion of the expanded band operation on 1620 kHz in 2006, the KBLI call sign was returned to 690 kHz. On October 21, 2014, the call letters became KEII.

On October 1, 2016, KEII, along with simulcast partner KEIR (1260 AM) in Idaho Falls, replaced most of their talk radio programming with a Mormon-focused Christian adult contemporary format; they continued to air The Dave Ramsey Show. The music programming on "Sunny AM 1260/690" was similar to that heard on Sounds of Sunday, a syndicated program carried on sister station KLCE. On September 10, 2018, KEII and KEIR (under new KNBL calls) changed their format to variety hits, branded as "Cannonball 101".

The FCC cancelled the station's license on September 4, 2025.

== Translators ==
Call sign	Frequency	City of license	FID	ERP (W)	Class	Transmitter coordinates	FCC info
K224EL	92.7 FM	Pocatello, Idaho	141125	250	D	43°10′3.7″N 112°22′10.9″W	LMS
K266BY	101.1 FM	Pocatello, Idaho	146523	99	D	42°52′25.6″N 112°30′49.9″W	LMS
K266AF	101.1 FM	Pocatello, Idaho	71784	250	D	43°21′5.6″N 112°0′24.8″W	LMS
