= Lincoln Creek Day School =

- Lincoln Creek District; Bingham County, Idaho; United States

Information
- Established: 1937
- Closed: 1944
- Lincoln Creek Day School
- U.S. National Register of Historic Places
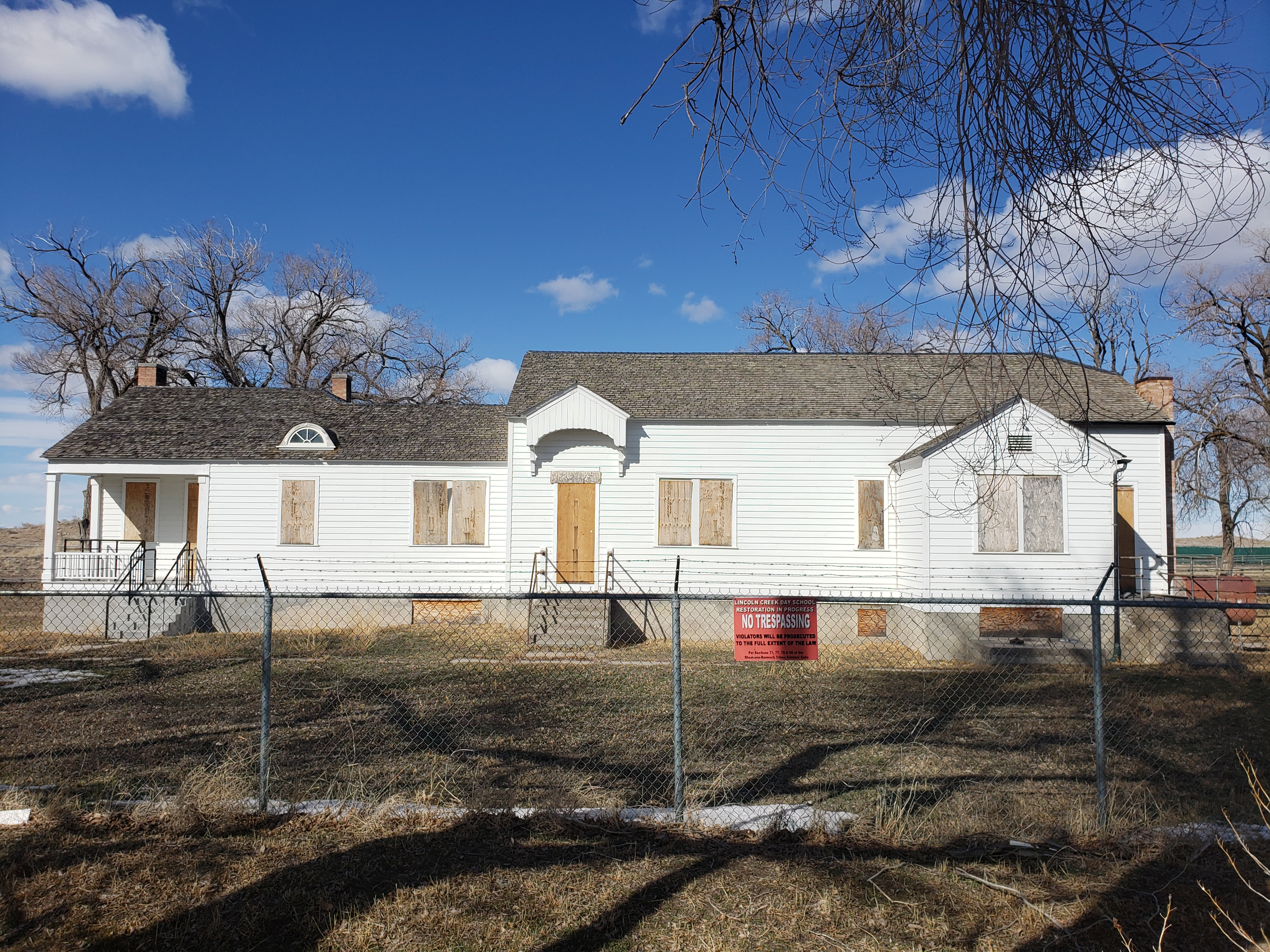

- Location within Idaho Location within the United States
- Nearest city: Blackfoot, Idaho
- Coordinates: 43°11′19″N 112°12′14″W
- Area: 1 acre (0.40 ha)
- Built: 1937
- Architectural style: Colonial Revival
- NRHP reference No.: 10000174
- Added to NRHP: April 9, 2010

The Lincoln Creek Day School near Fort Hall, Idaho on the Fort Hall Indian Reservation was built in 1937 in the Colonial Revival style. It was listed on the U.S. National Register of Historic Places on April 9, 2010.

== Description ==
The School is a one-story frame building facing Rich Lane, a major road in the Lincoln Creek District of Fort Hall Indian Reservation. The building is situated by a large, open area surrounded by trees. It sits on a concrete foundation rising three feet above ground level, allowing light to enter the basement through a light well on the north side. Above this height, the walls are lap sided. The building's exterior consists mainly of original materials, although all doors and windows are missing because of vandalism. The openings have since been covered with plywood to impede further damage to the interior. The roof, covered in wood shingles, features eyebrow dormers and provides only minimal overhang.

The building is visually and structurally divided into two portions: the school section and the teacher's quarters. The school portion of the building, measuring 21 feet wide and 52 feet long, is situated over a full basement. The teacher's quarters sits over a crawlspace. The school portion has two entrances. The first is a primary public entrance with a stoop, covered by a projecting overhang. The second opens into what was once the Teacher Room, which juts off the main part of the building. A third door once accessed the original Boys' Toilet; however, it has since been filled in with a window and siding.

The teacher's quarters is visually separated from the school portion of the edifice by a lower roof and a stepped-back front wall from the dominant face of the building. It has two entrances; the first is off a recessed entry porch built into the structure's southwest corner, and the other is a back door reached via concrete steps. Nine windows once allowed natural light in the residence. The teachers' quarters also features a stepped-brick chimney and an eyebrow dormer with tin metal roofing.

Of the north side of the building is a single car garage with a concrete floor on its north side. The garage doors from the structure's initial construction have been removed, and only one of the four upper interior wall portions has retained its original plaster finish.

The edifice's interior has been almost completely stripped of all wall and ceiling finishes, wiring, trim, cabinetry, and fixtures. Some lath-and-plaster and interior trim remain, but the ceilings and walls have been stripped down to the wooden studs. The first-floor schoolroom was converted into a large gathering area and basketball court, resulting in the original ceiling being removed and the rafters being exposed. Some of the original tongue-and-groove maple flooring still remains in this room. The interior stairway that originally allowed access between the schoolroom and the basement was later rendered unusable when the schoolroom floor was extended over it to allow more for playing basketball; also, a loft was constructed over the bathrooms. Two windows were added on either side of an existing attic vent to provide additional light.

The basement under the school portion can be entered by a concrete stair on the structure's east elevation or by another stair from the school's first floor. There is a large room with wood support columns running down the center, and support areas on the east end that were remodeled into a furnace area and bathrooms. A chimney was added to the structure for the furnace, covering a first-floor window. Some plaster remains on the basement's concrete walls, as does the door and window trim. Surprisingly, its windows have also remained intact.

== History ==
The Lincoln Creek Day School was opened in 1937. It was one of three such schools constructed on the Fort Hall Indian Reservation because of the Indian Reorganization Act (IRA) of 1934. These schools were built to replace the controversial boarding schools and foster the formerly suppressed native cultures.

The Treaty of Fort Bridger, signed in 1868, obligated the government to provide the reservation with a school building and teacher. However, it took four years for funds to be appropriated for the program. These early boarding schools attempted to take Native American children out of the cultures they had grown up in, indoctrinate them into Christianity, and ground them in the ways of Anglo-American life. Parents had little say in their children's education. These schools were underfunded, allowing starvation and disease to run rampant, and children were often abused under school faculty. The reservation's first school closed by March 1876 because of cuts to an already tight budget. An attempt to establish a day school was undertaken in 1879, but only 22 children out of the reservation's 300 attended.

Special Indian Agent J. M. Haworth made plans for a second boarding school, which was created by Agent John Wright nearly 20 miles from the center of the reservation in September 1879. In April 1887, Agent A. J. Gallagher reported that the buildings were dilapidated, dead livestock had been found in the springs that supplied the school's water, and 38 children were locked in a dormitory at night with no way to escape in the event of a fire. Gallagher, however, was primary concerned about the low enrollment.

Another agent, S. G. Fisher, was so determined to increase enrollment that he enlisted the Fort Hall police to enforce attendance, even to the point of physical fighting with parents. Understandably, a number of officers resigned. 10 children died in the 1891 scarlet fever epidemic, with the disease spurred on by the cramped dormitory conditions; however, attendance was still forced, and the school's attendance was up to 186 in December 1892. Fisher was very unpopular with the reservation's occupants, as was Agent Thomas Teter. In 1895 an attempt by 20 Native American men to scalp him for personally taking Indian children out of their tepees was hindered by the Fort Hall police.

Families still were resisting their children's enrollment around the start of the 20th century. After a 14-year-old bride was enrolled in the school but later reclaimed by her husband, many girls claimed they were married in an effort to escape the establishment. Children at home were tried to keep hidden, and enrolled children had a habit of attempting to run away. Two minors even attempted suicide in 1901. Although larger buildings were provided in 1904, the woeful conditions of the school were still present for several decades.

The IRA was passed in 1934, providing for day schools that would eventually replace the boarding school, keep children in their homes, and foster their native identity and culture. Three schools were in the works for the reservation by 1934: Ross Fork, Banner Creek, and Lincoln Creek. All three were opened in 1937.

Lincoln Creek's curriculum taught the traditional subjects along with "practical skills," such as sewing and pottery for girls and manual art and carpentry for boys. Special emphasis was placed on hygiene and health, important because of an epidemic of trachoma outbreaks. However, whether done purposely or not, there is evidence that the curriculum was trying to acculturate the children to white society in addition to providing them with cultural education.

Although the day schools met with enthusiasm from the community, attendance was low. In October 1940, Bannock Creek and Ross Creek both had 30 students attending, while Lincoln Creek had only 10. The schools with the highest attendances were the local public schools: Pocatello, with 82; and Blackfoot, with 75.

Budget problems forced the closure of Bannock and Lincoln Creek Schools in 1946 and 1944, respectively. Modifications to the Native American educational policies following World War II resulted in the closure of the remaining day schools, when the majority of Native American children were attending local public schools.

After use as a basketball court and standing many years of without use, the Lincoln Creek Day School was listed of the National Register of Historic Places on April 9, 2010. It has been repeatedly vandalized and is in a dilapidated state; however, the structure is being renovated and will eventually house a community center.
