= KBLI =

KBLI may refer to:

- The ICAO airport code for Bellingham International Airport near Bellingham, Washington
- The former call sign for KEII, a radio station in Blackfoot, Idaho broadcasting at 690 AM
