= List of census-designated places in Idaho =

Map of the United States with Idaho highlighted

This article lists census-designated places (CDPs) in the U.S. state of Idaho. As of 2020, there were a total of 36 census-designated places in Idaho.

== Census-designated places ==
CDP	Population	County
Arbon Valley	666	Power
Avimor	1,255	Ada
Banks	22	Boise
Bennington	236	Bear Lake
Blanchard	379	Bonner
Bruneau	121	Owyhee
Conkling Park	73	Kootenai
Coolin	138	Bonner
De Smet	145	Benewah
Elk City	170	Idaho
Fernwood	337	Benewah
Fort Hall	3,195	Bannock and Bingham
Gannett	174	Blaine
Garden Valley	377	Boise
Groveland	982	Bingham
Hammett	332	Elmore
Hidden Springs	3,076	Ada
Laclede	434	Bonner
Letha	161	Gem
Lincoln	4,556	Bonneville
Lowman	44	Boise
Moreland	1,264	Bingham
Mountain Home AFB	3,191	Elmore
Murphy	96	Owyhee
Parkline	60	Benewah
Princeton	193	Latah
Riverside	930	Bingham
Robie Creek	1,193	Boise
Rockford	291	Bingham
Rockford Bay	325	Kootenai
Silverton	594	Shoshone
Smiths Ferry	63	Valley
Sweetwater	155	Nez Perce
Tyhee	1,130	Bannock
Viola	135	Latah
Yellow Pine	32	Valley

== See also ==
- List of cities in Idaho
- List of places in Idaho
