= Fort Hall (disambiguation) =

Fort Hall was a 19th-century outpost in eastern Oregon Country (now Idaho) in the United States

Fort Hall can also refer to:

- Fort Hall, the colonial name of Murang'a, a small town in central Kenya
- Fort Hall Indian Reservation, a Native American reservation of the Shoshoni and Bannock people in Idaho
- Fort Hall, Idaho, a census-designated place
