= Sawtooth City, Idaho =

Unincorporated community in the state of Idaho, United States

- Sawtooth City
- U.S. National Register of Historic Places
- U.S. Historic district
- Location within Idaho Location within the United States
- Location: Blaine County, Idaho
- Nearest city: Stanley, Idaho
- Coordinates: 43°53′48″N 114°50′25″W
- Built: 1879
- NRHP reference No.: 75000625
- Added to NRHP: April 4, 1975

Sawtooth City (also Sawtooth) is an abandoned mining camp in Blaine County, Idaho, United States. Located at 43°53′48″N 114°50′25″W (43.8965718, -114.8403490), it sits at an altitude of 7,342 feet (2,238 m), along Beaver Creek near its confluence with the Salmon River in the Sawtooth Valley of Sawtooth National Recreation Area. Sawtooth City was founded after a mine was opened in the area on July 2, 1878; discoveries in the Sawtooth City area grew out of discoveries to the south. Its peak was between the years 1880 and 1886. A community cemetery is located northeast of the camp site.

In 1975, the entire community was added to the National Register of Historic Places as a historic district.

Most of the remaining structures were destroyed in the 2022 Ross Fork Fire.
