= Mount Putnam =

Mount Putnam may refer to:

- Mount Putnam (Idaho)
- Mount Putnam (Vermont)
