= Blackfoot LDS Tabernacle =

Historic church in Idaho, United States

- U.S. National Register of Historic Places
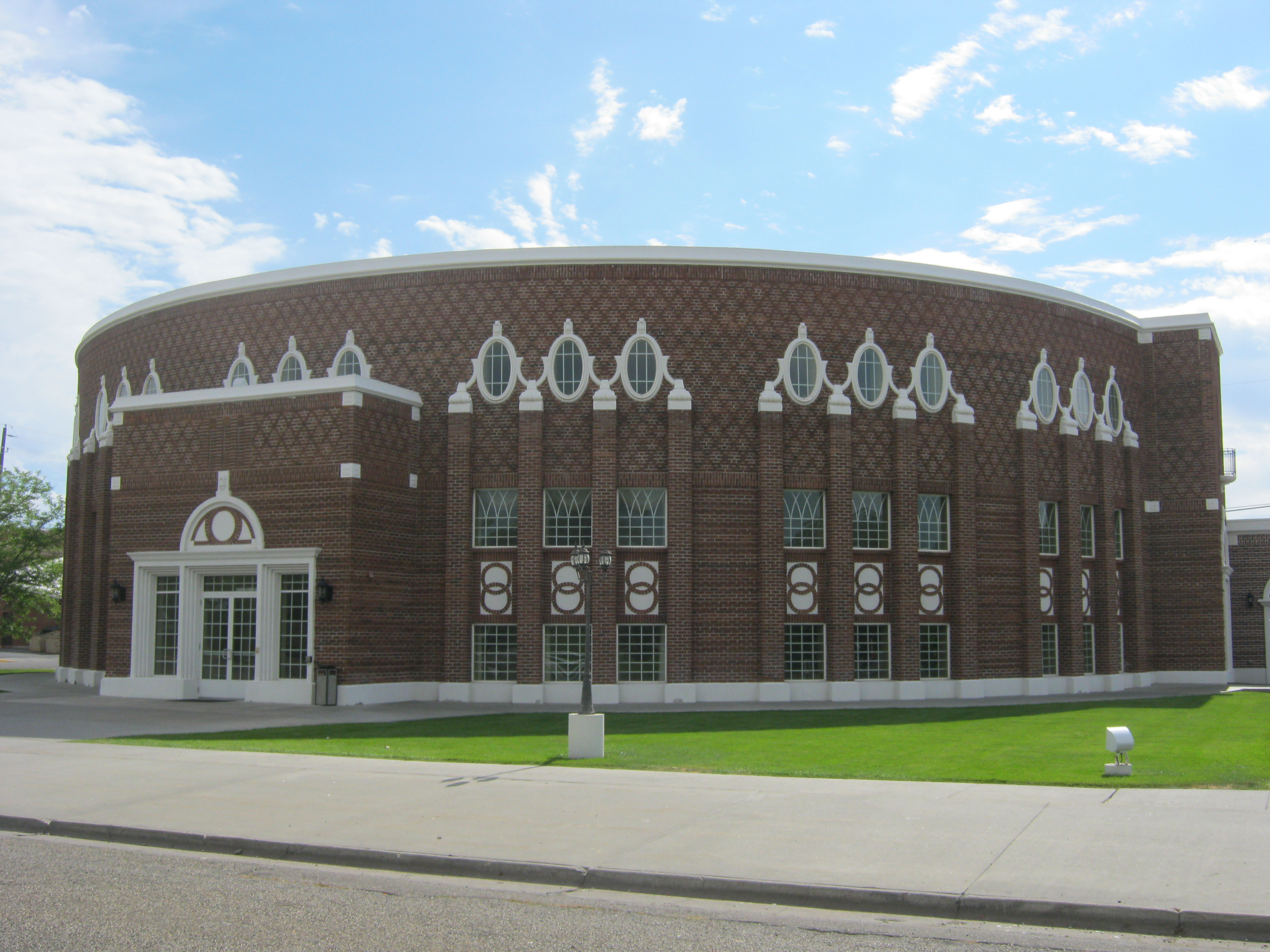

- Location within Idaho Location within the United States
- Location: 132 S. Shilling St., Blackfoot, Idaho
- Coordinates: 43°11′12″N 112°20′34″W
- Built: 1921
- Architect: Hyrum Pope & Harold W. Burton
- NRHP reference No.: 77000456
- Added to NRHP: September 19, 1977

The Blackfoot LDS Tabernacle, also known as the Blackfoot Tabernacle or South Blackfoot Stake Tabernacle, is a building located in Blackfoot, Idaho that formerly served as a tabernacle for large gatherings of members of the Church of Jesus Christ of Latter-day Saints. The tabernacle was designed by architects Hyrum Pope and Harold W. Burton and completed in 1921. The building was listed on the National Register of Historic Places in 1977. In 1980 the church sold the building to the city of Blackfoot. It was used as a civic auditorium until the 1990s and sat until 2003. In 2003 local business owner Perry Hawker bought it and it now functions as the Hawker Funeral Home.

== See also ==
- List of National Historic Landmarks in Idaho
- National Register of Historic Places listings in Bingham County, Idaho
