= KNBL =

- Idaho Falls, Idaho; United States
- Broadcast area: Idaho Falls, Idaho
- Frequency: 1260 kHz
- Branding: Farm Country 1260

Programming
- Format: Farm and classic country

Ownership
- Owner: Frank VanderSloot; (Riverbend Communications, LLC)
- Sister stations: KLCE; KTHK; KFTZ; KCVI

History
- First air date: 1947 (as KIFI at 1400)
- Former call signs: KIFI (1947–1963); KTEE (1963–1991); KICN (1991–2001); KZNI (2001–2004); KSSL (2004–2006); KBLY (2006–2014); KEIR (2014–2018)
- Former frequencies: 1400 kHz (1947–1958)
- Call sign meaning: "Cannonball" (previous format)

Technical information
- Licensing authority: FCC
- Facility ID: 71775
- Class: D
- Power: 5,000 watts day; 64 watts night
- Transmitter coordinates: 43°31′14.69″N 111°59′35.89″W

Links
- Public license information: Public file; LMS

KNBL (1260 AM) is a radio station broadcasting a farm and classic country format. Licensed to Idaho Falls, Idaho, United States, the station serves the Idaho Falls–Pocatello area. The station is owned by Frank VanderSloot's Riverbend Communications, LLC.

== History ==
The station went on the air as KIFI in 1947 and changed its call sign to KTEE in 1963. On February 22, 1991, the station changed its call sign to KICN, on November 12, 2001, to KZNI, on May 12, 2004, to KSSL, on April 20, 2006, to KBLY, and on October 21, 2014, to KEIR.

On October 1, 2016, KEIR, along with simulcast partner KEII (690 AM) in Blackfoot, replaced most of their talk radio programming with a Mormon-focused Christian adult contemporary format; they continued to air The Dave Ramsey Show. The music programming on "Sunny AM 1260/690" was similar to that heard on Sounds of Sunday, a syndicated program carried on sister station KLCE.

On August 1, 2018, the station changed its call sign to the current KNBL. On September 10, 2018, KNBL changed its format to variety hits, branded as "Cannonball 101"; the station continued to simulcast with KEII.

The station went silent in June 2024. Ahead of the expiration of its license, KNBL returned to the air in late June 2025 with separate programming from KEII and K266AF: a farm news and classic country format branded as "Farm Country 1260".
