= Fyans =

Fyans is a surname. Notable people with the surname include:

- Foster Fyans (1790–1870), British Army soldier, penal colony administrator, and public servant
- J. Thomas Fyans (1918–2008), American Mormon leader

== See also ==
- Fyan
