= Rockford Bay, Idaho =

Census-designated place in Kootenai County, Idaho, United States

- Census-designated place
- Location of Rockford Bay in Kootenai County, Idaho.

- Location of Rockford Bay Rockford Bay (the United States)
- Coordinates: 47°30′19″N 116°52′43″W
- Country: United States
- State: Idaho
- County: Kootenai

Area
  - Total: 3.775 sq mi (9.78 km^{2})
  - Land: 3.775 sq mi (9.78 km^{2})
  - Water: 0 sq mi (0 km^{2})
- Elevation: 2,264 ft (690 m)

Population (2010)
  - Total: 184
  - Density: 48.7/sq mi (18.8/km^{2})
- Time zone: UTC-8 (Pacific (PST))
  - Summer (DST): UTC-7 (PDT)
- Area codes: 208, 986
- GNIS feature ID: 2585592

Rockford Bay is a census-designated place in Kootenai County, Idaho, United States. Rockford Bay is located on Rockford Bay of Coeur d'Alene Lake, 12.5 miles (20.1 km) south-southwest of Coeur d'Alene. As of the 2020 census, Rockford Bay had a population of 325.

== Demographics ==
Historical population
Census	Pop.	Note	%±
2020	325		—
U.S. Decennial Census

== See also ==
- List of census-designated places in Idaho
