= Rockford, Idaho =

Census-designated place in Bingham County, Idaho, United States

- Census-designated place
- Location of Rockford in Bingham County, Idaho.

- Location of Rockford in Idaho Location of Rockford in the United States
- Coordinates: 43°11′21″N 112°31′50″W
- Country: United States
- State: Idaho
- County: Bingham

Area
  - Total: 1.110 sq mi (2.87 km^{2})
  - Land: 1.110 sq mi (2.87 km^{2})
  - Water: 0 sq mi (0 km^{2})
- Elevation: 4,462 ft (1,360 m)

Population (2020)
  - Total: 291
  - Density: 262/sq mi (101/km^{2})
- Time zone: UTC-7 (Mountain (MST))
  - Summer (DST): UTC-6 (MDT)
- Area codes: 208, 986
- GNIS feature ID: 2585591

Rockford is a census-designated place in Bingham County, Idaho, United States. Its population was 291 as of the 2020 census.

== Demographics ==
Historical population
Census	Pop.	Note	%±
2010	276		—
2020	291		5.4%
U.S. Decennial Census

== See also ==
- List of census-designated places in Idaho
