= Blackfoot I.O.O.F. Hall =

- U.S. National Register of Historic Places
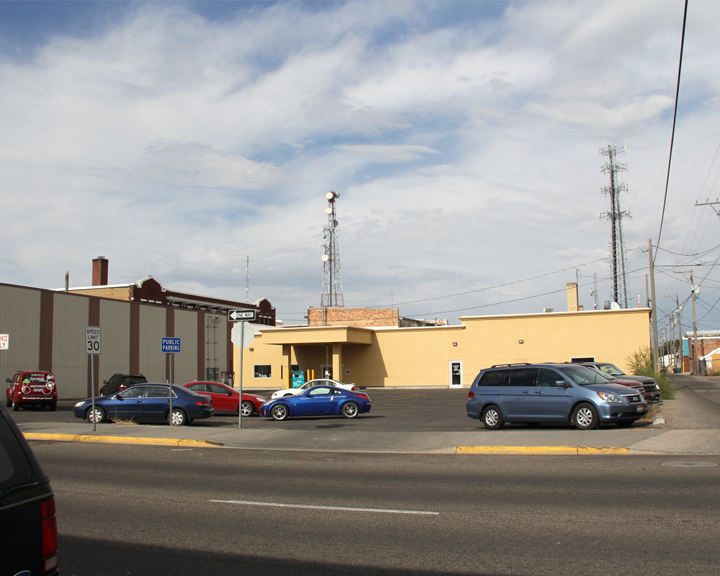

- Location within Idaho Location within the United States
- Location: 57 Bridge St., Blackfoot, Idaho
- Coordinates: 43°11′22″N 112°20′41″W
- Area: less than one acre
- Built: 1905
- NRHP reference No.: 79000775
- Added to NRHP: May 15, 1979

The Blackfoot I.O.O.F. Hall, at 57 Bridge St. in Blackfoot, Idaho, was built in 1905.

Its rear wall shows rough lava-rock structural fabric, while the front, brick facade is refined and survives about storefronts on the ground level.

Entrance to the second floor Odd Fellows meeting hall is by stairway from the rear.
