= Shilling Avenue Historic District =

Historic district in Idaho, United States

- U.S. National Register of Historic Places
- Location: Shilling Ave. between E. Idaho and Bingham Sts. and Bridge and Judicial Sts. to Stout Ave., Blackfoot, Idaho
- Area: 25 acres (10 ha)
- Architectural style: Mixed (more than two styles from different periods)
- NRHP reference No.: 83000278
- Added to NRHP: August 18, 1983

The Shilling Avenue Historic District is a 25 acres (10 ha) historic district in Blackfoot, Idaho. It was listed on the National Register of Historic Places in 1983. It included 26 contributing buildings.

Location: Shilling Ave. between E. Idaho and Bingham Sts. and Bridge and Judicial Sts. to Stout Ave. Blackfoot, ID Architect: Multiple Architecture: Mixed (more Than 2 Styles From Different Periods) Other names: 0710791653 Historic function: Education; Domestic; Religion Historic subfunction: Religious Structure; Single Dwelling; Multiple Dwelling; School Criteria: event, event, architecture/engineering, architecture/engineering, person, person

It includes:

- Fred T. Dubois House (1891), 320 East Main, a two-story frame residence. It was built as home of Fred T. Dubois shortly after he was elected to his first term in the U.S. Senate.

The NRHP document mentions Dubois Historic District as if it was the draft name of the district.

Also, "The Shilling Avenue Historic District incorporates a previously listed historic district, the North Shilling Historic District."
