= Fort Hall Indian Reservation =

Indian reservation in Idaho, U.S.

Coordinates: 42°57′52″N 112°21′59″W

Fort Hall Reservation Pohoko’ikkatee
- Indian reservation
- Location of Fort Hall Indian Reservation
- Tribe: Shoshone-Bannock
- Country: United States
- State: Idaho
- County: Bingham, Power, Bannock, and Caribou

Area
  - Total: 2,110.51 km^{2} (814.87 sq mi)
- Website: Shoshone-Bannock Tribes

The Fort Hall Reservation is the Indian reservation of Shoshone-Bannock Tribes in Idaho. The reservation is Pohoko’ikkatee in the Shoshone language. This is one of five federally recognized tribes in the state. The reservation is located in southeastern Idaho on the Snake River Plain about 20 miles (32 km) north and west of Pocatello. It comprises 814.874 sq mi (2,110.51 km^{2}) of land area in four counties: Bingham, Power, Bannock, and Caribou. To the east is the 60-mile-long (97 km) Portneuf Range; both Mount Putnam and South Putnam Mountain are located on the Fort Hall Reservation.

Founded by the Fort Bridger Treaty Council of 1868, the reservation is named for Fort Hall, a trading post in the Portneuf Valley that was established by European Americans. It was an important stop along the Oregon and California Trails in the middle 19th century. It is home to Shoshone and Bannock peoples.

A monument on the reservation marks the former site of the fort. Interstate 15 serves the community of Fort Hall, the largest population center on the reservation. The total population of the reservation was 5,762 at the 2000 census. The Shoshone-Bannock Tribes have more than 5,300 enrolled members, and more than half reside on the Fort Hall Reservation. Others have moved to urban areas for work. The tribes are governed by a seven-member elected council and maintain their own governmental services, including law enforcement, courts, social and health services, and education.

The four other federally recognized tribes in the state are the Coeur d'Alene, Kootenai, Nez Perce, and Shoshone-Paiute at Duck Valley Indian Reservation.

In July 2016, the Department of Interior made offers to 536 landowners with fractional interests at Fort Hall Reservation for buy-back of lands valued at $11 million in offers. This was under its Land Buy-Back Program as part of the government's settlement of the Cobell v. Salazar class action suit. The land purchased under the program is transferred into trust for the Shoshone-Bannock Tribes, to restore its traditional land. About 1.5 million acres of land has been put into trust for tribes under this program.

== History ==
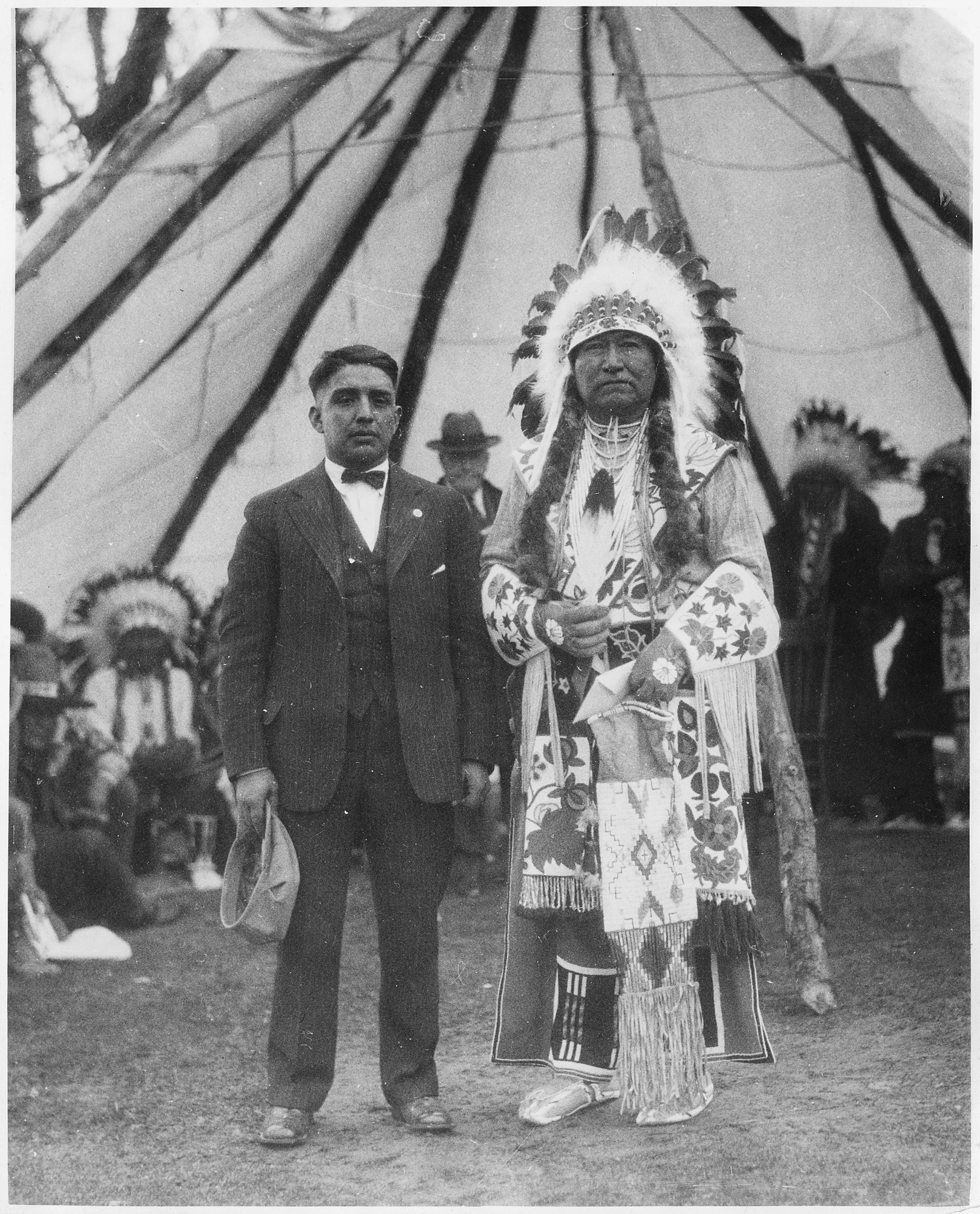
Translator George LaVatta and Chief Tendoi at the Fort Hall Reservation circa 1923

The Shoshone and Bannock had long occupied the territory of Idaho and nearby areas. They were not disrupted by settlers until the late 1840s and 1850s, when emigrant wagon trains increasingly crossed their territory which put strain on food and water resources, disrupting the way of life for the Shoshone and Bannock.

In the 1850s the Shoshone, led by Chief Pocatello, attacked emigrant parties in an effort to drive them off, as the settlers encroached on their hunting grounds and game. After initial hostilities, the Mormons, led by Brigham Young, pursued a policy of reconciliation with the Shoshone.

But other settlers complained, and the federal government ordered the U.S. Army into the Utah Territory in 1858, resulting in full-scale conflict between the U.S. and the Shoshone. There had been escalating conflicts, with the Shoshone and Bannock tribes pitted against the increasing tide of European-American settlers. The latter encroached on the Native Americans' traditional territory, competing for resources and damaging the habitat of game they depended on.

In January 1863 Colonel Patrick Edward Connor led his troops from Fort Douglas to chastise the Shoshone. In what is known as the Bear River massacre (1863), his US Army forces killed more than 400 Shoshone, including women and children, in present-day southeastern Idaho.

Warned of Connor's advance, Pocatello had led his people out of harm's way. Another chief and his band were attacked and largely destroyed.

Seeing the power of US forces, Pocatello subsequently sued for peace and agreed to relocate his people in 1868 to a newly established reservation along the Snake River. Four bands of Shoshone and the Bannock band of the Northern Paiute relocated to the reservation, then consisting of 1.8 million acres (7,300 km^{2}) of land. As part of the Fort Bridger Treaty of 1868, the U.S. government agreed to supply the Shoshone-Bannock tribes annually with goods and supplies annuities worth 5,000 dollars.

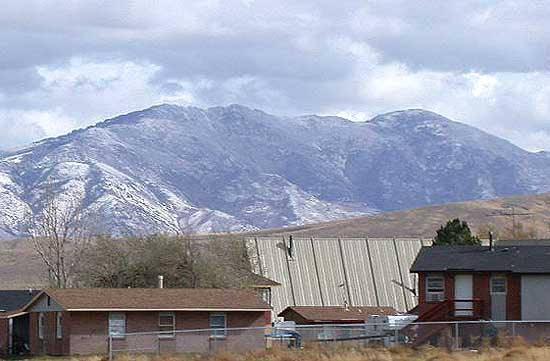
Houses in the town of Fort Hall, with Mount Putnam in the background

The U.S. government often failed to provide the annuity goods on time, and food supplies sometimes arrived spoiled. In addition, the lands of the reservation, located on the Snake River Plain, were not appropriate for the subsistence-type agriculture that the government wanted the Shoshone-Bannock to adopt. In the years following their removal to the reservation, the Shoshone-Bannock peoples suffered severely from hunger and disease, with high mortality. Hoping to relieve his people's suffering, Pocatello led a small group to a missionary farm in the Utah Territory to receive mass baptism and conversion to Mormonism. Although the Shoshone were baptized, the local settlers, primarily Mormon, agitated for removal of the Indians. The U.S. Army forced the Shoshone back onto the reservation.

From 1868 to 1932, the federal government reduced the territory of the reservation by two-thirds, taking some for such projects as railroads and roads, and allowing non-Native settlers to encroach on the grounds. Most importantly, under the Dawes Act of 1887, the government attempted to impose the model of private property and subsistence farming, thinking to encourage assimilation of the tribes to the majority type farm. It registered all members of the tribes and allotted individual 160-acre plots of land to each household. Given the arid local conditions, these allotments were generally too small to support subsistence agriculture. The government declared the remainder of the formerly communal land to be "surplus" and sold much of it to European-American settlers. Some members of the tribes later sold their plots because they were too small to be successfully farmed, leading to the tribes' losing control of more lands.

== 20th century to present ==
Map of the Shoshone-Bannock tribal territory and neighboring tribes in Idaho.

In 1934 during the Franklin D. Roosevelt administration, the US Congress passed the Indian Reorganization Act, created in part to end the allotment process and encourage tribes to re-establish self-government and to stabilize their land bases. In 1936 these two tribes reorganized, wrote a common constitution and established their own elected government. They have managed to retain most of their lands since that time.

During World War II, however, the US government assumed control of a 3,300-acre tract within the reservation, which it developed for use as an air base. Federal officials had told the tribe they would return the land to them after the war.

Instead, the federal government sold the property for $1 to nearby Pocatello, a city about 9 miles (14 km) to the east, which developed it as a regional airport. In the 21st century, there continue to be conflicts over development at the airport without consultation with the tribe. (See material below).

FMC Corporation operated a phosphate mine and plant under a lease at the Fort Hall Reservation. Between 1949 and 2001, it produced an estimated 250 million pounds of elemental phosphorus annually. It has had serious adverse environmental effects. In 1989, as part of what is termed the Eastern Michaud Flats Contamination, its 1500-acre plant site was designated by EPA under CERCLA as a Superfund site because of extensive water and land pollution caused by these operations, including degradation of the Portneuf River. The J.R. Simplot Company also operated on and near the reservation for decades. Their sites have been designated by the EPA as Superfund sites. Although some mitigation has been accomplished, scientists estimate the pollution will be hazardous for a very long time.

As a result of this case, EPA has worked with the Tribes to develop the Clean Air Act’s Tribal Authority Rule, to provide tribes with more control over enforcement of clean air quality. The company abandoned the plant and related mine, due in large part to increased costs of electricity and competition from cheaper Chinese phosphate. Seventeen mines in the region have been designated as Superfund sites because of selenium poisoning. Since 2001, FMC has been working on cleanup at the reservation. The tribe has developed its own expertise in air, water and land quality, but its resources are still seriously threatened by the extensive cleanup needed.

The Shoshone-Bannock Tribes chose to participate in the Department of Interior's Native Nations Land Buy-Back Program, established after 2009 as part of the government's settlement of the Cobell v. Salazar class action suit over mismanagement of fee/lease accounts. Under this program, the government is buying back fractional interests in lands within reservations to put the land into trust for the communal use of the tribes. It is an effort to restore some of the lands lost following the 19th century allotment process and reduce fractional holdings too small to use readily.

In July 2016, the Department of Interior made offers to 536 landowners with fractional interests at Fort Hall Reservation for buy-back of lands valued at $11 million. In total by July 2016, the Department of Interior had put about 1.5 million acres of land into trust for tribes under this program.

Relations with the city of Pocatello became strained in April 2016 after the tribes learned that the city had contracted with Pocatello Solar, based in Boise, to lease a new property at the airport. The tribe was consulted by FAA officials, who are handling the environmental assessment for the project, but they learned that the company was prohibited by the city from entering into any written agreement with the tribes. They are worried about getting stuck with an operation that could cause environmental damage.

== Economy ==
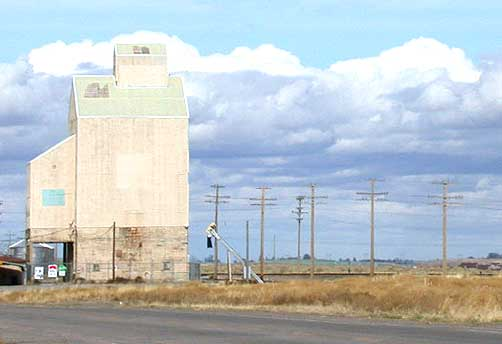
Grain elevator on the Fort Hall Indian Reservation

In the 21st century, the tribes employ nearly 1,000 Native and non-Native people in various trades: 575 in tribal government, 85 by the enterprises, and more than 300 in gaming. Since the late 20th century, the Tribes have developed the Fort Hall Casino and two smaller satellite casinos on the reservation. They are all operated by the Shoshone-Bannock Tribes, who use the revenues for additional economic development and to support education and healthcare for the people. The combined payroll of the various activities is more than $32 million. The tribal government is building the economy and ensuring the protection and enhancement of the reservation landbase for generations to come.

The main agricultural crops are wheat and potatoes, with the value of crops produced on the reservation exceeding $75 million annually.

== District Communities ==
- Bannock Creek (Saigwi'ogwai')
- Fort Hall Townsite (Botoode)
- Gibson (Bohogoi')
- Lincoln Creek
- Ross Fork

== See also ==
- Battle of Kelley Creek
