= Cocolalla, Idaho =

Unincorporated community in Idaho, United States

- Unincorporated community
- Location within Idaho Location within the United States
- Coordinates: 48°06′29″N 116°37′03″W
- Country: United States
- State: Idaho
- County: Bonner
- Elevation: 2,221 ft (677 m)

Population
  - Total: 985
  - Density: 22/sq mi (8.5/km^{2})
- Time zone: UTC-8 (Pacific (PST))
  - Summer (DST): UTC-7 (PDT)
- ZIP code: 83813
- Area codes: 208, 986
- GNIS feature ID: 396313

Cocolalla is an unincorporated community in Bonner County, Idaho, United States. Cocolalla is located on the south shore of Cocolalla Lake 12 miles (19 km) south-southwest of Sandpoint. The community is served by U.S. Route 95. Cocolalla has a post office with ZIP code 83813. The meaning of Cocolalla is not clear: one source states it is from a Coeur d'Alene Salish word meaning "very cold"; another source states it is an English derivation of a Coeur d'Alene Salish word meaning “deep water.”

== Notable Person ==
Frank L. VanderSloot, Founder and CEO of Melaleuca.
