= Riverside, Bingham County, Idaho =

Census-designated place in Bingham County, Idaho, United States

Riverside, Idaho
- Census-designated place
- Location in Idaho Location in the United States
- Coordinates: 43°11′48″N 112°26′08″W
- Country: United States
- State: Idaho
- County: Bingham

Area
  - Total: 2.145 sq mi (5.56 km^{2})
  - Land: 2.145 sq mi (5.56 km^{2})
  - Water: 0 sq mi (0 km^{2})
- Elevation: 4,459 ft (1,359 m)

Population (2020)
  - Total: 930
  - Density: 430/sq mi (170/km^{2})
- Time zone: UTC-7 (Mountain (MST))
  - Summer (DST): UTC-6 (MDT)
- Area codes: 208, 986
- FIPS code: 16-68230
- GNIS feature ID: 2585584

Riverside is a census-designated place in Bingham County, Idaho, United States. Its population was 930 as of the 2020 census.

== Demographics ==
Historical population
Census	Pop.	Note	%±
2010	838		—
2020	930		11.0%
U.S. Decennial Census

== See also ==
- List of census-designated places in Idaho
