= J. Thomas Fyans =

American Mormon leader (1918–2008)

Emeritus General Authority
- September 30, 1989 – May 18, 2008
- Called by: Ezra Taft Benson

First Quorum of the Seventy
- October 1, 1976 – September 30, 1989
- Called by: Spencer W. Kimball
- End reason: Granted general authority emeritus status

Presidency of the First Quorum of the Seventy
- October 1, 1976 – October 6, 1985
- Called by: Spencer W. Kimball
- End reason: Honorably released

Assistant to the Quorum of the Twelve Apostles
- April 6, 1974 – October 1, 1976
- Called by: Spencer W. Kimball
- End reason: Position abolished

Personal details
- Born: John Thomas Fyans; May 17, 1918; Moreland, Idaho, United States
- Died: May 18, 2008 (aged 90); Salt Lake City, Utah, United States

John Thomas Fyans (May 17, 1918 – May 18, 2008) was a general authority of the Church of Jesus Christ of Latter-day Saints (LDS Church) from 1974 until his death.

== Early life ==
Born in Moreland, Idaho, Fyans was the son of Joseph Fyans and Mae Farnsworth. From 1940 to 1943, Fyans served as a missionary in the Spanish American Mission of the LDS Church, which had jurisdiction over missionary work among the Spanish-speaking population of the southwestern United States. After his returned from his mission he married Helen Cook, and they eventually became the parents of five children.

== Employment ==
Prior to becoming a mission president Fyans worked at ZCMI for 20 years eventually becoming the head of their school supply department. After returning from serving as a mission president he returned to ZCMI but later accepted full-time employment with the church.

Fyans was a director and eventually president of the Memorial Estates Security Corporation (MESC) in the 1960s. Along with Bruce R. McConkie and several others, the company was formed to construct memorial parks for deceased "loved ones". The company went bankrupt, and was sued by investors for failing to register with the U.S. Securities and Exchange Commission as an investment company, misrepresenting LDS Church endorsement, and failing to inform investors of insolvency. On April 25, 1969, MESC settled with investors three days prior to the beginning of a jury trial.

Prior to his call as a general authority, Fyans worked as director of distribution and translation for the LDS Church. This is the position he held in 1967. He then served as an administrator with the office of the church's presiding bishop and in March 1972 became the managing director of the church's internal communications department.

== Church service ==
Fyans served as the bishop of the Butler Ward in Salt Lake City. He then served for nine years as a counselor in the presidency of the East Jordan Stake, which was headquartered in Midvale, Utah.

During the time he was a full-time church employee, Fyans was also a regional representative for the Quorum of the Twelve Apostles. While serving as director of internal communications, Fyans was involved with the initial steps of developing the LDS Church's edition of the King James Bible.

Fyans served as president of the Uruguayan Mission of the church from 1960 to 1964. As the president of this mission, Fyans also oversaw missionary work in Paraguay. While mission president Fyans oversaw a shift from most branches in Uruguay and Paraguay being led by full-time missionaries to having local men lead them.

Fyans also served as the coordinator for the area conferences in Manchester, England; Mexico City; Munich, Germany; and Stockholm, Sweden.

== General authority ==
In 1974, Fyans became an Assistant to the Quorum of the Twelve Apostles. He held this position until 1976, when the position of Assistant to the Twelve was discontinued. At this time, Fyans remained a general authority and was transferred to the First Quorum of the Seventy. He served in the latter position until 1989, when he was given general authority emeritus status. From 1976 to 1985, he was a member of the Presidency of the Seventy; from 1983 to 1985, he was the senior member of the presidency.

For part of 1978, Fyans worked as the executive director of the Genealogy Department of the church.

Fyans served for a time as president of the South America South Area of the church. He was released as one of the presidents of the seventy to take on this assignment. He also served as president of the Utah North and Utah Central Areas of the church.

Fyans became the president of the St. George Utah Temple in 1992. He died at his home in Salt Lake City.
