= Arch L. Madsen =

Founder of Bonneville International and a president of KSL

Arch L. Madsen (December 4, 1913 – April 7, 1997) was the founder of Bonneville International and a president of KSL. He was a recipient of the Peabody Award, the Distinguished Service Award from the National Association of Broadcasters, and the "Giant in Our City" award from the Salt Lake Area Chamber of Commerce.
