= St. Paul's Episcopal Church (Blackfoot, Idaho) =

Historic church in Idaho, United States

- U.S. National Register of Historic Places
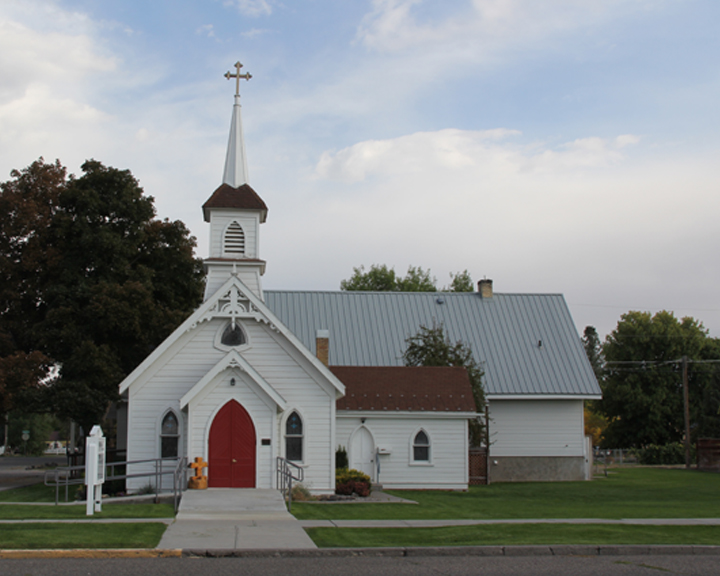

- Location within Idaho Location within the United States
- Location: 72 N. Shilling Ave., Blackfoot, Idaho
- Coordinates: 43°11′17″N 112°20′29″W
- Area: less than one acre
- Built: 1891
- Built by: Hopkins, R.H.
- Architect: Van Winkle, C.W.C.
- Architectural style: Late Gothic Revival
- NRHP reference No.: 79000778
- Added to NRHP: May 15, 1979

St. Paul's Episcopal Church is a historic church at 72 N. Shilling Avenue in Blackfoot, Idaho. It was started in 1891 and was added to the National Register in 1979. It is a small wood frame Late Gothic Revival church. Its nave is approximately 18 by 30 feet (5.5 m × 9.1 m) in plan.

It is one of Blackfoot's oldest buildings. It was the first church building in the Mission of the Holy Innocents, one of eight Idaho missions organized by Daniel Tuttle. It was designed by Hailey architect C.W.C. Van Winkle and was built for $1675 by Blackfoot builder R. H. Hopkins.

The congregation is part of the Episcopal Diocese of Idaho. In 2015, the church reported 65 members; in 2023, it reported 10 members. No membership statistics were reported in 2024 national parochial reports. Plate and pledge financial support reported by the church in 2024 was $16,287. Average Sunday Attendance (ASA) reported in 2024 was six persons. This was a relative decrease on ASA of 19 reported in 2016
