= Ross Fork =

Coordinates: 42°59′10″N 112°33′59″W

- Location within the United States

Location
- Country: United States
- State: Idaho

Ross Fork is a tributary stream of the Snake River in Bannock and Bingham counties in the U.S. state of Idaho. It flows into Clear Creek, which joins the Snake River at the American Falls Reservoir.

The watershed of the creek drains almost entirely within the Fort Hall Indian Reservation, located in southeastern, Idaho. Although once a perennial stream throughout its reach, the creek normally dries up late in the summer. White Bryonia, an exotic plant with poisonous berries and sometimes called the English mandrake, has infested places along the stream. The stream also has issues with erosion. Flows are mostly influenced by spring run off and irrigation diversions managed by the Bureau of Indian Affairs as part of the Fort Hall Irrigation Project. The stream also supports genetically pure strains of Yellowstone cutthroat trout. Some of the best examples of the intact Oregon Trail exist along the creek.

== See also ==
- List of rivers of Idaho
