= Groveland, Idaho =

Census-designated place in Bingham County, Idaho, United States

- Census-designated place
- Location of Groveland in Bingham County, Idaho.

- Location in Idaho Location in the United States
- Coordinates: 43°13′25″N 112°22′16″W
- Country: United States
- State: Idaho
- County: Bingham

Area
  - Total: 2.297 sq mi (5.95 km^{2})
  - Land: 2.297 sq mi (5.95 km^{2})
  - Water: 0 sq mi (0 km^{2})
- Elevation: 4,492 ft (1,369 m)

Population (2020)
  - Total: 982
  - Density: 428/sq mi (165/km^{2})
- Time zone: UTC-7 (Mountain (MST))
  - Summer (DST): UTC-6 (MDT)
- Area codes: 208, 986
- GNIS feature ID: 2585572

Groveland is a census-designated place in Bingham County, Idaho, United States. Its population was 982 as of the 2020 census.

The community was named for the groves of trees near the original town site.

== Demographics ==
Historical population
Census	Pop.	Note	%±
2010	877		—
2020	982		12.0%
U.S. Decennial Census

== See also ==
- List of census-designated places in Idaho
