= Fyan =

Fyan is a surname of Irish origin. Notable people with the surname include:

- Loleta Fyan (1894–1990), American librarian
- Robert Washington Fyan (1835–1896), American politician and soldier

== See also ==
- Fyans
- Ryan (surname)
