= Conkling Park, Idaho =

Census-designated place in Kootenai County, Idaho, United States

- Census-designated place
- Location in Kootenai County, Idaho

- Location within Idaho Location within the United States
- Coordinates: 47°23′59″N 116°46′13″W
- Country: United States
- State: Idaho
- County: Kootenai

Area
  - Total: 1.045 sq mi (2.71 km^{2})
  - Land: 1.045 sq mi (2.71 km^{2})
  - Water: 0 sq mi (0 km^{2})
- Elevation: 2,658 ft (810 m)

Population (2010)
  - Total: 43
  - Density: 41/sq mi (16/km^{2})
- Time zone: UTC-8 (Pacific (PST))
  - Summer (DST): UTC-7 (PDT)
- Area codes: 208, 986
- GNIS feature ID: 2585569

Conkling Park is a census-designated place in Kootenai County, Idaho, United States. As of the 2020 census, Conkling Park had a population of 73.

== Demographics ==
Historical population
Census	Pop.	Note	%±
2020	73		—
U.S. Decennial Census

== See also ==
- List of census-designated places in Idaho
