= Basalt, Idaho =

City in Bingham County, Idaho, United States

- City
- Location of Basalt in Bingham County, Idaho.
- Coordinates: 43°18′52″N 112°09′54″W
- Country: United States
- State: Idaho
- County: Bingham

Area
  - Total: 0.29 sq mi (0.76 km^{2})
  - Land: 0.29 sq mi (0.76 km^{2})
  - Water: 0 sq mi (0.00 km^{2})
- Elevation: 4,590 ft (1,400 m)

Population (2020)
  - Total: 357
  - Density: 1,200/sq mi (470/km^{2})
- Time zone: UTC-7 (Mountain (MST))
  - Summer (DST): UTC-6 (MDT)
- ZIP code: 83218
- Area codes: 208, 986
- FIPS code: 16-05230
- GNIS feature ID: 2409794

Basalt is a city in Bingham County, Idaho, United States. The population was 357 at the 2020 census.

== History ==
The first settlement at Basalt was made in 1885. A post office called Basalt has been in operation since 1888. The community was named for deposits of basalt near the original town site.

== Geography ==
According to the United States Census Bureau, the city has a total area of 0.30 square miles (0.78 km^{2}), all of it land.

== Demographics ==
Historical population
Census	Pop.	Note	%±
1910	200		—
1920	345		72.5%
1930	259		−24.9%
1940	252		−2.7%
1950	227		−9.9%
1960	275		21.1%
1970	349		26.9%
1980	414		18.6%
1990	407		−1.7%
2000	419		2.9%
2010	394		−6.0%
2020	357		−9.4%
U.S. Decennial Census

=== 2010 census ===
As of the census of 2010, there were 394 people, 132 households, and 108 families residing in the city. The population density was 1,313.3 inhabitants per square mile (507.1/km^{2}). There were 142 housing units at an average density of 473.3 per square mile (182.7/km^{2}). The racial makeup of the city was 90.6% White, 0.8% Native American, 6.9% from other races, and 1.8% from two or more races. Hispanic or Latino of any race were 13.2% of the population.

There were 132 households, of which 39.4% had children under the age of 18 living with them, 61.4% were married couples living together, 17.4% had a female householder with no husband present, 3.0% had a male householder with no wife present, and 18.2% were non-families. 15.9% of all households were made up of individuals, and 9.8% had someone living alone who was 65 years of age or older. The average household size was 2.98 and the average family size was 3.31.

The median age in the city was 33 years. 29.4% of residents were under the age of 18; 7.9% were between the ages of 18 and 24; 23.4% were from 25 to 44; 20.9% were from 45 to 64; and 18.5% were 65 years of age or older. The gender makeup of the city was 46.2% male and 53.8% female.

=== 2000 census ===
As of the census of 2000, there were 419 people, 121 households, and 106 families residing in the city. The population density was 1,457.8 inhabitants per square mile (562.9/km^{2}). There were 133 housing units at an average density of 462.7 per square mile (178.6/km^{2}). The racial makeup of the city was 84.96% White, 4.77% Native American, 8.35% from other races, and 1.91% from two or more races. Hispanic or Latino of any race were 14.80% of the population.

There were 121 households, out of which 47.9% had children under the age of 18 living with them, 72.7% were married couples living together, 8.3% had a female householder with no husband present, and 11.6% were non-families. 11.6% of all households were made up of individuals, and 7.4% had someone living alone who was 65 years of age or older. The average household size was 3.46 and the average family size was 3.68.

In the city, the population was spread out, with 37.5% under the age of 18, 8.6% from 18 to 24, 23.9% from 25 to 44, 19.3% from 45 to 64, and 10.7% who were 65 years of age or older. The median age was 28 years. For every 100 females, there were 101.4 males. For every 100 females age 18 and over, there were 107.9 males.

The median income for a household in the city was $36,719, and the median income for a family was $38,542. Males had a median income of $28,750 versus $21,250 for females. The per capita income for the city was $13,185. About 7.1% of families and 10.9% of the population were below the poverty line, including 16.1% of those under age 18 and 7.1% of those age 65 or over.

== See also ==
- List of cities in Idaho
