= Moreland, Idaho =

Census-designated place in Bingham County, Idaho, United States

- Census-designated place
- Location of Moreland in Bingham County, Idaho.

- Location within Idaho
- Coordinates: 43°13′10″N 112°26′16″W
- Country: United States
- State: Idaho
- County: Bingham

Area
  - Total: 2.437 sq mi (6.31 km^{2})
  - Land: 2.437 sq mi (6.31 km^{2})
  - Water: 0 sq mi (0 km^{2})
- Elevation: 4,465 ft (1,361 m)

Population (2020)
  - Total: 1,264
  - Density: 518.7/sq mi (200.3/km^{2})
- Time zone: UTC-7 (Mountain (MST))
  - Summer (DST): UTC-6 (MDT)
- Area codes: 208, 986
- GNIS feature ID: 2585577

Moreland is a census-designated place in Bingham County, Idaho, United States. Its population was 1,264 as of the 2020 census.

== Demographics ==
Historical population
Census	Pop.	Note	%±
2010	1,278		—
2020	1,264		−1.1%
U.S. Decennial Census

=== 2020 census ===
As of the 2020 census, Moreland had a population of 1,264. The median age was 34.9 years. 30.8% of residents were under the age of 18 and 17.2% of residents were 65 years of age or older. For every 100 females there were 103.9 males, and for every 100 females age 18 and over there were 111.4 males age 18 and over.

32.4% of residents lived in urban areas, while 67.6% lived in rural areas.

There were 387 households in Moreland, of which 39.5% had children under the age of 18 living in them. Of all households, 69.5% were married-couple households, 15.2% were households with a male householder and no spouse or partner present, and 11.6% were households with a female householder and no spouse or partner present. About 17.6% of all households were made up of individuals and 10.9% had someone living alone who was 65 years of age or older.

There were 414 housing units, of which 6.5% were vacant. The homeowner vacancy rate was 2.0% and the rental vacancy rate was 0.0%.

Racial composition as of the 2020 census
Race	Number	Percent
White	958	75.8%
Black or African American	4	0.3%
American Indian and Alaska Native	21	1.7%
Asian	6	0.5%
Native Hawaiian and Other Pacific Islander	0	0.0%
Some other race	153	12.1%
Two or more races	122	9.7%
Hispanic or Latino (of any race)	290	22.9%

== See also ==
- List of census-designated places in Idaho
