= KLCE =

- Blackfoot, Idaho; United States
- Broadcast area: Idaho Falls-Pocatello, Idaho
- Frequency: 97.3 MHz (HD Radio)
- Branding: Classy 97

Programming
- Format: Adult contemporary
- Subchannels: HD2: Soft adult contemporary "Classy 97 Lite"; HD3: Christian adult contemporary "Sunny 97"

Ownership
- Owner: Riverbend Media Group; (Riverbend Communications, LLC)
- Sister stations: KCVI; KTHK; KFTZ; KNBL

History
- First air date: 1975
- Former call signs: KBLI-FM (1975–1984)
- Call sign meaning: Similar to "classy"

Technical information
- Licensing authority: FCC
- Facility ID: 71772
- Class: C
- ERP: 100,000 watts
- HAAT: 461 meters (1,512 ft)
- Transmitter coordinates: 43°30′3″N 112°39′43″W
- Translators: 97.7 K249CM (Pocatello/Rexburg); 97.7 K249EE (Idaho Falls)

Links
- Public license information: Public file; LMS
- Webcast: Listen live; HD2: Listen live; HD3: Listen live
- Website: www.klce.com

KLCE (97.3 FM) is a radio station broadcasting an adult contemporary format. Licensed to Blackfoot, Idaho, the station serves the East Idaho area. The station is owned by Riverbend Media Group through Riverbend Communications, LLC.

== History ==
The station was assigned the call sign KBLI-FM on March 3, 1975. On May 10, 1984, the station changed its call sign to KLCE. KLCE is a successful market leader with their adult contemporary format. The station continues to serve the adult female demographic in East Idaho.
