= United States Post Office–Blackfoot Main =

- US Post Office--Blackfoot Main
- U.S. National Register of Historic Places
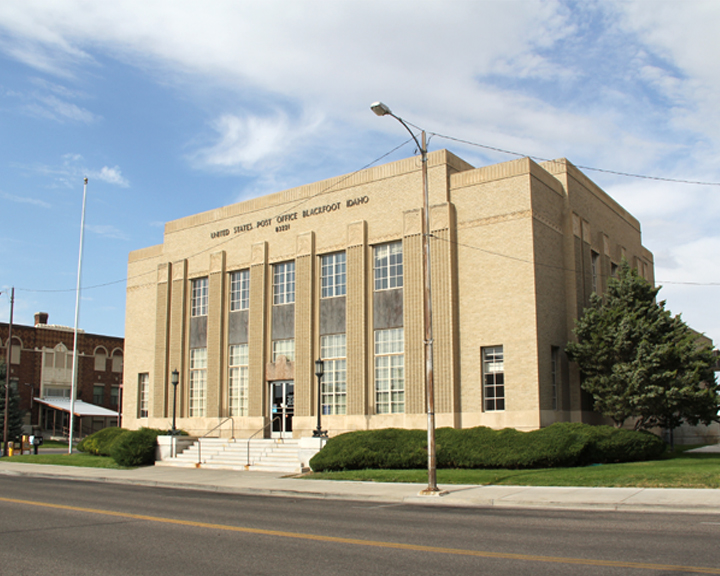

- Location within Idaho Location within the United States
- Interactive map showing the location for U.S. Post Office-Blackfoot Main
- Location: 165 W. Pacific, Blackfoot, Idaho
- Coordinates: 43°11′27″N 112°20′42″W
- Area: 0.7 acres (0.28 ha)
- Built: 1936
- Architect: Gilbert Stanley Underwood
- Architectural style: Moderne
- MPS: US Post Offices in Idaho 1900--1941 MPS
- NRHP reference No.: 89000128
- Added to NRHP: March 16, 1989

The U.S. Post Office–Blackfoot Main, also known as Blackfoot Main Post Office, in Blackfoot, Idaho was built in 1936. It was listed on the National Register of Historic Places in 1989. It has Moderne architecture.

It was designed by Gilbert Stanley Underwood.

The interior includes a five-panel mural titled The Arrival Celebration. It was painted in 1939 by Anthony Standing Soldier, a young Sioux Indian artist from Pine Ridge, South Dakota, for $2,000.

== See also ==
- List of United States post offices
