= KFTZ =

Radio station in Idaho Falls, Idaho

- Idaho Falls, Idaho; United States
- Broadcast area: Idaho Falls, Idaho; Pocatello, Idaho; Rexburg, Idaho; Blackfoot, Idaho
- Frequency: 103.3 MHz (HD Radio)
- Branding: Z103

Programming
- Format: Top 40 (CHR)
- Subchannels: HD2: 1990s/2000s hits "Throwback 103"; HD3: Dance music "Vibez 103"

Ownership
- Owner: Riverbend Media Group; (Riverbend Communications, LLC)
- Sister stations: KCVI; KLCE; KNBL; KTHK

History
- First air date: 1986

Technical information
- Licensing authority: FCC
- Facility ID: 18116
- Class: C1
- ERP: 100,000 watts
- HAAT: 201 meters (659 ft)
- Repeater: 103.3 KFTZ-FM1 (Pocatello)

Links
- Public license information: Public file; LMS
- Webcast: Listen live; HD2: Listen live; HD3: Listen live
- Website: www.z103.fm

KFTZ (103.3 FM, "Z103") is a top 40 (CHR) radio station located in Idaho Falls, Idaho. It is licensed, owned and operated by Riverbend Communications. KFTZ has been Southeast Idaho's hot music station since the 1980s. In November 2023, KFTZ and its sister stations launched HD2 channels. KFTZ launched Throwbacks 103 highlighting songs from its history and HD3 is a dance channel playing music from their weekend mixshow.

== Booster ==
Call sign	Frequency	City of license	FID	ERP (W)	Class	Transmitter coordinates	FCC info
KFTZ-FM1	103.3 FM	Pocatello, Idaho	18118	200	D	42°50′54.6″N 112°26′48.9″W	LMS
