= KCVI =

Radio station in Blackfoot, Idaho

Coordinates: 43.501°N 112.663°W

- Blackfoot, Idaho; United States
- Broadcast area: Idaho Falls-Pocatello, Idaho
- Frequency: 101.5 MHz (HD Radio)
- Branding: K-Bear 101

Programming
- Format: Active rock
- Subchannels: HD2: Classic alternative "Alt 101"; HD3: Variety hits "Cannonball 101"
- Affiliations: United Stations Radio Networks

Ownership
- Owner: Riverbend Media Group; (Riverbend Communications, LLC)
- Sister stations: KLCE; KTHK; KFTZ; KNBL

History
- First air date: 1999

Technical information
- Licensing authority: FCC
- Facility ID: 71785
- Class: C
- ERP: 95,000 watts
- HAAT: 461 meters (1,512 ft)
- Translators: 101.9 K270CF (Lava Hot Springs); HD3: 101.1 K266AF (Pocatello); HD3: 101.1 K266BY (Pocatello)

Links
- Public license information: Public file; LMS
- Webcast: Listen live; HD2: Listen live; HD3: Listen live
- Website: www.kbear.fm

KCVI (101.5 FM, "K-Bear 101") is a commercial radio station in Idaho Falls, Idaho, broadcasting to the East Idaho area. KCVI airs an active rock music format. The station is owned and operated by Riverbend Communications.

== Current on-air staff ==
- Viktor Wilt - Morning Host / Program Director - 6am - 10am
- Peaches (Brenden Peach) - Afternoon Host - 2pm - 7pm
- Lou Brutus - Syndicated Host - HardDrive XL and HardDrive
- Jade Davis - Operations Manager / Fart King
- Jeff "FJ" Adams - Weekends - 10am - 3pm

== Former on-air staff ==
- Howie Rock
- Piper Phynnie
- Ian
- Brad Royal
- Phyllis
- Drew
- Kelly "Machete" Martinez
- Mohawk Mikey
