= Mount Putnam (Idaho) =

Mountain in Idaho, United States

Coordinates: 42°57′11″N 112°09′54″W

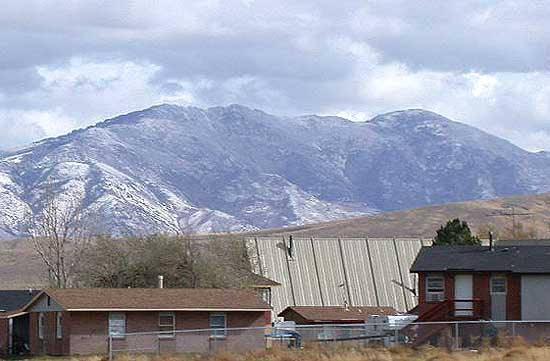
Mount Putnam

Mount Putnam or North Putnam Peak is a summit in the U.S. state of Idaho, with an elevation of 8,809 feet (2,685 m), named for Captain James E. Putnam, 12th U.S. Infantry, who commanded the detachment which established the Fort Hall Military Post at Lincoln Creek in 1870.
