= KTHK =

- Idaho Falls, Idaho; United States
- Broadcast area: Idaho Falls, Idaho
- Frequency: 105.5 MHz (HD Radio)
- Branding: 105 The Goat

Programming
- Format: Sports talk
- Subchannels: HD2: Red dirt country "Outlaw 105"; HD3: Classic country "105 Legends"
- Affiliations: Westwood One Sports Network Denver Broncos Utah Jazz Utah Mammoth

Ownership
- Owner: Riverbend Media Group; (Riverbend Communications, LLC)
- Sister stations: KLCE; KCVI; KFTZ; KNBL

History
- First air date: 1993
- Former call signs: KPVT (1992–1993); KOSZ (1993–2001); KPLV (2001–2004)
- Call sign meaning: "The Hawk" (former branding)

Technical information
- Licensing authority: FCC
- Facility ID: 33447
- Class: C1
- ERP: 100,000 watts
- HAAT: 201 meters (659 ft)
- Transmitter coordinates: 43.352°N 112.007°W
- Translator: 105.9 K290CE (Pocatello)

Links
- Public license information: Public file; LMS
- Webcast: Listen live; HD2: Listen live; HD3: Listen live

KTHK (105.5 FM) is a commercial radio station located in Idaho Falls, Idaho. KTHK airs a sports talk format branded as "105 The Goat", formerly 105 The Hawk.The station is owned and operated by Riverbend Communications.
