= Fort Hall, Idaho =

- Census-designated place
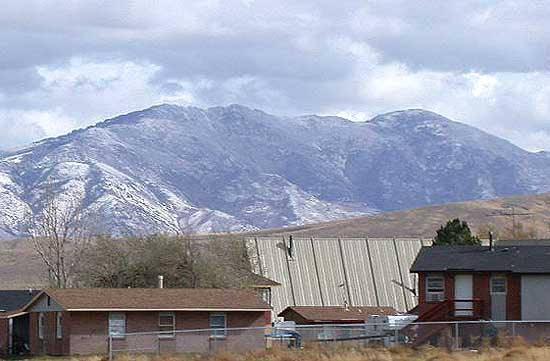
- Houses in Fort Hall, Idaho

- Location of Fort Hall, Idaho
- Coordinates: 42°59′18″N 112°28′54″W
- Country: United States
- State: Idaho
- Counties: Bannock, Bingham

Area
  - Total: 35.2 sq mi (91 km^{2})
  - Land: 35.2 sq mi (91 km^{2})
  - Water: 0.0 sq mi (0 km^{2})
- Elevation: 4,446 ft (1,355 m)

Population (2020)
  - Total: 3,195
  - Density: 90.8/sq mi (35.0/km^{2})
- Time zone: UTC-7 (Mountain (MST))
  - Summer (DST): UTC-6 (MDT)
- ZIP code: 83203
- Area codes: 208, 986
- FIPS code: 16-28360
- GNIS feature ID: 2408239

Fort Hall is a census-designated place (CDP) in the southeastern part of the U.S. state of Idaho which is split between Bannock County in the south and Bingham County in the north. It is located on the Fort Hall Indian Reservation along the Snake River north of Pocatello and near the site of the original Fort Hall in the Oregon Country. The population was 3,195 at the 2020 census.

The Bannock County portion of Fort Hall is part of the Pocatello, Idaho Metropolitan Statistical Area, while the Bingham County portion is part of the Blackfoot, Idaho Micropolitan Statistical Area.

== Geography ==
According to the United States Census Bureau, the CDP has a total area of 35.2 square miles (91 km^{2}), all of it land.

=== Climate ===
According to the Köppen Climate Classification system, Fort Hall has a semi-arid climate, abbreviated "BSk" on climate maps.

== Demographics ==
Historical population
| Census | Pop. | Note | %± |
|---|---|---|---|
| 2010 | 3,201 | | — |
| 2020 | 3,195 | | −0.2% |
U.S. Decennial Census

=== 2020 census ===
As of the 2020 census, Fort Hall had a population of 3,195. The median age was 35.4 years. 28.5% of residents were under the age of 18 and 15.4% of residents were 65 years of age or older. For every 100 females there were 94.7 males, and for every 100 females age 18 and over there were 94.2 males age 18 and over.

0.0% of residents lived in urban areas, while 100.0% lived in rural areas.

There were 1,026 households in Fort Hall, of which 38.4% had children under the age of 18 living in them. Of all households, 34.5% were married-couple households, 23.2% were households with a male householder and no spouse or partner present, and 34.1% were households with a female householder and no spouse or partner present. About 25.2% of all households were made up of individuals and 9.9% had someone living alone who was 65 years of age or older.

There were 1,128 housing units, of which 9.0% were vacant. The homeowner vacancy rate was 1.6% and the rental vacancy rate was 6.2%.

Racial composition as of the 2020 census
| Race | Number | Percent |
|---|---|---|
| White | 767 | 24.0% |
| Black or African American | 0 | 0.0% |
| American Indian and Alaska Native | 2,208 | 69.1% |
| Asian | 9 | 0.3% |
| Native Hawaiian and Other Pacific Islander | 2 | 0.1% |
| Some other race | 74 | 2.3% |
| Two or more races | 135 | 4.2% |
| Hispanic or Latino (of any race) | 316 | 9.9% |

=== 2000 census ===
As of the census of 2000, there were 3,193 people, 969 households, and 781 families residing in the CDP. The population density was 90.8 inhabitants per square mile (35.1/km^{2}). There were 1,088 housing units at an average density of 30.9 per square mile (11.9/km^{2}). The racial makeup of the CDP was 30.22% White, 0.03% African American, 65.39% Native American, 0.31% Asian, 0.03% Pacific Islander, 2.25% from other races, and 1.75% from two or more races. Hispanic or Latino of any race were 7.61% of the population.

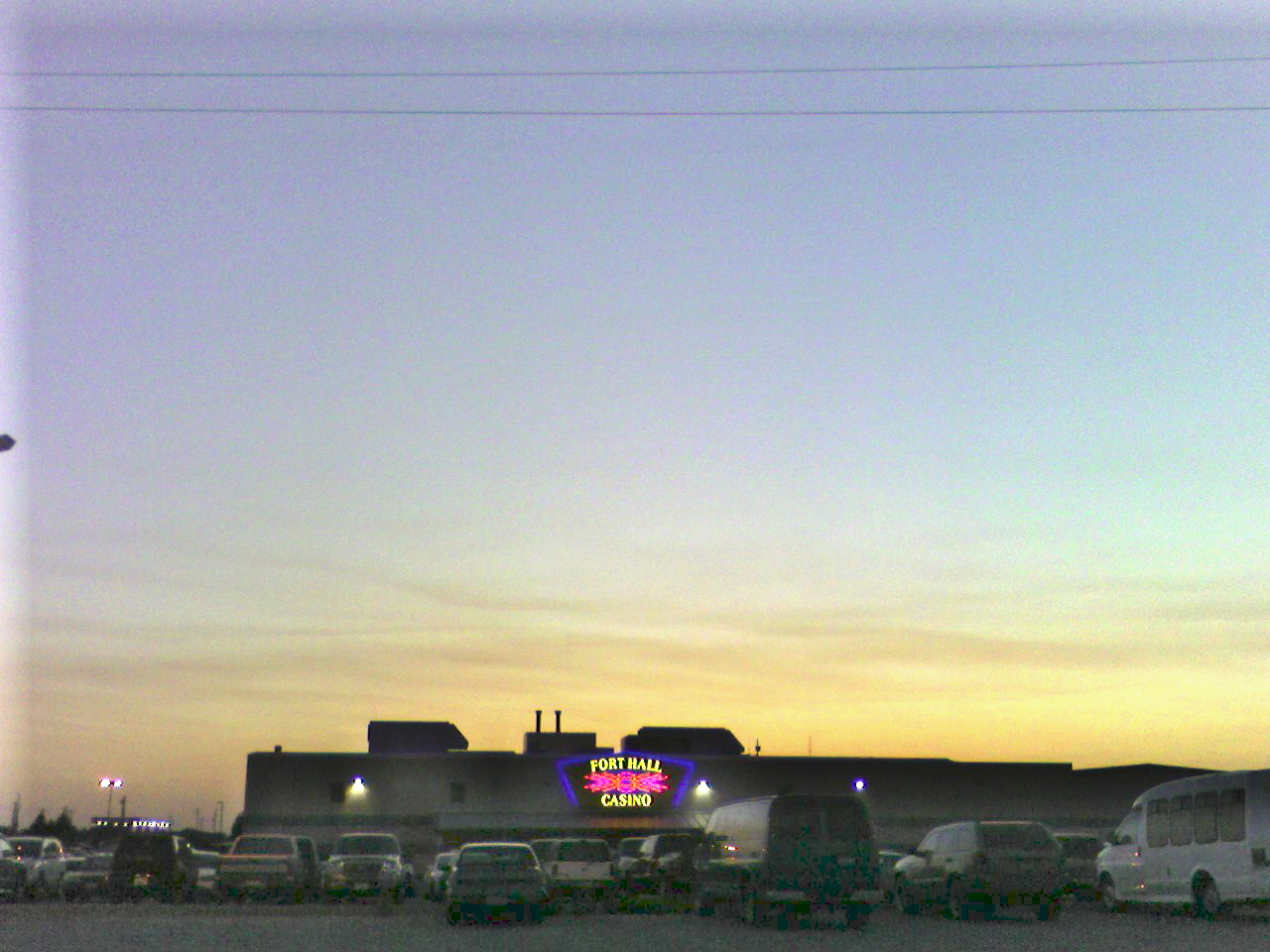
The Fort Hall Casino, August 2007

There were 969 households, out of which 42.2% had children under the age of 18 living with them, 49.6% were married couples living together, 22.5% had a female householder with no husband present, and 19.3% were non-families. 16.3% of all households were made up of individuals, and 4.4% had someone living alone who was 65 years of age or older. The average household size was 3.26 and the average family size was 3.63.

In the CDP, the population was spread out, with 34.7% under the age of 18, 11.3% from 18 to 24, 28.2% from 25 to 44, 18.5% from 45 to 64, and 7.3% who were 65 years of age or older. The median age was 28 years. For every 100 females, there were 94.7 males. For every 100 females age 18 and over, there were 92.3 males.

The median income for a household in the CDP was $30,313, and the median income for a family was $32,256. Males had a median income of $27,310 versus $21,544 for females. The per capita income for the CDP was $10,563. About 22.6% of families and 27.2% of the population were below the poverty line, including 32.5% of those under age 18 and 26.9% of those age 65 or over.
