= Bingham County, Idaho =

County in Idaho, United States

- County
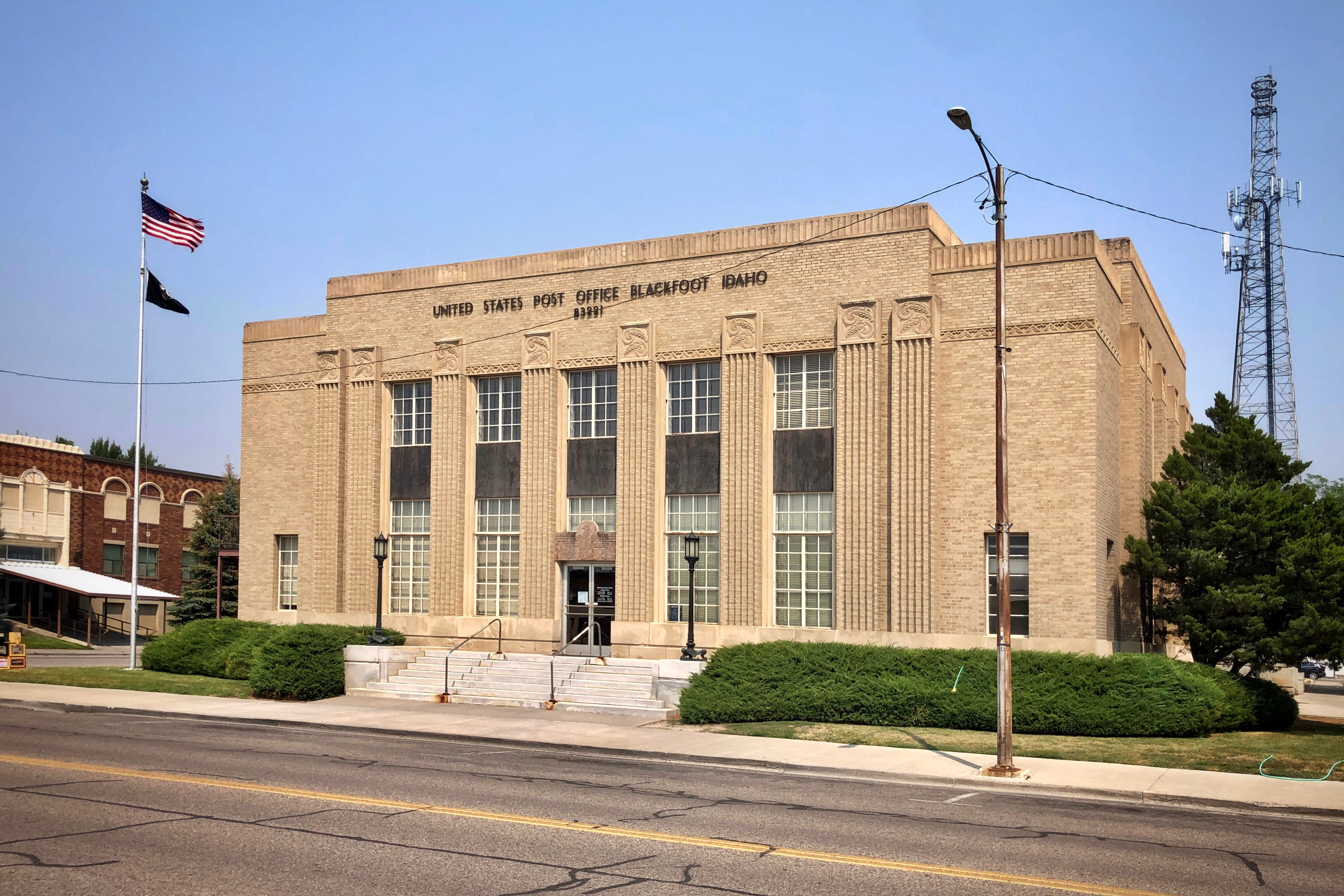
- United States Post Office in Blackfoot, Idaho

- Location within the U.S. state of Idaho
- Coordinates: 43°13′N 112°24′W
- Country: United States
- State: Idaho
- Founded: January 13, 1885
- Named for: Henry H. Bingham
- Seat: Blackfoot
- Largest city: Blackfoot

Area
  - Total: 2,120 sq mi (5,500 km^{2})
  - Land: 2,094 sq mi (5,420 km^{2})
  - Water: 26 sq mi (67 km^{2}) 1.2%

Population (2020)
  - Total: 47,992
  - Estimate (2025): 51,153 ▲
  - Density: 23/sq mi (8.9/km^{2})
- Time zone: UTC−7 (Mountain)
  - Summer (DST): UTC−6 (MDT)
- Congressional district: 2nd
- Website: www.binghamid.gov

Bingham County is a county in the U.S. state of Idaho. As of the 2020 census, the population was 47,992. The county seat and largest city is Blackfoot.

Bingham County comprises the Blackfoot, ID Micropolitan Statistical Area, which is included in the Idaho Falls-Rexburg-Blackfoot, ID Combined Statistical Area.

== History ==
Bingham County was created January 13, 1885. It was named for Henry H. Bingham, a congressman from Pennsylvania and friend of William Bunn, Idaho's Territorial Governor. The county was formed from Oneida County and was later partitioned itself to form Bannock (1893), Fremont (1893), Bonneville (1911), Power (1913), and Butte (1917) counties.

== Geography ==
According to the United States Census Bureau, the county has a total area of 2,120 square miles (5,500 km^{2}), of which 2,094 square miles (5,420 km^{2}) is land and 26 square miles (67 km^{2}) (1.2%) is water. The Snake River flows southwest through the middle of Bingham County; at the county's southwest corner the river flows into the American Falls Reservoir. At the SE county corner is the Blackfoot Reservoir and Dam, impounding waters of the Blackfoot River. Outflow from the Blackfoot Dam flows northwesterly through the lower part of Bingham County, discharging into the Snake River.

Smaller buttes called the East Butte and the Middle Butte located in the Snake River Plain are visible south of US Route 20.

=== Adjacent counties ===
- Jefferson County - north
- Bonneville County - east
- Caribou County - southeast
- Bannock County - south
- Power County - southwest
- Blaine County - west
- Butte County - northwest

=== Highways ===
- - Interstate 15
- - US 20
- - US 26
- - US 91
- - SH-39

== Demographics ==
Historical population
Census	Pop.	Note	%±
1890	13,575		—
1900	10,447		−23.0%
1910	23,306		123.1%
1920	18,310		−21.4%
1930	18,561		1.4%
1940	21,044		13.4%
1950	23,271		10.6%
1960	28,218		21.3%
1970	29,167		3.4%
1980	36,489		25.1%
1990	37,583		3.0%
2000	41,735		11.0%
2010	45,607		9.3%
2020	47,992		5.2%
2025 (est.)	51,153	▲	6.6%
U.S. Decennial Census; 1790–1960, 1900–1990, 1990–2000, 2010–2020

=== Racial and ethnic composition ===
Bingham County, Idaho – Racial and ethnic composition Note: the US Census treats Hispanic/Latino as an ethnic category. This table excludes Latinos from the racial categories and assigns them to a separate category. Hispanics/Latinos may be of any race.
Race / Ethnicity (NH = Non-Hispanic)	Pop 1980	Pop 1990	Pop 2000	Pop 2010	Pop 2020	% 1980	% 1990	% 2000	% 2010	% 2020
White alone (NH)	31,939	31,432	32,824	34,176	34,937	87.53%	83.63%	78.65%	74.94%	72.80%
Black or African American alone (NH)	6	31	52	78	115	0.02%	0.08%	0.12%	0.17%	0.24%
Native American or Alaska Native alone (NH)	2,153	2,209	2,564	2,560	2,892	5.90%	5.88%	6.14%	5.61%	6.03%
Asian alone (NH)	127	264	235	268	192	0.35%	0.70%	0.56%	0.59%	0.40%
Native Hawaiian or Pacific Islander alone (NH)	x	x	12	32	38	x	x	0.03%	0.07%	0.08%
Other race alone (NH)	0	33	21	81	138	0.00%	0.09%	0.05%	0.18%	0.29%
Mixed race or Multiracial (NH)	x	x	477	548	1,349	x	x	1.14%	1.20%	2.81%
Hispanic or Latino (any race)	2,264	3,614	5,550	7,864	8,331	6.20%	9.62%	13.30%	17.24%	17.36%
Total	36,489	37,583	41,735	45,607	47,992	100.00%	100.00%	100.00%	100.00%	100.00%

=== 2020 census ===
As of the 2020 census, the county had a population of 47,992. The median age was 34.8 years. 30.6% of residents were under the age of 18 and 14.9% of residents were 65 years of age or older. For every 100 females there were 99.8 males, and for every 100 females age 18 and over there were 97.8 males age 18 and over.

The racial makeup of the county was 76.3% White, 0.3% Black or African American, 7.0% American Indian and Alaska Native, 0.4% Asian, 0.1% Native Hawaiian and Pacific Islander, 8.7% from some other race, and 7.3% from two or more races. Hispanic or Latino residents of any race comprised 17.4% of the population.

40.3% of residents lived in urban areas, while 59.7% lived in rural areas.

There were 15,891 households in the county, of which 39.6% had children under the age of 18 living with them and 20.6% had a female householder with no spouse or partner present. About 20.6% of all households were made up of individuals and 9.7% had someone living alone who was 65 years of age or older.

There were 16,905 housing units, of which 6.0% were vacant. Among occupied housing units, 76.4% were owner-occupied and 23.6% were renter-occupied. The homeowner vacancy rate was 0.9% and the rental vacancy rate was 4.4%.

=== 2010 census ===
As of the 2010 census, there were 45,607 people, 14,999 households, and 11,731 families in the county. The population density was 21.8 inhabitants per square mile (8.4/km^{2}). There were 16,141 housing units at an average density of 7.7 units per square mile (3.0 units/km^{2}). The racial makeup of the county was 80.6% white, 6.5% American Indian, 0.6% Asian, 0.2% black or African American, 0.1% Pacific islander, 9.8% from other races, and 2.1% from two or more races. Those of Hispanic or Latino origin made up 17.2% of the population. In terms of ancestry, 22.3% were English, 12.7% were German, 5.9% were American, and 5.0% were Irish.

Of the 14,999 households, 43.6% had children under the age of 18 living with them, 62.4% were married couples living together, 10.5% had a female householder with no husband present, 21.8% were non-families, and 18.5% of all households were made up of individuals. The average household size was 3.02 and the average family size was 3.45. The median age was 31.8 years.

The median income for a household in the county was $44,128 and the median income for a family was $51,750. Males had a median income of $39,703 versus $25,815 for females. The per capita income for the county was $18,633. About 13.2% of families and 14.7% of the population were below the poverty line, including 18.4% of those under age 18 and 10.5% of those age 65 or over.

=== 2000 census ===
As of the 2000 census, there were 41,735 people, 13,317 households, and 10,706 families in the county. The population density was 20 people per square mile (7.7 people/km^{2}). There were 14,303 housing units at an average density of 7 units per square mile (2.7 units/km^{2}). The racial makeup of the county was 82.43% White, 0.17% Black or African American, 6.70% Native American, 0.57% Asian, 0.03% Pacific Islander, 7.95% from other races, and 2.14% from two or more races. 13.30% of the population were Hispanic or Latino of any race. 23.6% were of English, 12.5% American, 8.9% German and 5.1% Danish ancestry.

There were 13,317 households, out of which 44.60% had children under the age of 18 living with them, 66.70% were married couples living together, 9.80% had a female householder with no husband present, and 19.60% were non-families. 17.10% of all households were made up of individuals, and 7.70% had someone living alone who was 65 years of age or older. The average household size was 3.10 and the average family size was 3.52.

The county population contained 34.90% under the age of 18, 9.70% from 18 to 24, 25.30% from 25 to 44, 19.70% from 45 to 64, and 10.30% who were 65 years of age or older. The median age was 30 years. For every 100 females there were 100.00 males. For every 100 females age 18 and over, there were 97.90 males.

The median income for a household in the county was $36,423, and the median income for a family was $40,312. Males had a median income of $31,950 versus $21,591 for females. The per capita income for the county was $14,365. About 9.90% of families and 12.40% of the population were below the poverty line, including 16.30% of those under age 18 and 7.20% of those age 65 or over.

== Communities ==
=== Cities ===
- Aberdeen
- Basalt
- Blackfoot
- Firth
- Shelley

=== Census-designated places ===
- Fort Hall
- Groveland
- Moreland
- Riverside
- Rockford

=== Unincorporated communities ===
- Alridge
- Atomic City (former city)
- Cerro Grande
- Clarkson
- Coffee Point
- Collins
- Jameston
- Gibson
- Goshen
- McDonaldville
- Morgan
- Pingree
- Rising River
- Rose
- Springfield
- Sterling
- Thomas
- Wapello
- Wolverine
- Woodville

== Politics ==
Bingham County voters are reliably Republican. In no national election since 1948 has the county selected the Democratic Party candidate.

United States presidential election results for Bingham County, Idaho
Year	Republican		Democratic		Third party(ies)	
Year	No.	%	No.	%	No.	%
1892	937	48.35%	0	0.00%	1,001	51.65%
1896	194	13.47%	1,232	85.56%	14	0.97%
1900	1,436	47.10%	1,613	52.90%	0	0.00%
1904	3,186	71.15%	890	19.87%	402	8.98%
1908	3,277	59.93%	1,749	31.99%	442	8.08%
1912	1,410	47.91%	814	27.66%	719	24.43%
1916	1,885	43.34%	2,306	53.02%	158	3.63%
1920	3,293	73.55%	1,184	26.45%	0	0.00%
1924	2,693	53.45%	696	13.82%	1,649	32.73%
1928	3,236	64.27%	1,778	35.31%	21	0.42%
1932	2,894	42.52%	3,802	55.85%	111	1.63%
1936	2,354	34.86%	4,215	62.42%	184	2.72%
1940	3,662	48.90%	3,815	50.95%	11	0.15%
1944	3,223	48.41%	3,428	51.49%	7	0.11%
1948	3,162	49.04%	3,197	49.58%	89	1.38%
1952	6,114	66.87%	3,024	33.07%	5	0.05%
1956	5,853	63.17%	3,412	36.83%	0	0.00%
1960	5,934	55.06%	4,843	44.94%	0	0.00%
1964	5,364	50.63%	5,231	49.37%	0	0.00%
1968	6,484	60.23%	2,988	27.76%	1,293	12.01%
1972	6,886	64.33%	2,476	23.13%	1,343	12.55%
1976	7,327	60.83%	4,347	36.09%	371	3.08%
1980	11,781	76.07%	2,933	18.94%	773	4.99%
1984	11,900	78.72%	3,064	20.27%	152	1.01%
1988	10,131	68.89%	4,346	29.55%	228	1.55%
1992	7,333	45.86%	3,565	22.29%	5,093	31.85%
1996	8,391	56.39%	4,304	28.92%	2,186	14.69%
2000	10,628	73.47%	3,310	22.88%	527	3.64%
2004	12,734	76.87%	3,605	21.76%	226	1.36%
2008	12,230	71.29%	4,424	25.79%	502	2.93%
2012	13,440	76.03%	3,822	21.62%	416	2.35%
2016	10,907	65.61%	2,924	17.59%	2,794	16.81%
2020	15,295	76.49%	4,124	20.62%	577	2.89%
2024	16,188	78.39%	3,878	18.78%	585	2.83%

== Education ==
School districts include:

- Aberdeen School District 58
- Blackfoot School District 55
- Bonneville Joint School District 93
- Firth School District 59
- Shelley Joint School District 60
- Snake River School District 52

A portion of Bingham County is in the catchment zone (but not the taxation zone) of College of Eastern Idaho.

== See also ==
- National Register of Historic Places listings in Bingham County, Idaho
