= Blackfoot, Idaho =

Blackfoot
- City
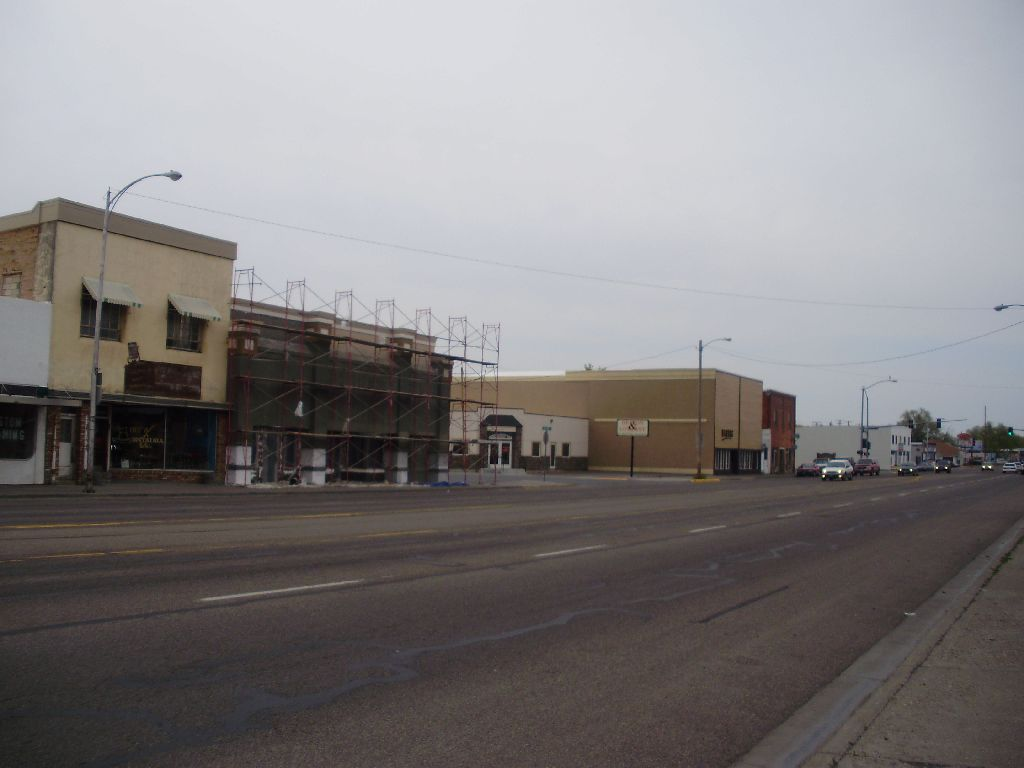
- Business District of Blackfoot

- Seal

- Location of Blackfoot in Bingham County, Idaho
- Coordinates: 43°11′27″N 112°21′38″W
- Country: United States
- State: Idaho
- County: Bingham
- Founded: 1878
- Incorporated: January 16, 1901

Government
  - Mayor: Scott Stufflebeam

Area
  - City: 6.21 sq mi (16.08 km^{2})
  - Land: 5.92 sq mi (15.34 km^{2})
  - Water: 0.29 sq mi (0.74 km^{2})
- Elevation: 4,502 ft (1,372 m)

Population (2020)
  - City: 12,346
  - Estimate (2022): 12,702
  - Density: 2,084/sq mi (804.7/km^{2})
  - Urban: 14,231
  - Metro: 49,923 (US: 217th)
  - Combined: 284,485 (US: 121st)
- Time zone: UTC–7 (Mountain (MST))
  - Summer (DST): UTC–6 (MDT)
- ZIP Code: 83221
- Area codes: 208 and 986
- FIPS code: 16-07840
- GNIS feature ID: 2409857
- Website: cityofblackfoot.org

Blackfoot is a city in and the county seat of Bingham County, Idaho, United States. The population was 12,346 at the 2020 census. Blackfoot is the principal city of the Blackfoot, Idaho, Micropolitan Statistical Area, which includes Bingham County.

== History ==
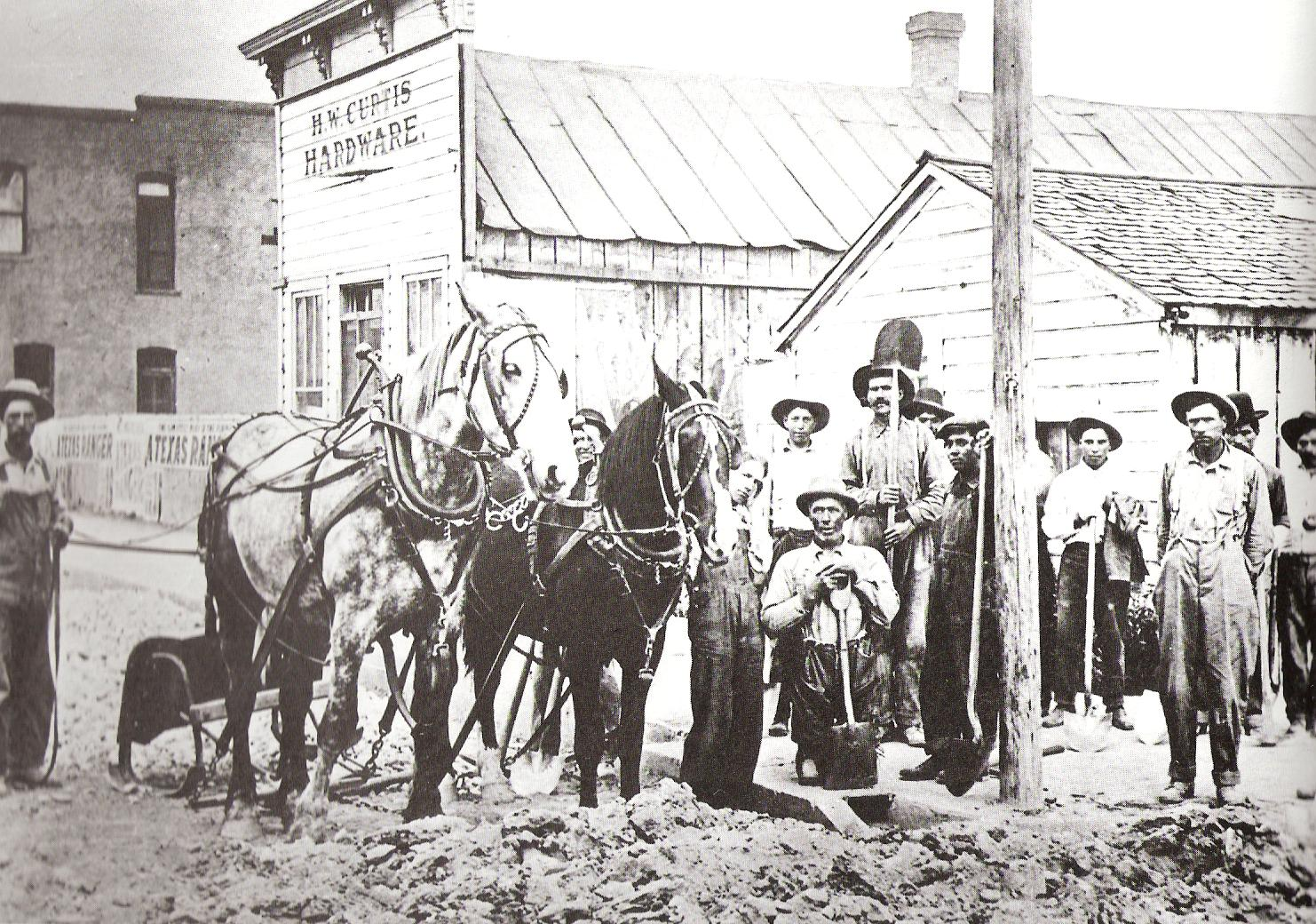
Early settlers plow the road for Main Street

The city of Blackfoot is located near the center of Bingham County, on the south side of the Snake River. It was designated the county seat by the Thirteenth Territorial Legislature on January 13, 1885. Originally, the county seat was to be Eagle Rock (the original name for Idaho Falls). However, supposedly, on the night before the legislation was to be signed, men from Blackfoot bribed a clerk to erase Eagle Rock and write in Blackfoot. The measure went through without opposition and was signed by the governor. The origin of this accusation, written many years after the event, was a Blackfoot newspaper editor named Byrd Trego. The battle for county seat between Eagle Rock and Blackfoot was a political tug-of-war involving sectional and anti-Mormon factions in the Idaho Legislature. The leader of the southeastern Idaho anti-Mormons was a Yale graduate named Fred Dubois, who settled in Blackfoot in 1880. The legislative maneuvering to overturn Eagle Rock as the county seat naturally left "disparaging rumors intimating some skullduggery on Blackfoot’s part."

Frederick S. Stevens and Joe Warren were the first permanent white settlers of record in Bingham County. In 1866, Stevens and Warren filed claims in the Snake River Valley near the present-day location of Blackfoot, where they started farming and ranching. The area was a flat, expansive plain of sagebrush frequented by Indians. To create a place of safety for the scattered settlers when they feared Indian trouble, Mr. Warren outfitted his cabin with holes between the logs where men could stand guard, day or night, until the natives left the neighborhood. When the Utah and Northern Railway signed contracts to expand north into Idaho in the 1870s, some of the settlers laid out a town on the Shilling and Lewis homesteads. The planned town, named Blackfoot, which was what the area had been called by fur traders, was near the Corbett stage station, about a mile from the Snake River, and two miles from the Blackfoot River.

Civil War veteran William Edward Wheeler, from Vermont, was an early settler. On July 1, 1880, Wheeler began publishing a newspaper called the Blackfoot Register. The first issue described the businesses in operation in Blackfoot on the publication date: "four general merchandise stores, one jewelry store, a livery stable, four saloons, a hotel, one meat market, two blacksmith shops, one barber shop and one lumber yard." Henry W. Curtis opened the first hardware store in 1885.

The first issue of the Blackfoot Register also described "a ditch being dug from the Blackfoot River that would irrigate several thousand acres." It was their plan to bring the water into town so residents could grow gardens and plant trees. The goal was finally realized in 1886 when Alfred Moyes planted the first shade trees in the Upper Snake River Plain around the Blackfoot Courthouse. Others in town followed suit and within a few years Blackfoot's tree-lined streets had a reputation that earned the nickname "Grove City." Sightseeing excursions from the surrounding area were reportedly organized so they could "feast their eyes on this verdure," which stood in pleasant, stark contrast with the endless acres of dry, gray sagebrush.

== Geography ==
According to the United States Census Bureau, the city has a total area of 6.07 square miles (15.72 km^{2}), of which 5.83 square miles (15.10 km^{2}) is land and 0.24 square miles (0.62 km^{2}) is water.

Blackfoot has a semi-arid climate (Köppen BSk) with cold winters and hot summers.

Climate data for Blackfoot, Idaho, 1991–2020 normals, extremes 1895–present
| Month | Jan | Feb | Mar | Apr | May | Jun | Jul | Aug | Sep | Oct | Nov | Dec | Year |
|---|---|---|---|---|---|---|---|---|---|---|---|---|---|
| Record high °F (°C) | 60 (16) | 74 (23) | 79 (26) | 88 (31) | 96 (36) | 108 (42) | 104 (40) | 104 (40) | 99 (37) | 88 (31) | 74 (23) | 61 (16) | 108 (42) |
| Mean maximum °F (°C) | 44.7 (7.1) | 50.4 (10.2) | 64.6 (18.1) | 75.7 (24.3) | 84.2 (29.0) | 91.1 (32.8) | 96.5 (35.8) | 95.4 (35.2) | 89.3 (31.8) | 78.1 (25.6) | 62.6 (17.0) | 49.3 (9.6) | 97.5 (36.4) |
| Mean daily maximum °F (°C) | 31.2 (−0.4) | 37.0 (2.8) | 48.8 (9.3) | 57.4 (14.1) | 67.6 (19.8) | 76.7 (24.8) | 86.9 (30.5) | 85.9 (29.9) | 75.1 (23.9) | 60.5 (15.8) | 44.8 (7.1) | 32.1 (0.1) | 58.7 (14.8) |
| Daily mean °F (°C) | 24.0 (−4.4) | 28.8 (−1.8) | 39.0 (3.9) | 46.1 (7.8) | 55.2 (12.9) | 63.2 (17.3) | 71.4 (21.9) | 70.1 (21.2) | 60.6 (15.9) | 47.8 (8.8) | 35.1 (1.7) | 24.8 (−4.0) | 47.2 (8.4) |
| Mean daily minimum °F (°C) | 16.8 (−8.4) | 20.5 (−6.4) | 29.1 (−1.6) | 34.7 (1.5) | 42.8 (6.0) | 49.8 (9.9) | 56.0 (13.3) | 54.2 (12.3) | 46.0 (7.8) | 35.0 (1.7) | 25.5 (−3.6) | 17.5 (−8.1) | 35.7 (2.0) |
| Mean minimum °F (°C) | −3.4 (−19.7) | 1.1 (−17.2) | 14.8 (−9.6) | 21.8 (−5.7) | 29.2 (−1.6) | 36.8 (2.7) | 45.5 (7.5) | 42.2 (5.7) | 32.3 (0.2) | 20.9 (−6.2) | 8.3 (−13.2) | −2.6 (−19.2) | −8.3 (−22.4) |
| Record low °F (°C) | −40 (−40) | −39 (−39) | −19 (−28) | 6 (−14) | 17 (−8) | 24 (−4) | 30 (−1) | 23 (−5) | 12 (−11) | −1 (−18) | −24 (−31) | −30 (−34) | −40 (−40) |
| Average precipitation inches (mm) | 0.99 (25) | 0.73 (19) | 1.10 (28) | 1.40 (36) | 1.75 (44) | 1.03 (26) | 0.50 (13) | 0.60 (15) | 0.97 (25) | 1.12 (28) | 0.75 (19) | 1.11 (28) | 12.05 (306) |
| Average snowfall inches (cm) | 6.0 (15) | 2.2 (5.6) | 0.3 (0.76) | 0.7 (1.8) | 0.0 (0.0) | 0.0 (0.0) | 0.0 (0.0) | 0.0 (0.0) | 0.0 (0.0) | 0.8 (2.0) | 1.4 (3.6) | 3.3 (8.4) | 14.7 (37.16) |
| Average precipitation days (≥ 0.01 in) | 7.7 | 6.9 | 6.8 | 8.5 | 8.1 | 5.8 | 3.3 | 3.3 | 4.3 | 5.9 | 5.1 | 7.8 | 73.5 |
| Average snowy days (≥ 0.1 in) | 2.6 | 2.2 | 0.5 | 0.3 | 0.0 | 0.0 | 0.0 | 0.0 | 0.0 | 0.3 | 1.1 | 3.7 | 10.7 |
Source 1: NOAA
Source 2: National Weather Service

== Demographics ==
Historical population
| Census | Pop. | Note | %± |
|---|---|---|---|
| 1880 | 285 | | — |
| 1890 | 538 | | 88.8% |
| 1900 | 1,000 | | 85.9% |
| 1910 | 2,202 | | 120.2% |
| 1920 | 3,937 | | 78.8% |
| 1930 | 3,199 | | −18.7% |
| 1940 | 3,681 | | 15.1% |
| 1950 | 5,780 | | 57.0% |
| 1960 | 7,378 | | 27.6% |
| 1970 | 8,716 | | 18.1% |
| 1980 | 10,065 | | 15.5% |
| 1990 | 9,646 | | −4.2% |
| 2000 | 10,419 | | 8.0% |
| 2010 | 11,899 | | 14.2% |
| 2020 | 12,346 | | 3.8% |
| 2022 (est.) | 12,702 | | 2.9% |
Source: U.S. Decennial Census; 2020 Census

=== 2020 census ===
As of the 2020 census, Blackfoot had a population of 12,346. The median age was 33.8 years. 28.4% of residents were under the age of 18 and 15.0% of residents were 65 years of age or older. For every 100 females there were 96.5 males, and for every 100 females age 18 and over there were 93.7 males age 18 and over.

98.6% of residents lived in urban areas, while 1.4% lived in rural areas.

There were 4,460 households in Blackfoot, of which 36.8% had children under the age of 18 living in them. Of all households, 46.2% were married-couple households, 17.7% were households with a male householder and no spouse or partner present, and 28.2% were households with a female householder and no spouse or partner present. About 27.4% of all households were made up of individuals and 12.1% had someone living alone who was 65 years of age or older.

There were 4,685 housing units, of which 4.8% were vacant. The homeowner vacancy rate was 1.4% and the rental vacancy rate was 3.9%.

Racial composition as of the 2020 census
| Race | Number | Percent |
|---|---|---|
| White | 9,582 | 77.6% |
| Black or African American | 51 | 0.4% |
| American Indian and Alaska Native | 479 | 3.9% |
| Asian | 76 | 0.6% |
| Native Hawaiian and Other Pacific Islander | 11 | 0.1% |
| Some other race | 1,008 | 8.2% |
| Two or more races | 1,139 | 9.2% |
| Hispanic or Latino (of any race) | 2,576 | 20.9% |

=== 2010 census ===
As of the 2010 census, there were 11,899 people, 4,229 households and 2,958 families living in the city. The population density was 2,041.0 inhabitants per square mile (788.0/km^{2}). There were 4,547 housing units at an average density of 779.9 per square mile (301.1/km^{2}). The racial makeup of the city was 83.1% White, 0.3% African American, 3.5% Native American, 1.1% Asian, 0.2% Pacific Islander, 9.1% from other races, and 2.8% from two or more races. Hispanic or Latino of any race were 18.4% of the population.

There were 4,229 households, of which 39.3% had children under the age of 18 living with them, 51.4% were married couples living together, 13.0% had a female householder with no husband present, 5.6% had a male householder with no wife present, and 30.1% were non-families. 25.6% of all households were made up of individuals, and 11.2% had someone living alone who was 65 years of age or older. The average household size was 2.74 and the average family size was 3.31.

The median age in the city was 30.8 years. 31.3% of residents were under the age of 18; 9.6% were between the ages of 18 and 24; 25.5% were from 25 to 44; 20.8% were from 45 to 64; and 12.8% were 65 years of age or older. The gender makeup of the city was 49.6% male and 50.4% female.

=== 2000 census ===
As of the 2000 census, there were 10,419 people, 3,685 households and 2,682 families living in the city. The population density was 1,926.4 inhabitants per square mile (743.8/km^{2}). There were 3,929 housing units at an average density of 726.4 per square mile (280.5/km^{2}). The racial makeup of the city was 86.76% White, 0.21% African American, 2.51% Native American, 1.09% Asian, 0.03% Pacific Islander, 6.33% from other races, and 3.06% from two or more races. Hispanic or Latino of any race were 13.17% of the population.

There were 3,685 households, of which 38.8% had children under the age of 18 living with them, 56.9% were married couples living together, 11.8% had a female householder with no husband present, and 27.2% were non-families. 23.7% of all households were made up of individuals, and 10.7% had someone living alone who was 65 years of age or older. The average household size was 2.75 and the average family size was 3.27.

31.2% of the population were under the age of 18, 10.9% from 18 to 24, 25.5% from 25 to 44, 18.9% from 45 to 64, and 13.4% who were 65 years of age or older. The median age was 31 years. For every 100 females, there were 96.5 males. For every 100 females age 18 and over, there were 91.3 males.

The median household income was $33,004 and the median family income was $36,553. Males had a median income of $31,489 compared with $20,625 for females. The per capita income for the city was $15,529. About 11.5% of families and 14.6% of the population were below the poverty line, including 22.4% of those under age 18 and 5.7% of those age 65 or over.

== Economy ==
Blackfoot claims the largest potato industry in any one area, and is known as the "Potato Capital of the World."

== Arts and culture ==
Blackfoot is the site of the Idaho Potato Museum, the location of the world's largest baked potato and potato chip, and the location of the Eastern Idaho State Fair.

== Education ==
Blackfoot is served by the Blackfoot School District #55 and the Snake River School District #52.

=== High schools ===
- Blackfoot High School
- Independence High School
- Snake River High School

=== Middle schools ===
- Mountain View Middle School
- Snake River Junior High School
- Snake River Middle School

=== Elementary schools ===
- Blackfoot Sixth Grade School
- Fort Hall Elementary School
- Groveland Elementary School
- Ridgecrest Elementary School
- Donald D. Stalker Elementary School
- I.T. Stoddard Elementary School
- Wapello Elementary School
- Riverside Elementary School
- Rockford Elementary
- Moreland Elementary

== Notable people ==
- Kimball Allen, writer and actor
- Myron Reed "Slim" Brundage, anarchist
- Josh Hill, professional football player
- Dixie Kiefer, U.S. Navy captain during WWII
- Larry Scott, bodybuilder and 1966 Mr. Olympia; born in Blackfoot
- Mike Simpson, U.S. Representative from Idaho's 2nd congressional district

== In popular culture ==
- Blackfoot is mentioned in the song "When Cowboys Didn't Dance" by Lonestar as the destination of a cattle drive.
