= Harold W. Burton =

American architect

Harold William Burton (October 23, 1887 – October 2, 1969) was an American architect with architectural works throughout the western United States and Canada. Burton was one of the most prolific architects of chapels, meetinghouses, tabernacles and temples for the Church of Jesus Christ of Latter-day Saints (LDS Church). In 1910 he opened an architectural firm with Hyrum Pope (Pope & Burton) in Salt Lake City, Utah. They particularly appreciated Frank Lloyd Wright and the Prairie School architectural style. As young architects, Pope & Burton won design competitions for two of their better-known works, the Cardston Alberta and Laie Hawaii temples of the LDS Church. Burton moved to Los Angeles, California in 1927 to set up another office in the firm with Pope. After Pope unexpectedly died in 1939, Burton established a new firm with his son Douglas W. Burton. Together they continued to design many buildings, including some for the church, and in 1955 Harold Burton became the chief supervising architect for the LDS Church. One of his final works was the Oakland California Temple. Aside from places of worship, Burton designed civic buildings and homes. Many of his works exist today, some of which are listed on the National Register of Historic Places.

== Notable works ==
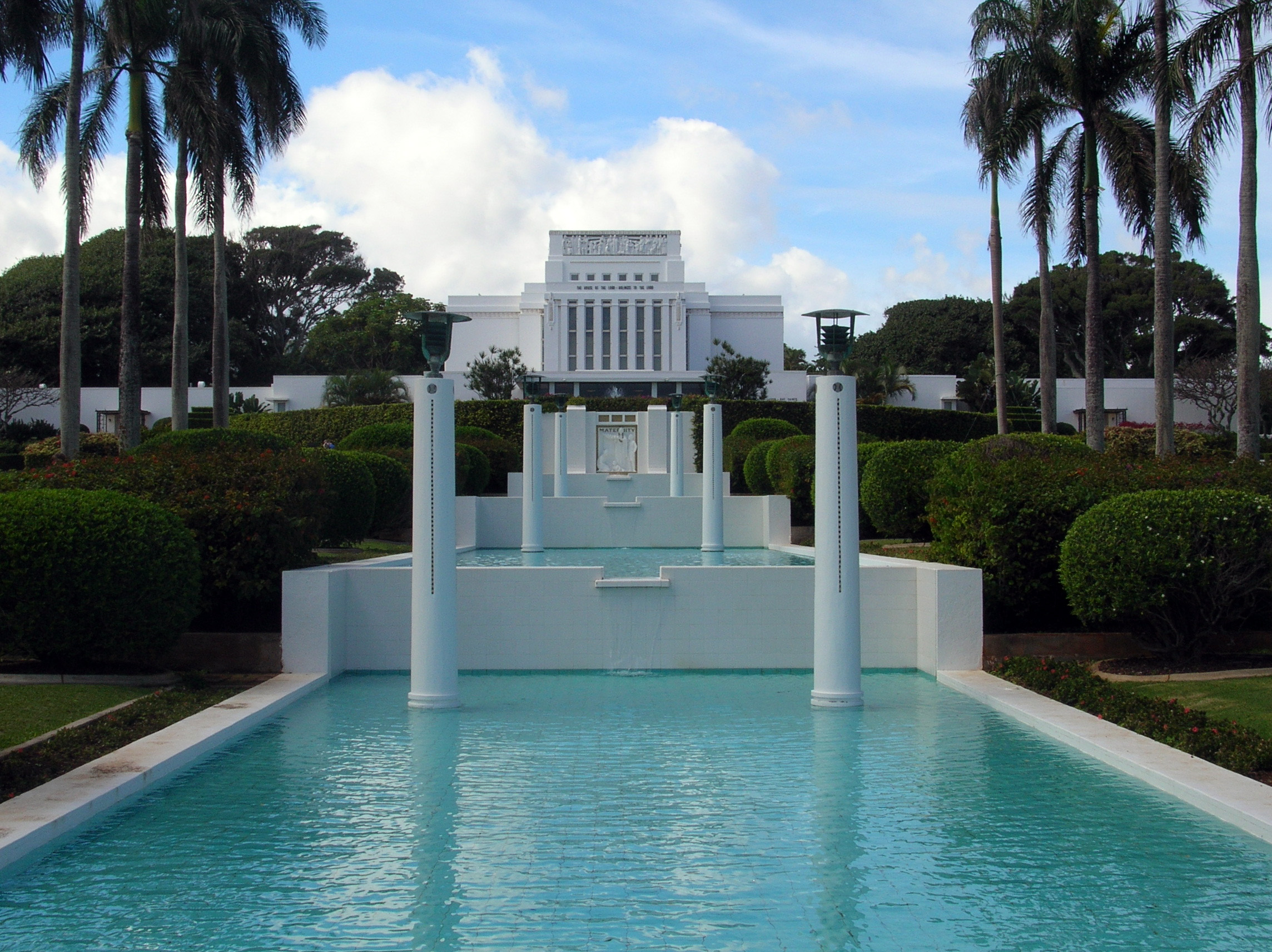
Laie Hawaii Temple (1919)

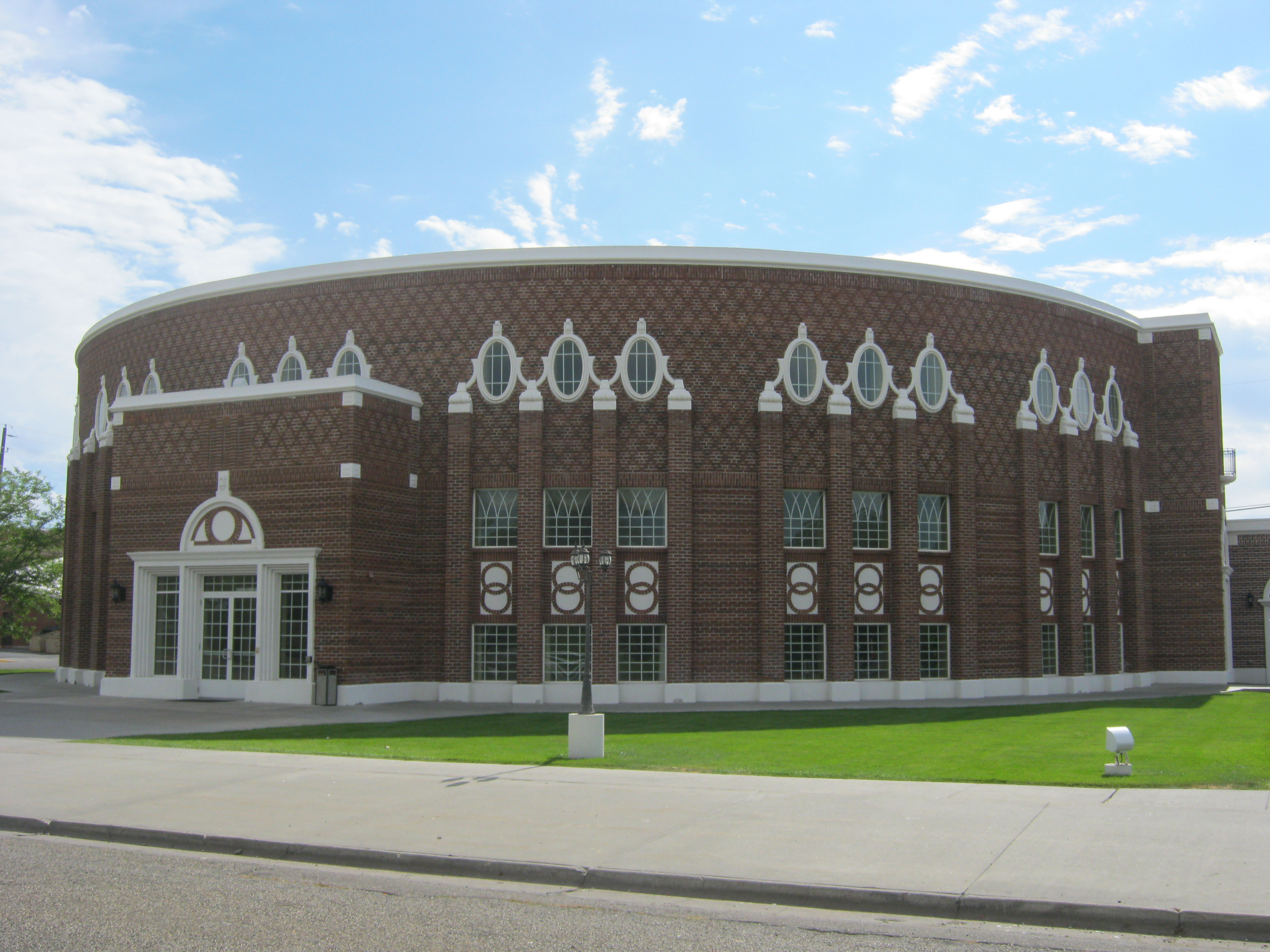
Blackfoot Tabernacle (1921) *NRHP listed

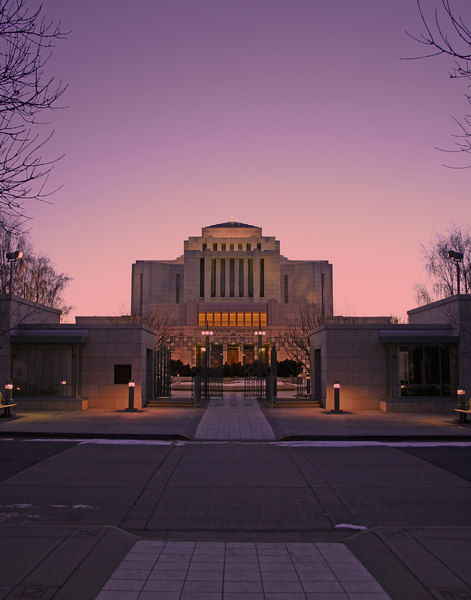
Cardston Alberta Temple (1923) *NHSC listed

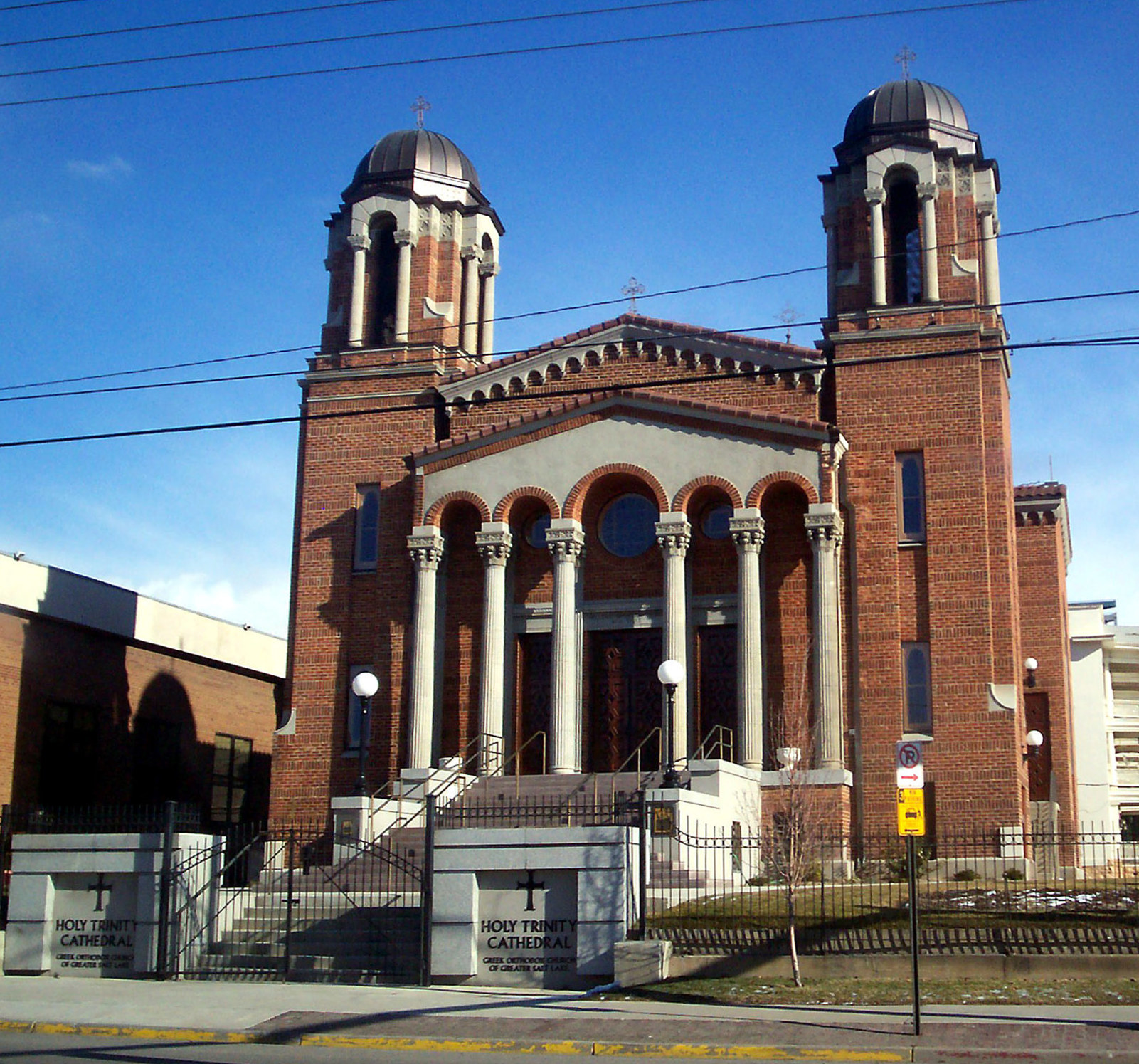
Holy Trinity Cathedral (Salt Lake City, Utah) (1923) *NRHP listed

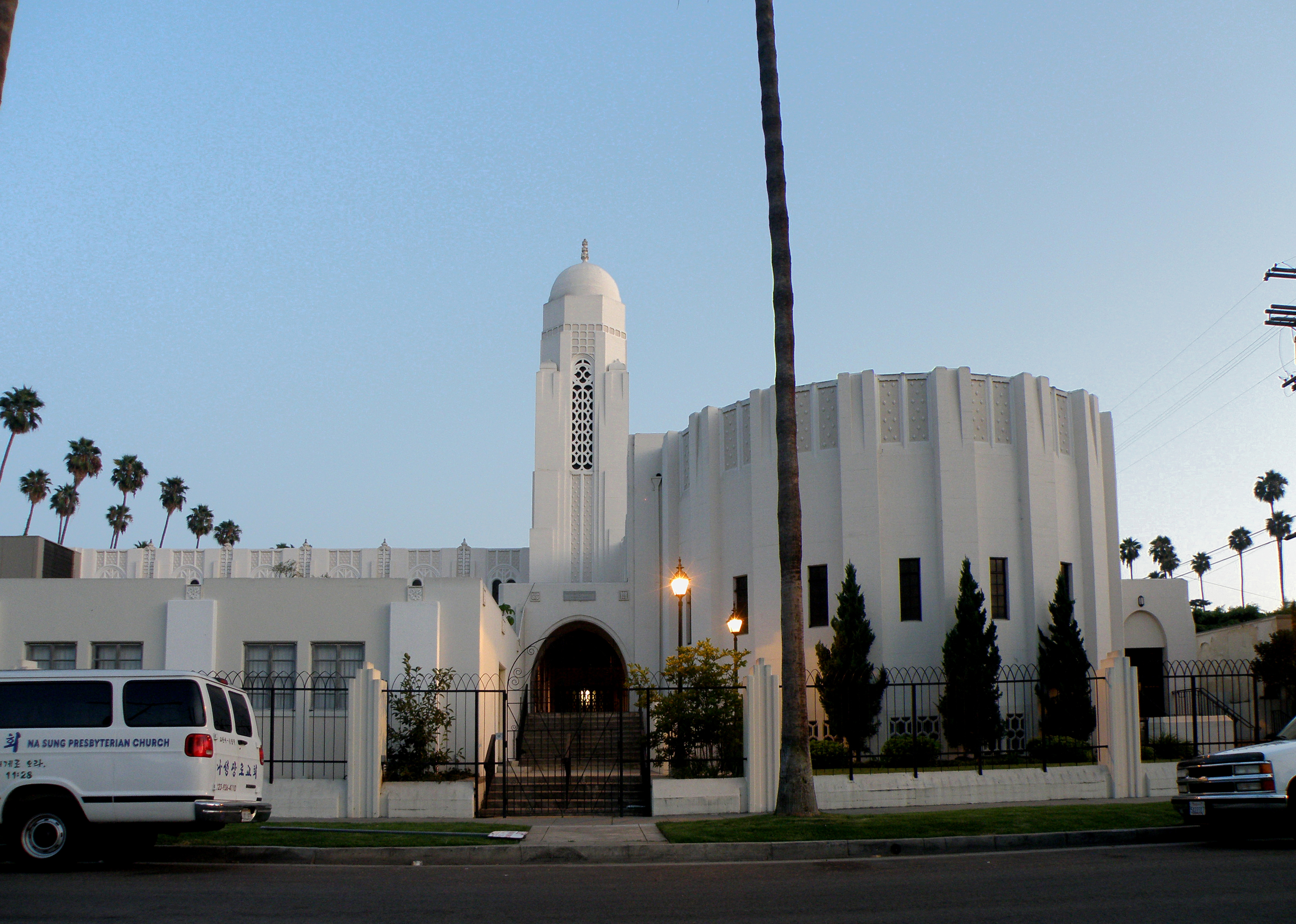
Wilshire Ward Chapel (1929) *LAHCM listed)

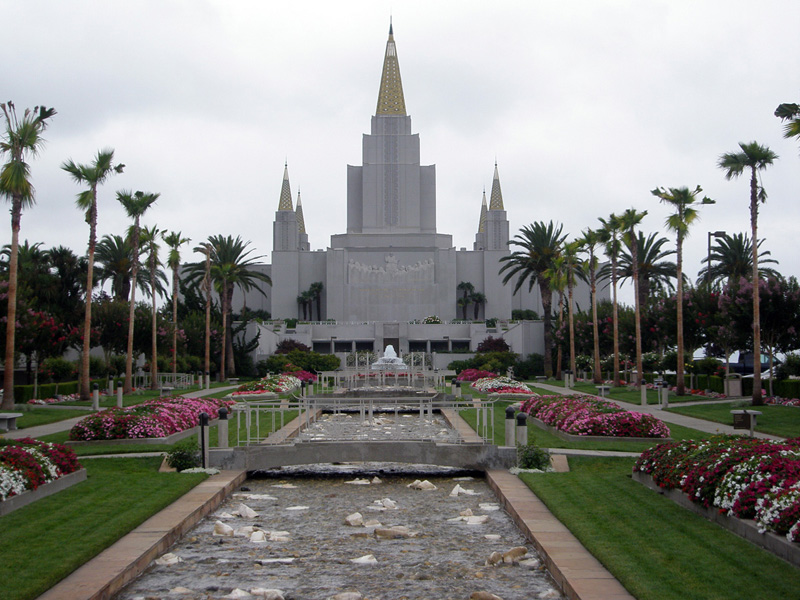
Oakland California Temple (1964)

=== Other existing works ===
- Malcolm and Elizabeth Keyser House (1913), NRHP-listed
- Julia Budge Nibley House (1914)
- Walter Scott Weiler House (1914)
- St. Paul's Episcopal Church - Salt Lake City (1917)
- Brooklyn Chapel Meetinghouse (1917) *Currently the Evening Star Baptist Church on Franklin and Gates
- Denver First Ward Meetinghouse (1918)
- Vernal Second Ward Chapel (1918)
- Centerville Ward Chapel (1918)
- Highland Park Ward Meetinghouse (1924) *NRHP listed in Highland Park Historic District (Salt Lake City, Utah)
- Ezra Thompson Building (1924), also known as the former Salt Lake Tribune building, by Pope & Burton, NRHP-listed
- Memorial House Facade (1926) Memory Grove (Salt Lake City)
- Northwestern States Mission Chapel - Portland, Oregon (1915) *Currently the Portland Friends of the Dhamma Center
- Provo First Ward Meetinghouse (1928)
- Phoenix Second Ward Meetinghouse, NRHP-listed in Roosevelt Historic District (Currently the Great Arizona Puppet Theater)
- University Ward Chapel (1929), NRHP-listed in University Neighborhood Historic District (Salt Lake City, Utah)
- Davis County Courthouse (1929)
- LeConte Stewart House, 172 W. 100 South Kaysville, Utah, NRHP-listed
- Honolulu Stake Tabernacle (1941)
- East Bay Interstake Center (1950's)
- McKay Foyer on Brigham Young University - Hawaii Campus (1957)
- Las Vegas Ninth Ward Meetinghouse (1961)

=== Demolished works ===
- Emigration Ward Chapel (1910-)
- Liberty Stake 1st Ward Meetinghouse (1911-1976)
- Park Stake First Ward Meetinghouse (1913-1976) *Previously NRHP listed
- Nephi First and Second Ward Chapel (1915)
- Hyde Park Ward Chapel (1918)

== See also ==
- Harold W. and Evelyn Burton House, in Holladay, Utah, a mansion/home of Harold W. Burton
- John H. Burton, another Salt Lake City architect
