= Durrel A. Woolsey =

American Mormon leader

Second Quorum of the Seventy
- March 31, 1990 – September 30, 1995
- Called by: Ezra Taft Benson
- End reason: Honorably released

Personal details
- Born: Durrel Arden Woolsey; June 12, 1926; Escalante, Utah, United States
- Died: May 13, 2019 (aged 92); Utah County, Utah, United States

Durrel Arden Woolsey (June 12, 1926 – May 13, 2019) was an American oil executive and general authority of the Church of Jesus Christ of Latter-day Saints (LDS Church) from 1990 to 1995. He was a member of the Second Quorum of the Seventy.

Woolsey was born in Escalante, Utah to W. Arden Woolsey and his wife, Ruby Riddle. Durrel Woolsey lived in Escalante until age 16 when he moved with his family to Cedar City, Utah. After graduating from high school in the spring of 1944, Woolsey joined the United States Navy. He was stationed in the Pacific theatre and his ship was attacked multiple times by Kamikaze planes.

In 1946, Woolsey married LaRae Wood, who he had met in high school, in the St. George Temple. They then moved to Trona, California and later to Taft, California, where Woolsey was a counselor to a bishop for ten years. He later moved to Stockton, California. He served there for eight years in the stake presidency and another eight years as stake president.

At various times, Woolsey studied at the University of the Pacific in Stockton and also at Princeton University. Woolsey worked for several years for Standard Oil Company, and in 1970 established the independent Woolsey Oil Company.

At the time he was called as a general authority, Woolsey was serving as president of the LDS Church's Arizona Tempe Mission. After he was a general authority, he served as president of the Oakland California Temple from 1996 to 1999.

Woolsey and his wife are the parents of three children. Woolsey died at his home on May 13, 2019.
