= Oakland California Temple =

Latter-day Saints Temple in Oakland, California, US

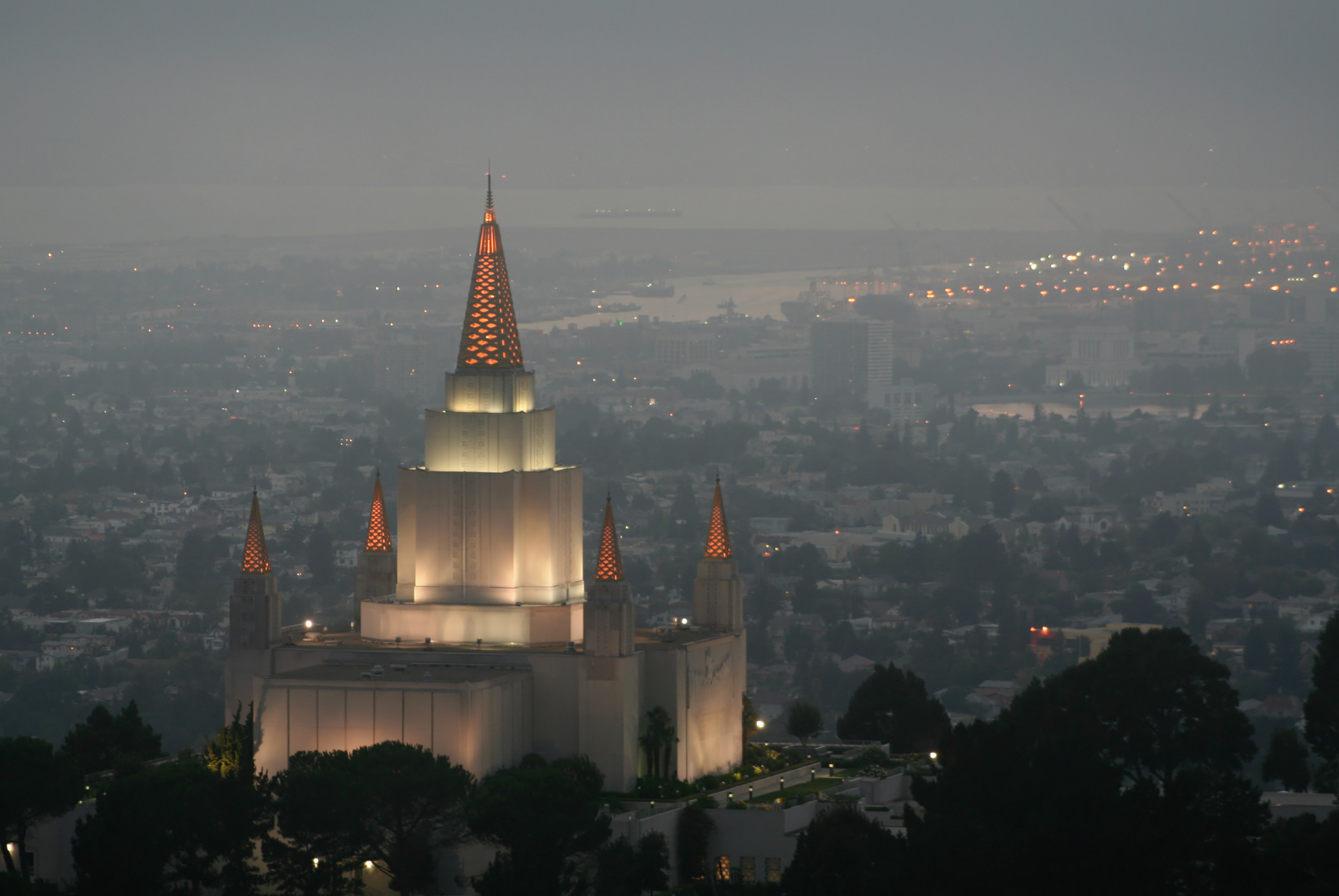
- Interactive map of Oakland California Temple
- Number: 13
- Dedication: November 17, 1964, by David O. McKay
- Site: 18.1 acres (7.3 ha)
- Floor area: 80,157 ft^{2} (7,446.8 m^{2})
- Height: 170 ft (52 m)
- Official website • News & images

Church chronology
← London England Temple	Oakland California Temple	→ Ogden Utah Temple

Additional information
- Announced: January 23, 1961, by David O. McKay
- Groundbreaking: May 26, 1962, by David O. McKay
- Open house: October 5–31, 1964; May 11 – June 1, 2019 (following renovations)
- Rededicated: June 16, 2019, by Dallin H. Oaks
- Current president: John C. Hodgman
- Designed by: Harold W. Burton
- Location: Oakland, California, United States
- Coordinates: 37°48′28″N 122°11′57″W
- Exterior finish: Sierra white granite over reinforced concrete
- Design: Modern, five-spire design
- Baptistries: 1
- Ordinance rooms: 4 (Movie, stationary)
- Sealing rooms: 7
- Clothing rental: Yes
- Visitors' center: Yes

The Oakland California Temple (formerly the Oakland Temple) is a temple of the Church of Jesus Christ of Latter-day Saints in Oakland, California. Notable for its five-spire design influenced by Asian architecture, the temple stands on a hill with panoramic views of the San Francisco Bay Area. The complex, sometimes referred to as Temple Hill, includes a visitors' center, a church employment center, a materials distribution center, an auditorium, an inter-stake center, a rooftop terrace, and gardens where photoshoots for quinceañeras and other celebrations take place.

The church purchased the site in 1943 and construction began in 1962. Following public tours in 1964, the temple was dedicated, and admittance became reserved for church members with a temple recommend. The temple stands on top of the Hayward Fault Zone; it underwent major renovations and seismic upgrades, closing from 1989 to 1990 following the Loma Prieta earthquake and again from 2018 to 2019.

The temple's architecture, designed by Harold W. Burton, incorporates Art Deco and mid-century elements. Interior decorations include dark cherry wood ornamentation, along with original artwork of Jesus Christ and the California landscape. Since 1978, annual music and dance performances have accompanied the Christmas light displays, reflecting on the holiday themes and the narrative of Jesus Christ's birth. Temple Hill used to host "temple pageants", but they have since been discontinued. The reception of the temple has been mostly positive. Jen Woo of Architectural Digest said that the temple is an "architectural gem", Madeline Wells of SFGate said the temple is "one of the Bay Area's most beautiful buildings", while the New York Times has stated that some have complained about the light pollution coming from the temple.

== History ==
The building of the Oakland Temple, as well as other church temples in California, was considered as early as 1847. Church members who traveled by ship around Cape Horn to California were told by Brigham Young that "in the process of time, the shores of the Pacific may yet be overlooked from the Temple of the Lord."

In 1942, David O. McKay, then second counselor in the church's First Presidency, inspected the site where the temple now stands. The 14.5 acres (59,000 m^{2}) were purchased by the church on January 28, 1943. The temple was announced in 1961, and construction began in 1962. In October 1964, the temple opened briefly for visitors to tour. Then, after McKay dedicated the temple with a prayer in November 1964, admittance became reserved for church members holding a current temple recommend. A visitors' center was constructed adjacent to the temple in 1992.

Beginning February 2018, the temple closed for renovations. The restoration updated the electrical system, refurbished furniture upholstery, replaced paneling, restored front door functionality, and, leveraging technological advances, repaired the originally leaking reflecting pool. A new visitors' waiting area was added that features windows which gather light reflected from the pool outside. The original design for the temple did not include windows; however, the renovation introduced windows to the design. Before renovations, this temple was unique among temples of the church due to it being the only one without windows. This change was partly to create a theater-like setting, as this was the first temple to feature a film presentation of the endowment ceremony instead of a live version. The original design was meant to showcase modern air-conditioning and lighting advances, due to Burton's desire to build a building "without windows puncturing the facade". As occurred in 1964, when renovations were complete, a public open house was held from May 11 through June 1, 2019, excluding Sundays. The temple was rededicated on June 16, 2019, by Dallin H. Oaks.

In 2020, like all the church's temples, the temple was closed for a time in response to the COVID-19 pandemic. The temple reopened for normal services on April 19, 2022.

== Temple Hill site ==
Besides the Oakland California Temple, there are several other buildings on the Temple Hill site. The inter-stake center, built in the 1950s, remains the oldest church building at the site. Originally referred to as the tri-stake center, the building served the San Francisco, Oakland, and Berkeley stakes. The center includes two chapels for sacrament meetings, an auditorium, a gymnasium, several classrooms, and offices. As of May 2021, the building is used by 14 congregations in the English, Spanish, Chinese, and Khmer languages.

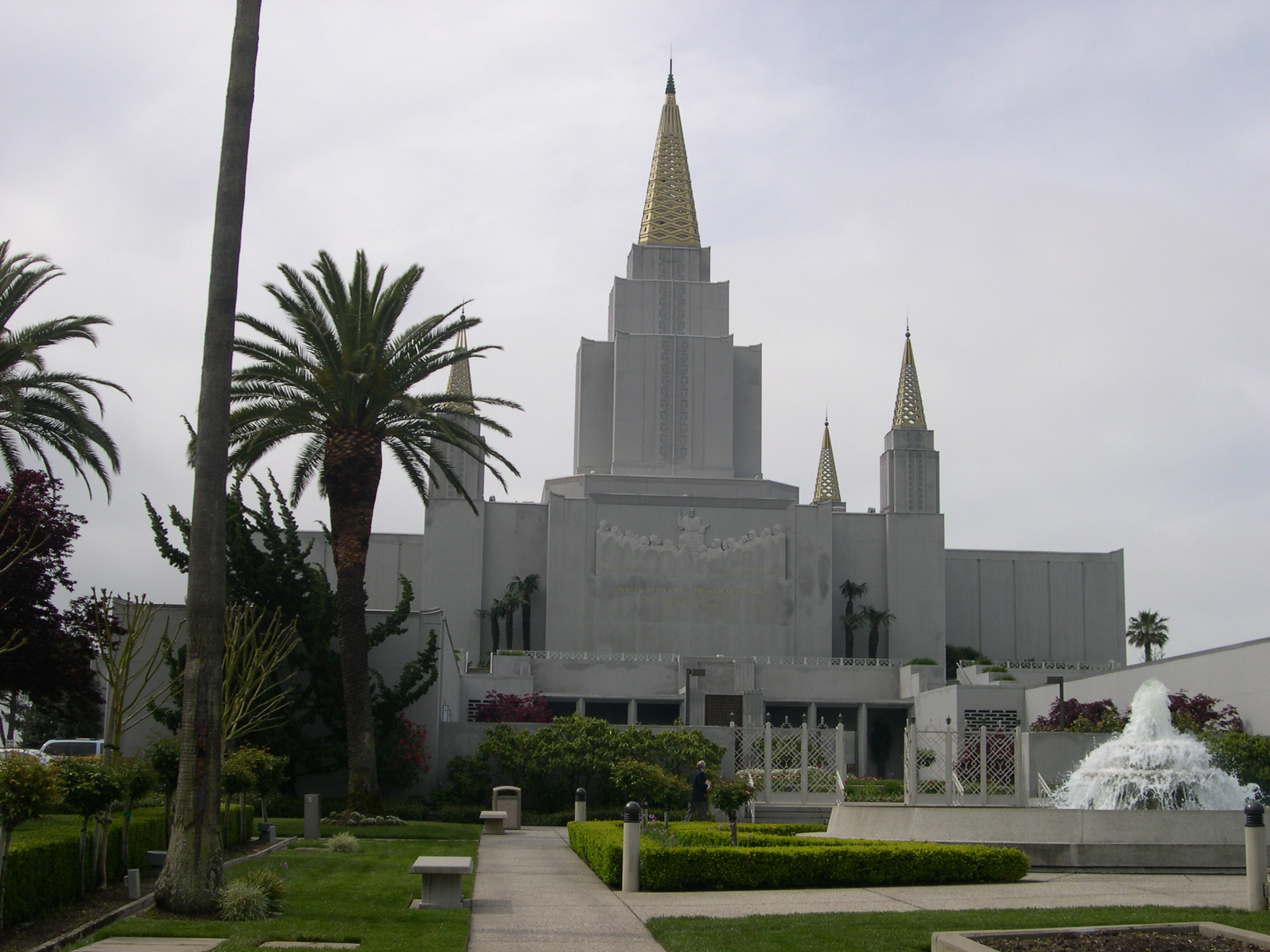
The Oakland California Temple

The nearby auditorium seats 1,600 people, and has a 60-foot (18 m) stage. When more seating is needed, the auditorium can be extended into a cultural hall that is large enough to fit two full-size basketball courts. The NBA's Golden State Warriors previously used the cultural hall as a practice facility. The concert hall is home to the Temple Hill Symphony Orchestra, Temple Hill Choir, Behold Dance Collective, and the Temple Hill Dance Company. In addition, the concert hall hosts other musicians, singers, and performance groups. Besides the three resident organizations and the temple pageant, many Brigham Young University performing arts groups have performed in the auditorium.

The Temple Hill Symphony Orchestra was formed in 1985. It has 52 members, about a third of whom are not Latter-day Saints. It has other sponsors besides the church and is a non-profit organization that offers free concerts. As of February 2024, Jay Trottier has been the conductor, a position he has held since 2012.

=== Visitors' center ===
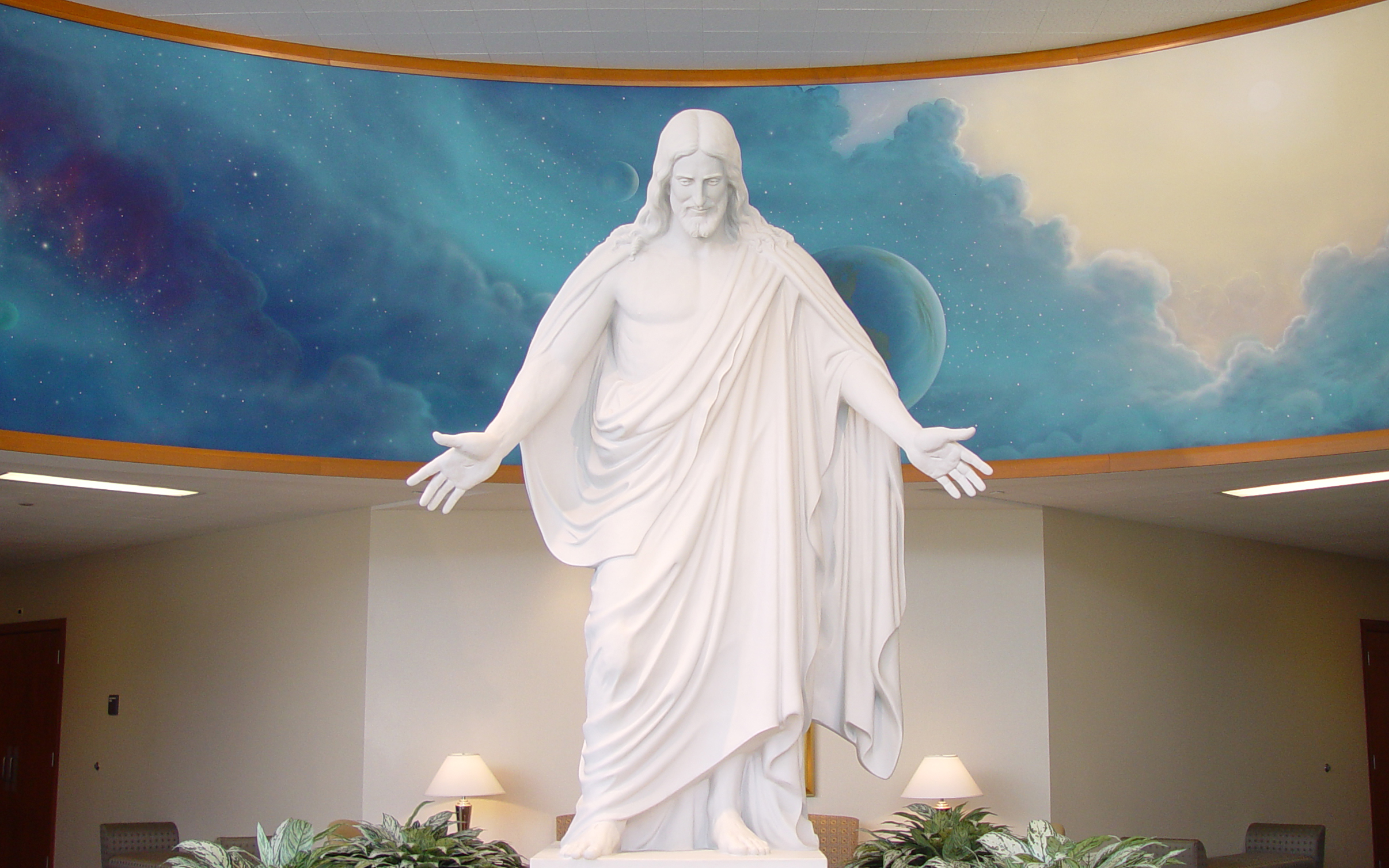
A copy of Bertel Thorvaldsen's Christus in the visitors' center

Adjacent to the temple is a visitors' center which includes artwork, displays, and a reproduction of Thorvaldsen's Christus statue. The visitors' center is staffed by volunteers, and is open to the public. The visitors’ center was remodeled in 2004, receiving new exhibits emphasizing the life of Jesus Christ and the organization of the church by Joseph Smith.

The site includes a FamilySearch Center (FSC), both church employment and materials distribution centers, the headquarters of the California Oakland–San Francisco Mission, and a small memorial to the Brooklyn. Set on 18.1 acres (7.3 ha), the temple grounds include a garden with integrated water features, drawing local photographers. The FSC offers volunteer assistance to individuals interested in tracing their family history. On average, four out of five visitors to the FSC at Temple Hill are not members of the church.

=== Christmas ===
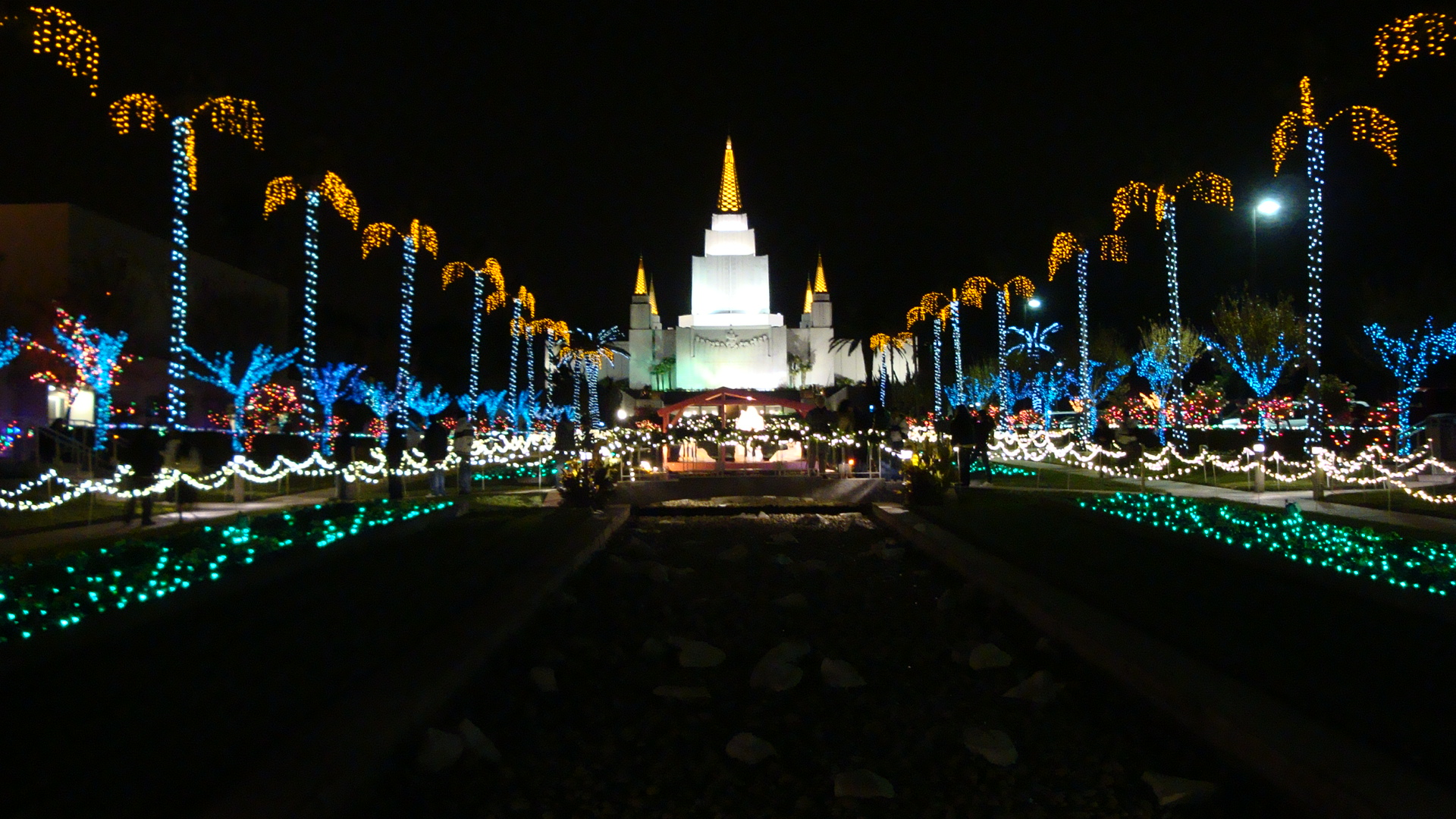
The temple during the Christmas season

Since 1978, the temple and visitors' center have hosted an annual Christmas lights display, starting with 50,000 lights and expanding to 500,000 by 1998. In addition to the lights, various displays and artwork of the birth of Jesus and the Christmas narrative are placed on the temple grounds and in the visitors' center. The displays on the temple grounds and in the visitors' center are part of a broader holiday observance at the temple.

Music and dance performances that reflect on the themes of Christmas and the narrative of Jesus Christ's birth occur each year. The Nutcracker ballet, a sing along of Handel's Messiah, and musical performances by Jenny Oaks Baker, have taken place during the Christmas Season at the Temple Hill Auditorium.

=== Hayward Fault ===
The Hayward Fault runs directly underneath the auditorium building. The slowly creeping fault has offset minor parts of the building, and led to the formation of cracks on the pavement from time to time. The rate of creep is about 0.6 inches (16 mm) per year, which may alleviate tension in the fault. The fault zone is regarded as dangerous, with geologists in 2009 estimating a 33% chance of a large earthquake occurring before the year 2040. The auditorium and temple were closed for refit after the 1989 Loma Prieta earthquake, and opened a year later in October 1990. A 4.2 magnitude strike-slip earthquake occurred in the area in July 2007. The auditorium and temple closed again for seismic retrofit in February 2018, while the visitors' center and gardens remained open. The work was finished in May 2019. According to a report from Philip Stofer of the United States Geological Survey, "The temple is one of the most visible manmade features along the Hayward Fault and can be seen from throughout the Oakland area."

== Design ==
Harold W. Burton designed the temple's structure in 1962, combining three distinct design styles: Mid-century Modern, Asian, and Art Deco. Improvements during the 2019 renovation were led by architect David Hunter and interior designer Karen Willardson. Through the front courtyard are stairways which led to the temple rooftop garden terrace. From the temple grounds and terrace, several neighboring landmarks are visible, including downtown Oakland, the Bay Bridge, Yerba Buena Island, downtown San Francisco, the Sutro Tower, and the Golden Gate Bridge. The grounds have flowers, palm trees, and water features, including fountains and a waterfall. Additionally, local photographers use the Temple Hill gardens as a photoshoot location for quinceañeras and other celebrations.

The temple was built on an 18.3-acre (74,000 m^{2}) plot, has four ordinance rooms (used for the endowment), seven sealing rooms, and has a total floor area of 95,000 square feet (8,800 m^{2}). The temple and its associated complex of buildings has been referred to by church members as Temple Hill.

=== Exterior ===
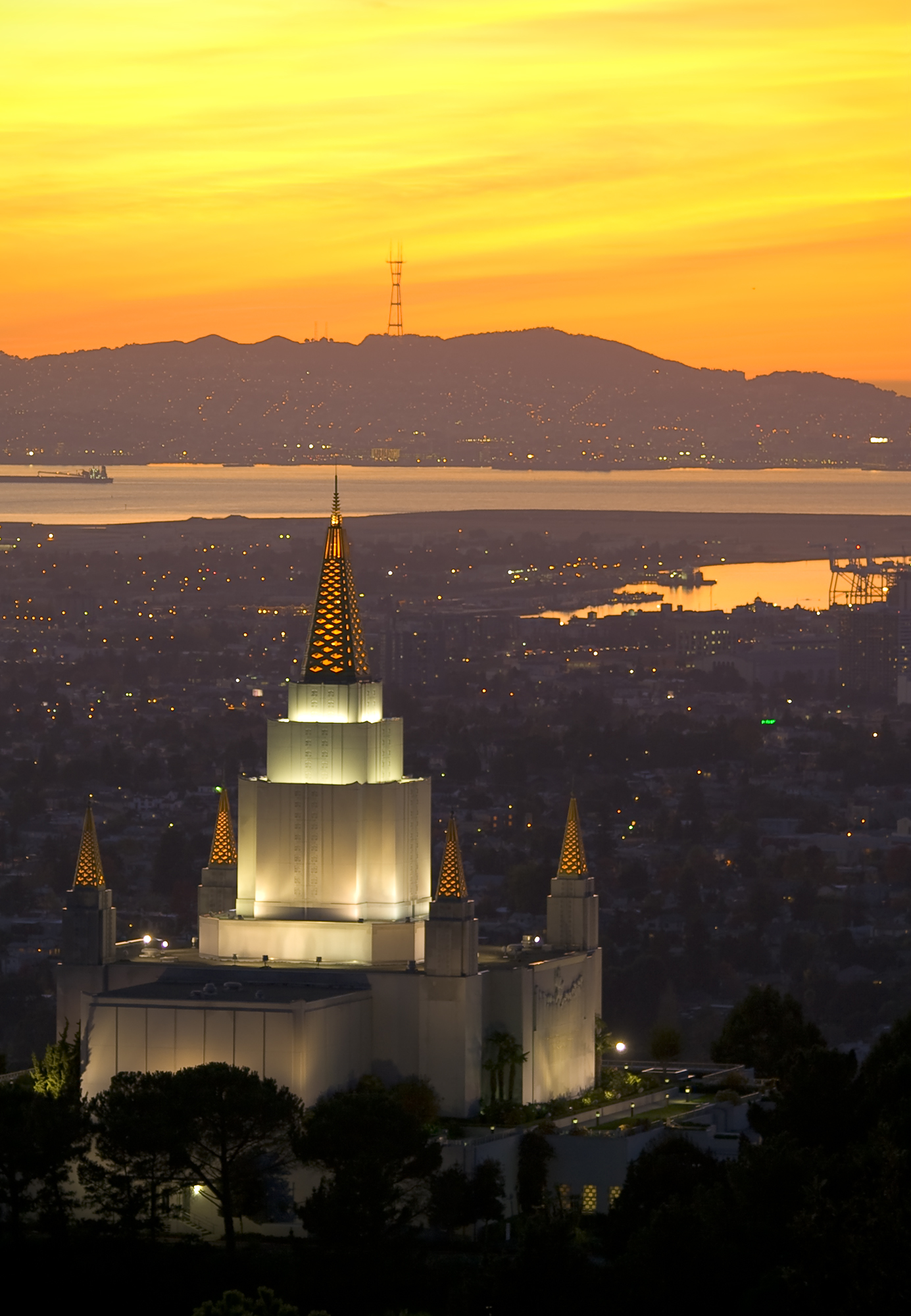
The temple and Oakland at sunset, with San Francisco's Sutro Tower visible in the distance

This is the church's only temple built with a modern five-spire design. The tallest of the five spires reaches 170 feet (52 m). The exterior of the temple is made of reinforced concrete faced with sierra white granite from Raymond, California. On the north and south faces of the temple are two decorative friezes; it is the last temple of the church to have such.

The temple, illuminated at night, stands out in the Bay Area and is referred to as a beacon. Claudia Cowan of Fox News reported that it has been dubbed the "beacon on the hill", underscoring its prominent visibility. The Federal Aviation Administration uses the temple as a landmark for visual navigation. The New York Times reported that the bright lights have prompted some complaints about light pollution, along with the temple running a monthly utility bill up to $35,000.

=== Interior ===
The interior was designed to focus on Jesus Christ. Sam Matthews of the Tracy Press said: "The temple’s interior décor is subdued, with shades of tan and brown and traditional furnishings." Religious themed paintings and others depicting California are found throughout the temple. The walls feature white oak paneling accented by marble flooring. The temple houses a diverse collection of art, including murals, relief artwork, and paintings. This includes relief murals depicting Jesus Christ in the Garden of Gethsemane and a representation of Adam and Eve.

Many areas feature wall-to-wall mirrors, crystal lighting fixtures, and seating with Asian-inspired designs. Some of the features of are used for baptisms include gold leaf ceiling decorations, marble pillars, and bronze banisters. Sealing rooms contain panels of dark cherry wood, marble altars with backlighting, and mirrors placed to create an effect of infinite reflections. Some sealing rooms also include ceilings with a barrel vault design.

Jen Woo of Architectural Digest noted the interior design of the temple has "an abundance of Asian-inspired elements in reference to the diversity of the area" and its design is "an architectural gem". The design "echo[es] a Buddhist temple" to "incorporate the local culture of [the temple's] surroundings," explained Madeline Wells of SFGate. Wells also stated that the temple is one of the most beautiful buildings in the Bay Area with whimsical spires. The executive director of the church's Temple Department, Larry Wilson, also noted the building was partly modeled after the Taj Mahal and Angkor Wat.

== Presidents ==
Since its dedication in 1964, the temple has been overseen by temple presidents and matrons, who oversee all its operations. Each typically serve a term of about three years. The first president, Delbert Franklin Wright, served from 1964 to 1968. As of 2022, John C Hodgman is serving as president. Notable presidents include Lorenzo Hoopes (1985–1990) and Durrel A. Woolsey (1996–1999).

== And it Came to Pass Pageant ==
In the nearby meetinghouse, local church members performed a pageant (an annual theatrical production) for many years. The pageant, commonly known as the "Temple Pageant", was a musical stage production rehearsing the history and legacy of the church. It was one of only a few "temple pageants" around the country. Until its retirement, it was the only such pageant performed indoors as well as the only one to be fully accompanied by a live orchestra. Initially, the pageant consisted of three acts performed over three consecutive nights; however, it was eventually shortened to an hour and a half. In November 2007, the pageant was officially retired due to concerns about the cost of production, and because the majority of the membership around the globe would never see the pageants.

== See also ==
- The Church of Jesus Christ of Latter-day Saints in California
- Comparison of temples of The Church of Jesus Christ of Latter-day Saints
- List of temples of The Church of Jesus Christ of Latter-day Saints by geographic region
- List of temples of The Church of Jesus Christ of Latter-day Saints
- Temple architecture (Latter-day Saints)
