= Neumont University =

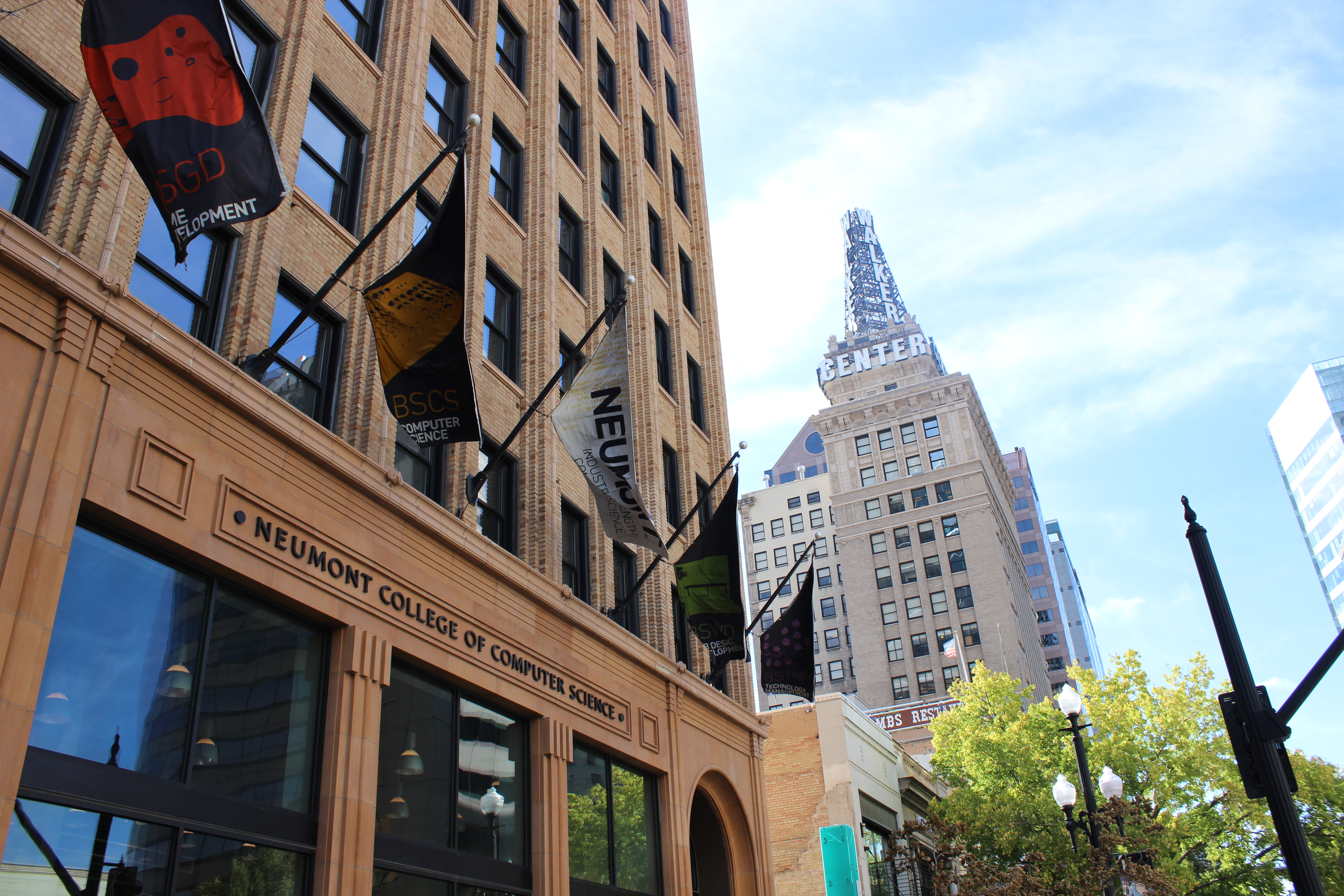
- Former names: Northface University (2003-2007); Neumont University (2007-2017); Neumont College of Computer Science (2017-2025)
- Type: Private for-profit career college
- Established: 2003
- Founders: Graham Doxey, Scott McKinley, and Marlow Einelund
- President: Aaron Reed
- Students: 484
- Location: 143 South Main Street, Salt Lake City, Utah; 40.767221°N 111.889951°W
- Website: www.neumont.edu

Neumont University (formerly Neumont College of Computer Science, originally Northface University) is a private for-profit career college in Salt Lake City, Utah. It was founded in 2003 by Graham Doxey, Scott McKinley, and Marlow Einelund. The college focuses on applied computer science and is accredited by Northwest Commission on Colleges and Universities.

== Academics ==
Neumont's degree programs focus on the computer sciences offering three-year degrees in Computer Science, Business Technology Management (no longer offered for incoming students), Software and Game Development, Web Design and Development (also no longer offered for incoming students), Information Systems and Cybersecurity, and Software Engineering. In place of Business Technology Management and Web Design and Development, they now offer Bachelor's Degrees in Applied AI & Data Engineering and Artificial Intelligence Engineering. They also offer a Master of Science degree in Applied Artificial Intelligence. The college is accredited by the Northwest Commission on Colleges and Universities to award associate and bachelor's degrees in Computer Science.

== Recent history ==
From July through September 2007, Neumont briefly expanded to Virginia, leasing a suite in the Dulles Town Center mall. The expansion was cancelled after one academic quarter.

In August 2012, Neumont University announced plans to relocate its academic facilities and student housing to 143 South Main Street, Salt Lake City, an 11-story art deco building which formerly housed The Salt Lake Tribune. The school officially relocated to its downtown Salt Lake City location in June 2013, with the first new cohort of students beginning classes in October.

On July 28, 2017, president Shaun McAlmont announced the institution's name change from Neumont University to Neumont College of Computer Science.

On October 9, 2025, president Aaron Reed announced the institution's name change from Neumont College of Computer Science to Neumont University.

=== Presidents ===
- Graham Doxey (2003–2007)
- Edward H. Levine (2007–2015)
- Shaun McAlmont (2015–2017)
- Aaron Reed (2017–present)
