= Honolulu Stake Tabernacle =

LDS Church place of worship

Religion
- Affiliation: The Church of Jesus Christ of Latter-day Saints

Location
- Location: Honolulu, Hawaii, United States
- Interactive map of Honolulu Stake Tabernacle
- Coordinates: 21°17′59.024″N 157°50′11.992″W

Architecture
- Architect: Harold W. Burton
- Groundbreaking: 1940

The Honolulu Stake Tabernacle, formerly known as the Oahu Stake Tabernacle, is a historic tabernacle and current meetinghouse of the Church of Jesus Christ of Latter-day Saints located in Honolulu, Hawaii. The tabernacle was built between 1940 and 1941, and was dedicated on August 17, 1941 by David O. McKay, second counselor in the church's First Presidency.

== History ==
The property for the tabernacle, located at 1560 S. Beretania, was selected and purchased by the church from the Campbell family in 1935 for $24,000. The design was completed by Harold W. Burton, who lived in a shack on the plot for a period of time. Ground was broken to begin construction in 1940 and construction was contracted to local church member Ralph Woolley, who built the Laie Hawaii Temple.

The main chapel within the tabernacle seats 2,400 and the 140 ft tower was the second largest structure on Oahu at the time of construction. The tabernacle was completed at a cost of $275,000 and was dedicated on August 17, 1941 by McKay, who specifically prayed that it would be protected in the event of a war. Pearl Harbor, just 10 miles away, was bombed less than four months later.

The building has been remodeled three times since construction was completed: 1974, 1987, and 1997. The building currently functions as a meetinghouse, rather than a tabernacle, with regular services on Sunday as well as social events throughout the week. The meetinghouse currently serves six wards (or congregations), including Tongan, Chuukese, and young single adult wards. The building also serves as the stake center for the Honolulu Hawaii Stake.

In February 2023, the tabernacle was visited by church apostle Gerrit W. Gong, who spoke with members about family history. A video of the visit to other parts of the island was shown at the RootsTech Conference later that year. Just over one year later church apostle Dieter F. Uchtdorf spoke with local church members and leaders from across the island of Oahu.

== See also ==
- The Church of Jesus Christ of Latter-day Saints in Hawaii
- Architecture of the Church of Jesus Christ of Latter-day Saints
