= Hyrum Pope =

American architect (1880–1939)

Hyrum Conrad Pope (December 2, 1880 – August 24, 1939) was a German-born architect with important architectural works throughout the western United States and Canada. Pope was born in Fürth, Bavaria and immigrated to the United States as a teenager. He went to school at the Art Institute of Chicago where he was influenced in the Prairie School architectural style. In 1910, he opened an architectural firm with Harold W. Burton (Pope & Burton) in Salt Lake City, Utah. Pope designed a variety of places of worship for many faiths, civic buildings and homes, some of which are listed on the National Register of Historic Places.

== Temple architecture ==
As young architects, Pope & Burton won design competitions for two of their most well-known works, the Cardston Alberta and Laie Hawaii temples for the Church of Jesus Christ of Latter-day Saints (LDS Church). Later on he became chairman of the Board of Temple Architects for the church and oversaw the design and construction of the Idaho Falls Idaho and Los Angeles California temples. At the dedication proceedings of the Cardston Alberta Temple, Pope remarked that temple architecture "should be ancient as well as modern. It should express all the power which we associate with God."

== Personal life ==
Pope married Eliza Rutishauser. His son Theodore Pope also became an architect. Pope died unexpectedly of an apparent heart attack in Preston, Idaho in 1939 while inspecting the construction of the Franklin County Courthouse.

== Notable works ==
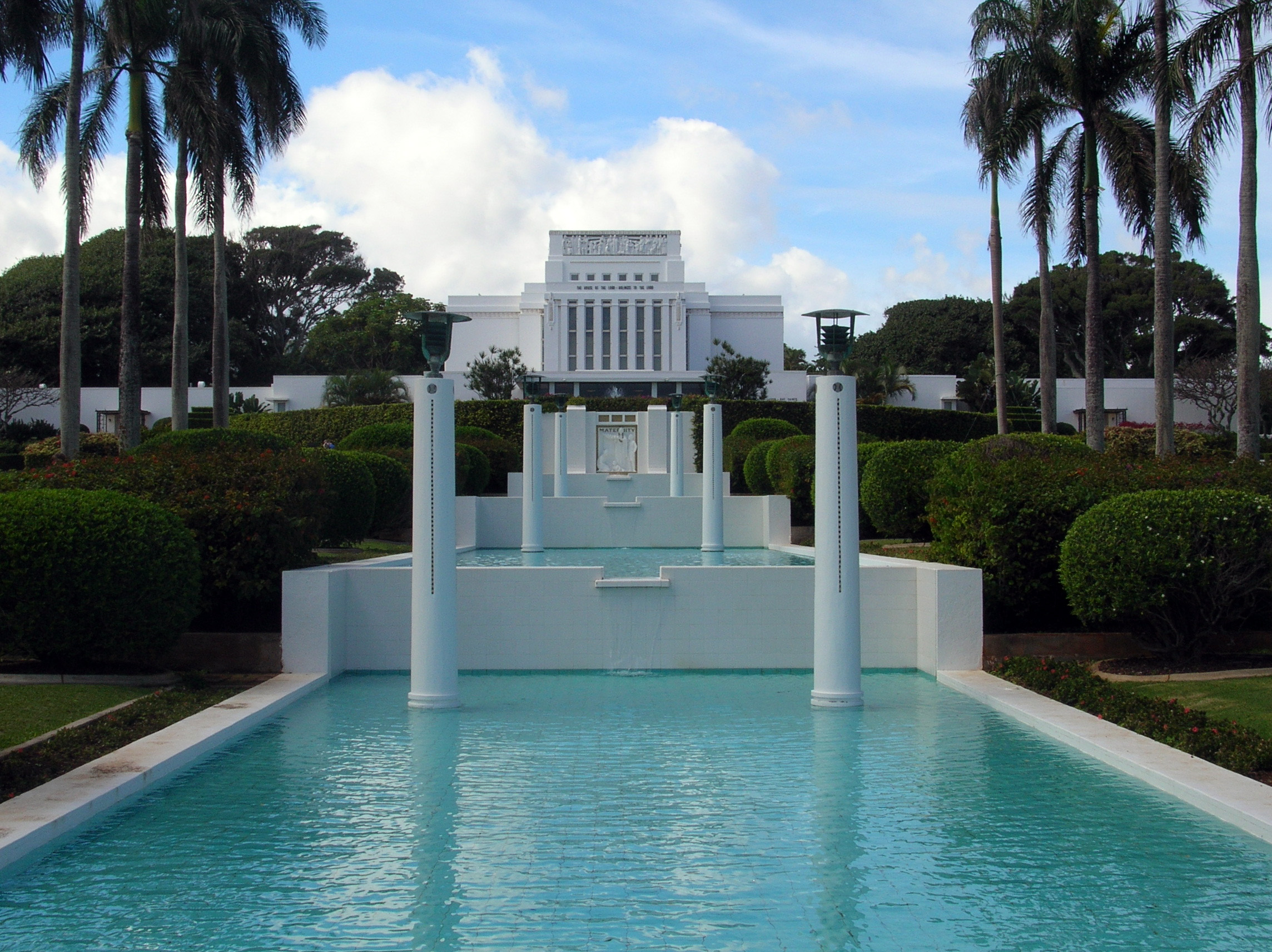
Laie Hawaii Temple (1919)

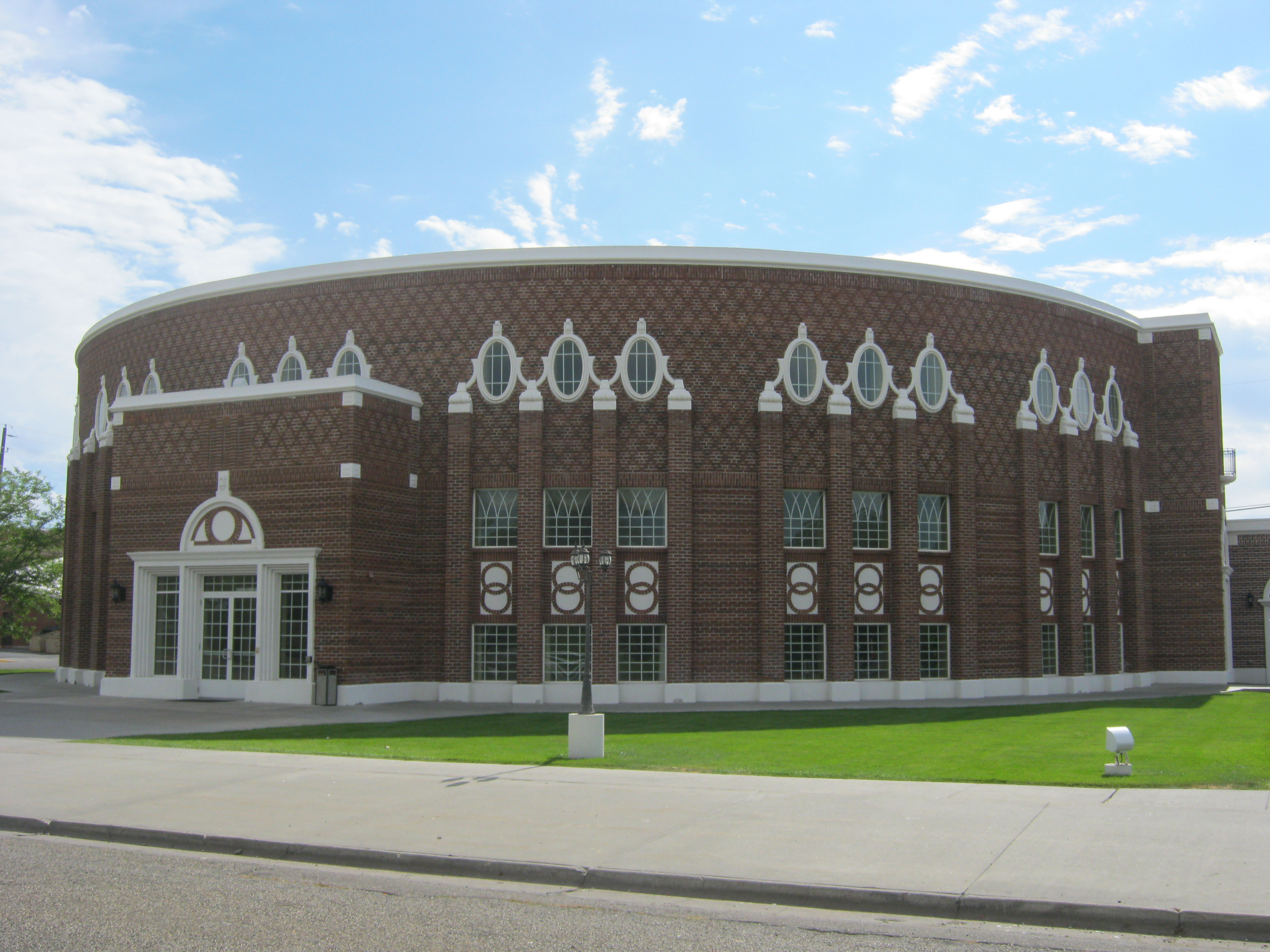
Blackfoot Tabernacle (1921) *NRHP listed

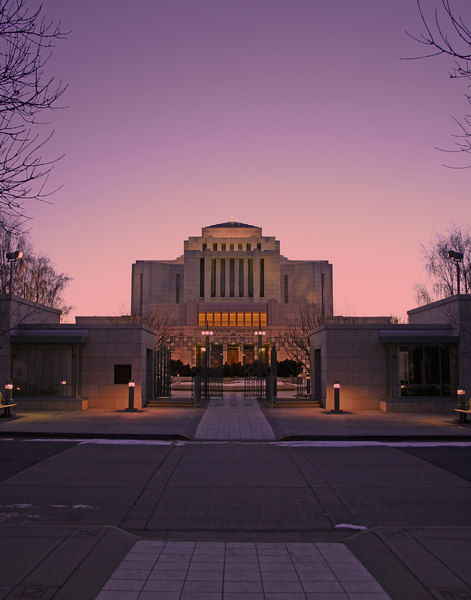
Cardston Alberta Temple (1923) *NHSC listed

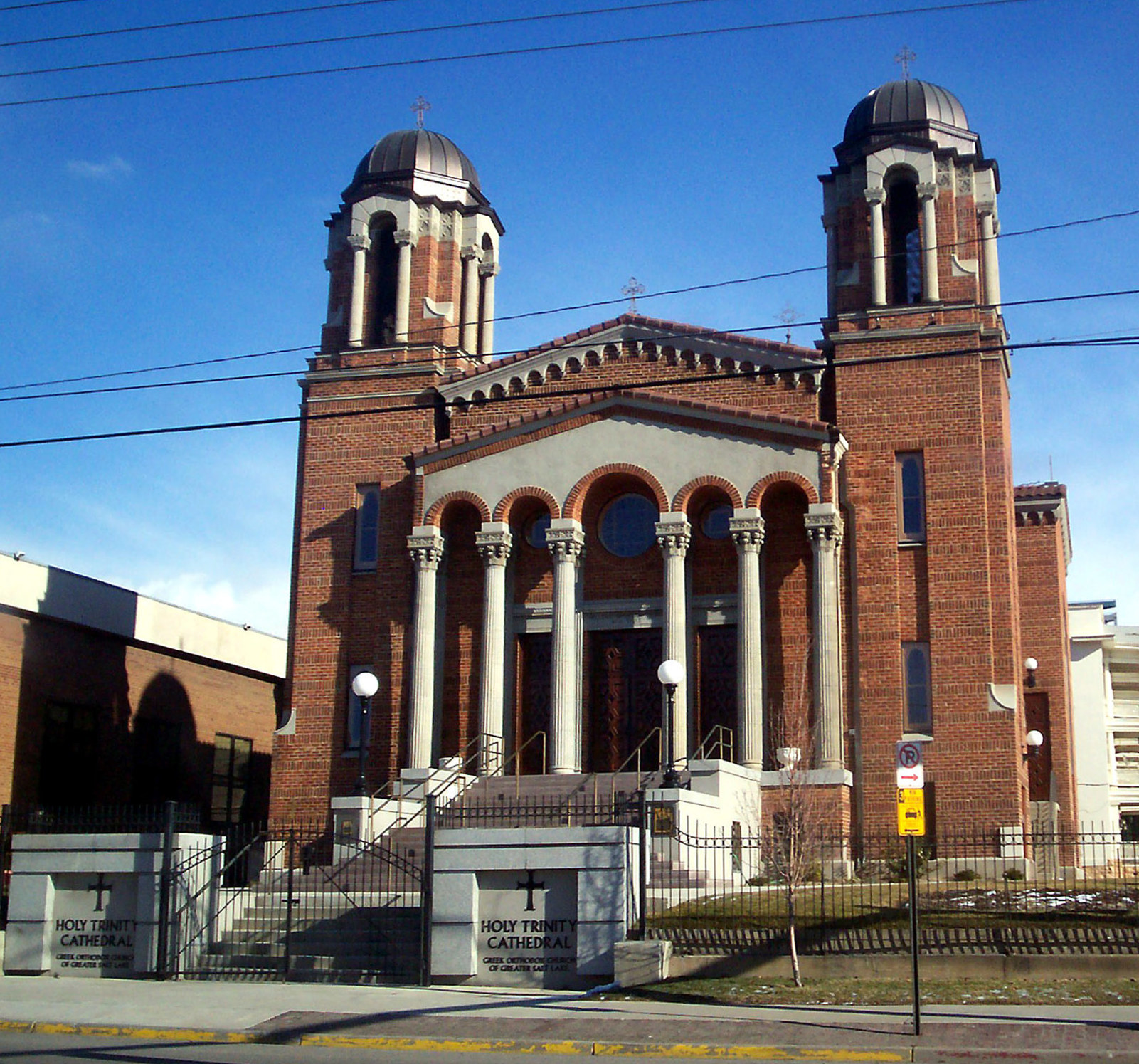
Holy Trinity Cathedral (Salt Lake City, Utah) (1923) *NRHP listed

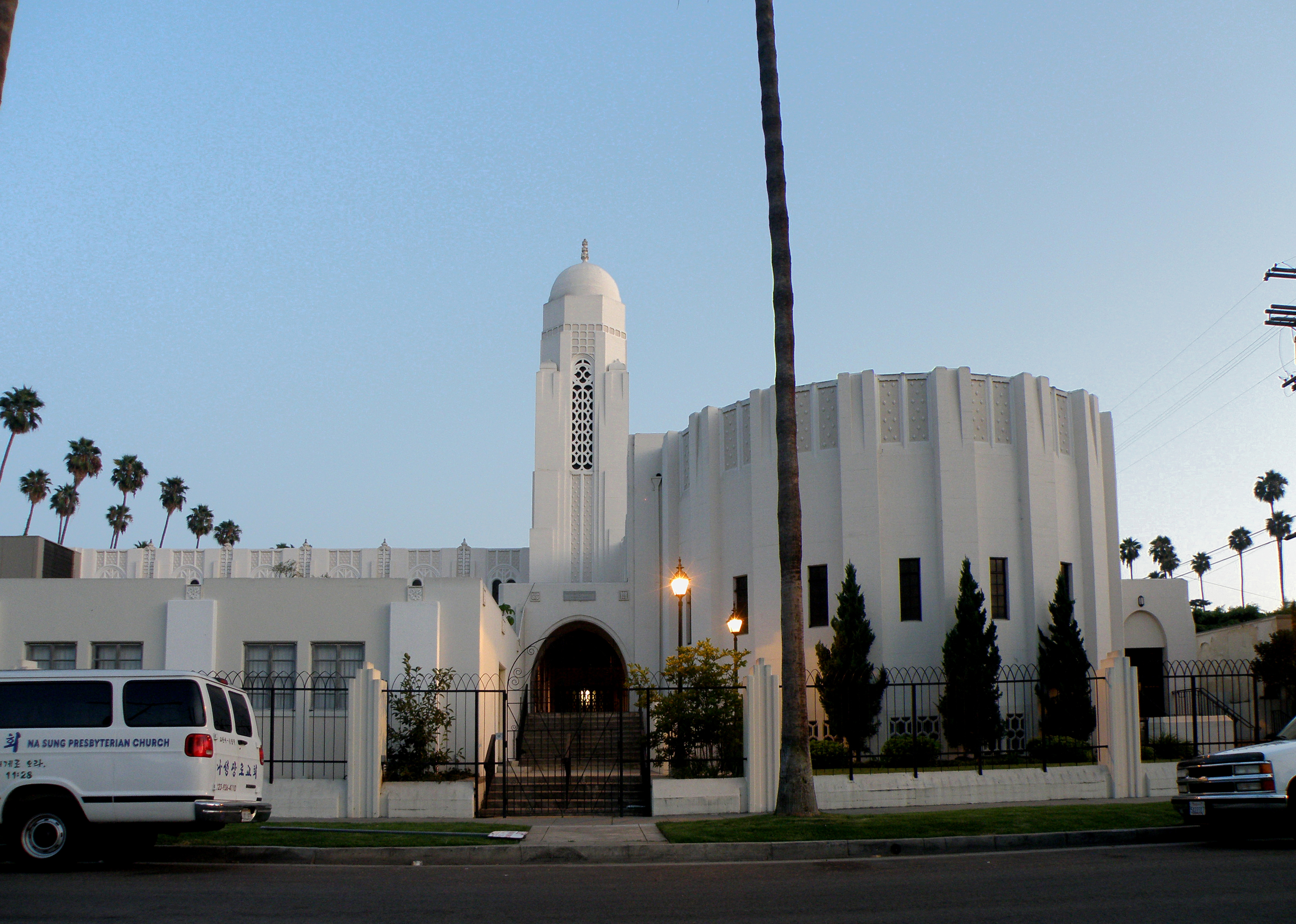
Wilshire Ward Chapel (1929) *LAHCM listed)

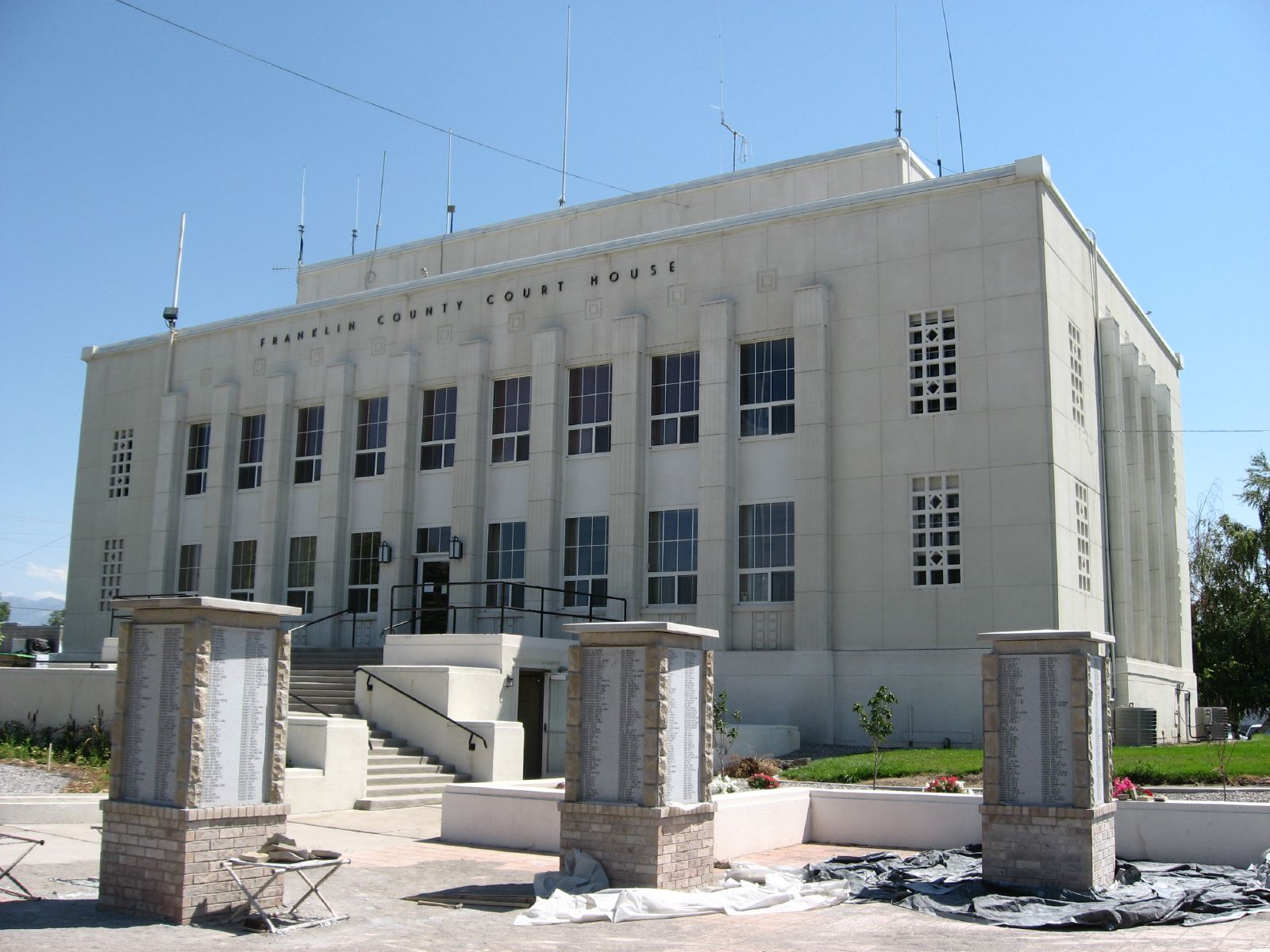
Franklin County Courthouse (Idaho) *NRHP listed

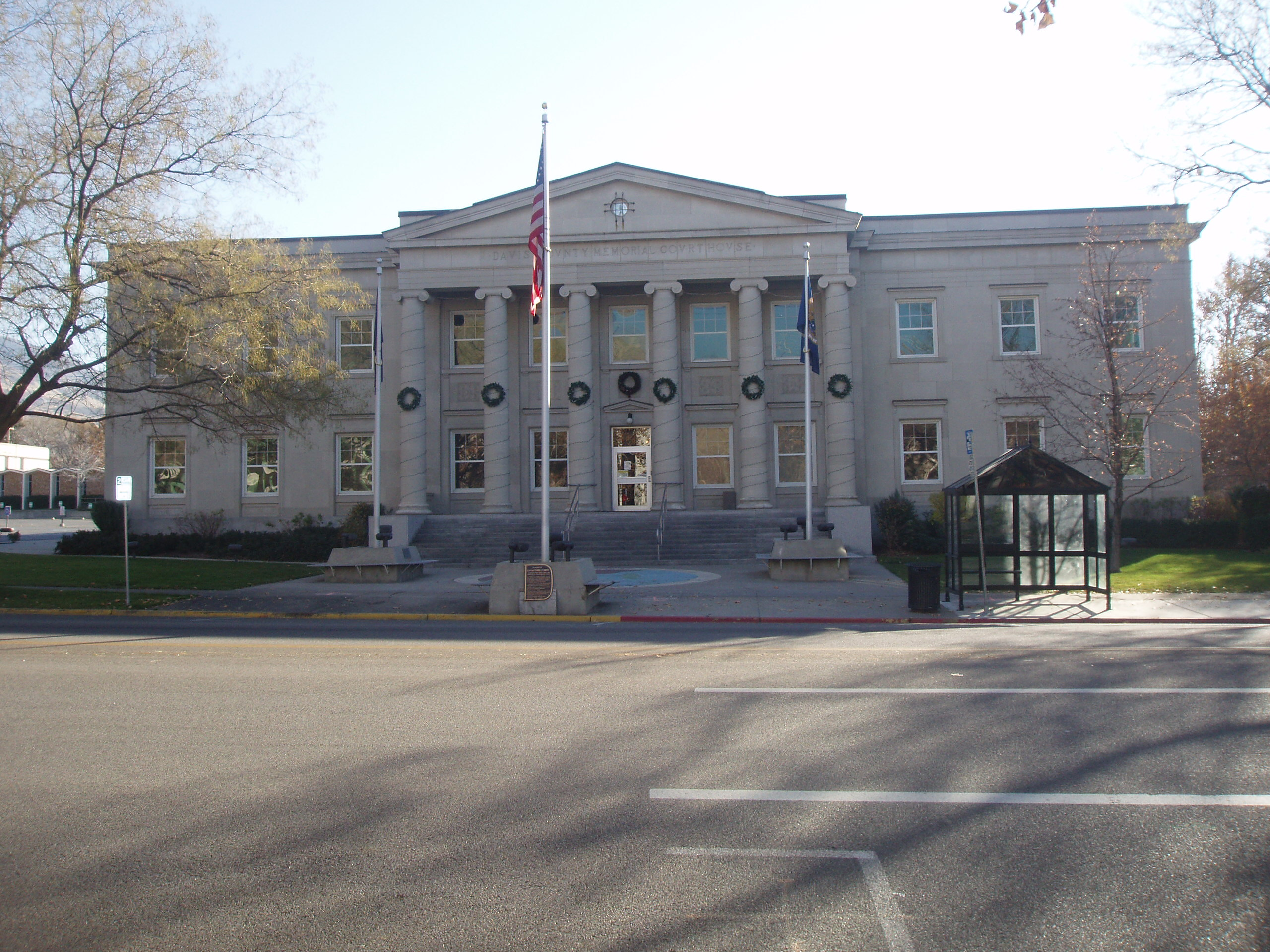
Davis County Courthouse (1929)

=== Other existing works ===
- Malcolm and Elizabeth Keyser House (1913), NRHP-listed
- Julia Budge Nibley House (1914)
- Walter Scott Weiler House (1914)
- St. Paul's Episcopal Church - Salt Lake City (1917)
- Brooklyn Chapel Meetinghouse (1917). Currently the Evening Star Baptist Church on Franklin and Gates
- Denver First Ward Meetinghouse (1918)
- Vernal Second Ward Chapel (1918)
- Centerville Ward Chapel (1918)
- Highland Park Ward Meetinghouse (1924). Designed by Burton & Pope. NRHP-listed in Highland Park Historic District (Salt Lake City, Utah)
- Ezra Thompson Building (1924). Also known as the former Salt Lake Tribune building)
  - Tribune Building (Salt Lake City, Utah) (1924), by Pope & Burton, NRHP-listed
- Memorial House Facade (1926), in Memory Grove (Salt Lake City)
- Provo First Ward Meetinghouse (1926)
- Phoenix Second Ward Meetinghouse, NRHP-listed in Roosevelt Historic District
- University Ward Chapel (1929), NRHP-listed in University Neighborhood Historic District (Salt Lake City, Utah)
- LeConte Stewart House, Kaysville, Utah, NRHP-listed
- Franklin County Courthouse, Preston, Idaho, NRHP-listed

=== Demolished works ===
- Emigration Ward Chapel (1910-)
- Liberty Stake 1st Ward Meetinghouse (1911–1976)
- Park Stake First Ward Meetinghouse (1913–1976), previously NRHP-listed
- Davis High School (Kaysville, Utah) - Original (1914)
- Nephi First and Second Ward Chapel (1915)
- Hyde Park Ward Chapel (1918)
