= Harold W. and Evelyn Burton House =

- U.S. National Register of Historic Places
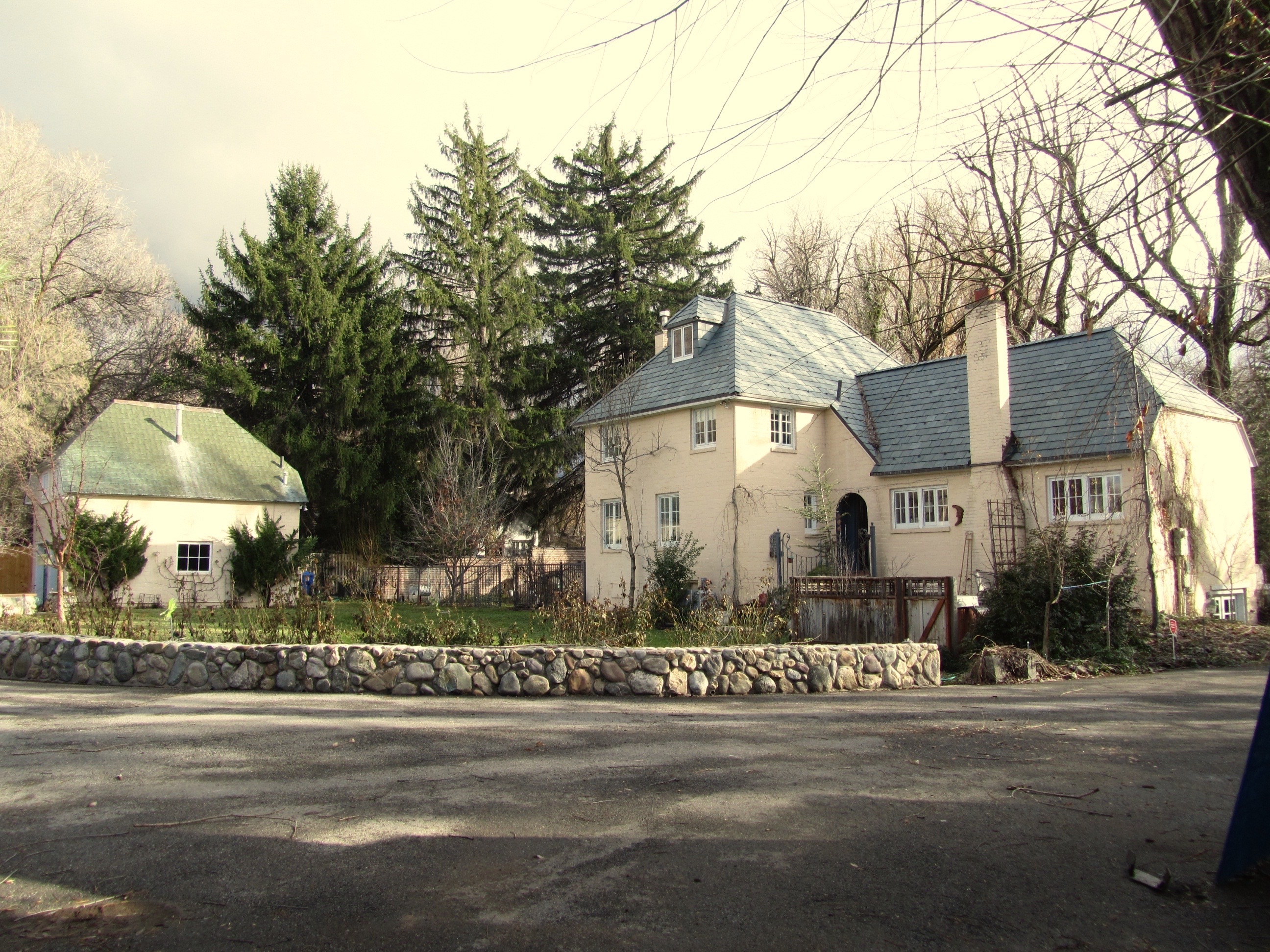
- Back elevation, with garage, facing northeast, February 2017

- Location within Utah Location within the United States
- Location: 2195 East Walker Lane; Holladay, Utah; United States
- Coordinates: 40°39′10″N 111°49′46″W
- Area: 1.61 acres (0.65 ha)
- NRHP reference No.: 100001440
- Added to NRHP: August 7, 2017

The Harold W. and Evelyn Burton House, at 2195 East Walker Lane in Holladay, Utah, United States, is a listed property on the National Register of Historic Places. A mansion built in 1923 as the home for architect Harold W. Burton, it was listed in 2017. Significant contributing property includes a 1923 two-car garage.
