= Wilshire Ward Chapel =

Los Angeles Historic-Cultural Monument

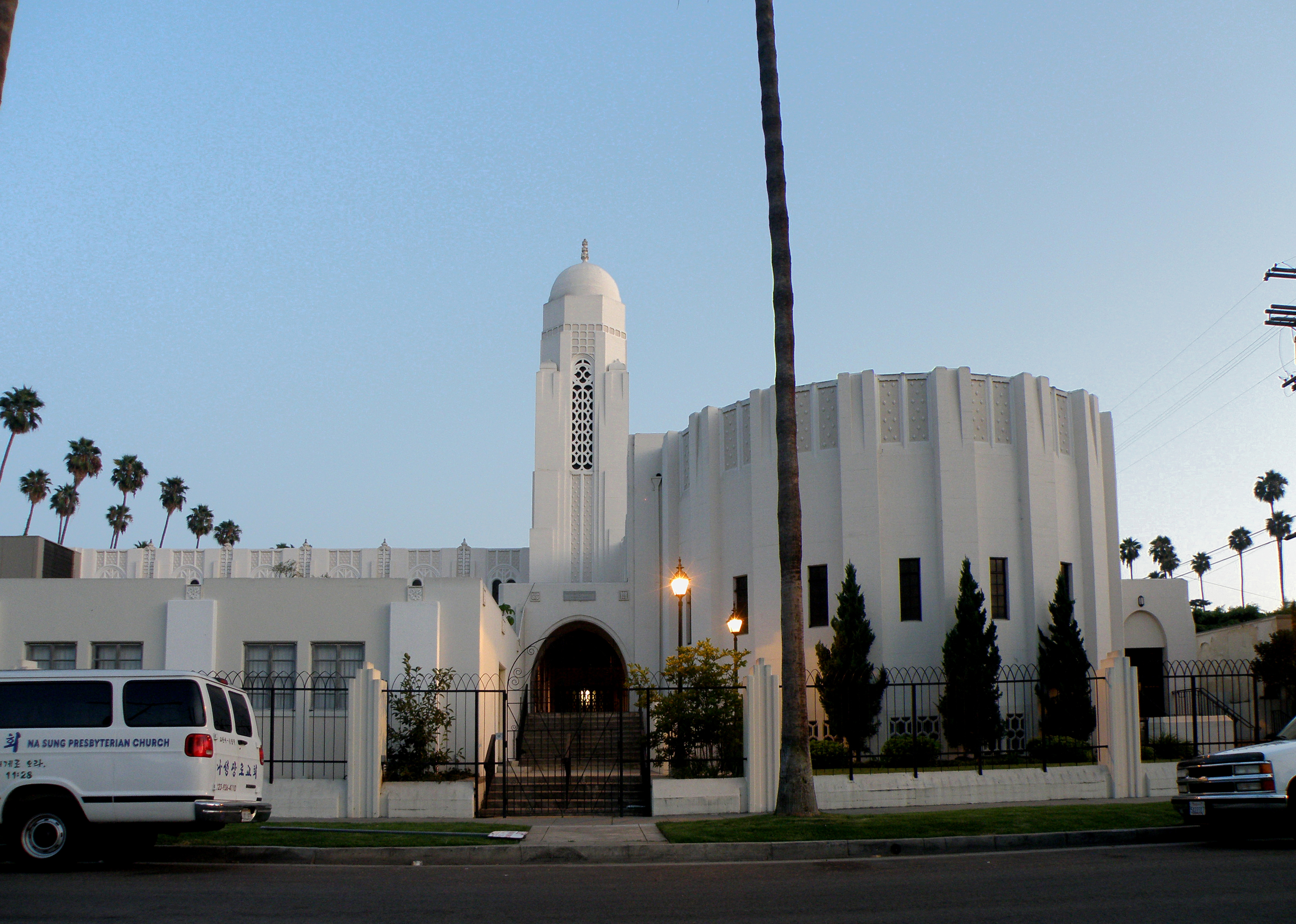
- Wilshire Ward Chapel

- Location within California
- 34°02′56″N 118°18′39″W

History
- Built: 1929

Site notes
- Architect(s): Hyrum Pope and Harold W. Burton
- Architectural styles: Art Deco, Moorish Revival
- Governing body: The Church of Jesus Christ of Latter-day Saints

Los Angeles Historic-Cultural Monument
- Designated: May 10, 1991
- Reference no.: 531

The Wilshire Ward Chapel, formerly known as the Hollywood Stake Tabernacle, is a meetinghouse of the Church of Jesus Christ of Latter-day Saints in Los Angeles, California. The building is listed as a Los Angeles Historic-Cultural Monument and on the Mormon Historic Sites Foundation registry.

It is located at 1209 S. Manhattan Place in the Angelus Vista neighborhood of Los Angeles.

== Construction ==
The Hollywood Stake Tabernacle was commissioned in late 1927 following the division of the Los Angeles Stake and designed by architects Hyrum Pope and Harold W. Burton in the Art Deco and early Modernist styles, with Moorish Revival elements. The cornerstone was laid in 1928 by then Stake President George W. McCune and the building was completed in 1929 at a cost of $250,000. The funds for the building were raised by church members in the area and one-to-one matching contributions by church headquarters. Many local church members provided volunteer labor on the building. The building seats approximately 2,100. Heber J. Grant, the President of The Church of Jesus Christ of Latter-day Saints at the time, dedicated the building and stated that it was "one of the very finest buildings that we have ever erected in any of the stakes of Zion...". Due to its construction and design, the tabernacle was considered the “finest cement building in America” by Architectural Concrete in 1933. The building was recommended for discontinuation of use in 1970, however local leaders fought to preserve the building. It went through major renovations that were completed in 2003 and the building was then rededicated by another church president Gordon B. Hinckley. The building remains in use as a meetinghouse by three Wards (Wilshire, Los Angeles Third (Spanish-speaking), Olympic (Korean-speaking)), but no longer functions as a LDS tabernacle.

== See also ==
- List of Los Angeles Historic-Cultural Monuments in the Wilshire and Westlake areas
