= Franklin County Courthouse (Idaho) =

- U.S. National Register of Historic Places
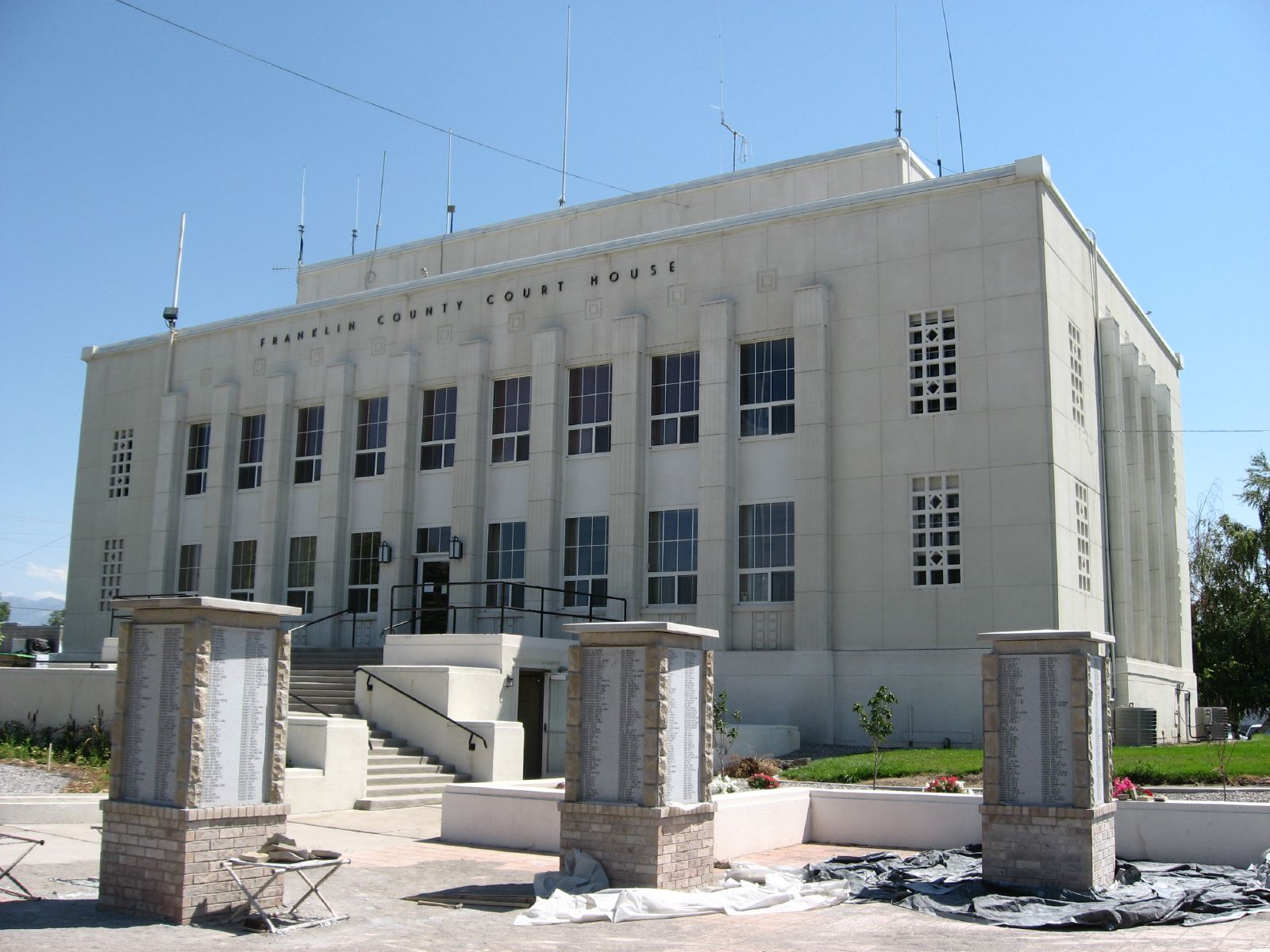

- Location within Idaho Location within the United States
- Interactive map showing the location for Franklin County Courthouse
- Location: 39 W. Oneida, Preston, Idaho
- Coordinates: 42°5′45″N 111°52′38″W
- Area: less than one acre
- Built: 1939
- Architect: Hyrum C. Pope; W.F. Thomas
- Architectural style: Art Deco
- MPS: County Courthouses in Idaho MPS
- NRHP reference No.: 87001585
- Added to NRHP: September 27, 1987

The Franklin County Courthouse, located at 39 W. Oneida St. in Preston in Franklin County, Idaho, was built in 1939. It was listed on the National Register of Historic Places in 1987.

It is Art Deco in style, principally designed by Salt Lake City architect Hyrum C. Pope. It is "tall, massive, and monumental" in its village setting.

Hyrum Pope died unexpectedly of a heart attack while inspecting the construction of the building; W.F. Thomas of Pope's firm, Pope & Burton, completed the supervision of the construction.
