= Tribune Building (Salt Lake City) =

Historic building in Salt Lake City, Utah, U.S.

- U.S. National Register of Historic Places
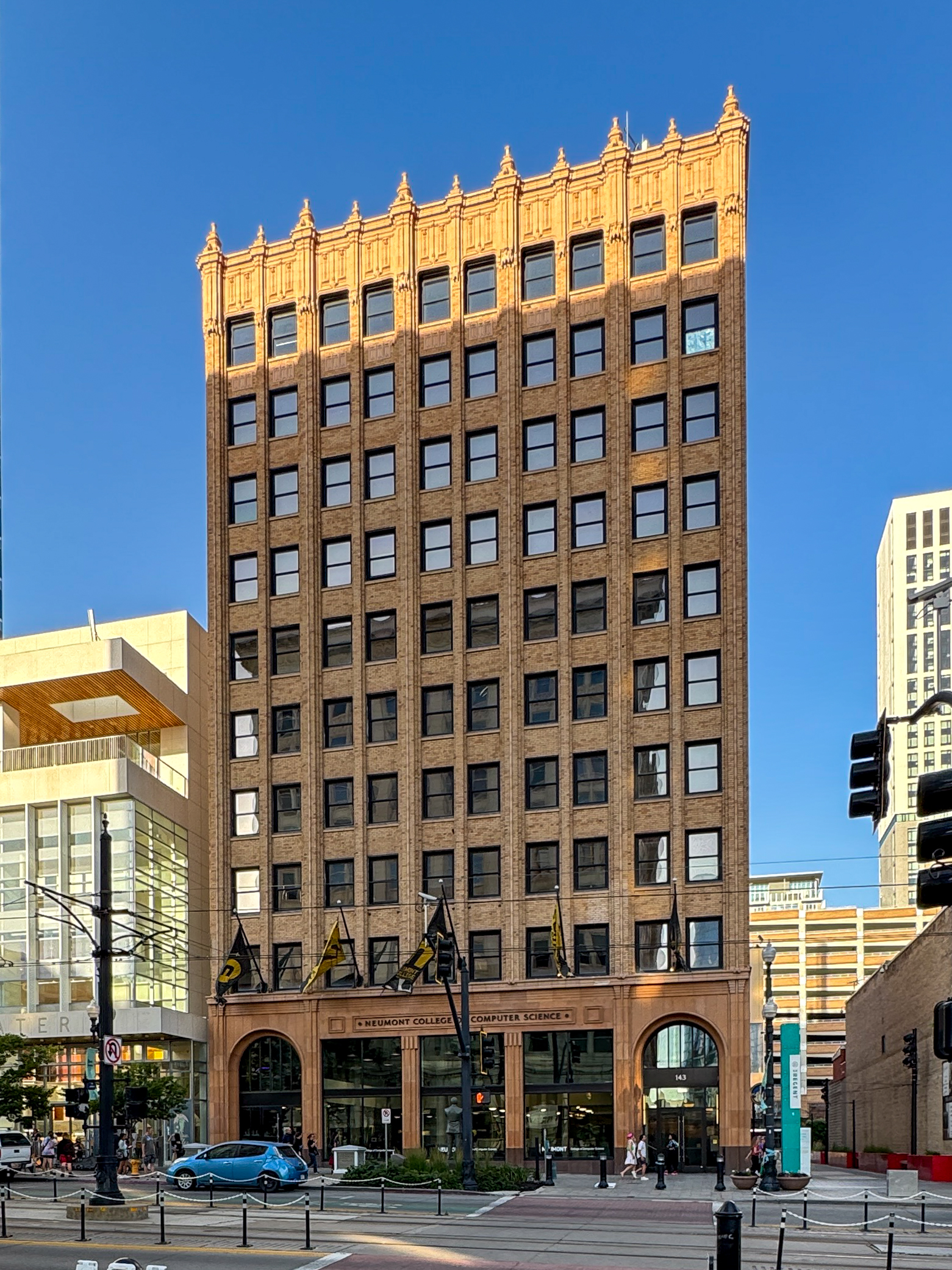
- Tribune Building in 2025

- Location within Utah Location within the United States
- Location: 137 South Main Street, Salt Lake City, Utah; United States
- Coordinates: 40°45′58″N 111°53′27″W
- Area: less than one acre
- Built: 1924
- Architect: Pope & Burton
- Architectural style: Late 19th and Early 20th Century American Movements, Modern Movement
- MPS: Salt Lake City Business District MRA
- NRHP reference No.: 82005108
- Added to NRHP: July 30, 2012

The Tribune Building is a historic commercial building in Salt Lake City, Utah, United States, that is listed on the National Register of Historic Places (NRHP).

== Description ==
It is located at 137 South Main Street and built in 1924. It was listed on the NRHP July 30, 2012.

It has also been known as the Ezra Thompson Building after three-time mayor Ezra Thompson, or as the former Salt Lake Tribune building, as the newspaper was a longtime occupant until 2005.

It was one of only four high-rise buildings constructed in Salt Lake City between World War I and the Great Depression.

The property was vacant in 2008 when it was purchased by investors, as part of a transaction reported to be for $3.9 million.

In 2013 it became home of Neumont University.

It was a work of architects Pope & Burton. (Note: NRIS listed the building's architects as "Hope & Burton", apparently a typo for Pope & Burton.) It is a two-part commercial block building. Although the lower level's facade has been modified, the building retains its notable terra cotta cornice.

== See also ==
- National Register of Historic Places listings in Salt Lake City
