= Highland Park, Salt Lake City =

Neighborhood and historic district in Salt Lake City, Utah, US

- Highland Park Historic District
- U.S. National Register of Historic Places
- U.S. Historic district
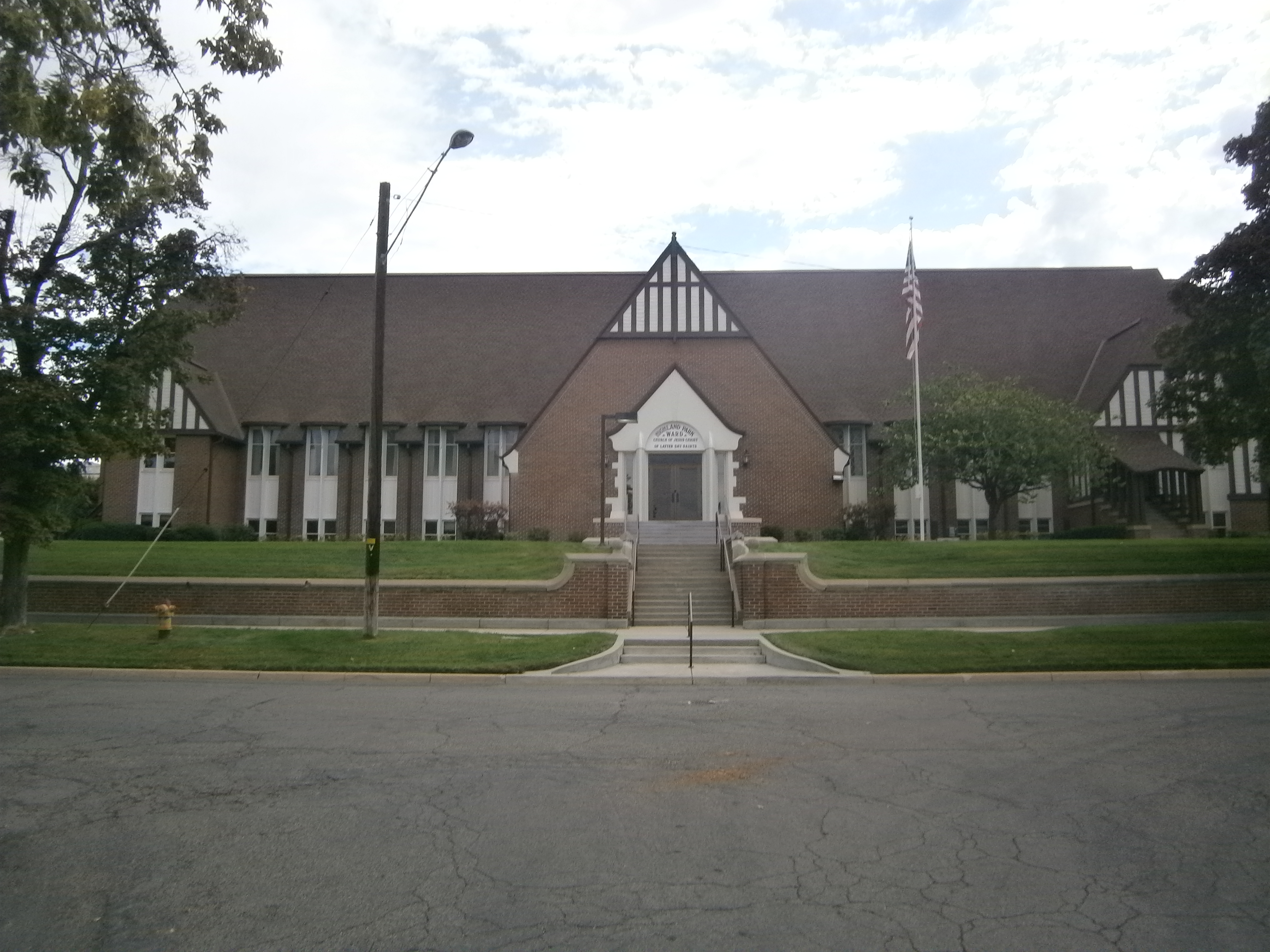
- Highland Park Ward Chapel in the historic district

- Location within Utah Location within the United States
- Location: Roughly bounded by Parkway Ave, 1500 East, 2700 South, and Elizabeth St., Salt Lake City, Utah
- Coordinates: 40°42′56″N 111°51′13″W
- Area: 300 acres (1.2 km^{2})
- Architect: Taylor Woolley, Pope & Burton, Dallas & Hedges, et al.
- Architectural style: Moderne, Late 19th and Early 20th Century American Movements, Colonial Revival
- NRHP reference No.: 98000405
- Added to NRHP: April 23, 1998

Highland Park is a neighborhood in Salt Lake City, just south of downtown Sugar House. The community originally was named for its lofty elevation. A large part of the neighborhood's core is recognized as the Highland Park Historic District. There is a small amount of retail along Highland Drive, but the area is otherwise residential. Forest Dale Golf Course forms the western boundary, Fairmont Park is to the northwest, and Sugar House Park and Highland High School are to the northeast separated from Highland Park by an underground reservoir and the 1300 East-Interstate 80 interchange.

== Historic district ==
The Highland Park Historic District is a 300 acres (1.2 km^{2}) area which included 468 contributing buildings when the district was listed on the NRHP in 1998. It includes work designed by Taylor Woolley, Pope & Burton, Dallas & Hedges, and others.

== Transportation ==
Highland Park is separated from downtown Sugar House by Interstate 80. Two major north-south roads, 1300 East and Highland Drive (previously Utah State Route 152), run close together through the middle of the neighborhood, dividing it into three pieces. Since 1300 East is very wide and runs through a purely residential area, it has frontage roads on the west side.

A primarily freight-carrying railroad branch line previously passed north-to-south along the western edge of the neighborhood (at about 1100 East), and a streetcar line also passed through on its way to Holladay. The Jordan and Salt Lake Canal, along which a multi-use trail is being developed, runs parallel to the railroad branch line's route. The north end of this multimodal transportation corridor is anchored by the historic Utah Light and Railroad (now Rocky Mountain Power) electric substation building right south of I-80.
