= Cache Valley =

US geographical feature

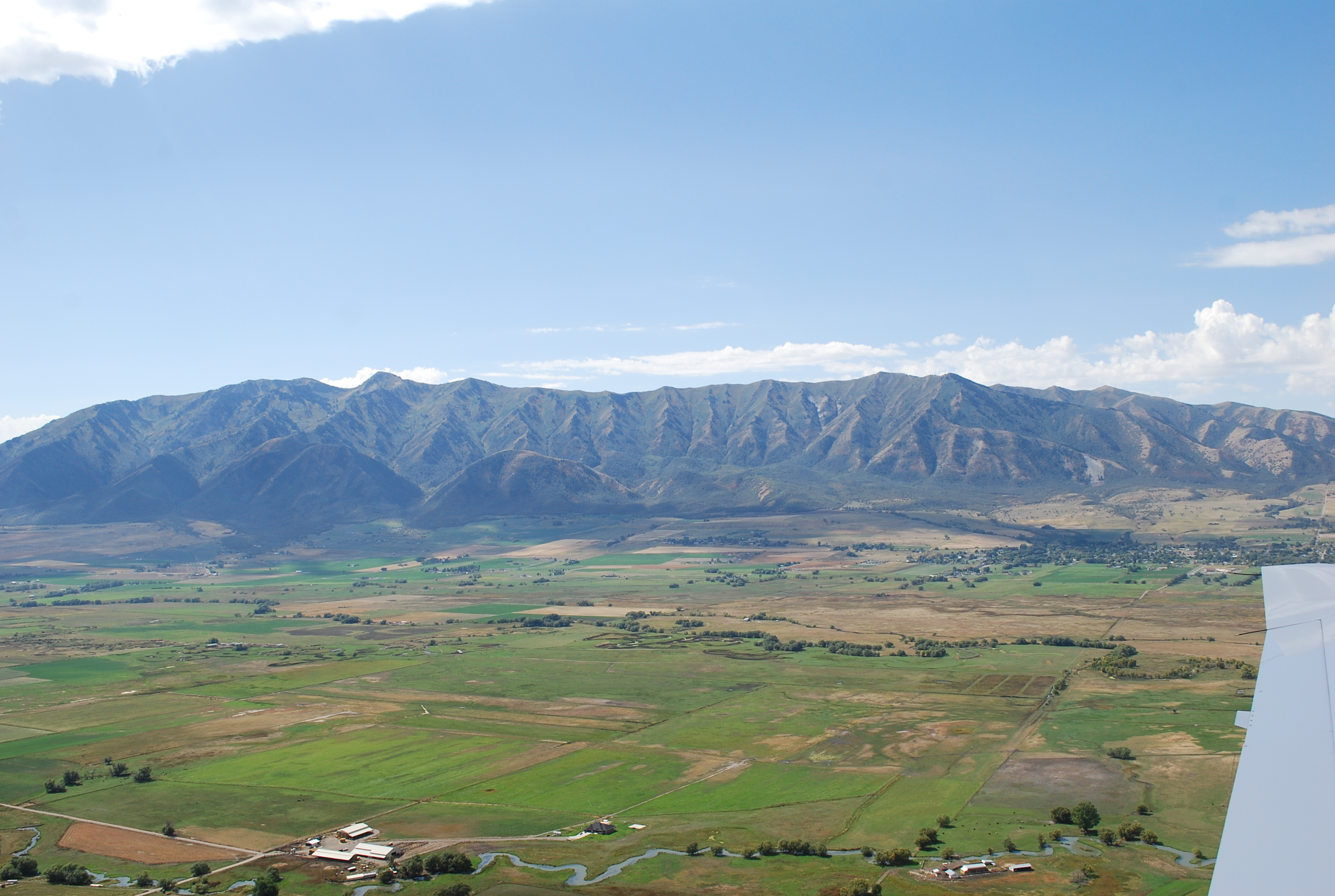
- Aerial view of the Wellsville Mountains at the southwestern end of the Cache Valley, September 2009
- Length: 50 mi (80 km)

Geography
- Country: United States
- States: Utah; Idaho
- Counties: Cache County, Utah; Franklin County, Idaho
- Population centers: Logan, Utah; Preston, Idaho
- Borders on: Bannock Range; Wellsville Mountains; Bear River Mountains; Wasatch Range
- Coordinates: 41.9°N 111.9°W
- Interactive map of Cache Valley

Cache Valley is a valley of northern Utah and southeast Idaho, United States, that includes the Logan metropolitan area. The valley was used by 19th century mountain men and was the site of the 1863 Bear River Massacre of 250 to 400 Shoshone people. (Note: Estimates of the total number of victims (children, women, and men) killed vary, with some stated figures including 250, 350, and 400.) The name, Cache Valley is often used synonymously to describe the Logan Metropolitan Area, one of the fastest growing metro areas in the US per capita — both in terms of economic GDP and population.

== History ==
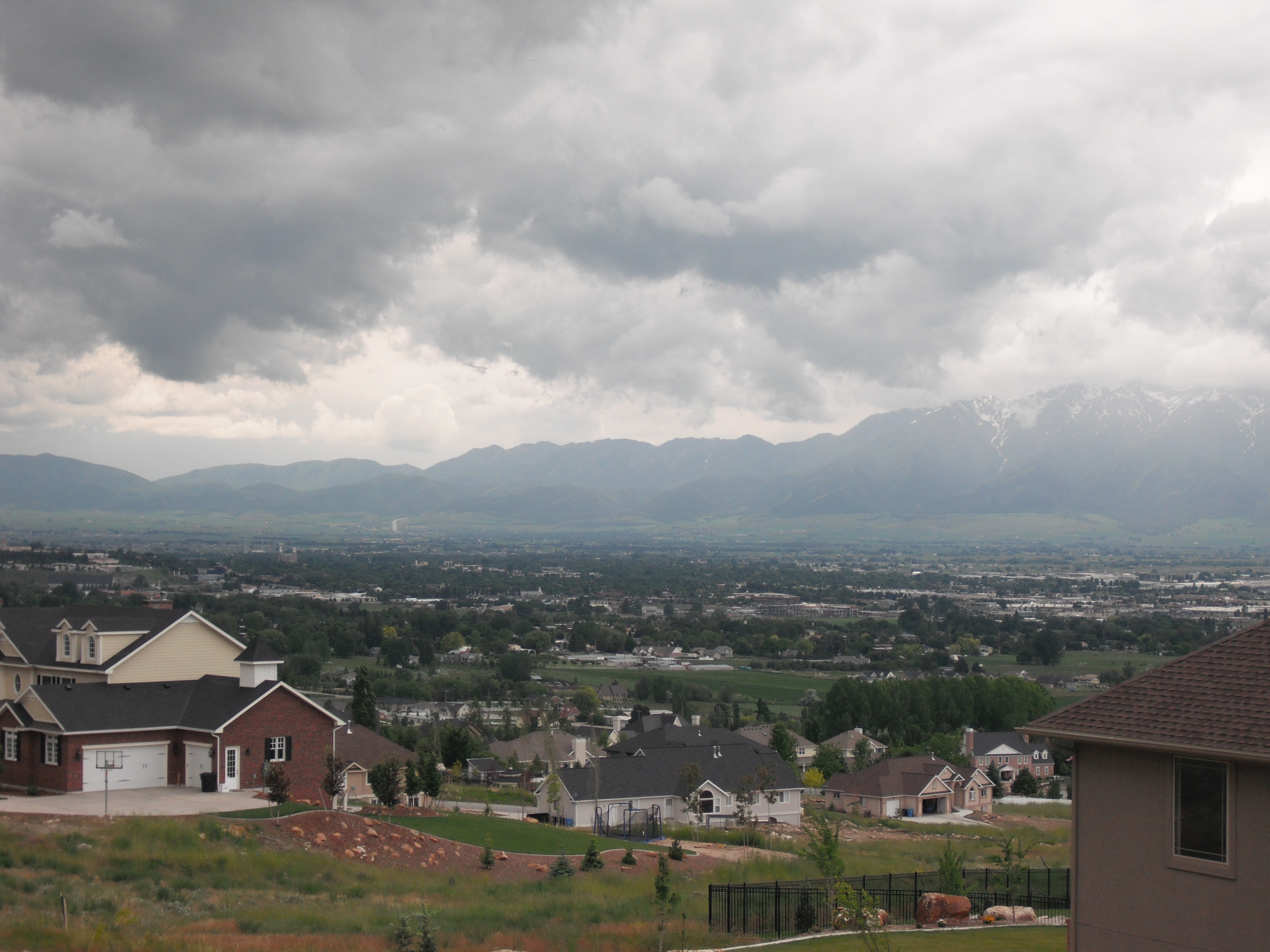
View across Cache Valley from North Logan, Utah, June 2009

Alongside habitation by the Shoshone and other indigenous peoples, European explorer Michel Bourdon discovered Cache Valley c.1818 during a MacKenzie fur expedition. The valley was subsequently used for the second of the annual gatherings of mountain men. Many of the trappers who worked in the valley came from the Hudson's Bay Company, the Northwest Fur Company, and the Rocky Mountain Fur Company. The name "Cache Valley" was derived by the fur trappers who hid their trading goods in caches in that region. The use of caches was a method used by fur traders to protect their goods from theft and damage.

Latter-day Saint William Gardner became the first Anglo-American permanent settler in 1852. Prior to the Mormon selection of the Salt Lake Valley, Jim Bridger had recommended Cache Valley due to its relative abundance of fresh water. A Mormon settler group led by Peter Maughan arrived via Box Elder Canyon and Wellsville Canyon (commonly referred to as Sardine Canyon) in July 1856 and additional settlers arrived on September 15.

Early Anglo-American settlers of Cache Valley took a defensive stance toward the indigenous Native Americans by creating the Cache Valley Militia. Men from the various towns in Cache Valley nicknamed "minute men" volunteered to drill, serve as watchmen, and to ride to the aid of other colonies at the news of attacks and skirmishes.

On January 29, 1863, an expedition from Camp Douglas, Utah to Cache Valley, the United States Army at the request of Cache Valley settlers attacked a Northern Shoshone village in the early morning at the confluence of the Bear River and Beaver Creek (now Battle Creek) in what became known as the Bear River Massacre. The number of victims was an estimated 250 to 400 children, women, and men, and some sources describe it as the largest mass murder of Native Americans by the US military, and largest single episode of genocide in US history.

== Communities ==
Cache County Communities:

- Amalga
- Avon
- Benson
- Cache Junction
- Clarkston
- College Ward
- Cornish
- Cove
- Hyde Park
- Hyrum
- Lewiston
- Logan
- Mendon
- Millville
- Mt. Sterling
- Newton
- Nibley
- North Logan
- Paradise
- Petersboro
- Providence
- Richmond
- River Heights
- Smithfield
- Trenton
- Wellsville
- Young Ward

Franklin County Communities:

- Banida
- Clifton
- Cub River
- Dayton
- Egypt
- Fairview
- Franklin
- Glendale
- Mapleton
- Oxford
- Preston
- Riverdale
- Thatcher
- Treasureton
- Weston
- Whitney

== Transportation ==
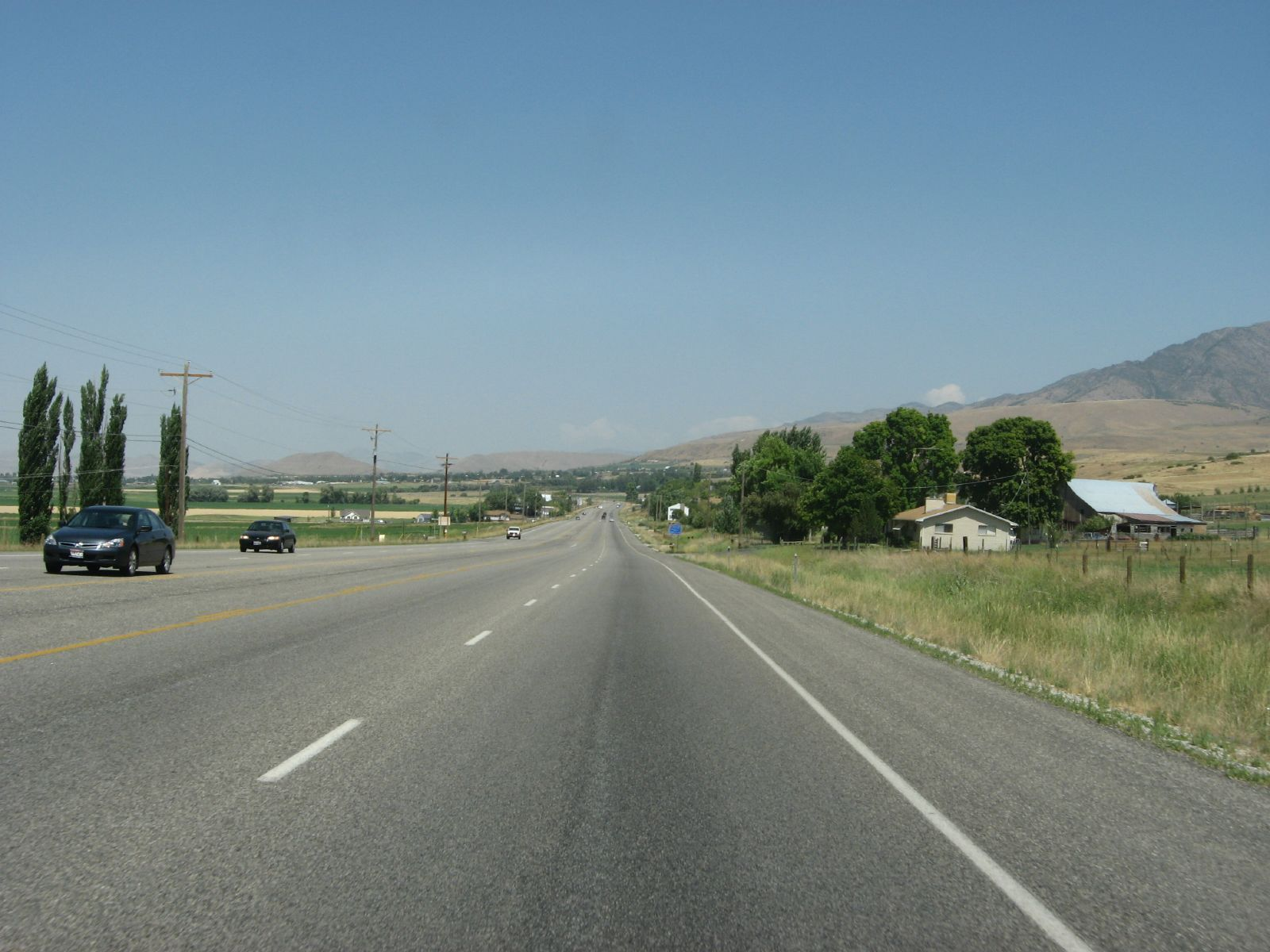
Looking north on US-91 toward Richmond, Utah

U.S. Highways 89 and 91 enter the valley from the southwest as one highway, and then separate in downtown Logan. US-89 goes northeast into Logan Canyon, and thence to Bear Lake, a large lake in the area. US-91 goes due northward into Idaho and to reconnect with I-15. Several state highways run through the valley: In Idaho, State Highways 34 and 36; and in Utah, SR-23, SR-30, SR-101, SR-142, SR-165, SR-200, and SR-218.

The valley is served by the Cache Valley Transit District (CVTD), a zero-fare bus system. CVTD primarily serves the Logan area however offers shuttle service to Preston.

There are two airports in the valley, the Logan-Cache Airport and Preston Airport. Neither airport provides commercial service, however Salt Lake City International Airport is within driving distance (less than 2 hours).

== See also ==
- List of valleys of Utah
