= Utah State Route 23 =

State highway in Utah, United States

State Route 23
- SR-23 highlighted in red

Route information
- Maintained by UDOT
- Length: 29.890 mi (48.103 km)
- Existed: 1953–present

Major junctions
- South end: US 89 / US 91 in Wellsville
- SR-30 near Mendon; SR-142 in Newton
- North end: CR D1 at the Idaho state line near Cornish

Location
- Country: United States
- State: Utah

Highway system
- Utah State Highway System; Interstate; US; State; Minor; Scenic
← SR-22	→ SR-24

State Route 23 (SR-23) is a state highway in northern Utah, running for 29.890 miles (48.103 km) in Cache County from Wellsville to the Idaho state line on the north end of Cornish.

== Route description ==
SR-23 begins in Wellsville at an intersection with US-89/US-91 in southern Wellsville and heads north through the town. It turns northwest parallel to the Wellsville Mountains to Mendon. It turns north through Mendon and Petersboro. It turns northwest between Cache Butte and the Cutler Reservoir into Cache Junction.

SR-23 then turns north through Cache Junction across the Bear River into Newton. It turns east through the center of Newton, then turns north around Little Mountain through Trenton, Morton, and Cornish to the state line. It continues as County Road D1 in Franklin County, Idaho.

== History ==
The state legislature created SR-142 in 1933, connecting SR-69 (now SR-30) at Petersboro with Newton and Smithfield. SR-142 was moved to the present route to Clarkston in 1941, with the old alignment through downtown Newton to Smithfield becoming SR-218. State Route 164 was also defined in 1933, running south from Petersboro to US-91 in Wellsville. Two years later, State Route 192 was created, running north from SR-142 (now SR-218) east of Newton to SR-61 in Cornish. That part of SR-61 had been added in 1931, heading both east to Cove and north to Idaho. In 1953, SR-164 and SR-192 were combined with SR-142 south of Newton, SR-218 through Newton, and SR-61 north of Cornish to create State Route 23.

== Major intersections ==
The entire route is in Cache County.

Location	mi	km	Destinations	Notes
Wellsville	0.000	0.000	US 89 / US 91 – Brigham City, Logan	Southern terminus
Wellsville	1.564	2.517	SR-101 (Main Street)	
Petersboro	10.066	16.200	SR-30 – Riverside, Logan	
Newton	18.087	29.108	SR-142 east (Main Street) – Clarkston	
Newton	19.225	30.940	SR-218 east – Smithfield	
Trenton	24.293	39.096	SR-142 – Richmond	
Cornish	28.290	45.528	SR-61 east – Lewiston	
Cornish	29.890	48.103	CR D1 north – Weston	Northern terminus Idaho state line
1.000 mi = 1.609 km; 1.000 km = 0.621 mi
