= Utah State Route 61 =

Highway in Utah, United States

State Route 61

Route information
- Maintained by UDOT
- Length: 7.287 mi (11.727 km)
- Existed: 1931–present

Major junctions
- West end: SR-23 in Cornish
- SR-200 near Lewiston
- East end: US 91 near Richmond

Location
- Country: United States
- State: Utah
- Counties: Cache

Highway system
- Utah State Highway System; Interstate; US; State; Minor; Scenic
← SR-60	→ SR-62

State Route 61 (SR-61) is a nearly 7.3-mile-long (11.7 km) state highway in Cache County, Utah, connecting SR-23 in Cornish, to U.S. Route 91 (US-91) in Cove via Lewiston, in the extreme northern part of the state. The highway has existed since at least 1914 and as SR-61 since at least 1937. Between 735 and 2,180 vehicles travel along the highway on an average day in 2012.

== Route description ==
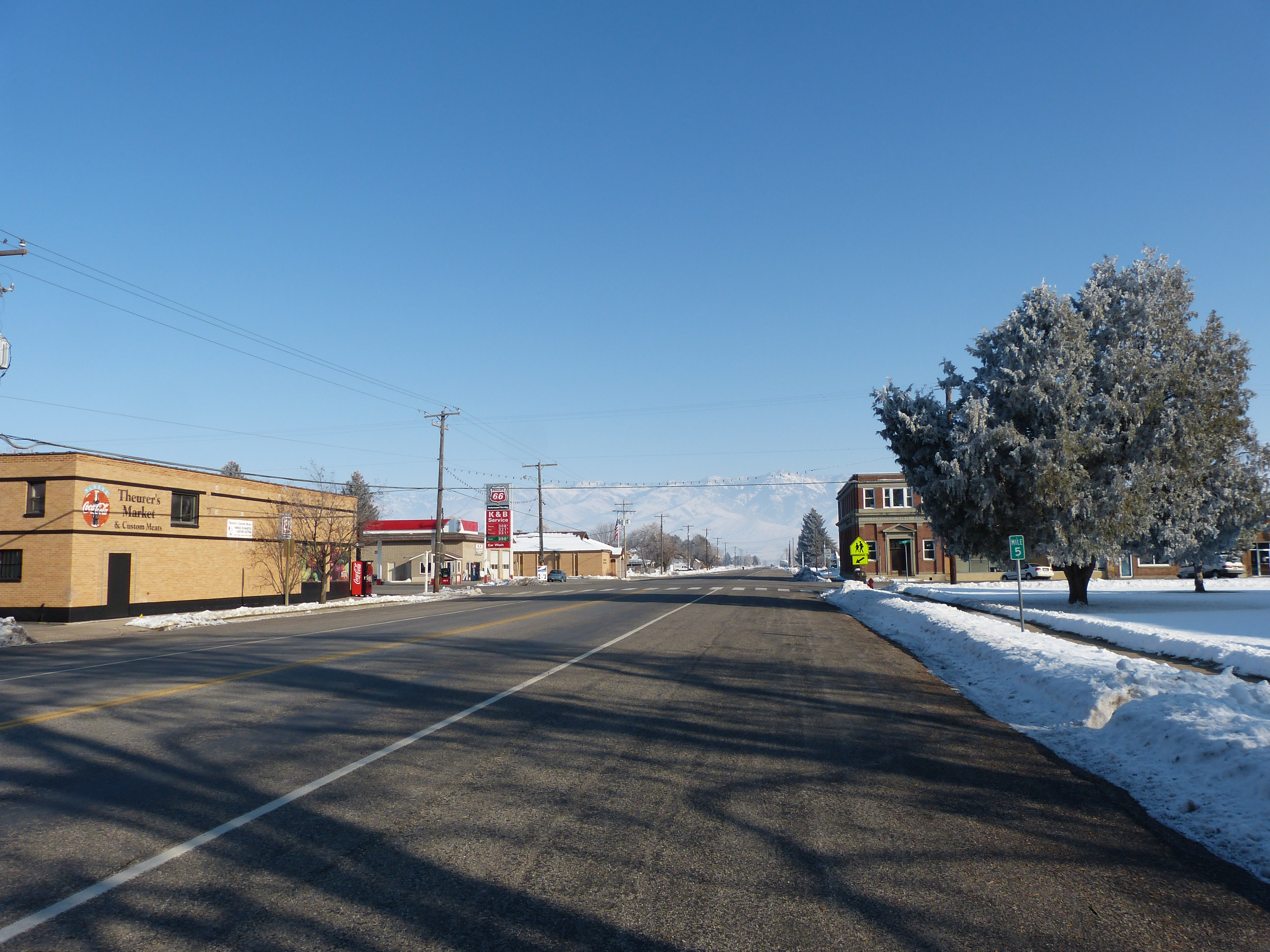
SR-61 in Lewiston

At the intersection of SR-23 (4800 West) and 13400 North in the center of Cornish, SR-61 departs east on 13400 North due east, crossing over a single track belonging to the Union Pacific Railroad (UP). Exiting Cornish, the highway crosses the Bear River and continues east through rural Cache County. Just shy of the western city limits of Lewiston, the highway intersects SR-200 (800 West), a connector road to Preston, Idaho. From the western terminus to SR-200, the shoulder is up to four feet (1.2 m) wide, suitable for bicycling, however the remainder of the route has much narrower shoulders, between less than or equal to one and nine-tenths feet (0.58 m) wide.

The highway's name changes from 13400 South to Center Street through Lewiston. Passing the Lewiston Cemetery, SR-61 crosses over the Cub River and a second single track belonging to UP, and then a third UP single track just before the highway's eastern terminus at US-91 north of Richmond. All of the rail lines that SR-61 crosses originally belonged to the Oregon Short Line Railway. Aside from the segment through Lewiston, the highway is surrounded by farmland for its entire journey across northern Utah.

Every year, UDOT conducts a series of surveys on its highways in the state to measure traffic volume. This is expressed in terms of average annual daily traffic (AADT), a measure of traffic volume for any average day of the year. In 2012, UDOT calculated that as few as 735 vehicles used the highway on an average day at its western terminus in Cornish, and as many as 2,180 vehicles used the highway at its junction with SR-200. Thirty-five percent of this was truck traffic.

== History ==
A roadway linking Cornish to the east has existed since at least 1914. The roadway that serves as the eastern terminus was numbered SR-1 by 1927, and the highway officially was designated SR-61 in 1931. The 53-foot-long (16.2 m) bridge that carries SR-61 over the Cub River today was constructed in 1952, while the 182-foot-long (55.5 m) bridge over the Bear River was built in 1961. The original river crossings were slightly further south than their current locations. Until 1953, SR-61 continued north to the Idaho border. This section was replaced by SR-23 in 1953.

== Major intersections ==
The entire route is in Cache County.

Location	mi	km	Destinations	Notes
Cornish	0.000	0.000	SR-23 (4800 West) – Ogden, Pocatello	Western terminus
Lewiston	4.025	6.478	SR-200 north (800 West) – Preston	Southern terminus of SR-200
Lewiston	7.287	11.727	US 91 (950 East) – Logan, Franklin	Eastern terminus
1.000 mi = 1.609 km; 1.000 km = 0.621 mi

== See also ==
- List of state highways in Utah
