= U.S. Route 91 =

Numbered Highway in Utah and Idaho in the United States

U.S. Route 91
- US-91 highlighted in red

Route information
- Maintained by UDOT and ITD
- Length: 172.663 mi (Note: Sum of Utah and Idaho mileage logs in the Major intersections section of this article) (277.874 km)
- Existed: 1926–present

Major junctions
- South end: I-15 / I-84 in Brigham City, UT
- US 89 in Logan, UT; US 30 in McCammon, ID; I-86 in Pocatello, ID
- North end: I-15 BL / US 26 in Idaho Falls, ID

Location
- Country: United States
- States: Utah, Idaho
- Counties: UT: Box Elder, Cache; ID: Franklin, Bannock, Bingham, Bonneville

Highway system
- United States Numbered Highway System; List; Special; Divided
← US 90	→ US 92

U.S. Route 91 or U.S. Highway 91 (US 91) is a 172.7-mile-long (277.9 km) north–south United States highway running from Brigham City, Utah, to Idaho Falls, Idaho, in the U.S. states of Idaho and Utah. Despite the "1" as the last digit in the number, US 91 is no longer a cross-country artery, as it has mostly been replaced by Interstate 15. The highway currently serves to connect the communities of the Cache Valley to I-15 and beyond. Prior to the mid-1970s, US 91 was an international commerce route from Long Beach, California, to the Canada–US border north of Sweetgrass, Montana. US 91 was routed on the main streets of most of the communities it served, including Las Vegas Boulevard in Las Vegas and State Street in Salt Lake City. From Los Angeles to Salt Lake, the route was built along the corridor of the Arrowhead Trail. A portion of the highway's former route in California is currently State Route 91.

== Route description ==
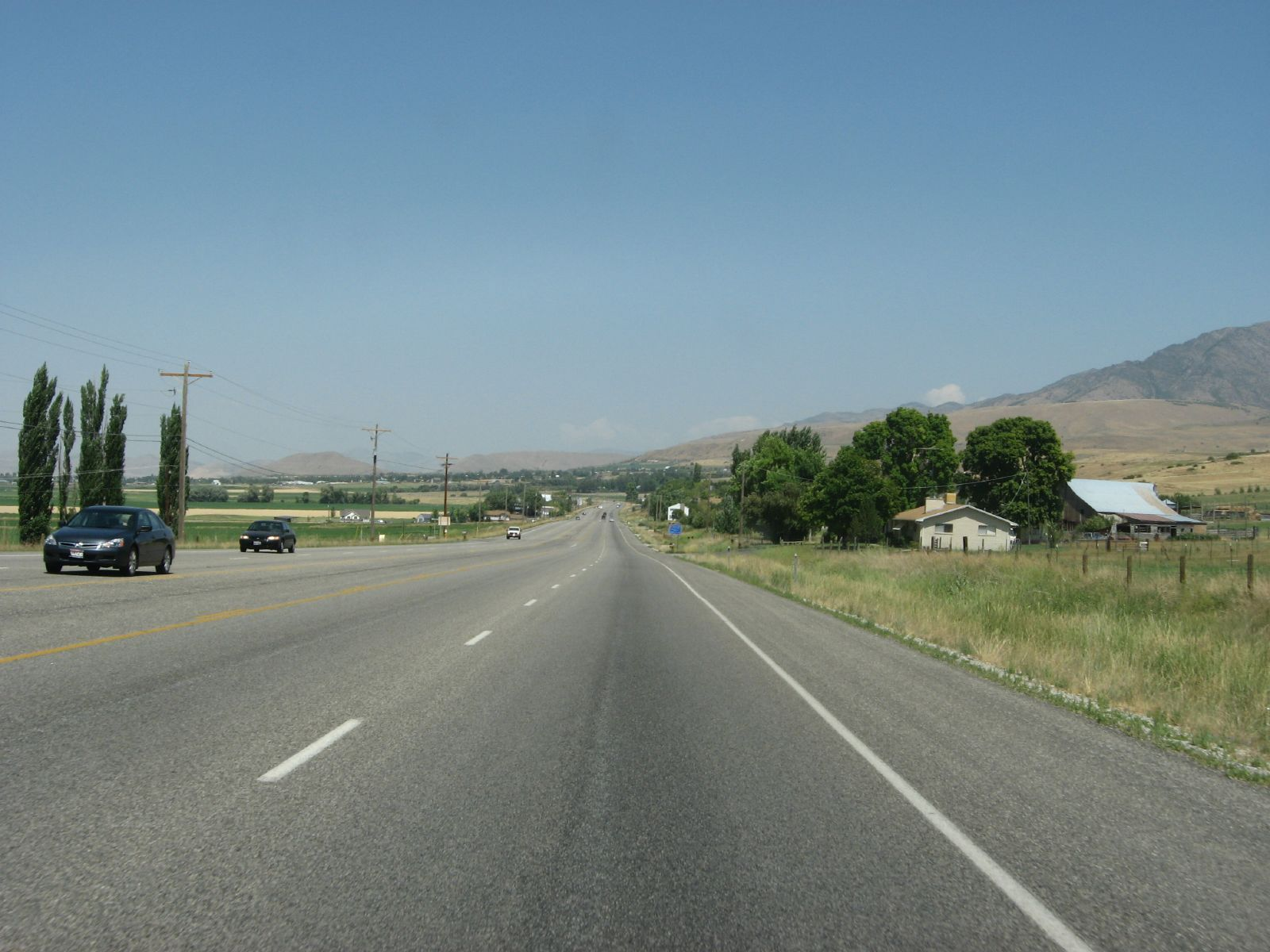
US 91 in Cache Valley

Utah

US 91 begins at Brigham City. The highway was originally routed through Brigham City, but today runs on a southern bypass (locally designated 1100 South). The original routing is now State Route 90. In Brigham City, US 89 becomes concurrent with US 91.

After leaving Brigham City, the highway begins to climb the Wellsville Mountains. The entire grade across these mountains is colloquially called "Sardine Canyon". However, Sardine Canyon is the canyon originally used by the first settlers to mark a trail to Cache Valley, so named as they used the litter from their lunch of canned sardines to mark the trail. A new route was constructed in the 1950s that uses the same mountain pass, Sardine Summit, as the old road, however follows different canyons down from the summit. Despite the modern route of US 91 no longer using Sardine Canyon, the name continues to be used by locals and news media alike in describing the traffic, weather conditions or scenery along the entire grade across the Wellsville Mountains.

US 91 enters the Wellsville Mountains via Box Elder Canyon in a climb to the lake and town of Mantua, which has a reputation as a speed trap. After passing the reservoir, the highway resumes climbing, using Dry Canyon to reach Sardine Summit. The highway descends through Wellsville Canyon and reaches the Cache Valley, where it serves as the major thoroughfare. Logan is the largest city in the valley. At Logan, US 89 splits off to the east towards Bear Lake, while US 91 continues north through the valley to the Idaho state line. Both the Utah and Idaho portions of Cache Valley are part of the Logan metropolitan area.

The Utah section of US 91 is defined at Utah Code Annotated § 72-4-115(1). In addition, the segment south of the SR-142 intersection in Richmond is included in the National Highway System.

Idaho

US 91 continues serving the Idaho portion of the Cache Valley with Preston as the largest city. The highway passes by the Bear River Massacre Site, a National Historic Landmark, near Preston, and over the geologically significant Red Rock Pass, near Downey.

After leaving Cache Valley, the highway then crosses back to rejoin Interstate 15. At Pocatello, US 91, US 30, and I-15 Business Loop separate from Interstate 15 and run concurrently, passing through a small portion of the Idaho State University campus. US 30 separates from US 91 near Pocatello's city hall at what was once the starting point of one of Idaho's first designated highways, the Yellowstone Park Highway. From this point the highway generally follows the original route of the Yellowstone Park Highway northeastward, until it reaches its terminus at its intersection with US 26, south of Idaho Falls.

== History ==
At its peak, from 1947 to 1965, U.S. Route 91 extended from the Pacific Ocean at Long Beach, California, to Coutts, Alberta. Though a good portion of the highway fit the US highway numbering grid, overall, US 91's northern terminus was east of US 89, while its southern terminus was west of US 101. North of Riverside, California, US 91 followed a route that would be largely paralleled by modern I-15 and I-215 where these routes did not completely supplant it. There are some parts where US 91/I-15 had divergent paths. The more southerly is from Littlefield, Arizona, to St. George, Utah, where the two routes took different paths through the Arizona Strip. The more northerly and longer is the surviving portion of US 91 from Brigham City to Downey, where Interstate 15 follows an old route of U.S. Route 191.

Utah first submitted a petition to AASHTO to have the US 91 designation truncated in 1971. This petition was approved on June 21, 1971. However, the state did not take action until 1974. Utah officials co-ordinated a second petition with the transportation departments of California, Nevada and Arizona. In this unified petition officials in Utah proposed the number changeover take place in 1974. Nevada requested postponing the deletion of US 91 as Nevada expected to complete the last piece of I-15 in 1975. Nevada officials suggested U.S. Route 40 be similarly truncated, as this highway largely duplicated Interstate 80 in the same states. Despite Nevada's request, the petition was submitted and approved in 1974.

Retracing the path of historic U.S. Route 91 is possible but difficult. In most cities the route of US 91 is still in use as a local street or highway. In many rural areas, I-15 was built on top of the former US 91.

The highway passed through the following states:

- California (until 1974)
- Nevada (until 1974)
- Arizona (10 miles (16 km) in the Arizona Strip, until 1974)
- Utah
- Idaho
- Montana (until 1980)

=== California ===
US 91's original southern terminus was at the intersection of Atlantic Avenue (historically SR 15) and East Pacific Coast Highway (SR 1) in Long Beach. This intersection also marked the historic western terminus of US 6, which proceeded west from that intersection. East of the intersection, US 91 proceeded east along East Pacific Coast Highway to Los Alamitos Circle.

US 91 shield used in California

The portions in California were replaced with:

- SR 1 (Pacific Coast Highway from Atlantic Avenue to Los Alamitos Circle)
- SR 19 (Lakewood Boulevard from Los Alamitos Circle to Lincoln Avenue)
- SR 214 (route no longer a state highway – Carson Street and Lincoln Avenue)
- SR 91
- I-215
- I-15

=== Nevada ===
The route of US 91 in Nevada was replaced with I-15 in 1974.

South of Las Vegas, most of the old route is still intact, as it runs parallel and to the east of the freeway from Jean to Sloan. Visitors to the popular Seven Magic Mountains art installation must travel at least a dozen miles on the old route to reach the site.

In Las Vegas, US 91 was better known as Las Vegas Boulevard (State Route 604 after the 1976 renumbering of most Nevada state highways). The intersection of Las Vegas Boulevard and Fremont Street is the historic intersection with U.S. 93 and U.S. 95. Here, U.S. 466 parted ways with US 91 and headed southeast on Fremont Street with southbound US 93 and US 95. At this intersection, US 93 and 95 departed Fremont Street and turned northeast onto Las Vegas Boulevard, heading northbound with US 91. A few blocks further up, at Bonanza Road, US 95 turned west until it hit Rancho Drive, then continued north. US 91/93 stayed aligned with Las Vegas Boulevard, which turned into Salt Lake Highway after departing the city of North Las Vegas.

Until its decertification in 1974, US 91 followed I-15 to exit 112, where it took present-day NV 170 through Riverside to Mesquite, turned right onto NV 144 (Mesquite Boulevard and Sandhill Boulevard), and then followed Hillside Drive into Arizona (where the road became Fairview Avenue).

=== Arizona ===
Directional colored shields found on US 91 in Arizona during the 1950s

US 91 entered Arizona from Nevada on Fairview Avenue and followed it northeast to Littlefield. Once Fairview Avenue crosses I-15, it became Cane Beds Road through downtown Beaver Dam and into Utah, where the road continued as Old Highway 91. Today, this section of US 91 is known as Mohave County Road 91.

=== Utah ===
From the State Line to Saint George US 91 followed a semi-circular route that given the name Old Dixie Highway 91 in 2023. Washington County officials gave the former segment of US 91 the name as part of an effort to preserve the nickname Utah's Dixie for this region of Utah, co-inciding with the removal of the name Dixie from Utah Tech University. Dixie Highway 91 continues to Santa Clara and followed what is now SR-8 and SR-18 to St. George. Where SR-18 intersects St. George Blvd, US 91 then continued east on St. George Blvd. (SR-34) until it intersected Red Cliffs Rd. From there, US 91 went in a north-east direction, with Red Cliffs becoming Telegraph St. in Washington. US 91 followed on Telegraph until becoming Main St. in Leeds. After leaving Leeds, Old 91 is still intact until about a half mile north of the junction with SR-228 where its routing runs right into I-15.

US 91 picks up again in Black Rock in northern Washington County at exit 36 on I-15. It continues parallel to I-15 until just past exit 40, then picks up again on the other side of the freeway. This section of the road is not maintained and some of the original paving is still visible between the end of the road at Lower Taylor Creek Trailhead and when normal paving resumes near the road to New Harmony (old SR-144), at I-15 exit 42. The road, marked as Old US 91, then runs north through Kanarraville and into Cedar City near exit 57, merging into Main St (SR-130) until near the city border with Enoch just past exit 62. Old US 91 continues to parallel I-15 to Summit. The road crosses I-15 again at exit 71 and continues its original route through Parowan, merging with SR-274 after briefly running along modern SR-143. There is no additional signage in Parowan to indicate the original route, though historical maps show that it follows SR-271 through Paragonah. There are some frontage roads along I-15 through Beaver that may be sections of the original highway in Iron County.

In Beaver County, sections of SR-160 through Beaver and the road running north through Manderfield use original sections of US 91. There are also sections of roadway that used to be US 91 from before exit 129 through Cove Fort, Utah, in Millard County, intersecting both I-70 and later I-15 north of the I-70/I-15 interchange, including what is now SR-161. Some frontage roads along I-15 may be parts of US 91. The route picks up again at exit 146 on SR-133 through Kanosh and Meadow before being supplanted by frontage roads and I-15. SR-99 through Fillmore and SR-64 through Holden are also pieces of US 91 before running concurrently with US 50 until it merges again with I-15.

The original alignment of US 91 also diverges from I-15 through most of Juab County. At Chicken Creek Reservoir, the historic route of US 91 leaves I-15 and follows SR-78 northeast to Levan where it turns north along modern SR-28 and continues through Nephi along that city's Main Street. North of Nephi, it follows what is now Mona Road, passing through Mona, before rejoining the modern I-15 alignment near Rocky Ridge. In Utah County, the old US 91 leaves I-15 again at Santaquin, following SR-198 northeast through Payson and Salem before reaching Spanish Fork. In Spanish Fork, it ran north on Main Street (now SR-156, east on 800 North, and northeast on what is now SR-51 to Springville.

In Springville US 91 first joined US 89 at one of the oldest grade-separated interchanges in Utah (this portion is now SR-51). From this junction to Logan the two highways ran mostly concurrent. This portion is mostly intact as US 89.

However, US 91 diverged from US 89 between Farmington and Ogden. US 91 split away on what is now State Route 273, State Route 126 and State Route 26. These highways form the Main Street through Kaysville and Layton; State Street from the Layton-Clearfield border to Main Street in Clearfield though the city of Sunset turning into 1900 West at the Sunset-Roy border, then following 1900 West to a junction with Riverdale Road in Roy, then following Riverdale Road through Riverdale, and then meeting back up with US 89 at Washington Blvd in Ogden.

=== Idaho ===
US 91 formerly entered Idaho Falls along Yellowstone Highway, and returned to the course of modern I-15 north of town. The highway then proceeded north toward Monida Pass where the highway entered Montana. In some small towns streets used by the route are called "Old Highway 91".

=== Montana ===
In Montana, the highway's alignment slightly changed with the construction of the Clark Canyon Dam.

Starting just south of Dillon, I-15 was built on a new alignment that mostly parallels US 91 and crosses over it several times. In Dillon, the former route of the highway is now known as Atlantic Street and Montana Street. The highway formerly joined with U.S. Route 10 between Rocker and downtown Butte and took a northeasterly path to Elk Park Pass before it was rerouted to its current alignment east of Butte in 1980 (today's southbound lanes of I-15). It formed the main street of Boulder before I-15 was completed, and was routed through Helena along what is now Montana Secondary Highway 518 and Montana Secondary Highway 229.

Because of the new alignment of I-15 in Montana, many segments of the former US 91 are still in use today as frontage roads or sportsmen access points along the Missouri River, especially from Helena north to Great Falls and Sweetgrass, and from Butte south to Divide and Dillon.

== In popular culture ==
The US 91 corridor in Idaho's Cache Valley was the primary filming location for the 2004 movie Napoleon Dynamite. The former U.S. Route 91 corridor was also the birthplace of both McDonald's, with the first location opening on E Street in San Bernardino (E Street was the routing of US 91 before the construction of freeways in the area), as well as the first Kentucky Fried Chicken, with the first location opening in Salt Lake City at State Street and 3900 South. The McDonald's location is now a museum, while the KFC is still in operation with a small historical display inside the restaurant.

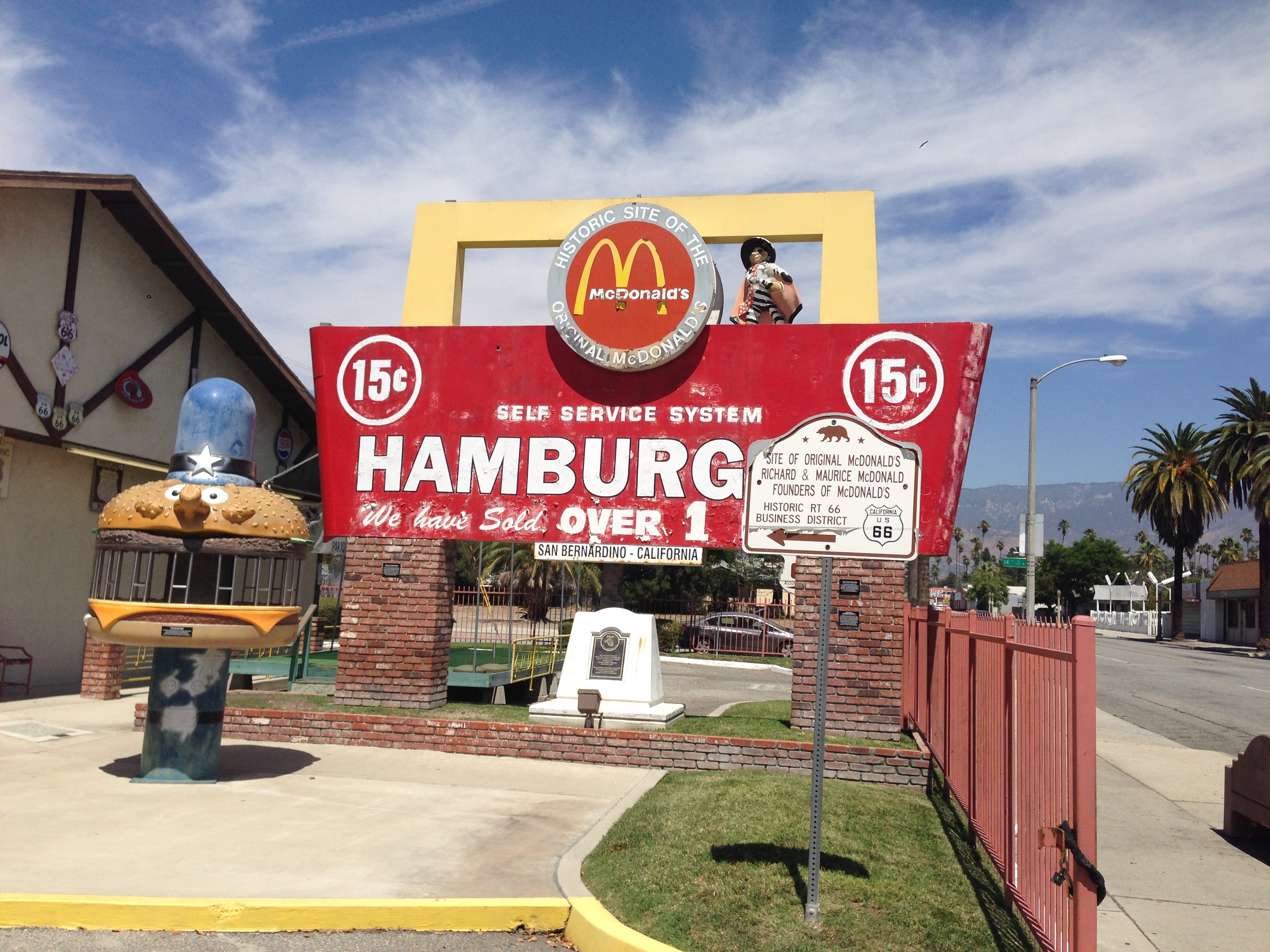
The site of the first McDonalds restaurant in San Bernardino, California (August 2014)

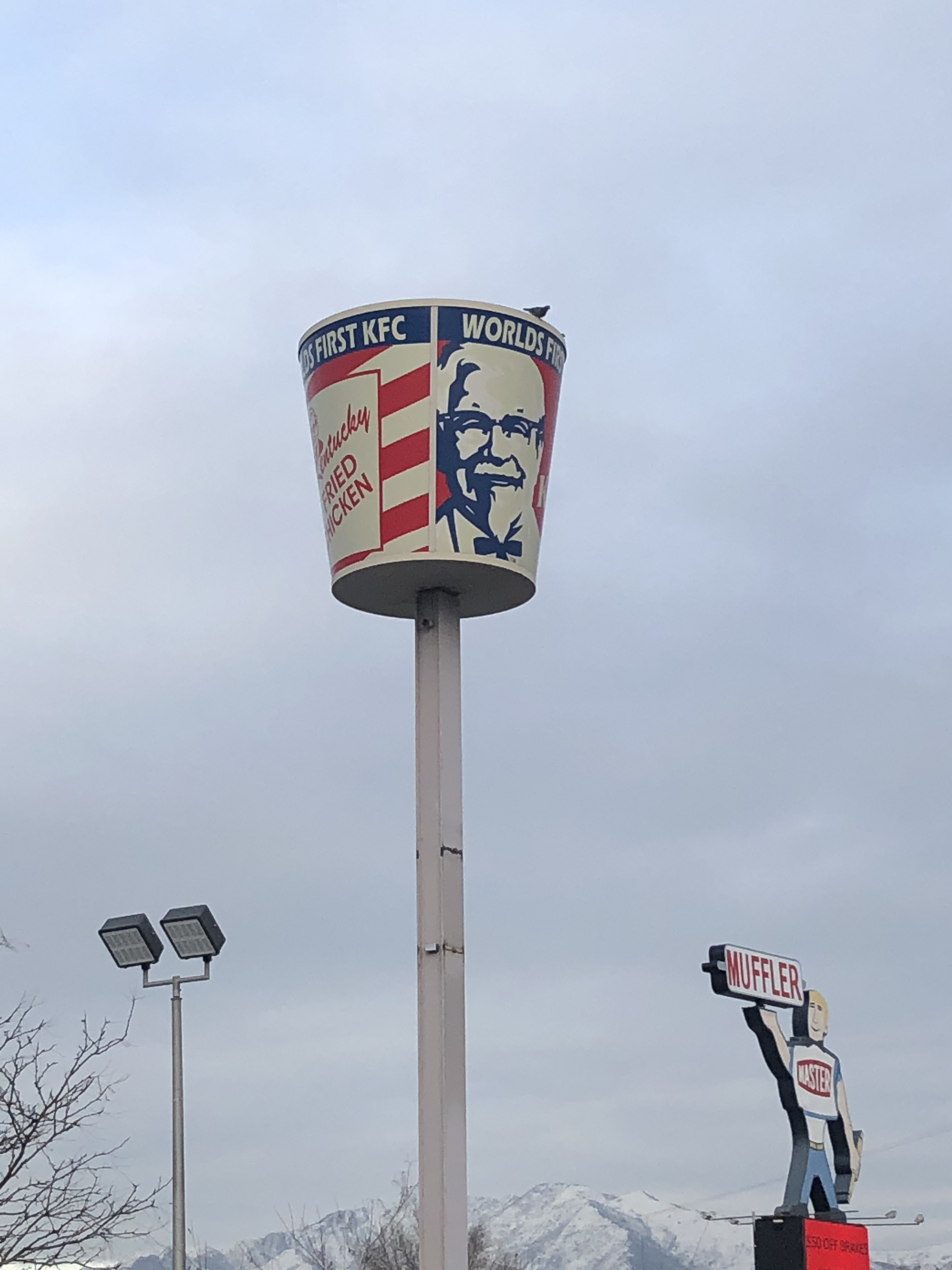
KFC bucket sign proclaims "World's First KFC on State Street and 3900 South in Salt Lake County, Utah (January 2020)

The novel Damnation Alley (1969) by Roger Zelazny features the beginning of a cross-country trip on Route 91, just outside of Los Angeles.

The 2016 documentary California Typewriter features a brief segment about the road as part of the Ed Ruscha book Royal Road Test. In it, Ruscha, Mason Williams, and Patrick Blackwell use the road as a testing strip for the book by throwing a Royal typewriter out of the window of their car at 90 miles per hour.

== Major intersections ==
State	County	Location	mi	km	Destinations	Notes
Utah	Box Elder	Brigham City	0.000	0.000	I-15 / I-84 / 1100 South – Ogden, Pocatello, Twin Falls	Southern terminus; road continues west as 1100 S. I-15 exit 362; Diverging diamond interchange
Utah	Box Elder	Brigham City	1.965	3.162	US 89 south (Main Street south) / SR-13 north (Main Street north) – Perry	South end of US 89 overlap
Utah	Box Elder	Brigham City	3.920	6.309	SR-90 west – Brigham City	Interchange; southbound exit and northbound entrance
Utah	Box Elder	Mantua	5.601	9.014	Mantua	Interchange; northbound exit and southbound entrance
Utah	Cache	Wellsville	16.939	27.261	SR-23 north – Mendon	
Utah	Cache	Wellsville	19.177	30.862	SR-101 – Hyrum	
Utah	Cache	Logan	23.769	38.252	SR-252 north (1000 West)	
Utah	Cache	Logan	26.651	42.891	SR-165 south – Hyrum, Nibley	
Utah	Cache	Logan	26.242	42.232	300 South	Former SR-238
Utah	Cache	Logan	26.886	43.269	SR-30 west (200 North) – Tremonton	
Utah	Cache	Logan	27.148	43.690	US 89 north – Garden City, Utah State University, Bear Lake	North end of US 89 overlap
Utah	Cache	Logan	28.425	45.746	1400 North	Former SR-239
Utah	Cache	North Logan	29.819	47.989	SR-252 south (2500 North)	
Utah	Cache	Hyde Park	31.305	50.381	Hyde Park Lane	Former SR-237
Utah	Cache	Smithfield	34.021	54.751	SR-218 west – Newton	
Utah	Cache	Richmond	40.004	64.380	SR-142 west – Trenton	
Utah	Cache	Lewiston	43.694	70.319	SR-61 west – Lewiston	
			45.271 0.000	72.857 0.000	Utah–Idaho line	
Idaho	Franklin	Preston	8.389	13.501	SH-36 west – Weston	South end of SH-36 overlap
Idaho	Franklin	Preston	9.265	14.911	SH-34 north / SH-36 east – Montpelier, Soda Springs	North end of SH-36 overlap
Idaho	Bannock	Downey	37.070	59.658	SH-40	
Idaho	Bannock		42.462 35.900	68.336 57.775	I-15 – Pocatello, Malad	South end of I-15 overlap (mileposts begin reflecting distance along I-15), exit 36.
Idaho	Bannock				US-91 overlaps with I-15 (exits 36–67)	
Idaho	Bannock	Pocatello	66.806 0.000	107.514 0.000	I-15 / I-15 BL / US 30	North end of I-15 overlap (mileposts end reflecting distance along I-15), exit 67; South end of I-15 Bus. overlap (mileposts begin reflecting distance along I-15 Bus.)
Idaho	Bannock	Pocatello	3.442	5.539	US 30 west	North end of US 30 overlap
Idaho	Bannock	Pocatello	4.459 77.890	7.176 125.352	I-15 BL	North end of I-15 Bus. overlap (mileposts end reflecting distance along I-15 Bus.)
Idaho	Bannock	Chubbuck	80.020	128.780	I-86 – Twin Falls, Boise	I-86 exit 61.
Idaho	Bingham		97.024 0.000	156.145 0.000	I-15 – Pocatello, Idaho Falls	I-15 exit 89; south end of I-15 Bus. overlap (mileposts begin reflecting distance along I-15 Bus.)
Idaho	Bingham	Blackfoot	3.659 100.700	5.889 162.061	I-15 BL – Pocatello, Idaho Falls	North end of I-15 Bus. overlap (mileposts end reflecting distance along I-15 Bus.)
Idaho	Bonneville		122.866 2.323	197.734 3.739	York Road/Old I-15 Bus.	Mileposts begin reflecting distance along old I-15 Bus. alignment
Idaho	Bonneville	Idaho Falls	4.526	7.284	I-15 BL / US 26 – Idaho Falls	Northern terminus
1.000 mi = 1.609 km; 1.000 km = 0.621 mi: Concurrency terminus; Incomplete access

== See also ==
- Route 91 Harvest, an annual country music event held from 2014 to 2017 on old US 91 near Las Vegas, Nevada
- U.S. Route 191
- U.S. Route 491
- U.S. Route 91 Alternate (Nevada)

== Notes ==
Browse numbered routes
← SR 90	AZ	→ SR 92
← SR-90	UT	→ SR-92
← US 89	ID	→ US 93
← I-90	MT	→ US 93
