= Utah State Route 142 =

State highway in Utah, United States

State Route 142

Route information
- Maintained by UDOT
- Length: 17.353 mi (27.927 km)
- Existed: 1933–present

Major junctions
- South end: SR-23 in Newton
- East end: US 91 in Richmond

Location
- Country: United States
- State: Utah

Highway system
- Utah State Highway System; Interstate; US; State; Minor; Scenic
← SR-141	→ SR-143

State Route 142 (SR-142) is a state highway in the U.S. state of Utah. At 17.3 miles (27.8 km) long, it connects the towns of Newton, Clarkston, Trenton, and Richmond to US-91 and SR-23 in northern Cache County.

== Route description ==
The route starts at its intersection with SR-23 in Newton and travels about 5 miles (8.0 km) northwest to Clarkston. Here the route turns east and travels just over 12 miles (19 km) through Trenton and ends in Richmond at the intersection with US-91.

== History ==
The state legislature created State Route 142 in 1933, connecting SR-69 (now SR-30) at Petersboro with Newton and Smithfield. SR-142 was moved to the present route of Newton to Clarkston at SR-170 in 1941, with the old alignment through downtown Newton to Smithfield becoming SR-218.

In 1969, SR-170, which ran from Clarkston via Trenton to Richmond was absorbed into SR-142, and SR-170 was deleted. This completed the current route of SR-142 as it runs today.

== Major intersections ==
The entire route is in Cache County.

Location	mi	km	Destinations	Notes
Newton	0.000	0.000	SR-23	Southern terminus
Trenton	9.779	15.738	SR-23	
Richmond	17.353	27.927	US 91	Eastern terminus
1.000 mi = 1.609 km; 1.000 km = 0.621 mi
