= Utah State Route 218 =

State highway in Utah, United States

State Route 218
- SR-218 highlighted in red

Route information
- Maintained by UDOT
- Length: 8.223 mi (13.234 km)
- Existed: (1933–1941 as part of SR-142); 1941–present

Major junctions
- West end: SR-23 east of Newton
- East end: US 91 in Smithfield

Location
- Country: United States
- State: Utah
- Counties: Cache

Highway system
- Utah State Highway System; Interstate; US; State; Minor; Scenic
← I-215	→ SR-219

State Route 218 (SR-218) is a state highway in the U.S. state of Utah. Spanning 8.2 miles (13.2 km), it serves as an east/west rural connector, connecting the town of Newton on SR-23 with the city of Smithfield on US-91 in Cache County.

== Route description ==
State Route 218 begins just east of the town of Newton in Cache County. Other than the ends of the route entering towns, the entire route passes through farmland. Beginning as an extension of Main Street (SR-23), it travels southeast about 1.1 miles (1.8 km) before turning due east, crossing a northern arm of Cutler Reservoir and passing the town of Amalga. Just after passing Amalga, the route takes a short jog to the southeast and crosses a bridge over the Bear River. From there, the route continues to the east and enters the city of Smithfield on 100 North, where it ends at its intersection with Main Street (US-91).

== History ==
The road from Newton east to Smithfield was first added to the state highway system in 1933 as part of SR-142, which approached the west side of Newton from the south, then turned east to travel through the town and continued east to Smithfield. In 1941, SR-142 was rerouted to exit Newton to the northwest (toward Clarkston), so the former routing along Main Street through Newton was redesignated as SR-218. In 1953, SR-23 was designated, incorporating the southern approach of SR-142 to Newton, SR-218 through the center of Newton, and leaving Newton to the northeast along what was then SR-192. As a result, State Route 218 was shortened by approximately 1 mile (1.6 km), as it now started on the east end of the town.

Save for a minor realignment west of Smithfield to utilize a new bridge over the Bear River built in 1959, the route has remained unchanged since.

== Major intersections ==
The entire route is in Cache County.

Location	mi	km	Destinations	Notes
Newton	0.000	0.000	SR-23	Western terminus
Smithfield	8.223	13.234	US 91 (Main Street)	Eastern terminus
1.000 mi = 1.609 km; 1.000 km = 0.621 mi
