= College Ward, Utah =

Unincorporated community in the state of Utah, United States

- Unincorporated community
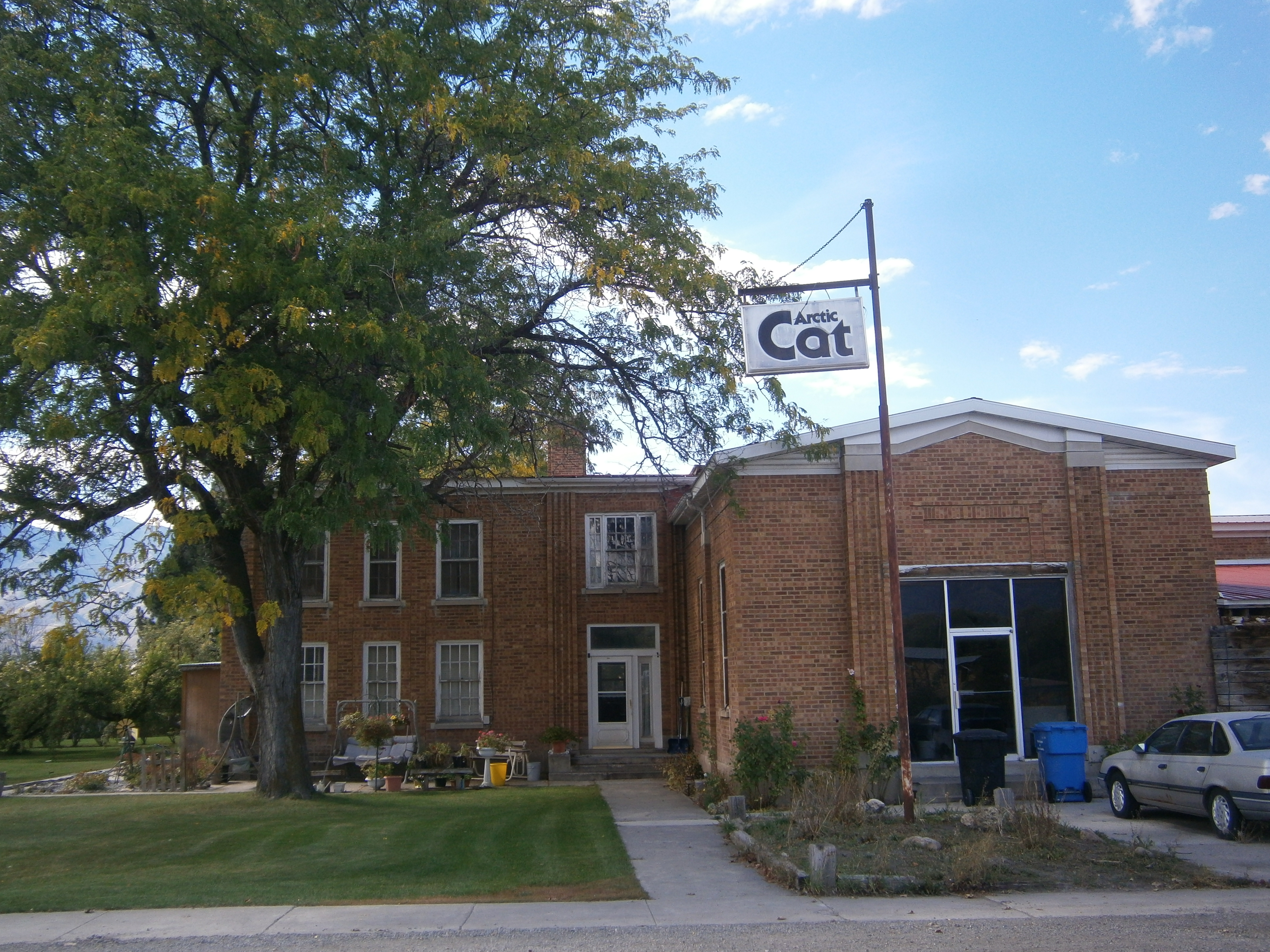
- Former College Ward LDS Church meetinghouse, September 2015

- Location within Utah Location within the United States
- Coordinates: 41°40′37″N 111°52′48″W
- Country: United States
- State: Utah
- County: Cache
- Settled: 1879
- Named for: Brigham Young College
- Elevation: 4,495 ft (1,370 m)
- Time zone: UTC-7 (Mountain (MST))
  - Summer (DST): UTC-6 (MDT)
- ZIP code: 84339
- Area code: 435
- GNIS feature ID: 1439893

College Ward is an unincorporated community in Cache County, Utah, United States.

The community is located in the southern Cache Valley along U.S. routes 89/91, approximately midway between Wellsville and Logan, the county seat. The city of Nibley borders College Ward to the east.

== History ==
This area was part of a tract of more than 9,000 acres (3,600 ha) that Brigham Young donated in 1877 for the endowment of Brigham Young College. The first settlers leased plots of land and moved here in 1879.

== Demographics ==
Historical population
Census	Pop.	Note	%±
1900	261		—
1910	254		−2.7%
1920	321		26.4%
1930	432		34.6%
1940	313		−27.5%
1950	276		−11.8%
Source: U.S. Census Bureau
