= Utah State Route 200 =

State highway in Utah, United States

State Route 200
- SR-200 highlighted in red

Route information
- Maintained by UDOT
- Length: 1.565 mi (2.519 km)
- Existed: 1930s–present

Major junctions
- South end: SR-61 in Lewiston
- North end: Idaho state line near Fairview, ID

Location
- Country: United States
- State: Utah

Highway system
- Utah State Highway System; Interstate; US; State; Minor; Scenic
← SR-199	→ SR-201

State Route 200 (SR-200) is a 1.565-mile-long (2.519 km) state highway in the U.S. state of Utah. It serves to connect Lewiston's Center Street (SR-61) to the Idaho border. The roadway continues north past the state line into the city of Preston, Idaho.

== Route description ==
SR-200 begins eight blocks west of the city center of Lewiston along a roadway designated 800 West. Heading due north from Center Street (SR-61), SR-200 travels through rural farmland, only intersecting one street, 800 North, before reaching the Idaho state line. The shoulder of the highway is less than one and nine-tenths feet (58 cm) wide, thus is not considered a bicycle friendly route. The Utah Department of Transportation (UDOT) classifies the route as a collector route. Every year, UDOT conducts a series of surveys on its highways in the state to measure traffic volume. This is expressed in terms of average annual daily traffic (AADT), a measure of traffic volume for any average day of the year. In 2012, UDOT calculated that 1,145 vehicles used the highway on an average day, representing a decrease in traffic over the last two years (1,170 in 2011, 1,175 in 2010). Eighteen percent of this was truck traffic.

== History ==
The roadway linking Lewiston to Preston has existed since at least 1937.

== Major intersections ==
The entire route is in Cache County.

Location	mi	km	Destinations	Notes
Lewiston	0.000	0.000	SR-61 (Center Street)	Southern terminus Roadway continues south as 800 West
	1.565	2.519	Idaho state line	Northern terminus Roadway continues north as State Street
1.000 mi = 1.609 km; 1.000 km = 0.621 mi
