= La Plata, Utah =

- Ghost town
- Location of La Plata in Utah La Plata (the United States)
- Coordinates: 41°26′38″N 111°40′47″W
- Country: United States
- State: Utah
- County: Cache
- Founded: 1891
- Abandoned: 1894
- Named after: Spanish for "silver"
- Elevation: 7,470 ft (2,277 m)
- Time zone: UTC-7 (Mountain (MST))
  - Summer (DST): UTC-6 (MDT)
- GNIS feature ID: 1448560

La Plata is a ghost town on the southern end of Cache County, Utah, United States. Located in the Bear River Mountains on a small tributary of the east fork of the Little Bear River, La Plata was a short-lived silver mining boomtown in the 1890s.

== History ==
The first ore in the area was discovered in July 1891 by a mountain shepherd, who brought a curiously dense rock to show his foreman. The foreman recognized it as silver-bearing galena and took it to be assayed in Ogden. The sample was 45% lead, with a silver concentration of 400 ounces per ton. The two quietly registered a mining claim, but the secret got out. Several more high-grade ore pockets were found, and a silver rush began. This was the first major Utah mining claim ever found north of Salt Lake City, and many northern Utahns became interested. By August 1891 more than 1000 miners had arrived, and the number soon reached 1500. Lines of cabins and stores stretched along either side of the creek, forming a town called La Plata (Spanish for "silver"). There were 60–70 buildings in all, including two stores, saloons, a bank, and a post office.

Because La Plata was populated largely by locals who had temporarily become miners, it was different from most western mining camps. It never had a cemetery, as there were never any killings in town. When a few prostitutes tried to set up business here, they were driven out. The Thatcher Brothers Bank in Logan bought the original claim, called the Sundown Mine. Ore was shipped north to Logan then transported by rail to Salt Lake City. Both Cache and Weber counties were petitioned to build roads to the site; the Cache road was completed first and somewhat less difficult to travel, although there was no easy route to La Plata.

La Plata's high elevation made for harsh winters, and few people stayed after the 1891 season. Only 150 inhabitants were still found in January 1892. By then the richest ore had started to run out; the highest concentrations of silver were found on or close to the surface. The return of warmer weather brought a second, smaller rush; the population was back up to 600 by July 1892. By the summer of 1892, companies rather than individuals controlled most of the mining, and Utah farmers who had rushed in to get rich found they couldn't compete with the experienced miners who had come from all over the Western United States. Confidence and profits were also hurt by a pair of lawsuits filed in 1892, the plaintiffs claiming to hold title to the lands where silver had been discovered. One suit was settled in 1894, and the other decided in favor of the miners in 1895, but the litigation, including temporary restraining orders that closed most of the mines, was very bad for business and for the community. The silver mining operations had little chance to recover before the Panic of 1893, which closed many silver mines nationwide. A few mines remained open at La Plata, continuing to produce lead, until its price also dropped. The town did not last through 1894, although some sporadic mining activity continued as late as 1906.

Today the site of La Plata is surrounded by private land, which has helped preserve a few old cabins here. Mining machinery and collapsing shafts also remain as traces of the old silver mines.
