= Dayton, Idaho =

- City
- Location of Dayton in Franklin County, Idaho.
- Coordinates: 42°06′52″N 112°00′02″W
- Country: United States
- State: Idaho
- County: Franklin

Area
  - Total: 6.71 sq mi (17.39 km^{2})
  - Land: 6.68 sq mi (17.29 km^{2})
  - Water: 0.042 sq mi (0.11 km^{2})
- Elevation: 4,751 ft (1,448 m)

Population (2020)
  - Total: 510
  - Density: 74.0/sq mi (28.58/km^{2})
- Time zone: UTC-7 (Mountain (MST))
  - Summer (DST): UTC-6 (MDT)
- ZIP code: 83232
- Area code: 208
- FIPS code: 16-20710
- GNIS feature ID: 2410298

Dayton is a city in Franklin County, Idaho, United States. The population was 510 at the 2020 census. It is part of the Logan, Utah-Idaho Metropolitan Statistical Area.

== History ==
In 1867, Joseph Chadwick and his family settled on Five Mile Creek and built a log cabin. In one room he had a supply store to accommodate the few settlers and freighters. He was followed by Peter Poole, Robert Taylor, Stephen Callan, George Mendenhall, Richard Wickham and their families. The locality was originally known as Franklin Meadows. It was later known as Five Mile Creek, then Chadville, and in 1890 Card. In 1906 William B. Preston gave it the name of Dayton. Fred Jenson was the first Mormon Presiding Elder.

Dayton had 271 residents in 1930.

== Geography ==
Dayton lies on the west side of Cache Valley, along Five Mile Creek at the base of the Bannock Mountains.

According to the United States Census Bureau, the city has a total area of 6.56 square miles (16.99 km^{2}), of which, 6.52 square miles (16.89 km^{2}) is land and 0.04 square miles (0.10 km^{2}) is water.

=== Climate ===
This climatic region is typified by large seasonal temperature differences, with warm to hot (and often humid) summers and cold (sometimes severely cold) winters. According to the Köppen Climate Classification system, Dayton has a humid continental climate, abbreviated "Dfb" on climate maps.

== Demographics ==
Historical population
| Census | Pop. | Note | %± |
|---|---|---|---|
| 1920 | 225 | | — |
| 1930 | 271 | | 20.4% |
| 1940 | 364 | | 34.3% |
| 1950 | 287 | | −21.2% |
| 1960 | 212 | | −26.1% |
| 1970 | 198 | | −6.6% |
| 1980 | 368 | | 85.9% |
| 1990 | 357 | | −3.0% |
| 2000 | 444 | | 24.4% |
| 2010 | 463 | | 4.3% |
| 2020 | 510 | | 10.2% |
U.S. Decennial Census

=== 2010 census ===
As of the census of 2010, there were 463 people, 134 households, and 116 families residing in the city. The population density was 71.0 inhabitants per square mile (27.4/km^{2}). There were 144 housing units at an average density of 22.1 per square mile (8.5/km^{2}). The racial makeup of the city was 93.1% White, 4.3% from other races, and 2.6% from two or more races. Hispanic or Latino of any race were 6.5% of the population.

There were 134 households, of which 48.5% had children under the age of 18 living with them, 76.9% were married couples living together, 8.2% had a female householder with no husband present, 1.5% had a male householder with no wife present, and 13.4% were non-families. 11.2% of all households were made up of individuals, and 6.7% had someone living alone who was 65 years of age or older. The average household size was 3.46 and the average family size was 3.72.

The median age in the city was 31.1 years. 32.8% of residents were under the age of 18; 9.9% were between the ages of 18 and 24; 20.7% were from 25 to 44; 23.2% were from 45 to 64; and 13.4% were 65 years of age or older. The gender makeup of the city was 50.8% male and 49.2% female.

=== 2000 census ===
As of the census of 2000, there were 444 people, 126 households, and 105 families residing in the city. The population density was 67.4 inhabitants per square mile (26.0/km^{2}). There were 133 housing units at an average density of 20.2 per square mile (7.8/km^{2}). The racial makeup of the city was 97.07% White, 0.23% African American, 0.68% Native American, 0.90% from other races, and 1.13% from two or more races. Hispanic or Latino of any race were 0.90% of the population.

There were 126 households, out of which 51.6% had children under the age of 18 living with them, 72.2% were married couples living together, 7.1% had a female householder with no husband present, and 15.9% were non-families. 14.3% of all households were made up of individuals, and 11.1% had someone living alone who was 65 years of age or older. The average household size was 3.52 and the average family size was 3.95.

In the city, the population was spread out, with 41.9% under the age of 18, 6.8% from 18 to 24, 22.5% from 25 to 44, 17.1% from 45 to 64, and 11.7% who were 65 years of age or older. The median age was 27 years. For every 100 females, there were 101.8 males. For every 100 females age 18 and over, there were 100.0 males.

The median income for a household in the city was $36,442, and the median income for a family was $37,308. Males had a median income of $26,786 versus $22,188 for females. The per capita income for the city was $11,653. About 8.5% of families and 8.8% of the population were below the poverty line, including 9.7% of those under age 18 and 6.4% of those age 65 or over.
