= Avon, Utah =

- CDP
- Location in Cache County and the state of Utah.
- Coordinates: 41°31′10″N 111°48′26″W
- Country: United States
- State: Utah
- County: Cache
- Settled: 1860
- Named for: Stratford-upon-Avon

Area
  - Total: 7.3 sq mi (18.9 km^{2})
  - Land: 7.3 sq mi (18.9 km^{2})
  - Water: 0 sq mi (0.0 km^{2})
- Elevation: 5,043 ft (1,537 m)

Population (2020)
  - Total: 390
  - Density: 42/sq mi (16.2/km^{2})
- Time zone: UTC-7 (Mountain (MST))
  - Summer (DST): UTC-6 (MDT)
- ZIP code: 84328
- Area code: 435
- FIPS code: 49-02960
- GNIS feature ID: 2407786

Avon is a census-designated place (CDP) in Cache County, Utah, United States. The population was 390 at the 2020 census. It is included in the Logan, Utah-Idaho (partial) Metropolitan Statistical Area.

Avon is the birthplace of Reuben D. Law, first president of the Church College of Hawaii, later renamed Brigham Young University–Hawaii.

== History ==
The first settlement at Avon was made in 1860. A post office called Avon was established in 1894, and remained in operation until 1919. The community was named after Avon, England, the native home of a large share of the early settlers.

== Geography ==
According to the United States Census Bureau, the CDP has a total area of 7.1 square miles (18.4 km^{2}), all land.

== Demographics ==
Historical population
Census	Pop.	Note	%±
2000	306		—
2010	367		19.9%
2020	390		6.3%

As of the census of 2000, there were 306 people, 85 households, and 77 families residing in the CDP. The population density was 42.0 inhabitants per square mile (16.2/km^{2}). There were 93 housing units at an average density of 12.8 per square mile (4.9/km^{2}). The racial makeup of the CDP was 96.08% White, 0.33% African American and 3.59% Pacific Islander. Hispanic or Latino of any race were 1.96% of the population.

There were 85 households, out of which 62.4% had children under the age of 18 living with them, 84.7% were married couples living together, 2.4% had a female householder with no husband present, and 9.4% were non-families. 9.4% of all households were made up of individuals, and 2.4% had someone living alone who was 65 years of age or older. The average household size was 3.60 and the average family size was 3.86.

In the CDP, the population was spread out, with 39.5% under the age of 18, 9.5% from 18 to 24, 25.2% from 25 to 44, 21.6% from 45 to 64, and 4.2% who were 65 years of age or older. The median age was 26 years. For every 100 females, there were 97.4 males. For every 100 females age 18 and over, there were 103.3 males.

The median income for a household in the CDP was $39,250, and the median income for a family was $41,875. Males had a median income of $26,250 versus $26,094 for females. The per capita income for the CDP was $13,875. About 3.0% of families and 5.1% of the population were below the poverty line, including 8.7% of those under the age of eighteen and none of those 65 or over.

== See also ==
- List of census-designated places in Utah
