= Cache County, Utah =

County in Utah, United States

- County
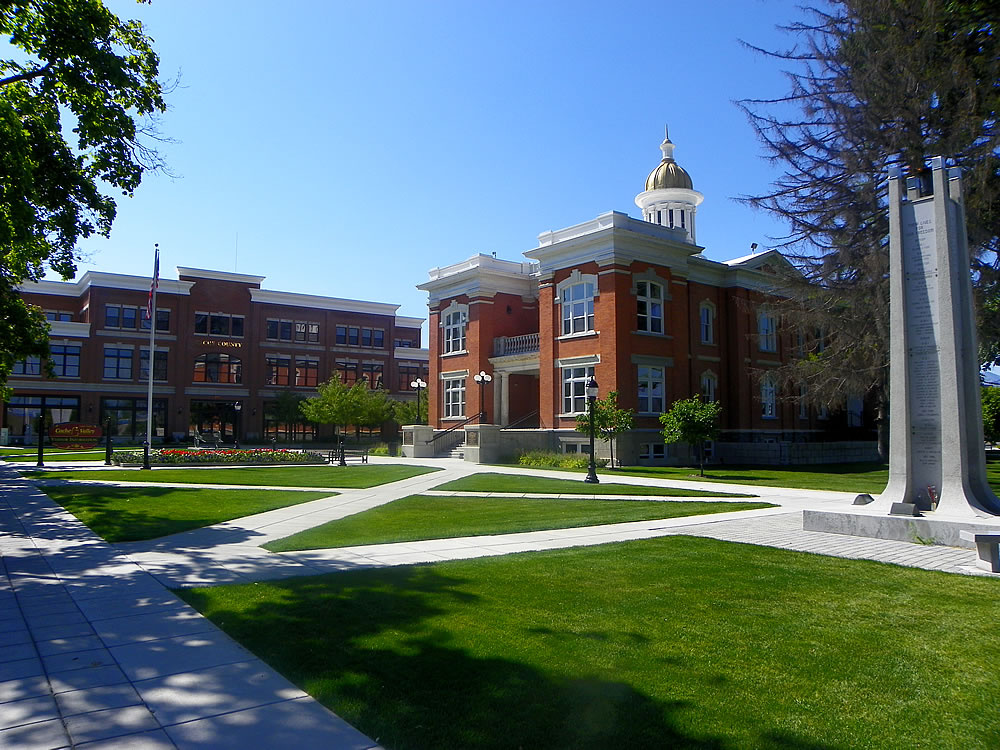
- Cache County Courthouse, July 2009

- Location within the U.S. state of Utah
- Coordinates: 41.69°N 111.75°W
- Country: United States
- State: Utah
- Founded: January 5, 1856 (created); April 4, 1857 (organized)
- Named for: Fur trade
- Seat: Logan
- Largest city: Logan

Area
  - Total: 1,173 sq mi (3,040 km^{2})
  - Land: 1,165 sq mi (3,020 km^{2})
  - Water: 8.2 sq mi (21 km^{2}) 0.7%

Population (2020)
  - Total: 133,154
  - Estimate (2025): 145,000 ▲
  - Density: 114.3/sq mi (44.13/km^{2})
- Time zone: UTC−7 (Mountain)
  - Summer (DST): UTC−6 (MDT)
- Congressional district: 1st
- Website: www.cachecounty.gov

Cache County (/kæʃ/ KASH) is a county located in the northern region of Utah bordering Idaho. As of the 2020 United States census, the population was 133,154, with an estimate of 145,000 residents in 2025. Its county seat and largest city is Logan. Cache County is one of two counties included in the Logan metropolitan area, alongside Franklin County, Idaho.

== History ==
Indigenous peoples occupied the valleys of present Cache County as much as 10,000 BCE. Near the present epoch, the valley served the Plains Indians and the Shoshone. Trappers and explorers visited the area in the late 18th and early 19th centuries. John Henry Weber and Jim Bridger came through in 1824; Peter Skene Ogden and James Beckwourth passed through in 1825.

In July 1855, a group of settlers from the LDS Church drove a herd of cattle into the valley and camped at Haw Bush Spring (present Elkhorn Ranch). However, the cold winter drove the settlers back to the Salt Lake Valley. Peter Maughan, who had requested better land for agriculture for the families of his settlement in Lake Point, Utah, was called by President Brigham Young to establish a new settlement in the Cache Valley. On September 15, 1856, he established Maughan's Fort, which grew into present day Wellsville. More settlers arrived in the valley, and by 1859 the settlements of Providence, Mendon, Logan, Richmond, and Smithfield had been established.

In preparation for this influx, the Utah Territory legislature created a county, effective January 5, 1856, with seats and government incomplete. By April 4, 1857, the organization was completed, and Logan became the seat. It was named for the fur stashes, known in French as Caches, made by many of the Rocky Mountain Fur Company trappers. The county gained area in 1862 when its boundary lines with adjacent counties were adjusted. In 1863, the federal government enacted the Idaho Territory, which administratively removed the described portions of Cache County that lay north of the territorial border. Then in 1864, the east part of the county was partitioned to become Rich County. The borders of Cache County have remained in their present state since 1864.

A rail line between Brigham City and Logan was completed in 1873 (Utah and Northern Railway). The line was extended into Idaho, and a connection was made to the transcontinental railroad, which opened the world to Cache County; their crops (especially grain and dairy) began moving to broader markets. The county's sheep population also burgeoned, from 10,000 in 1880 to 300,000 by 1900. By 1900 the Forest Service began regulating grazing practices, which brought the sheep population under control.

There were 16,000 dairy cows in Cache County in 1910. Commercial creameries, flour mills, woolen mills, and knitting factories developed around the farm-based economy. Cache presently continues as the state's leader in dairy products and as a major producer of hay, alfalfa, and grain.

== Geography ==
Cache County lies on the north edge of Utah. Its north border abuts the south border of the state of Idaho. On the western edge of the county are the Wellsville Mountains and on the eastern edge are the Bear River Mountains, both northern branches of the Wasatch Range. The Cache Valley reaches north to the state border. The Bear River Mountains, the northernmost extension of the Wasatch Range, cover the eastern half of the county. The county's highest elevation is Naomi Peak in the northeast part of the county, at 9,979 feet (3,042 m) above sea level. The Bear River flows through Cache Valley. The county has a total area of 1,173 square miles (3,040 km^{2}), of which 1,165 square miles (3,020 km^{2}) is land and 8.2 square miles (21 km^{2}) (0.7%) is water.

=== Major highways ===
- U.S. Highway 89
- U.S. Highway 91
- State Route 23
- State Route 30
- State Route 101
- State Route 142
- State Route 165
- State Route 200
- State Route 218
- State Route 252

=== Adjacent counties ===
- Oneida County, Idaho - northwest
- Franklin County, Idaho - north
- Bear Lake County, Idaho - northeast
- Rich County - east
- Weber County - south
- Box Elder County - west

=== Protected areas ===
- Cache National Forest (part)
- Caribou National Forest (part)
- Hardware Ranch Wildlife Management Area (state park)
- Tony Grove Lake Campground (US Forest Service)
- Millville Face Wildlife Management Area

=== Lakes ===
- Crescent Lake
- Cutler Reservoir
- Hyrum Reservoir
- Newton Reservoir
- Porcupine Reservoir
- Tony Grove Lake

== Government and politics ==
Cache County is governed by a seven-member County Council which exercises legislative authority, while the county additionally elects a County Executive who oversees the day-to-day operations of the County. Various other offices in the Cache County government are filled by election. At the state-level, the county elects eight officials at large. As of 2025, all county elected officials were members of the Republican Party.

Elected County Council and County Executive
Position	District	Name	Affiliation
Council Member	Southeast District	Kathryn Beus	Republican
Council Member	North District	David Erickson	Republican
Council Member	Logan Seat #1	Keegan Garrity	Republican
Council Member	Logan Seat #3	Sandi Goodlander	Republican
Council Member	South District	Nolan Gunnell	Republican
Council Member	Northeast District	Mark Hurd	Republican
Council Member	Logan Seat #2	JoAnn Bennett	Republican
County Executive/Surveyor	At-Large	N. George Daines	Republican

State Elected Offices
Position	District	Name	Affiliation	First Elected
Senate	1	Scott Sandall	Republican	2018
Senate	2	Chris H. Wilson	Republican	2020
House of Representatives	1	Thomas Peterson	Republican	2022
House of Representatives	2	Mike Petersen	Republican	2020
House of Representatives	3	Jason E. Thompson	Republican	2024
House of Representatives	5	Casey Snider	Republican	2018
Board of Education	1	Jennie Earl	Nonpartisan	2018

Like most of Utah, Cache County is strongly Republican in presidential elections. The last time it voted for a Democratic presidential candidate was 1944. This orientation is in contrast to most other American counties dominated by a major college town.

United States presidential election results for Cache County, Utah
Year	Republican		Democratic		Third party(ies)	
Year	No.	%	No.	%	No.	%
1896	839	16.03%	4,395	83.97%	0	0.00%
1900	2,820	47.59%	3,082	52.02%	23	0.39%
1904	4,008	56.89%	2,948	41.85%	89	1.26%
1908	3,787	52.81%	3,317	46.26%	67	0.93%
1912	2,825	37.92%	3,296	44.25%	1,328	17.83%
1916	3,756	41.09%	5,305	58.03%	81	0.89%
1920	5,063	53.88%	4,239	45.11%	95	1.01%
1924	4,973	52.01%	3,915	40.94%	674	7.05%
1928	5,297	52.60%	4,748	47.15%	26	0.26%
1932	4,829	42.20%	6,522	56.99%	93	0.81%
1936	3,258	27.25%	8,606	71.97%	93	0.78%
1940	5,184	39.70%	7,867	60.25%	7	0.05%
1944	4,938	41.33%	6,998	58.57%	12	0.10%
1948	6,514	50.32%	6,383	49.30%	49	0.38%
1952	10,167	70.56%	4,242	29.44%	0	0.00%
1956	10,349	73.82%	3,671	26.18%	0	0.00%
1960	10,281	67.65%	4,917	32.35%	0	0.00%
1964	9,326	58.46%	6,627	41.54%	0	0.00%
1968	11,906	68.81%	4,327	25.01%	1,070	6.18%
1972	16,538	76.83%	4,018	18.67%	969	4.50%
1976	16,636	71.73%	5,430	23.41%	1,128	4.86%
1980	20,251	78.69%	3,639	14.14%	1,845	7.17%
1984	22,127	83.68%	4,123	15.59%	192	0.73%
1988	21,766	77.84%	5,871	21.00%	326	1.17%
1992	15,971	51.98%	4,973	16.19%	9,781	31.83%
1996	16,832	63.77%	6,595	24.99%	2,967	11.24%
2000	25,920	78.21%	5,170	15.60%	2,052	6.19%
2004	32,486	81.76%	6,375	16.05%	870	2.19%
2008	29,127	69.48%	10,294	24.56%	2,501	5.97%
2012	35,039	82.85%	6,244	14.76%	1,010	2.39%
2016	21,139	45.25%	8,563	18.33%	17,016	36.42%
2020	38,032	66.06%	16,650	28.92%	2,889	5.02%
2024	39,457	65.48%	18,718	31.06%	2,083	3.46%

== Demographics ==
Historical population
Census	Pop.	Note	%±
1890	15,509		—
1900	18,139		17.0%
1910	23,062		27.1%
1920	26,992		17.0%
1930	27,424		1.6%
1940	29,797		8.7%
1950	33,536		12.5%
1960	35,788		6.7%
1970	42,331		18.3%
1980	57,176		35.1%
1990	70,183		22.7%
2000	91,391		30.2%
2010	112,656		23.3%
2020	133,154		18.2%
2025 (est.)	145,000	▲	8.9%
US Decennial Census; 1790–1960 1900–1990; 1990–2000 2010–2018 2019 2020

=== 2020 census ===
According to the 2020 United States census and 2020 American Community Survey, there were 133,154 people in Cache County with a population density of 114.3 people per square mile (44.1/km^{2}). Among non-Hispanic or Latino people, the racial makeup was 109,376 (82.1%) White, 1,045 (0.8%) African American, 620 (0.5%) Native American, 2,303 (1.7%) Asian, 660 (0.5%) Pacific Islander, 422 (0.3%) from other races, and 3,652 (2.7%) from two or more races. 15,076 (11.3%) people were Hispanic or Latino.

Cache County, Utah – Racial and ethnic composition Note: the US Census treats Hispanic/Latino as an ethnic category. This table excludes Latinos from the racial categories and assigns them to a separate category. Hispanics/Latinos may be of any race.
Race / Ethnicity (NH = Non-Hispanic)	Pop 2000	Pop 2010	Pop 2020	% 2000	% 2010	% 2020
White alone (NH)	81,989	96,283	109,376	89.71%	85.47%	82.14%
Black or African American alone (NH)	319	596	1,045	0.35%	0.53%	0.78%
Native American or Alaska Native alone (NH)	466	531	620	0.51%	0.47%	0.47%
Asian alone (NH)	1,803	2,096	2,303	1.97%	1.86%	1.73%
Pacific Islander alone (NH)	178	411	660	0.19%	0.36%	0.50%
Other race alone (NH)	53	101	422	0.06%	0.09%	0.32%
Mixed race or Multiracial (NH)	797	1,422	3,652	0.87%	1.26%	2.74%
Hispanic or Latino (any race)	5,786	11,216	15,076	6.33%	9.96%	11.32%
Total	91,391	112,656	133,154	100.00%	100.00%	100.00%

There were 66,362 (49.84%) males and 66,792 (50.16%) females, and the population distribution by age was 38,993 (29.3%) under the age of 18, 80,630 (60.6%) from 18 to 64, and 13,531 (10.2%) who were at least 65 years old. The median age was 26.3 years.

There were 41,658 households in Cache County with an average size of 3.20 of which 30,904 (74.2%) were families and 10,754 (25.8%) were non-families. Among all families, 25,928 (62.2%) were married couples, 1,688 (4.1%) were male householders with no spouse, and 3,288 (7.9%) were female householders with no spouse. Among all non-families, 7,130 (17.1%) were a single person living alone and 3,624 (8.7%) were two or more people living together. 16,542 (39.7%) of all households had children under the age of 18. 26,427 (63.4%) of households were owner-occupied while 15,231 (36.6%) were renter-occupied.

The median income for a Cache County household was $60,530 and the median family income was $69,109, with a per-capita income of $24,221. The median income for males that were full-time employees was $50,178 and for females $33,997. 14.6% of the population and 9.3% of families were below the poverty line.

In terms of education attainment, out of the 64,162 people in Cache County 25 years or older, 4,146 (6.5%) had not completed high school, 12,940 (20.2%) had a high school diploma or equivalency, 22,386 (34.9%) had some college or associate degree, 16,272 (25.4%) had a bachelor's degree, and 8,418 (13.1%) had a graduate or professional degree.

=== 2010 census ===
As of the 2010 United States census, there were 112,655 people, 34,722 households, and 26,464 families in the county. The population density was 96.7 people per square mile (37.3 people/km^{2}). There were 37,024 housing units at an average density of 31.78 units per square mile (12.27 units/km^{2}). The racial makeup of the county was 89.12% White, 0.62% Black or African American, 0.61% Native American, 1.88% Asian, 0.39% Pacific Islander, 5.48% from other races, and 1.90% from two or more races. 9.96% of the population was Hispanic or Latino of any race.

There were 34,722 households, out of which 41.34% had children under 18 living with them, 76.22% were married couples living together, 7.73% had a female householder with no husband present, and 23.78% were non-families. 16.30% of all households were made up of individuals, and 5.54% had someone living alone who was 65 years of age or older. The average household size was 3.14, and the average family size was 3.55.

The county population contained 36.3% under the age of 20, 12.59% from 20 to 24, 26.97% from 25 to 44, 16.41% from 45 to 64, and 7.72% who were 65 years of age or older. The median age was 25.5 years. For every 100 females, there were 98.84 males. For every 100 females aged 18 and over, there were 99.53 males.

=== Ancestry ===
As of 2016, the largest self-reported ancestry groups in Cache County were:

- 28.3% were of English ancestry
- 11.6% were of German ancestry
- 7.4% were of Danish ancestry
- 5.9% were of American ancestry
- 5.3% were of Swedish ancestry
- 5.1% were of Scottish ancestry
- 4.6% were of Irish ancestry
- 2.9% were of Norwegian ancestry
- 2.7% were of Welsh ancestry
- 2.2% were of Italian ancestry
- 2.2% were of Swiss ancestry
- 1.8% were of French ancestry
- 1.7% were of Dutch ancestry
- 0.8% were of Polish ancestry

== Communities ==
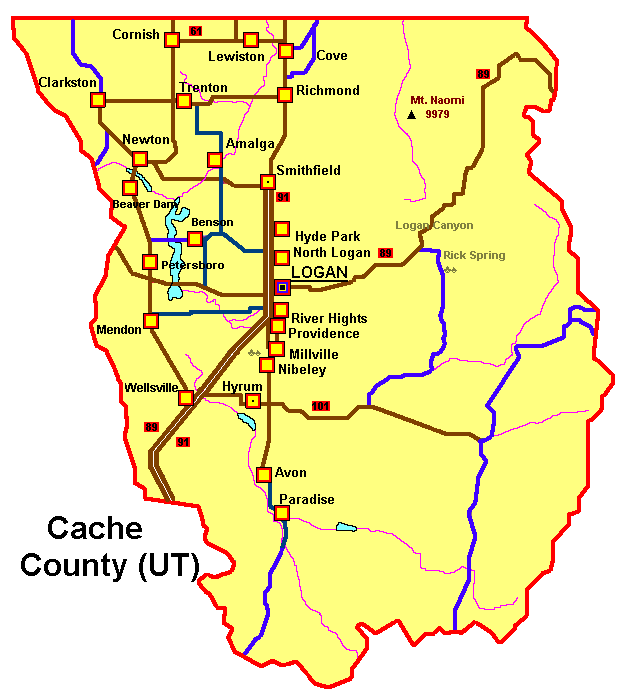
Map of Cache County communities

Cache County has 13 incorporated cities, six incorporated towns, one township, five unincorporated areas, and at least two former communities. Millville was the first area to be incorporated in April 1864. Logan was incorporated on January 17, 1866, with Wellsville incorporated two days later. The most recent area to be incorporated was Amalga in 1938.

Almost every city and area of Cache County has an annual celebration. Millville's "May Day" has been celebrated since 1862, the oldest in the valley. Richmond's "Black & White Days" includes the nation's longest-running dairy show, which started in 1912. The county government celebrates the Cache County Fair and Rodeo. Logan has an average of 24 annual events, including food festivals, historic home tours, and baby animal days.

=== Cities (13) ===
Name	Settled	Incorporated	Population (2020)
Hyde Park	1860	1892	5,234
Hyrum	1860	1870	9,362
Lewiston	1870	1904	1,939
Logan	1859	1866	52,778
Mendon	1859	1870	1,339
Millville	1860	1864	2,222
Nibley	1860	1935	7,328
North Logan	1890	1934	10,986
Providence	1859	1890s	8,218
Richmond	1859	1868	2,733
River Heights	1882	1934	2,144
Smithfield	1859	1868	13,571
Wellsville	1856	1866	4,060

=== Towns (6) ===
Name	Settled	Incorporated	Population (2020)
Amalga	1869	1938	482
Clarkston	1864	1901	749
Cornish	1880s	1937	274
Newton	1869	1869	899
Paradise	1860	1907	971
Trenton	1870	1872	512

=== Townships (1) ===
- College-Young (merger of the unincorporated communities of College Ward and Young Ward)

=== Census-designated places (5) ===
- Avon
- Benson
- Cache (aka Cache Junction)
- Cove
- Peter

=== Former communities (2) ===
- La Plata
- White Horse Village (Christ Brotherhood)

== Education ==
=== School districts ===
- Cache County School District
- Logan City School District

=== Universities ===
- Utah State University (public)
- Bridgerland Technical College (public)

== Notable people ==
- Jawahir Ahmed, model and beauty pageant winner
- Neil L. Andersen, LDS Church apostle born in Logan
- Rocky Anderson, mayor of Salt Lake City 2000–2008
- Michael Ballam, opera singer, founder of Utah Festival Opera Company
- Elaine Bradley, member of Neon Trees rock band
- Hugh B. Brown military officer, politician, LDS Church leader
- Reed Budge, Idaho legislator
- Charles Bullen, politician
- Shay Carl, internet celebrity
- Ron Carlson, novelist and short story writer
- Quentin L. Cook, LDS Church apostle
- Chris Cooley, Washington Redskins football player
- Kevin Curtis, NFL football player
- Marriner Eccles, former chairman of the Federal Reserve Bank
- Luke Falk, football player for Washington State University, New York Jets
- Rulon Gardner, 2000 Olympic gold medalist (Greco-Roman wrestling)
- Hal Garner, football player for the Buffalo Bills
- John Gilbert, silent film star
- Kenny Griffin, Olympic gymnast
- Morris R. Jeppson, weapons test officer, Enola Gay
- Robert M. Kimmitt, former Deputy Secretary of the Treasury, United States Ambassador to Germany
- Russell Maughan, pioneer aviator, first person to fly across America in a single day
- Joseph M. Newman, film director
- Chase Nielsen, member of Doolittle Raid
- Merlin Olsen, football player for Los Angeles Rams, actor and TV personality
- L. Tom Perry, LDS Church apostle
- Casey Robinson, screenwriter and film producer
- Lenore Romney, former First Lady of Michigan, mother of Mitt Romney
- Alan Stauffer, Wyoming legislator, born in Logan
- May Swenson, poet
- Jean Sullivan, actress
- Kip Thorne, astronomer, physicist, 2017 Nobel laureate for the observation of gravitational waves
- John W. Welch, law and religion scholar
- Larry Winborg, illustrator and gallery owner
- Evelyn Wood, speed-reading entrepreneur

== Transportation ==
- Logan–Cache Airport, a general aviation airport in North Logan, serving the Cache Valley region via flight training and charter operations.

== Gallery ==
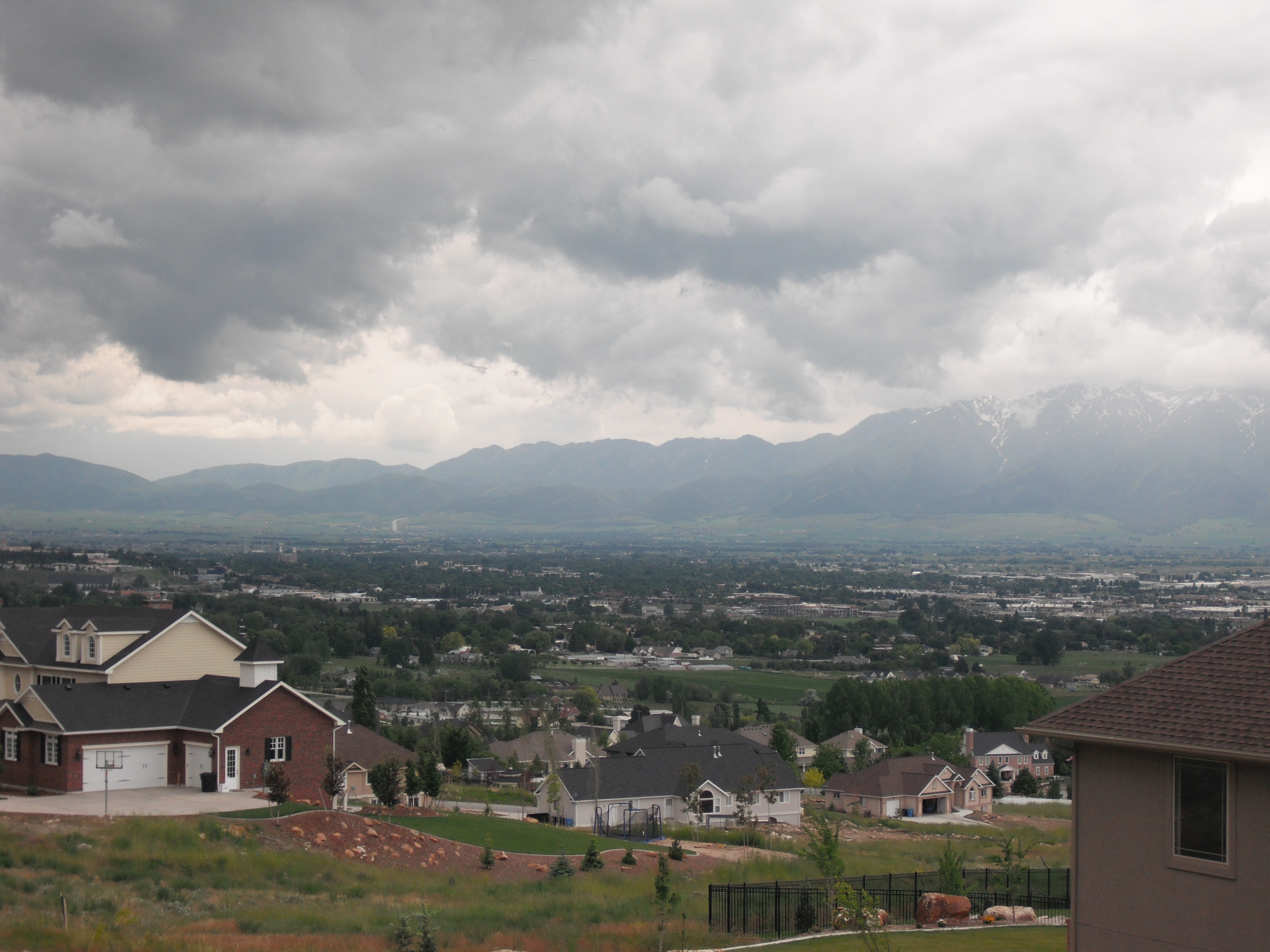
Cache Valley looking south (from North Logan)

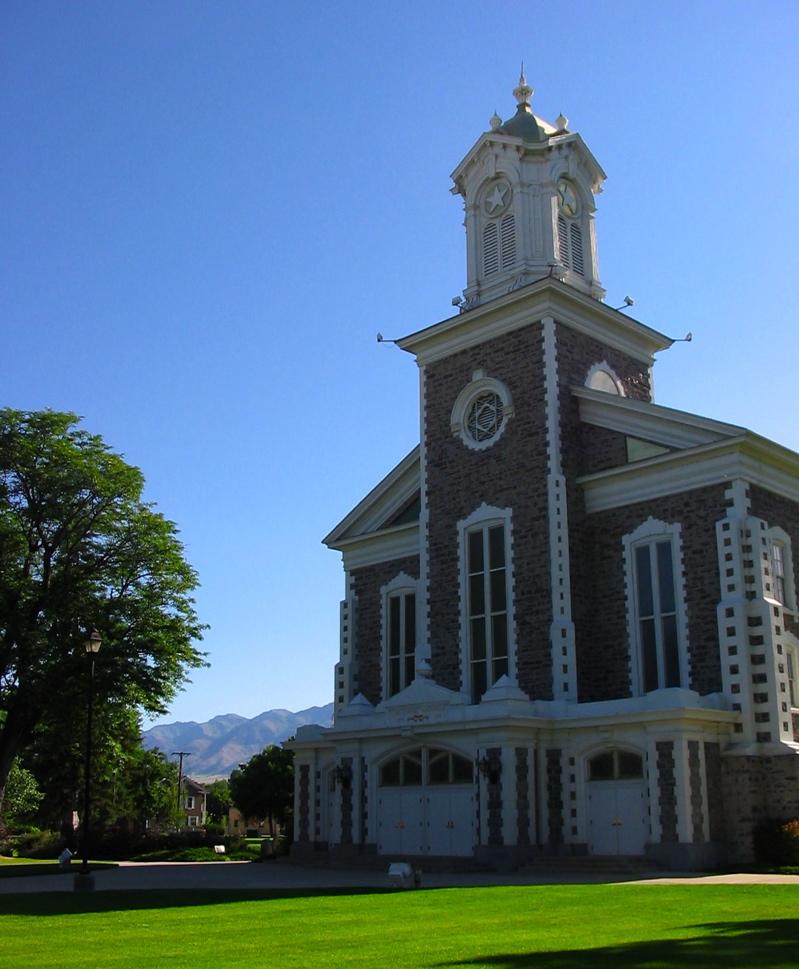
Logan Tabernacle in Logan

== See also ==
- National Register of Historic Places listings in Cache County, Utah
