= Logan metropolitan area =

Human settlement in United States of America

Coordinates: 41°45′00″N 111°50′00″W

Logan, UT–ID Metropolitan Statistical Area
- Metropolitan Statistical Area
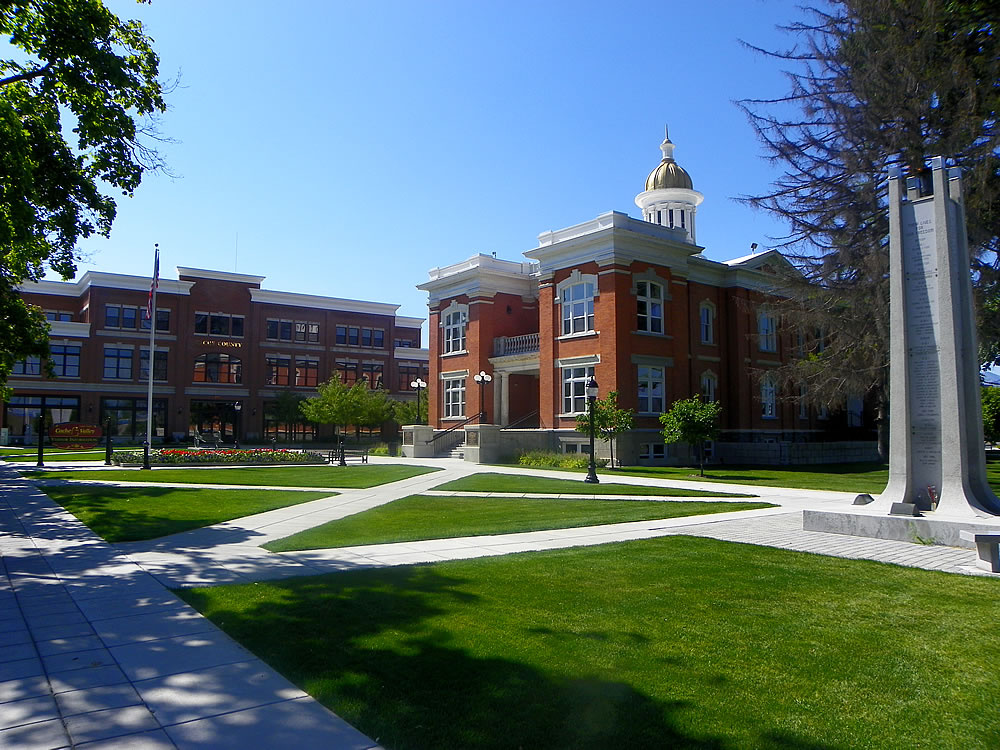
- Downtown Logan, with courthouse
Map of Logan, UT–ID MSA
Logan, UT–ID MSA
- Country: United States
- State: Utah; Idaho
- Largest city: Logan

Area
  - Total: 9,977 sq mi (25,840 km^{2})
- Time zone: UTC−7 (MST)
  - Summer (DST): UTC−6 (MDT)

The Logan Metropolitan Statistical Area, as defined by the United States Census Bureau, consists of two counties – one in Utah and one in Idaho, anchored by the city of Logan. As of the 2010 census, the MSA had a population of 125,442 (the Census Bureau estimate for July 1, 2014 placed the population at 131,364). As of the 2020 Census, the population had risen to 147,908, and further expanded to an estimated 155,362 as of 2022. The Logan metropolitan area is colloquially called Cache Valley, where most of the population resides.

== Counties ==
- Cache County, Utah
- Franklin County, Idaho

== Communities ==
- Amalga, Utah
- Avon, Utah (census-designated place)
- Benson, Utah (census-designated place)
- Cache Junction, Utah (census-designated place)
- Clarkston, Utah
- Clifton, Idaho
- Cornish, Utah
- Cove, Utah (census-designated place)
- Dayton, Idaho
- Franklin, Idaho
- Hyde Park, Utah
- Hyrum, Utah
- Lewiston, Utah
- Logan, Utah (Principal city)
- Mendon, Utah
- Millville, Utah
- Newton, Utah
- Nibley, Utah
- North Logan, Utah
- Oxford, Idaho
- Paradise, Utah
- Petersboro, Utah (census-designated place)
- Preston, Idaho
- Providence, Utah
- Richmond, Utah
- River Heights, Utah
- Smithfield, Utah
- Trenton, Utah
- Wellsville, Utah
- Weston, Idaho
- Whitney, Idaho (unincorporated)

== Demographics ==
Historical population Logan MSA
Census	Pop.	Note	%±
2000	102,720		—
2010	125,442		22.1%
2020	147,908		17.9%
2022 (est.)	155,362		5.0%
U.S. Census Bureau

As of the census of 2000, there were 102,720 people, 31,019 households, and 23,889 families residing within the MSA. The racial makeup of the MSA was 92.54% White, 0.35% African American, 0.55% Native American, 1.78% Asian, 0.18% Pacific Islander, 3.32% from other races, and 1.27% from two or more races. Hispanic or Latino of any race were 6.21% of the population.

The median income for a household in the MSA was $37,896, and the median income for a family was $42,319. Males had a median income of $31,234 versus $21,078 for females. The per capita income for the MSA was $14,398.

== See also ==
- Utah census statistical areas
- Idaho census statistical areas
