= Cache, Utah =

Cache Junction
- CDP
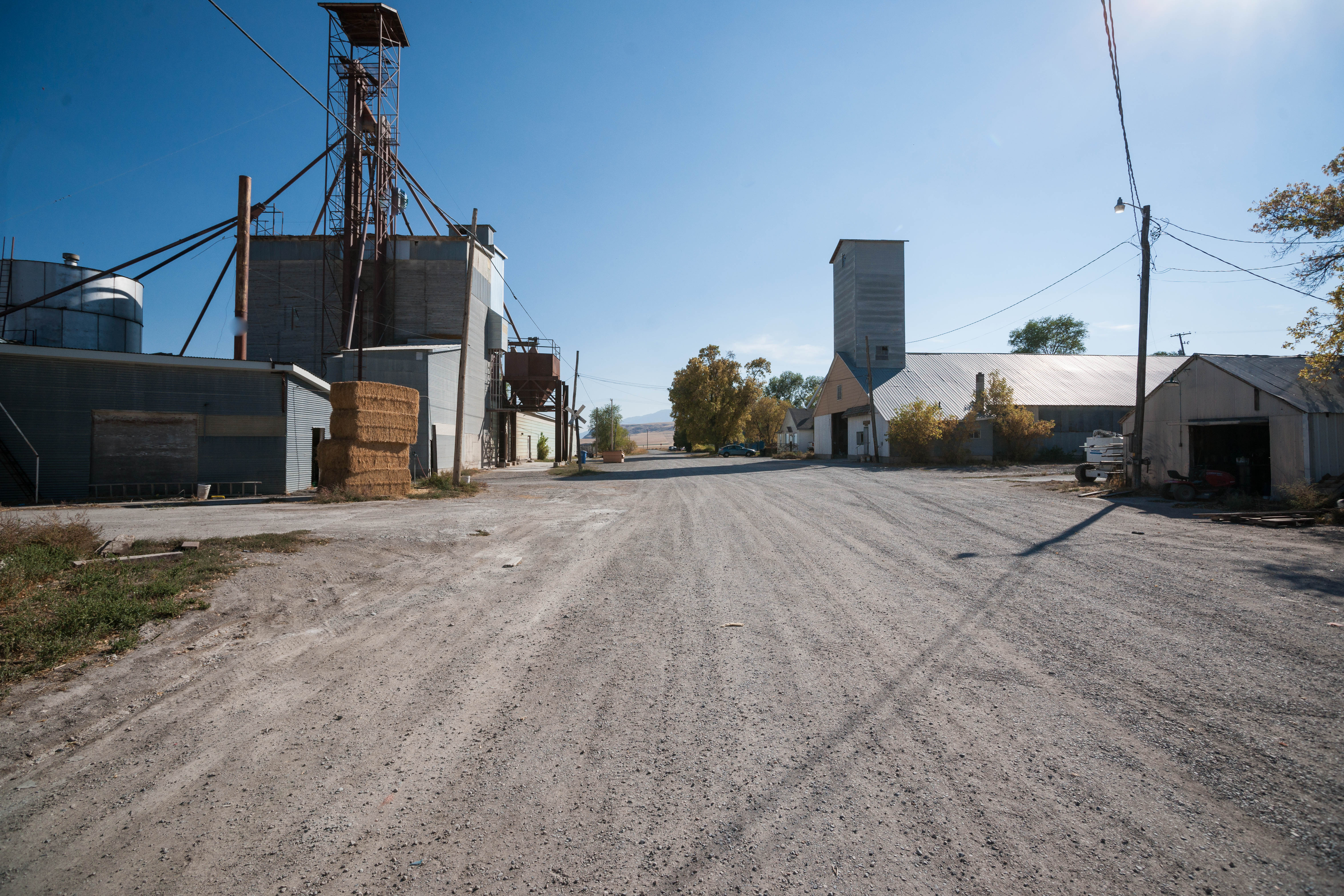

- Location in Cache County and the state of Utah.
- Coordinates: 41°49′40″N 112°00′08″W
- Country: United States
- State: Utah
- County: Cache

Area
  - Total: 6.0 sq mi (15.6 km^{2})
  - Land: 5.7 sq mi (14.7 km^{2})
  - Water: 0.35 sq mi (0.9 km^{2})
- Elevation: 4,459 ft (1,359 m)

Population (2020)
  - Total: 38
  - Density: 6.7/sq mi (2.6/km^{2})
- Time zone: UTC-7 (Mountain (MST))
  - Summer (DST): UTC-6 (MDT)
- GNIS feature ID: 2407937

Cache Junction (pronounced /kæʃ/ KASH) is a census-designated place (CDP) in Cache County, Utah, United States. The population was 38 at the 2020 census. It is included in the Logan, Utah-Idaho (partial) Metropolitan Statistical Area.

== Geography ==
According to the United States Census Bureau, the CDP has a total area of 6.0 square miles (15.6 km^{2}), of which 5.7 square miles (14.7 km^{2}) is land and 0.3 square mile (0.9 km^{2}) (5.82%) is water.

== Demographics ==
Historical population
Census	Pop.	Note	%±
2000	37		—
2010	38		2.7%
2020	38		0.0%

As of the census of 2000, there were 37 people, 13 households, and 10 families residing in the CDP. The population density was 6.5 inhabitants per square mile (2.5/km^{2}). There were 16 housing units at an average density of 2.8 per square mile (1.1/km^{2}). The racial makeup of the CDP was 100.00% White.

There were 13 households, out of which 30.8% had children under the age of 18 living with them, 76.9% were married couples living together, 7.7% had a female householder with no husband present, and 15.4% were non-families. 15.4% of all households were made up of individuals, and none had someone living alone who was 65 years of age or older. The average household size was 2.85 and the average family size was 3.18.

In the CDP, the population was spread out, with 29.7% under the age of 18, 5.4% from 18 to 24, 27.0% from 25 to 44, 29.7% from 45 to 64, and 8.1% who were 65 years of age or older. The median age was 32 years. For every 100 females, there were 117.6 males. For every 100 females age 18 and over, there were 116.7 males.

The median income for a household in the CDP was $52,500, and the median income for a family was $52,500. Males had a median income of $36,250 versus $21,250 for females. The per capita income for the CDP was $27,083. None of the population is below the poverty line.

== See also ==
- List of census-designated places in Utah
