= Cove, Utah =

- Census-designated place
- Location in Cache County and the state of Utah
- Coordinates: 41°57′49″N 111°48′22″W
- Country: United States
- State: Utah
- County: Cache
- Settled: 1863
- Founder: Goudy Hogan

Area
  - Total: 14.6 sq mi (37.8 km^{2})
  - Land: 14.6 sq mi (37.8 km^{2})
  - Water: 0 sq mi (0.0 km^{2})
- Elevation: 4,557 ft (1,389 m)

Population (2020)
  - Total: 494
  - Density: 32/sq mi (12.2/km^{2})
- Time zone: UTC-7 (Mountain (MST))
  - Summer (DST): UTC-6 (MDT)
- ZIP code: 84320
- Area code: 435
- FIPS code: 49-16490
- GNIS feature ID: 1440063

Cove is a census-designated place (CDP) in Cache County, Utah, United States. The population was 494 at the 2020 census. It is included in the Logan, Utah-Idaho Metropolitan Statistical Area.

== Geography ==
According to the United States Census Bureau, the CDP has a total area of 14.6 square miles (37.8 km^{2}), all land.

== Demographics ==
Historical population
Census	Pop.	Note	%±
2000	443		—
2010	460		3.8%
2020	494		7.4%

At the 2000 census there were 433 people, 116 households, and 103 families in the CDP. The population density was 29.5 inhabitants per square mile (11.4/km^{2}). There were 123 housing units at an average density of 8.2/sq mi (3.2/km^{2}). The racial makeup of the CDP was 92.33% White, 0.23% Native American, 0.45% Asian, 3.39% from other races, and 3.61% from two or more races. Hispanic or Latino of any race were 3.39%.

Of the 116 households 57.8% had children under the age of 18 living with them, 85.3% were married couples living together, 0.9% had a female householder with no husband present, and 11.2% were non-families. 10.3% of households were one person and 7.8% were one person aged 65 or older. The average household size was 3.82 and the average family size was 4.15.

The age distribution was 43.6% under the age of 18, 8.1% from 18 to 24, 24.8% from 25 to 44, 14.7% from 45 to 64, and 8.8% 65 or older. The median age was 21 years. For every 100 females, there were 89.3 males. For every 100 females age 18 and over, there were 100.0 males.

The median household income was $50,667 and the median family income was $51,083. Males had a median income of $43,000 versus $31,250 for females. The per capita income for the CDP was $12,316. About 9.5% of families and 15.6% of the population were below the poverty line, including 24.1% of those under age 18 and none of those age 65 or over.

== See also ==
- List of census-designated places in Utah
