= Cornish, Utah =

Town in the state of Utah, United States

- Town
- Location in Cache County and the state of Utah.
- Coordinates: 41°58′18″N 111°57′23″W
- Country: United States
- State: Utah
- County: Cache
- Incorporated: 1937
- Named for: William D. Cornish

Area
  - Total: 5.39 sq mi (13.96 km^{2})
  - Land: 5.39 sq mi (13.96 km^{2})
  - Water: 0.0039 sq mi (0.01 km^{2})
- Elevation: 4,482 ft (1,366 m)

Population (2020)
  - Total: 274
  - Density: 62.5/sq mi (24.15/km^{2})
- Time zone: UTC-7 (Mountain (MST))
  - Summer (DST): UTC-6 (MDT)
- ZIP code: 84308
- Area code: 435
- FIPS code: 49-15940
- GNIS feature ID: 2413244
- Website: www.cornish.utah.gov

Cornish is a town in Cache County, Utah, United States. The population was 274 at the 2020 census. It is included in the Logan, Utah-Idaho (partial) Metropolitan Statistical Area.

== Geography ==
According to the United States Census Bureau, the town has a total area of 4.8 square miles (12.6 km^{2}), of which 4.8 square miles (12.5 km^{2}) is land and 0.21% is water.

== History ==
Cornish emerged as a town on the Oregon Short Line Railroad. It was formed into a separate ward in 1907.

== Demographics ==
Historical population
Census	Pop.	Note	%±
1910	146		—
1920	376		157.5%
1930	384		2.1%
1940	221		−42.4%
1950	181		−18.1%
1960	157		−13.3%
1970	173		10.2%
1980	181		4.6%
1990	205		13.3%
2000	259		26.3%
2010	288		11.2%
2020	274		−4.9%
U.S. Decennial Census

As of the census of 2000, there were 259 people, 73 households, and 61 families residing in the town. The population density was 53.5 inhabitants per square mile (20.7/km^{2}). There were 76 housing units at an average density of 15.7 per square mile (6.1/km^{2}). The racial makeup of the town was 97.68% White, 0.77% Asian, 0.39% from other races, and 1.16% from two or more races. Hispanic or Latino of any race were 2.32% of the population.

There were 73 households, out of which 52.1% had children under the age of 18 living with them, 75.3% were married couples living together, 8.2% had a female householder with no husband present, and 15.1% were non-families. 9.6% of all households were made up of individuals, and 5.5% had someone living alone who was 65 years or older. The average household size was 3.55, and the average family size was 3.84.

In the town, the population was spread out, with 39.0% under 18, 13.1% from 18 to 24, 25.1% from 25 to 44, 15.4% from 45 to 64, and 7.3% who were 65 years of age or older. The median age was 24 years. For every 100 females, there were 90.4 males. For every 100 females aged 18 and over, there were 85.9 males.

The median income for a household in the town was $40,417, and the median income for a family was $42,292. Males had a median income of $33,571 versus $21,875 for females. The per capita income for the town was $15,287. About 7.0% of families and 12.9% of the population were below the poverty line, including 17.5% of those under eighteen and none of those 65 or over.

== See also ==
- List of cities and towns in Utah
