= Peter, Utah =

- Census-designated place
- Location in Cache County and the state of Utah
- Coordinates: 41°45′30″N 112°00′20″W
- Country: United States
- State: Utah
- County: Cache
- Settled: 1867
- Founder: Sylvanus Collett
- Named for: Peter Maughan

Area
  - Total: 22.4 sq mi (58.0 km^{2})
  - Land: 21.5 sq mi (55.8 km^{2})
  - Water: 0.85 sq mi (2.2 km^{2})
- Elevation: 4,479 ft (1,365 m)

Population (2020)
  - Total: 623
  - Density: 28.9/sq mi (11.2/km^{2})
- Time zone: UTC-7 (Mountain (MST))
  - Summer (DST): UTC-6 (MDT)
- ZIP code: 84325
- Area code: 435
- GNIS feature ID: 2409057

Peter also known as Petersboro is a census-designated place (CDP) on the west-central edge of Cache County, Utah, United States. The population was 623 at the 2020 census. It is included in the Logan, Utah-Idaho (partial) Metropolitan Statistical Area.

== Geography ==
According to the United States Census Bureau, the CDP has a total area of 22.4 square miles (58.0 km^{2}), of which 21.5 square miles (55.8 km^{2}) is land and 0.9 square mile (2.2 km^{2}) (3.84%) is water.

== History ==
Sylvanus Collett became the first settler in Petersboro in 1867. In 1876 Petersboro was designated District Six within the Mendon LDS Ward. Petersboro became a separate ward in 1887.

The area is named for Peter Maughan, an early Mormon settler and church leader. Located outside of Mendon, historically the area has been closely tied with the cultural and religious communities located in the nearby town. Each year residents of Petersboro participate with Mendonites in their May Day celebration.

== Demographics ==
Historical population
Census	Pop.	Note	%±
1880	76		—
1890	337		343.4%
1900	166		−50.7%
1910	222		33.7%
1920	320		44.1%
1930	233		−27.2%
1940	180		−22.7%
1950	150		−16.7%
2000	230		—
2010	324		40.9%
2020	623		92.3%

As of the census of 2000, there were 230 people, 69 households, and 60 families residing in the CDP. The population density was 10.7 inhabitants per square mile (4.1/km^{2}). There were 71 housing units at an average density of 3.3 per square mile (1.3/km^{2}). The racial makeup of the CDP was 100.00% White. Hispanic or Latino of any race were 1.74% of the population.

There were 69 households, out of which 52.2% had children under the age of 18 living with them, 71.0% were married couples living together, 7.2% had a female householder with no husband present, and 13.0% were non-families. 11.6% of all households were made up of individuals, and 4.3% had someone living alone who was 65 years of age or older. The average household size was 3.33 and the average family size was 3.62.

In the CDP, the population was spread out, with 38.7% under the age of 18, 7.0% from 18 to 24, 23.5% from 25 to 44, 20.9% from 45 to 64, and 10.0% who were 65 years of age or older. The median age was 32 years. For every 100 females, there were 111.0 males. For every 100 females age 18 and over, there were 107.4 males.

The median income for a household in the CDP was $61,250, and the median income for a family was $66,250. Males had a median income of $51,964 versus $28,750 for females. The per capita income for the CDP was $17,850. None of the population or families were below the poverty line.

== See also ==
- List of census-designated places in Utah
