= Clarkston, Utah =

Town in Utah, United States

- Town
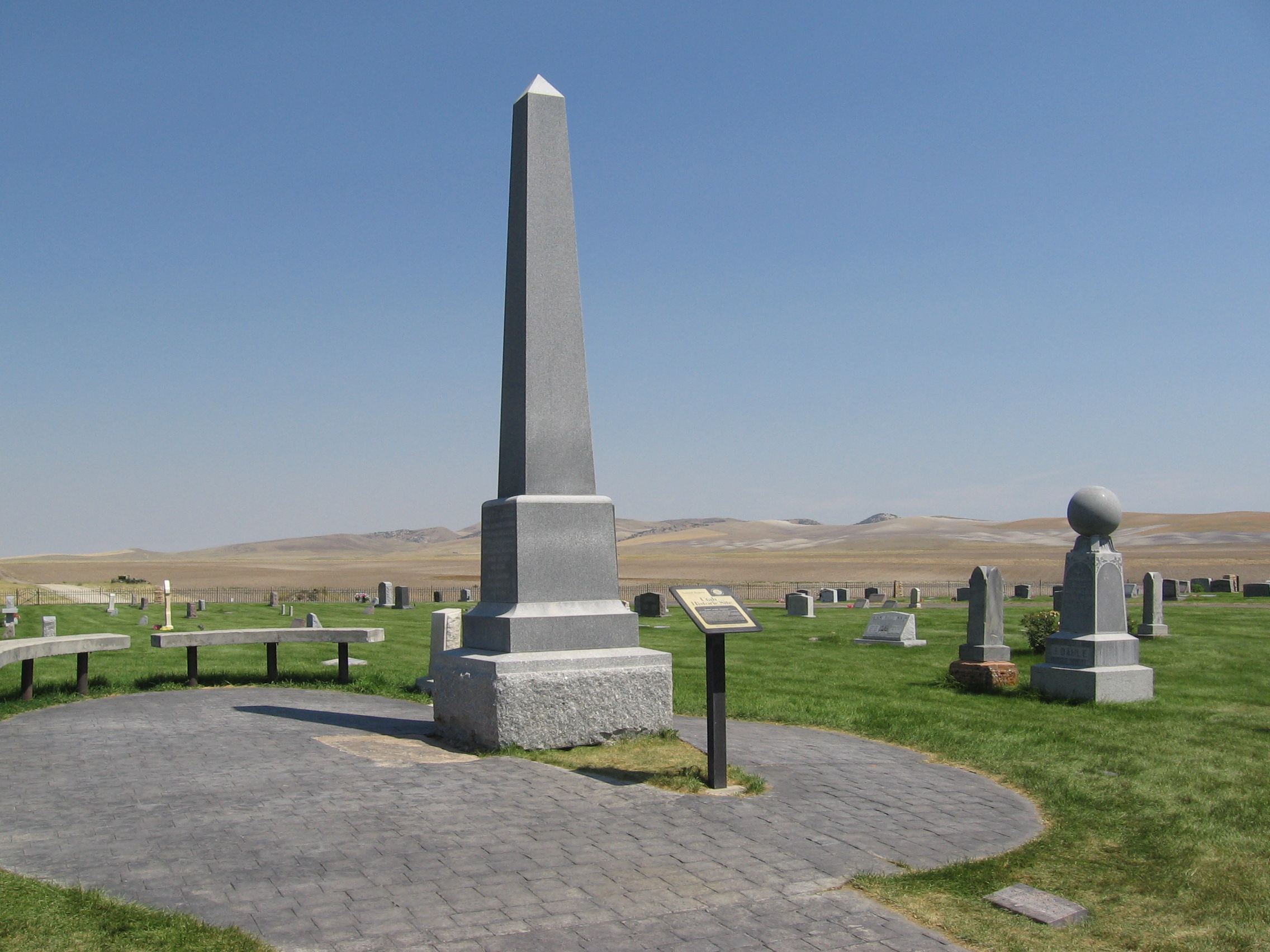
- The Martin Harris Gravesite in Clarkston is listed on the National Register of Historic Places

- Location in Cache County and the state of Utah.
- Coordinates: 41°55′14″N 112°03′01″W
- Country: United States
- State: Utah
- County: Cache
- Founded: 1864
- Named for: Israel Justus Clark

Area
  - Total: 0.93 sq mi (2.40 km^{2})
  - Land: 0.93 sq mi (2.40 km^{2})
  - Water: 0 sq mi (0.00 km^{2})
- Elevation: 4,882 ft (1,488 m)

Population (2020)
  - Total: 749
  - Density: 797.7/sq mi (307.98/km^{2})
- Time zone: UTC-7 (Mountain (MST))
  - Summer (DST): UTC-6 (MDT)
- ZIP code: 84305
- Area code: 435
- FIPS code: 49-13190
- GNIS feature ID: 2413207
- Website: clarkstonutah.gov

Clarkston is a town in Cache County, Utah, United States. The population was 749 at the 2020 census. It is included in the Logan, Utah-Idaho Metropolitan Statistical Area. The community celebration is held in June each year and is known as The Pony Express Days.

Clarkston is noted for being the last home of Martin Harris, one of the Three Witnesses of the Book of Mormon. He is buried in Clarkston, and every other year a pageant commemorates his life. The pageant was discontinued in 2018.

Notable local wildlife includes mule deer, sharp-tailed grouse, and pheasant.

== History ==
The town of Clarkston was laid out in 1864. It was named for Israel Justus Clark, who was an early settler and the first branch president of the Church of Jesus Christ of Latter-day Saints in Clarkston. The settlers originally settled east of modern-day Clarkston in a spot known as the flat. Due to water quality concerns and sickness, they moved the town to a higher elevation and closer to City Creek and other springs. They also experimented in dry farming, mainly north of town. There was trouble with the native Americans, and in 1866 the settlement was abandoned for a short time. Eventually, an agreement was made between the settlers and Indian John, a chief under the Washakie. A Latter-day Saint ward was organized in Clarkston in the fall of 1867 with William F. Rigby as bishop. A brick meetinghouse was built in 1910. In 1930 Clarkston had a population of 570. Among the first settlers were Israel J. Clark, James Myler, William Ricks, Michael Poulsen, Johannis Dahle, Gideon Harmison, David Cook, John Griffiths, John Griffin, John Godfrey, Samuel Whitney, Ole S. Jensen and their families; also the Thompson and Hansen families, A. W. Heggie, a Mr. Parker, Paul Paulson, Andrew McCombs, Simon Smith, Isaac Cook, A. H. Atkinson, and others. The existence of the Clarkston settlement was threatened in 1869 when a majority of the settlers, due mainly to discouragement because of the severe winters and heavy drifting snow, decided to move to the present site of Newton, Utah. But a few people decided to stay in Clarkston, and some who had left returned, and the settlement became a permanent one. There was a controversy over retaining the name Clarkston for the original settlement or transferring it to the "New Town."

== Geography ==
According to the United States Census Bureau, the town has a total area of 1 square mile (2.6 km^{2}), all land. High above Clarkston rises Gunsight Peak, at an elevation of 8244 feet. Clarkston averages 219 sunny days a year. The average rainfall is 18 inches a year, with an average snowfall of 62 inches per year.

== Demographics ==
Historical population
Census	Pop.	Note	%±
1870	153		—
1880	464		203.3%
1890	440		−5.2%
1900	475		8.0%
1910	564		18.7%
1920	528		−6.4%
1930	570		8.0%
1940	579		1.6%
1950	526		−9.2%
1960	490		−6.8%
1970	420		−14.3%
1980	562		33.8%
1990	645		14.8%
2000	688		6.7%
2010	666		−3.2%
2020	749		12.5%
U.S. Decennial Census

As of the census of 2000, there were 688 people, 206 households, and 172 families residing in the town. The population density was 718.0 inhabitants per square mile (277.2/km^{2}). There were 219 housing units at an average density of 228.6 per square mile (88.3/km^{2}). The racial makeup of the town was 95.78% White, 0.29% Native American, 1.60% from other races, and 2.33% from two or more races. Hispanic or Latino of any race were 2.18% of the population.

There were 206 households, out of which 47.1% had children under the age of 18 living with them, 76.7% were married couples living together, 4.9% had a female householder with no husband present, and 16.5% were non-families. 16.0% of all households were made up of individuals, and 9.2% had someone living alone who was 65 years of age or older. The average household size was 3.34, and the average family size was 3.78.

In the town, the population was spread out, with 35.5% under 18, 10.9% from 18 to 24, 23.4% from 25 to 44, 19.8% from 45 to 64, and 10.5% who were 65 years of age or older. The median age was 28 years. For every 100 females, there were 108.5 males. For every 100 females aged 18 and over, there were 100.9 males.

The median income for a household in the town was $40,592, and the median income for a family was $42,171. Males had a median income of $32,344 versus $20,000 for females. The per capita income for the town was $13,626. None of the families and 0.7% of the population lived below the poverty line, including no under eighteens and 7.2% of those over 64.

== Notable people ==
- Martin Harris, witness to the Book of Mormon who traveled to Utah in 1870
- William Williams Henderson, educator
- LaFarr Stuart, computer music pioneer
