= Newton, Utah =

Town in the state of Utah, United States

- Town
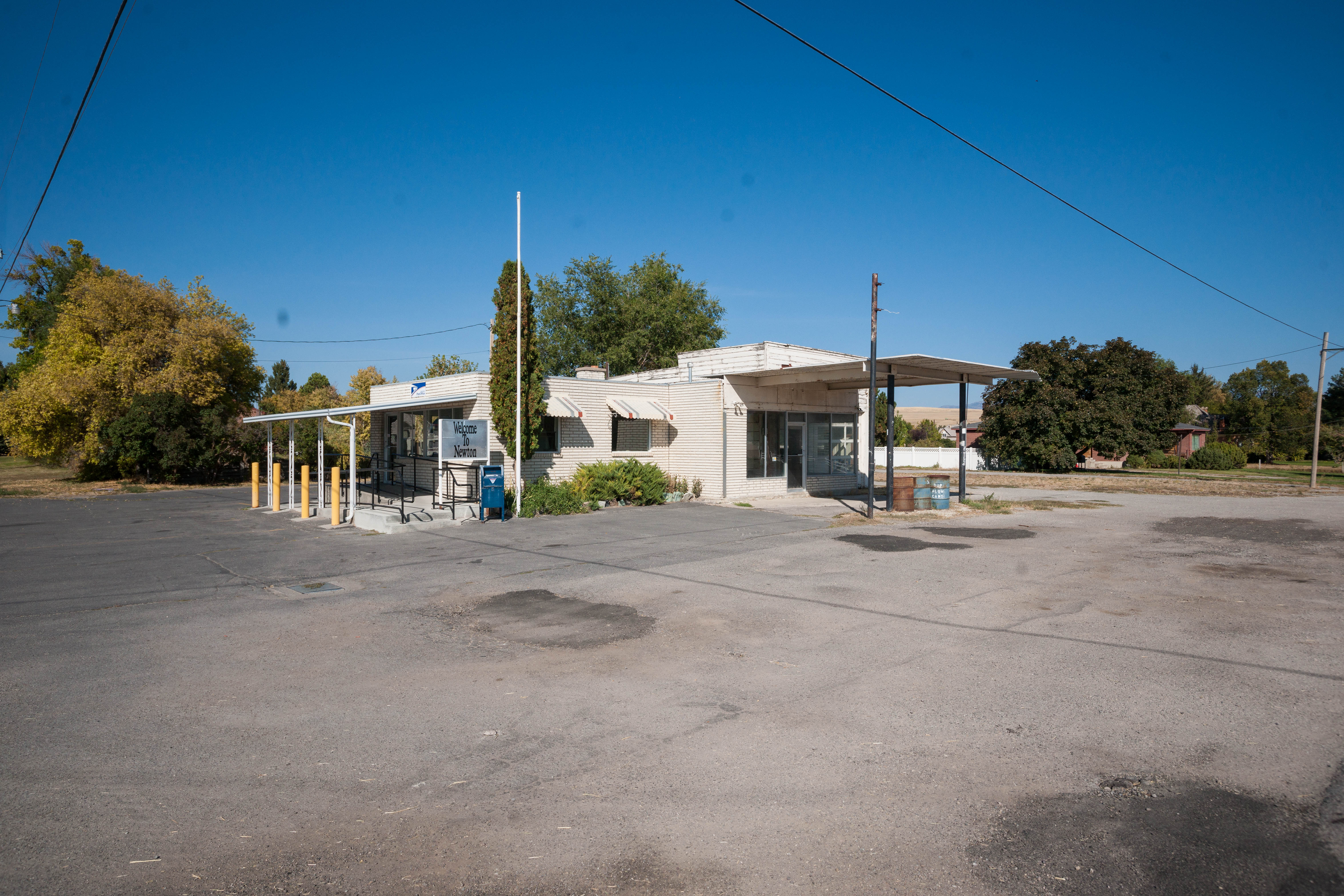
- Newton Post Office, September 2012

- Location in Cache County and the state of Utah.
- Coordinates: 41°51′38″N 111°59′45″W
- Country: United States
- State: Utah
- County: Cache
- Named for: 'New Town' separate from Clarkston

Government
  - Mayor: Craig Rigby

Area
  - Total: 0.86 sq mi (2.22 km^{2})
  - Land: 0.86 sq mi (2.22 km^{2})
  - Water: 0 sq mi (0.00 km^{2})
- Elevation: 4,528 ft (1,380 m)

Population (2020)
  - Total: 789
  - Density: 952.8/sq mi (367.87/km^{2})
- Time zone: UTC-7 (Mountain (MST))
  - Summer (DST): UTC-6 (MDT)
- ZIP code: 84327
- Area code: 435
- FIPS code: 49-54550
- GNIS feature ID: 2413048
- Website: www.newtonutah.gov

Newton is a town in Cache County, Utah, United States. It was founded in 1869 by pioneers of the Church of Jesus Christ of Latter-day Saints. The population was 899 at the 2020 census. It is included in the Logan, Utah-Idaho Metropolitan Statistical Area.

== Geography ==
According to the United States Census Bureau, the town has a total area of 0.8 square mile (2.0 km^{2}), all land.

== History ==
Newton was first settled in 1869. A bridge was built over the Bear River in 1871 and it was at that point that many of the inhabitants of Clarkston, Utah moved to this "new town". Newton has two reservoirs nearby: Newton Dam reservoir to the north, and the much larger Cutler Reservoir to the south.

== Demographics ==
Historical population
Census	Pop.	Note	%±
1870	195		—
1880	304		55.9%
1890	473		55.6%
1900	429		−9.3%
1910	515		20.0%
1920	529		2.7%
1930	555		4.9%
1940	549		−1.1%
1950	497		−9.5%
1960	480		−3.4%
1970	444		−7.5%
1980	623		40.3%
1990	659		5.8%
2000	699		6.1%
2010	789		12.9%
2020	789		0.0%
U.S. Decennial Census

As of the census of 2000, there were 699 people, 196 households, and 165 families residing in the town. The population density was 915.2 inhabitants per square mile (353.4/km^{2}). There were 204 housing units at an average density of 267.1 per square mile (103.1/km^{2}). The racial makeup of the town was 96.57% White, 2.29% Asian, 0.72% from other races, and 0.43% from two or more races. Hispanic or Latino of any race were 2.43% of the population.

There were 196 households, out of which 53.1% had children under the age of 18 living with them, 77.6% were married couples living together, 4.1% had a female householder with no husband present, and 15.8% were non-families. 13.3% of all households were made up of individuals, and 7.7% had someone living alone who was 65 years of age or older. The average household size was 3.57 and the average family size was 4.02.

In the town, the population was spread out, with 36.8% under the age of 18, 12.6% from 18 to 24, 22.0% from 25 to 44, 20.6% from 45 to 64, and 8.0% who were 65 years of age or older. The median age was 26 years. For every 100 females, there were 105.6 males. For every 100 females age 18 and over, there were 106.5 males.

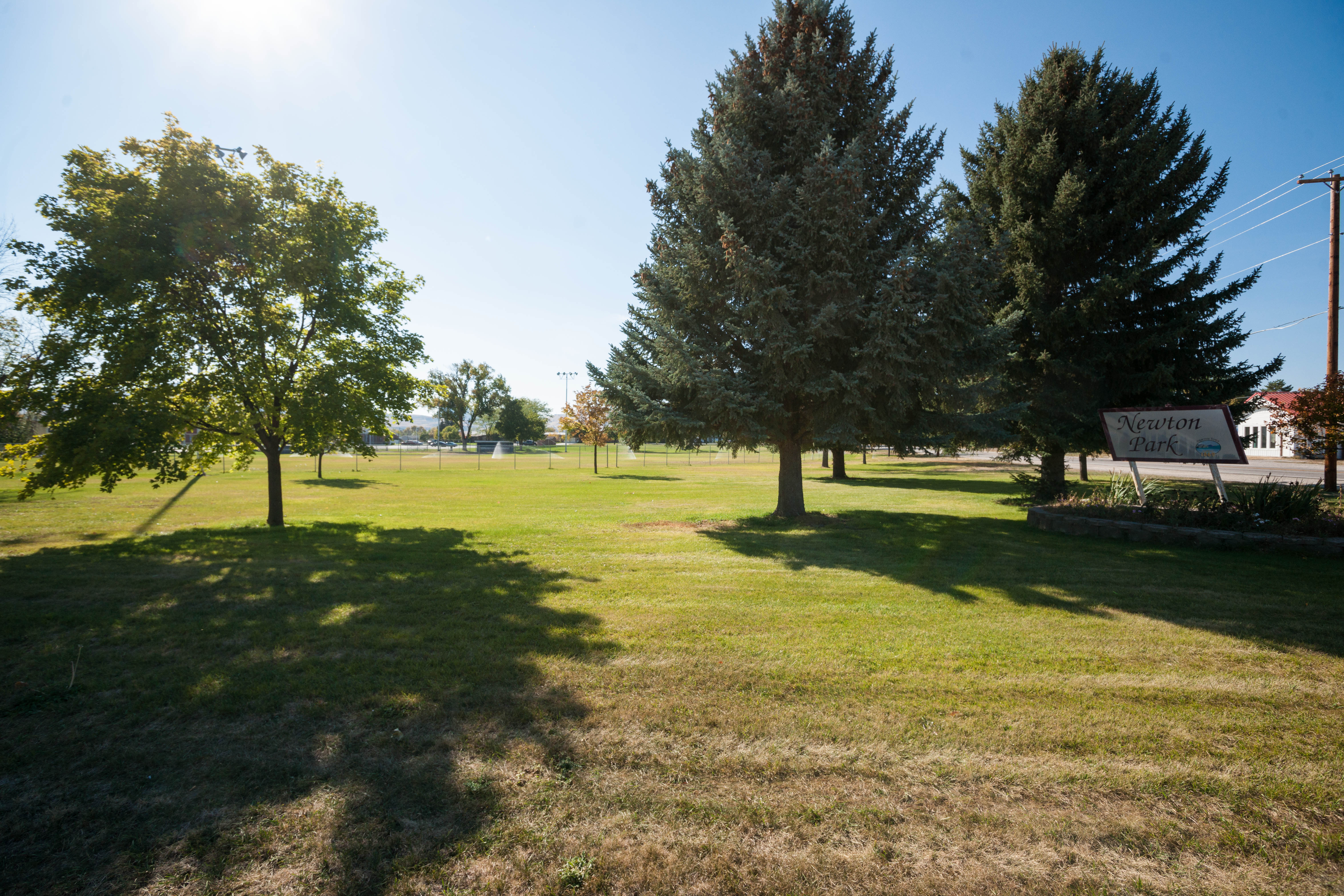
Park in Newton, September 2012

The median income for a household in the town was $45,000, and the median income for a family was $47,875. Males had a median income of $31,957 versus $21,500 for females. The per capita income for the town was $13,146. None of the families and 0.7% of the population were living below the poverty line, including no under eighteens and 3.5% of those over 64.

== Notable people ==
- Parley P. Christensen, Los Angeles city council member
- Orrin Hatch, politician, buried in Newton

== See also ==
- List of municipalities in Utah
