= Lewiston, Utah =

City in Utah, United States

- City
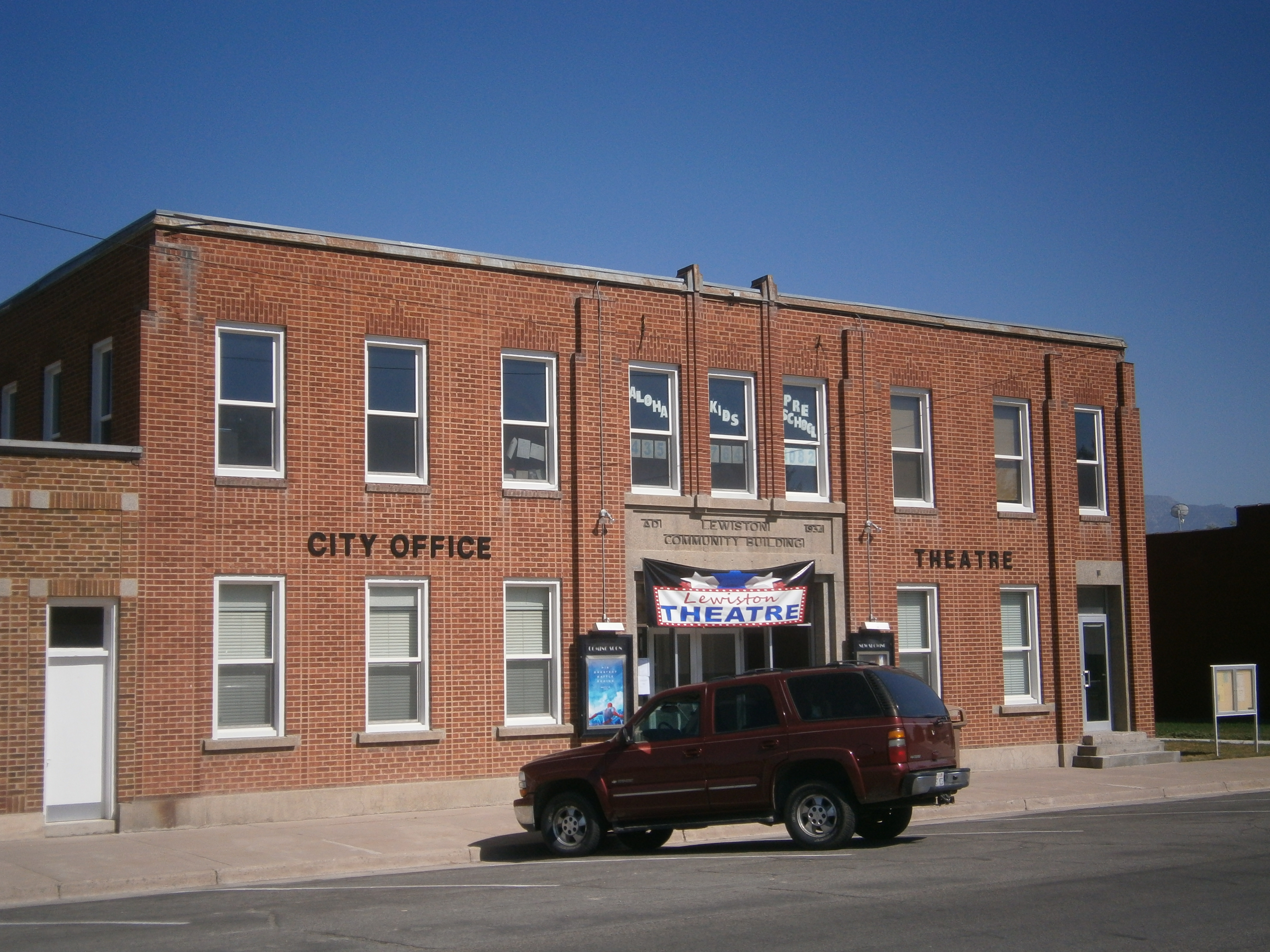
- The Lewiston Community Building, built in 1935, is listed on the National Register of Historic Places.

- Location in Cache County and the state of Utah
- Coordinates: 41°57′42″N 111°51′50″W
- Country: United States
- State: Utah
- County: Cache
- Settled: 1870
- Named for: William H. Lewis

Area
  - Total: 25.90 sq mi (67.09 km^{2})
  - Land: 25.84 sq mi (66.93 km^{2})
  - Water: 0.062 sq mi (0.16 km^{2})
- Elevation: 4,505 ft (1,373 m)

Population (2020)
  - Total: 1,939
  - Density: 69.6/sq mi (26.86/km^{2})
- Time zone: UTC-7 (Mountain (MST))
  - Summer (DST): UTC-6 (MDT)
- ZIP code: 84320
- Area code: 435
- FIPS code: 49-44760
- GNIS feature ID: 2410826
- Website: Official website

Lewiston is a city in Cache County, Utah, United States.

The city is one of the most northern in Utah, bordering the state of Idaho. The population was 1,939 at the 2020 census, and Lewiston is included in the Logan, Utah-Idaho (partial) Metropolitan Statistical Area.

== Geography ==
According to the United States Census Bureau, the city has a total area of 25.7 square miles (66.5 km^{2}), of which 25.6 square miles (66.2 km^{2}) is land and 0.1 square mile (0.3 km^{2}) (0.43%) is water.

=== Climate ===
This climatic region is typified by large seasonal temperature differences, with warm to hot (and often humid) summers and cold (sometimes severely cold) winters. According to the Köppen Climate Classification system, Lewiston has a humid continental climate, abbreviated "Dfb" on climate maps.

== Demographics ==
Historical population
| Census | Pop. | Note | %± |
|---|---|---|---|
| 1880 | 525 | | — |
| 1890 | 754 | | 43.6% |
| 1900 | 995 | | 32.0% |
| 1910 | 989 | | −0.6% |
| 1920 | 1,646 | | 66.4% |
| 1930 | 1,783 | | 8.3% |
| 1940 | 1,804 | | 1.2% |
| 1950 | 1,533 | | −15.0% |
| 1960 | 1,336 | | −12.9% |
| 1970 | 1,244 | | −6.9% |
| 1980 | 1,438 | | 15.6% |
| 1990 | 1,532 | | 6.5% |
| 2000 | 1,877 | | 22.5% |
| 2010 | 1,766 | | −5.9% |
| 2020 | 1,939 | | 9.8% |
U.S. Decennial Census

=== 2020 census ===
As of the 2020 census, Lewiston had a population of 1,939. The median age was 30.9 years, with 32.5% of residents under the age of 18 and 12.9% aged 65 years or older. For every 100 females there were 105.0 males and for every 100 females age 18 and over there were 106.1 males age 18 and over.

0.0% of residents lived in urban areas, while 100.0% lived in rural areas.

There were 603 households in Lewiston, of which 45.3% had children under the age of 18 living in them; 70.8% were married-couple households, 12.9% were households with a male householder and no spouse or partner present, and 13.6% were households with a female householder and no spouse or partner present. About 16.3% of all households were made up of individuals and 8.3% had someone living alone who was 65 years of age or older.

There were 628 housing units, of which 4.0% were vacant; the homeowner vacancy rate was 0.4% and the rental vacancy rate was 0.0%.

Racial composition as of the 2020 census
| Race | Number | Percent |
|---|---|---|
| White | 1,652 | 85.2% |
| Black or African American | 5 | 0.3% |
| American Indian and Alaska Native | 17 | 0.9% |
| Asian | 7 | 0.4% |
| Native Hawaiian and Other Pacific Islander | 5 | 0.3% |
| Some other race | 173 | 8.9% |
| Two or more races | 80 | 4.1% |
| Hispanic or Latino (of any race) | 249 | 12.8% |

=== 2000 census ===
As of the 2000 census, there were 1,877 people, 531 households, and 446 families residing in the city. The population density was 73.4 inhabitants per square mile (28.3/km^{2}). There were 558 housing units at an average density of 21.8 per square mile (8.4/km^{2}). The racial makeup of the city was 94.67% White, 0.11% African American, 0.05% Native American, 0.11% Asian, 3.68% from other races, and 1.39% from two or more races. Hispanic or Latino of any race were 6.29% of the population.

There were 531 households, out of which 53.3% had children under the age of 18 living with them, 75.0% were married couples living together, 6.8% had a female householder with no husband present, and 16.0% were non-families. 14.3% of all households were made up of individuals, and 7.3% had someone living alone who was 65 years of age or older. The average household size was 3.53 and the average family size was 3.94.

In the city, the population was spread out, with 39.4% under the age of 18, 12.3% from 18 to 24, 24.7% from 25 to 44, 14.5% from 45 to 64, and 9.1% who were 65 years of age or older. The median age was 24 years. For every 100 females, there were 101.2 males. For every 100 females age 18 and over, there were 94.9 males.

The median income for a household in the city was $36,417, and the median income for a family was $41,705. Males had a median income of $28,750 versus $22,083 for females. The per capita income for the city was $12,385. About 8.7% of families and 10.2% of the population were below the poverty line, including 12.2% of those under age 18 and 9.0% of those age 65 or over.

== Notable people ==
- Glen Laird Taggart, 11th president of Utah State University.

== See also ==
- List of cities and towns in Utah
- Amalgamated Sugar Company
