= Utah State Route 101 =

Highway in Utah, United States

State Route 101

Route information
- Maintained by UDOT
- Length: 21.811 mi (35.101 km)
- Existed: 1931–present

Major junctions
- West end: SR-23 in Wellsville
- US 89 / US 91 in Wellsville; SR-165 near Hyrum
- East end: Hardware Ranch trail head

Location
- Country: United States
- State: Utah
- Counties: Cache

Highway system
- Utah State Highway System; Interstate; US; State; Minor; Scenic
← SR-100	→ SR-102

State Route 101 (SR-101) is a 21.811-mile (35.101 km) long state highway located in the U.S. state of Utah. The route serves as a spur route into the Uinta-Wasatch-Cache National Forest through the cities of Wellsville and Hyrum, with an intermediate intersection with U.S. Route 89 (US-89) and US-91. SR-101 starts at an intersection of Main Street and SR-23 (Center Street) in Wellsville. Heading generally eastward, the highway terminates at the Hardware Ranch Wildlife Management Area. SR-101 was first designated in 1931 as a loop off SR-1 from Logan, south to Hyrum, and west to Wellsville.

== Route description ==
Located entirely in Cache County, SR-101 starts at an intersection of Main Street and SR-23 (Center Street) in Wellsville. The highway heads easterly for the first 0.4 mi (0.64 km) before it turns northeasterly, crossing the Little Bear River and intersects US-89/US-91 at a traffic light controlled at-grade interchange. After the interchange, SR-101 turns to the southeast after entering Hyrum city limits. At 400 West, SR-101 turns south for 3 blocks before turning back to the east, and intersecting SR-165.

After leaving Hyrum, SR-101 dips to the southeast again, entering the Uinta-Wasatch-Cache National Forest and a canyon formed by the Blacksmith Fork River. The final 13.9 mi (22.4 km) are inside the forest, serving as an access route to several campgrounds, as well as a diversion dam, and electric plant. The route comes to an end at the Hardware Ranch Wildlife Management Area, a working ranch owned and run by the state of Utah.

For the year 2007, a daily average of 5,075 cars traveled along SR-101 at the intersection with US-89/US-91. This represents only a slight growth from previous years (in 2006, the average was 5,005; in 2005, 4,620). Nineteen percent of this traffic was composed of trucks. The lowest amount of traffic is accounted for on the final stretch of the highway through the Uinta-Wasatch-Cache National Forest, with an average of 670 cars per day traveling to the Hardware Ranch visitors center. This represents a small increase from previous years, with an average of 635 cars per day in 2006 and 585 cars per day in 2005 traveling to the visitors center.

== History ==
SR-101 was formed in 1931 as a loop off SR-1 (now US-91) from Logan south to Hyrum and west to Wellsville. The road from Hyrum east to the Hardware Ranch was added to the state highway system in 1949 as State Route 242, and that route was extended south to SR-39 in 1965. The legislature redefined the Hyrum-area routes in 1969, taking SR-101 east from Wellsville to the Hardware Ranch over former SR-242, and returning the extension to SR-39 to local control. The leg of former SR-101 from Hyrum north to Logan became part of a new SR-165 at that time. On March 17, 1972, the roadway connecting the Hardware Ranch Visitors Center to SR-101 was added to the state route system as an addition to SR-101. The connector road was previously designated Collector Road 311.

== Major intersections ==
The entire route is in Cache County.

Location	mi	km	Destinations	Notes
Wellsville	0.000	0.000	SR-23 – Mendon	Western terminus
Wellsville	1.205	1.939	US 89 / US 91 to I-15 / I-84 – Brigham City, Logan	
Hyrum	5.927	9.539	SR-165 – Paradise, Providence	
	21.811	35.101	Hardware Ranch trail head	Eastern terminus
1.000 mi = 1.609 km; 1.000 km = 0.621 mi
