= Utah State Route 165 =

State highway in Utah, United States

State Route 165

Route information
- Maintained by UDOT
- Length: 10.722 mi (17.255 km)
- Existed: 1969 (south of Hyrum as SR-163 in 1933)–present

Major junctions
- South end: Intersection of Bridger Blvd and 9100 South in Paradise
- North end: US 91 / US 89 in Logan

Location
- Country: United States
- State: Utah

Highway system
- Utah State Highway System; Interstate; US; State; Minor; Scenic
← SR-164	→ SR-167

State Route 165 is a state highway in the U.S. state of Utah. Spanning 10.7 miles (17.2 km) in Cache County, it connects the towns of Paradise, Hyrum, and Nibley with the city of Logan to the north.

== Route description ==
The route's southern end is in the town of Paradise in the southeast corner of the Cache Valley. Starting in the center of the town at the intersection of Bridger Boulevard and 9100 South, the route travels west for two blocks before turning north along 200 West. The route leaves Paradise, continuing in a northerly direction along the eastern part of the valley, passing through the city of Hyrum as 800 West, through the city of Nibley as Nibley Road, before merging with US-89/US-91 as Main Street just south of the center of Logan, the county seat and largest city in Cache County.

== History ==
The road from Avon through Paradise to Hyrum, was added to the state highway system in 1933 as State Route 163. In 1965, State Route 162 was extended north from Liberty to Avon, ending at the southern terminus of SR-163. SR-162 absorbed SR-163 the following year, in order to maintain continuity in the state highway system. In 1969, SR-162's northern end was moved back south to Liberty. In the process, the road from Liberty to Paradise was removed from the state highway system, and the road from Paradise to Hyrum was re-designated as part of State Route 165, along with added roadway from Hyrum to Logan. The route has remained unchanged since.

== Major intersections ==
The entire route is in Cache County.

Location	mi	km	Destinations	Notes
Paradise	0.000	0.000	Bridger Boulevard	Southern terminus
Hyrum	4.921	7.920	SR-101 (Main Street)	
Logan	10.722	17.255	US 91 / US 89	Northern terminus
1.000 mi = 1.609 km; 1.000 km = 0.621 mi
