= Hyrum First Ward Meetinghouse =

Historic church in Utah, United States

- U.S. National Register of Historic Places
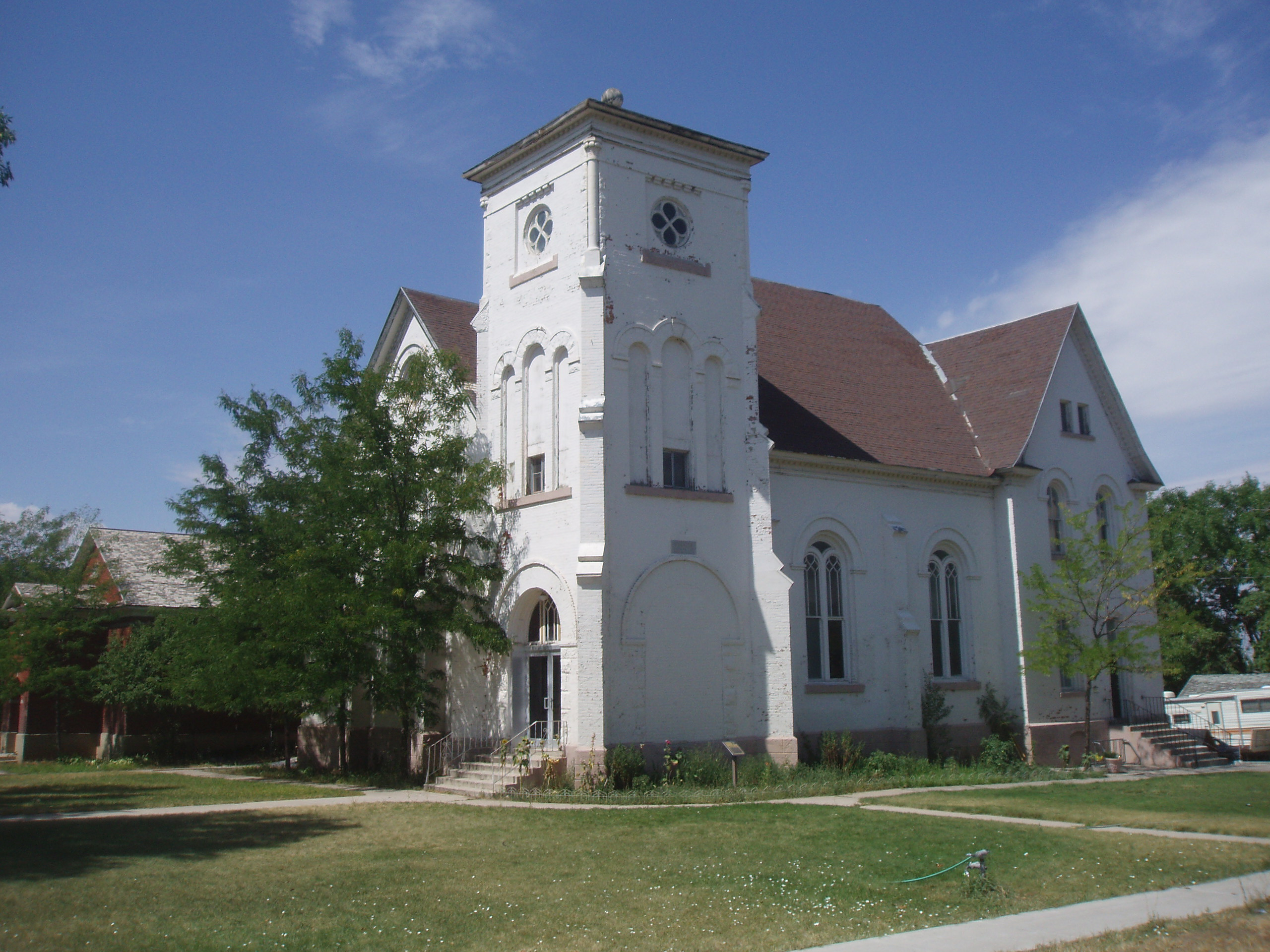
- The building in 2009

- Location within Utah Location within the United States
- Location: 290 South Center Street, Hyrum, Utah
- Coordinates: 41°37′41″N 111°51′19″W
- Area: less than one acre
- Built: 1903
- Architect: Karl C. Schaub
- Architectural style: Late Gothic Revival
- NRHP reference No.: 80003891
- Added to NRHP: February 15, 1980

The Hyrum First Ward Meetinghouse is a historic meetinghouse of the Church of Jesus Christ of Latter-day Saints in Hyrum, Utah. It was built in 1903, and designed in the Gothic Revival style by architect Karl C. Schaub. It has been listed on the National Register of Historic Places since February 15, 1980.
