= Maverik Stadium =

Utah State University football stadium

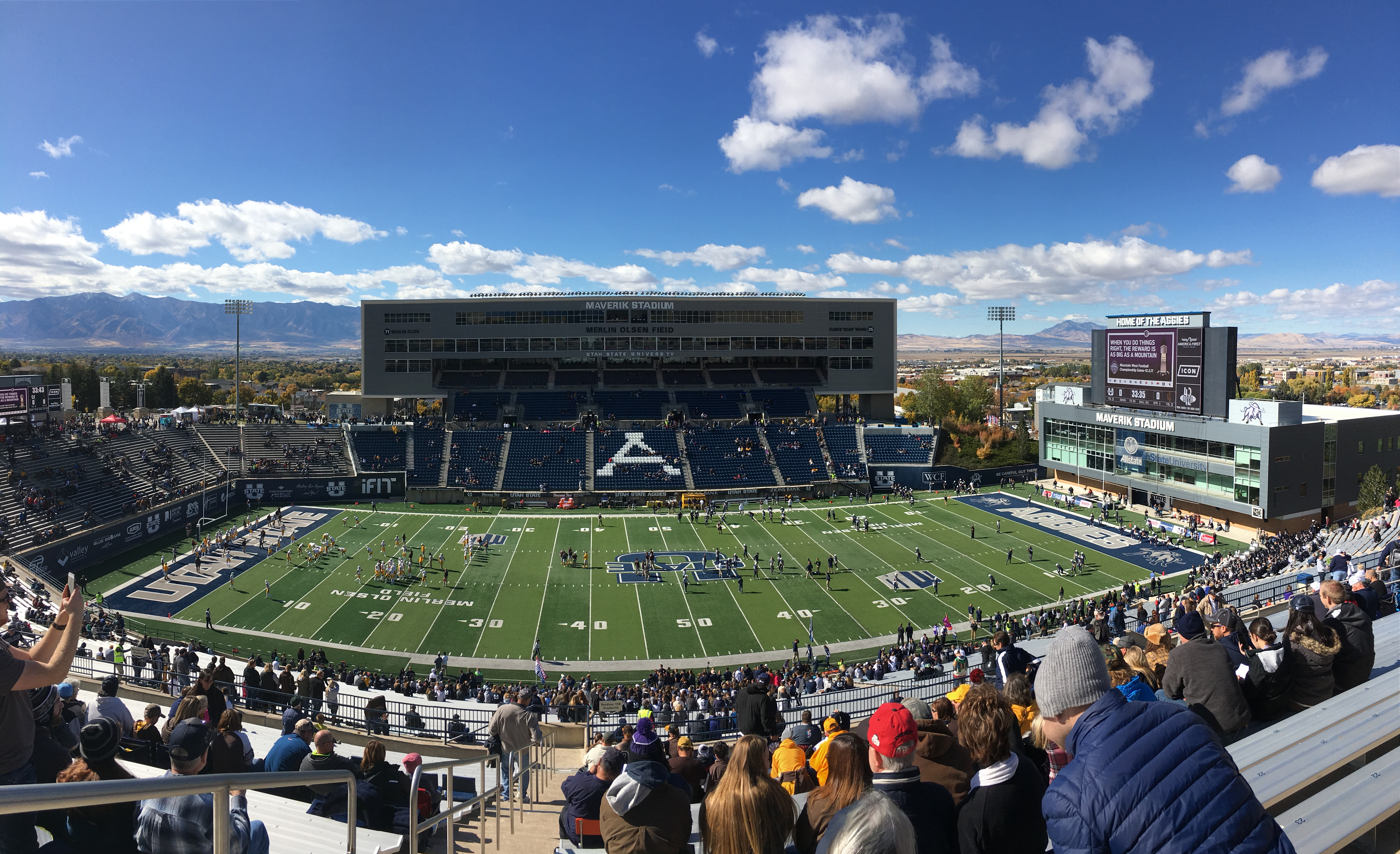
- View from east in 2017

- Location in the United States Location in Utah
- Interactive map of Maverik Stadium
- Former names: Romney Stadium (1968–2015)
- Address: 1000 North 800 East
- Location: Utah State University; Logan, Utah, U.S.
- Coordinates: 41°45′06″N 111°48′42″W
- Owner: Utah State University
- Operator: Utah State University
- Capacity: 25,513 (present); 30,257 (1980–2005); 20,000 (1968–1979)
- Surface: AstroTurf GameDay Grass 3D60 Extreme (2012– ) SprinTurf (2004–2011); Natural grass (1968–2003)

Construction
- Groundbreaking: 1968
- Opened: September 27, 1969; 57 years ago
- Renovated: 1980, 1999, 2005, 2006, 2015, 2016
- Cost: $3 million ($27.8 million in 2025)
- Architects: Cannon & Mullen

Tenants
- Utah State Aggies (NCAA) (1968–present)

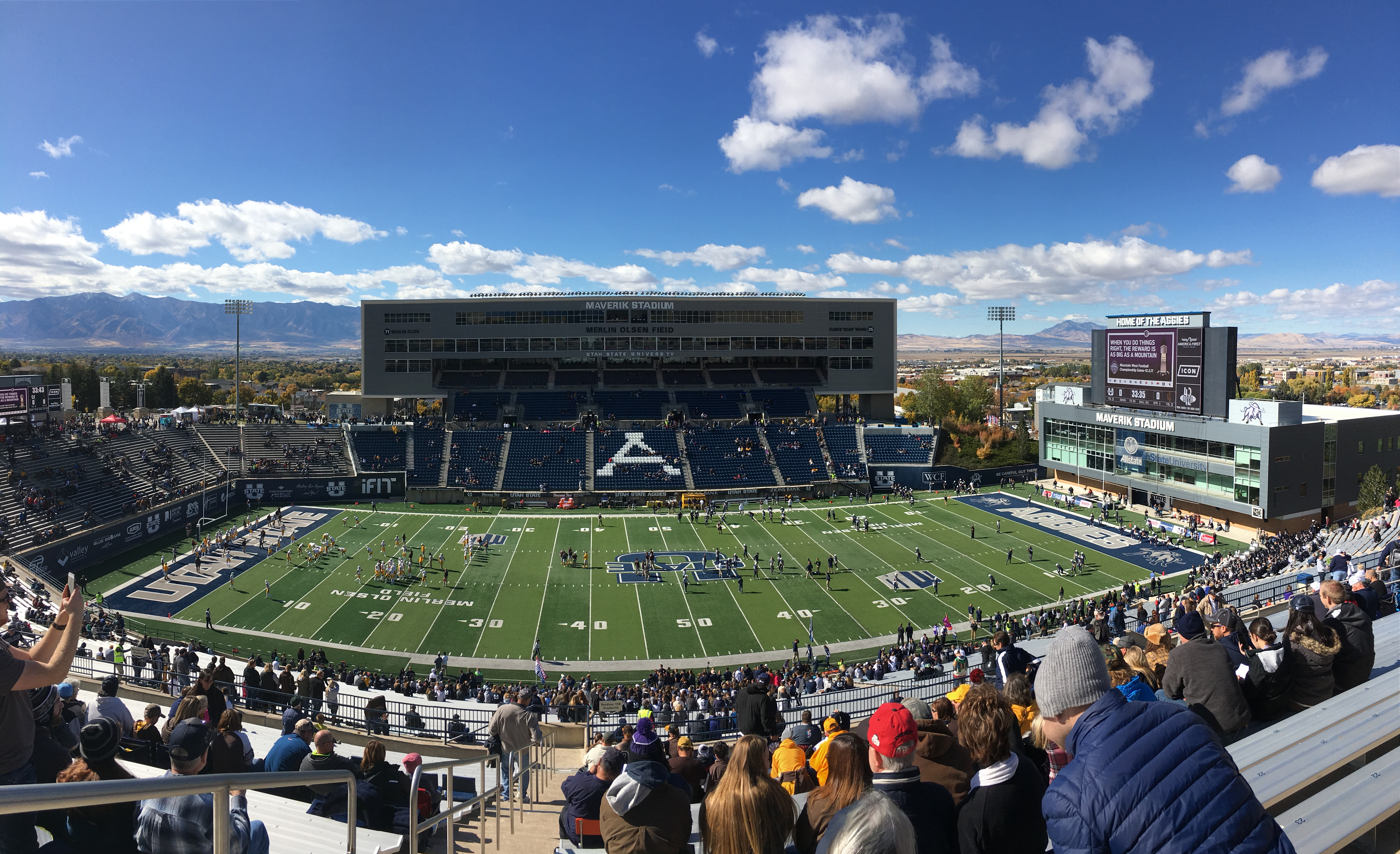
View from east before the 2017 homecoming game with Wyoming

Maverik Stadium, also known as Merlin Olsen Field at Maverik Stadium, is an outdoor college football stadium in Logan, Utah, located on the campus of Utah State University. It is the home of the Utah State Aggies of the Pac-12 Conference. The stadium opened in 1968 as Romney Stadium.

The stadium currently has a seating capacity of 25,513. It has a traditional north–south alignment, and sits at an elevation of 4,710 feet (1,435 m) above sea level. The playing surface was natural grass through 2003, and is currently AstroTurf GameDay Grass.

Previously named for Dick Romney, USU's all-time most successful football coach and former athletics director, Romney Stadium was officially dedicated on September 27, 1969. The first game in the stadium came a season earlier in 1968, when USU defeated New Mexico State 28–12 on September 14.

== History ==
Prior to the construction of the first Romney Stadium, intercollegiate and intramural competition took place on a makeshift field east of Old Main. This area, which would eventually become the Quad, served the needs of the college's football and track teams until 1913. According to historian A. J. Simmonds, it “was the responsibility of players to pick the rocks off the playing field before matches.” Student Phebe Nebeker recalled the field's appearance after accompanying her future husband, Elmer G. Peterson, to a contest in 1903. “It wasn't anything like what we think of today as a football stadium. It was merely a somewhat flat area - with a little grass here and there - that was very muddy when it rained and very hard when it didn't. One small set of bleachers had been erected near the southeast corner of Old Main, but most of the patrons had to stand or sit on patches of grass along the playing field.”

In 1913, college contests began taking place at Adams Field, located west of Old Main Hill on the east side of the present Adams Park. Although Adams Field represented an improvement, it did not provide the type of facility which could launch the Aggies into competitive intercollegiate play. The sparse facilities became more obvious after the college employed Coach Lowell “Dick” Romney in 1918, and Aggie football began experiencing considerable success.

=== First Romney Stadium ===
The original Romney Stadium was built in 1927 on the grounds where the Health, Physical Education and Recreation (HPER) building now stands. That facility was dedicated in 1927 on October 8, in recognition of Coach E.L. "Dick" Romney's lasting contributions to Utah State football. It served as Utah State's home for 41 seasons (1927–67); USU played its final game in the old complex on November 11, 1967, defeating Montana 20–14.

=== Second Romney Stadium ===
The stadium retained the Romney name as it was relocated farther north on Utah State's campus to its present location. The first game in the current location was played on Sept. 14, 1968 when the Aggies defeated New Mexico State, 28–12, and the facility was officially dedicated on Sept. 27, 1969. The stadium was financed by a student body which believed in athletics to the extent of underwriting a special bonding assessment for both Romney Stadium and the Dee Glen Smith Spectrum, which serves as home for Utah State's basketball, gymnastics, and volleyball teams.

Thanks to a massive volunteer effort in 1980, 10,000 seats were added to the southern bowl which brought the capacity of the stadium to 30,257. Prior to the 1997 season, approximately 4,000 chair back seats replaced wooden bleachers on the west side of the stadium. Ahead of the 1999 season, new scoreboards were added at each end of the stadium and additional bleacher seats were installed as well. New aluminum bleachers replaced wooden bleachers on the lower sections of the east side of the stadium in 2001. In 2003, that project expanded to the upper sections. Changes in the space allocated for a "seat" by the NCAA reduced stadium capacity to 25,513.

In the summer of 2004, the bent-bluegrass field was replaced with infilled synthetic turf by SprinTurf. Prior to the 2005 season, a new south end entrance, improved concession stands and restroom facilities as well as a widened concourse on the east side of the stadium were completed.

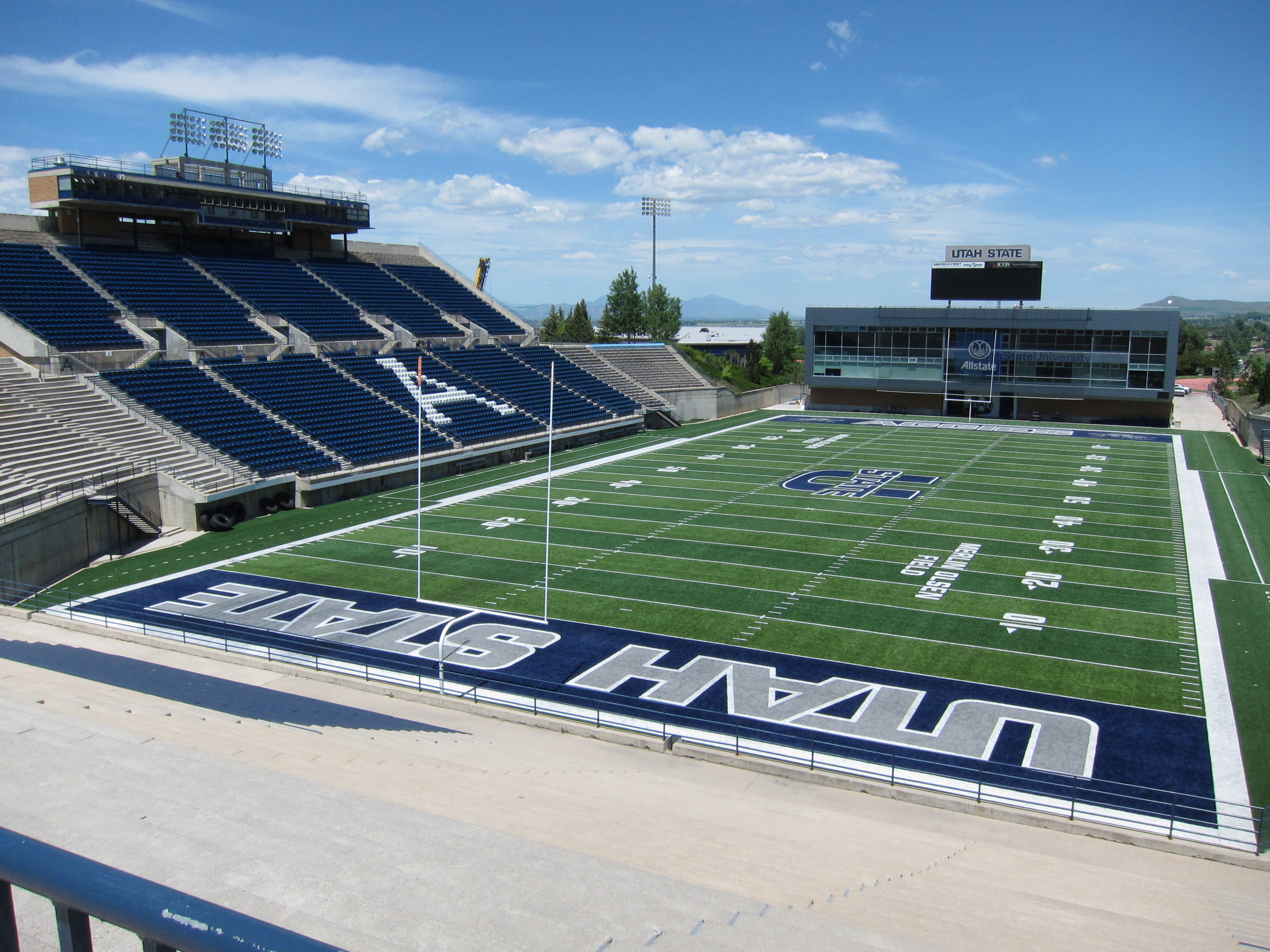
View from southeast in 2013 after upgrades to the turf and introduction of new logos, with Laub Athletics-Academics Complex in north end zone

=== Merlin Olsen Field ===
On December 5, 2009, USU announced that the field at Maverik Stadium (then Romney Stadium) would be named Merlin Olsen Field in honor of the USU alumnus, a member of the professional and college football halls of fame. Following Olsen's death in March 2010, Utah State dedicated a statue in his honor in a ceremony held on October 23, 2010. The bronze statue, created by Utah sculptor Blair Buswell, depicts Olsen during his Aggie playing days – in full uniform and pads, with his helmet under his arm – stands outside the stadium's south entrance.

Following the unveiling of new Utah State athletics logos and prior to the home opener of the 2012 season, the playing surface on Merlin Olsen Field was replaced. The SprinTurf, installed in 2004, was replaced by AstroTurf GameDay Grass 3D60 Extreme and the new athletic logo replaced the old at center field. The new end zones are navy blue with the “Utah State” word mark in the south end zone and the “Aggies” word mark in the north end zone, bookended by the new bull logo.

=== Renaming Romney Stadium ===
On April 11, 2015, the stadium was officially renamed Merlin Olsen Field at Maverik Stadium in conjunction with a corporate sponsorship from the Intermountain West-located chain of convenience stores. The partnership was hailed as a catalyst for the stadium renovation which was said would commence immediately with the demolition of the west side press box and a section of the west side seating. The partnership with Utah State and Maverik is a multi-year agreement, which includes top-tier advertising rights and prominent signage on the exterior and interior of the stadium. Additionally, the venue features a Maverik concession outlet that sells a number of Maverik proprietary food products.

Regarding the renaming, Coach Dick Romney's grandson, Richard Romney, stated that renaming Romney Stadium was bittersweet, but that the Romney family realizes that to be competitive and relevant in today's sports world, the team needs to have strong financial backing. Richard also stated, "What Grandpa accomplished at Utah State will never be duplicated in today's society. We know his name will remain prominent and continue to have a strong legacy at Utah State. His story will not be forgotten." Romney served Utah State for 41 years, coaching 4 sports and serving as athletic director. He was inducted into the Collegiate Football Hall of Fame in 1954. His personal athletic accomplishments included playing on the AAU Championship basketball team in 1916, and scoring a touchdown in the 1918 Rose Bowl.

On August 31, 2026, the university announced that the venue would be renamed to Jim Laub Family Stadium in honor of longtime program boosters Jim and Carol Laub. The change is to take effect on January 1, 2027.

== Changes to the stadium complex ==
=== Stadium renovation ===
In December 2014, a $1 million donation toward stadium renovation was announced. The donation was made by Utah State University alumnus and former President of Nike, Inc., Charlie Denson, and his wife, Trina. On the west side of the stadium, a new four-story premium seating and press box structure was built to include a state-of-the-art media and game operations area, 24 luxury suites, 24 loge boxes, over 700 covered club seats, and a premium club area that also hosts a student-athlete training table. Major concourse work included significantly increased restrooms, upgraded concessions, and an enlarged concourse for better pedestrian traffic flow. Improvements on the east included additional seating and restroom facilities. The renovation also added new video boards at both ends of the stadium, along with a new public address system. These renovations were debuted for the home opener against Weber State on September 1, 2016. Additional expansion of Maverik Stadium's seating capacity is also planned for the future.

=== Jim and Carol Laub Athletics-Academics Complex ===
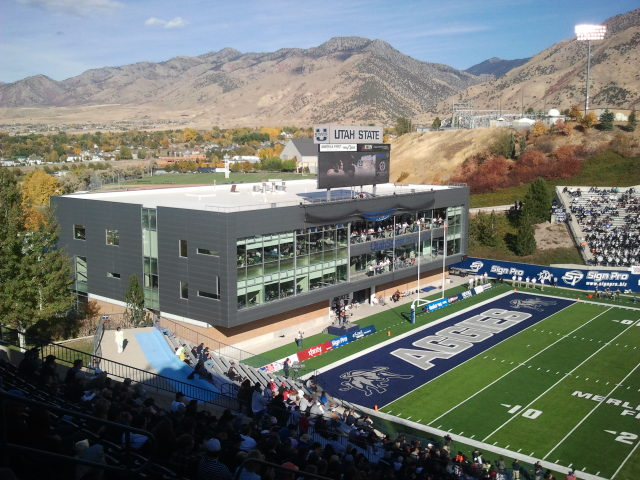
Laub Athletics-Academics Complex

Immediately after the 2006 season, the old north end zone complex was torn down and replaced with a three-story, 69,000-square-foot (6,400 m^{2}) facility called The Jim & Carol Laub Athletics-Academics Complex. It was completed in 2008. The facility houses the Dale Mildenberger Sports Medicine Complex, the Dr. John Worley Sports Medicine Research Center, the Steve Mothersell Hall of Fame, equipment room, locker rooms, coaches offices, meeting rooms, luxury suites, and a student-athlete academic center.

=== Strength and conditioning center ===
On May 26, 2012, a groundbreaking ceremony was held for the construction of a new strength and conditioning center. The facility was made possible by the largest single gift from an anonymous donor in the history of Aggie Athletics. The $6.4 million, 21,000-square-foot (2,000 m^{2}) strength and conditioning center opened in late July 2013. It features areas for weight training, cardiovascular workouts, and speed and agility training, as well as staff offices. Built on existing university property at the northwest corner of Romney Stadium, the state-of-the-art multi-level facility alleviates overcrowding in the former 5,800-square-foot (540 m^{2}) strength and conditioning center and will accommodate almost 400 athletes from 16 sports programs.

=== West Stadium Center at Maverik Stadium ===
On September 1, 2016, the Aggies unveiled renovations to a new press box and luxury suite complex at Maverik Stadium. The state-of-the-art facility was made possible largely by private donations. The total cost of the renovations was $36 million. It features 20 plus suites with 640 club seats. Two new scoreboards with enlarged video screens and an upgraded sound system were also included in the project. The stadium's capacity was temporarily reduced to 22,059 for the 2015 season as work progressed.

== Team history at Maverik Stadium ==
Dick Romney guided the Aggies to four conference championships, compiling a 128–91–16 record (.579) in 29 seasons (1919–48). Over the past 33 seasons, Utah State has compiled a 94–69 mark (.577) winning percentage in the current Maverik Stadium. Only nine times in the 33-year history of the stadium has Utah State experienced a losing record at home.

Utah State's largest crowd to witness a game in Maverik Stadium was 33,119 (including standing room) in a 45–17 loss to BYU on October 4, 1996.

The largest crowd to watch a high school football game in Utah's history occurred at Romney Stadium. The 1987 3A state championship game was moved from Salt Lake City's Rice Stadium to accommodate the all-Cache Valley match-up of Mountain Crest and Sky View. Mountain Crest won 9–7 before 19,887 spectators.

== See also ==
- List of NCAA Division I FBS football stadiums
