= Elite Hall =

- U.S. National Register of Historic Places
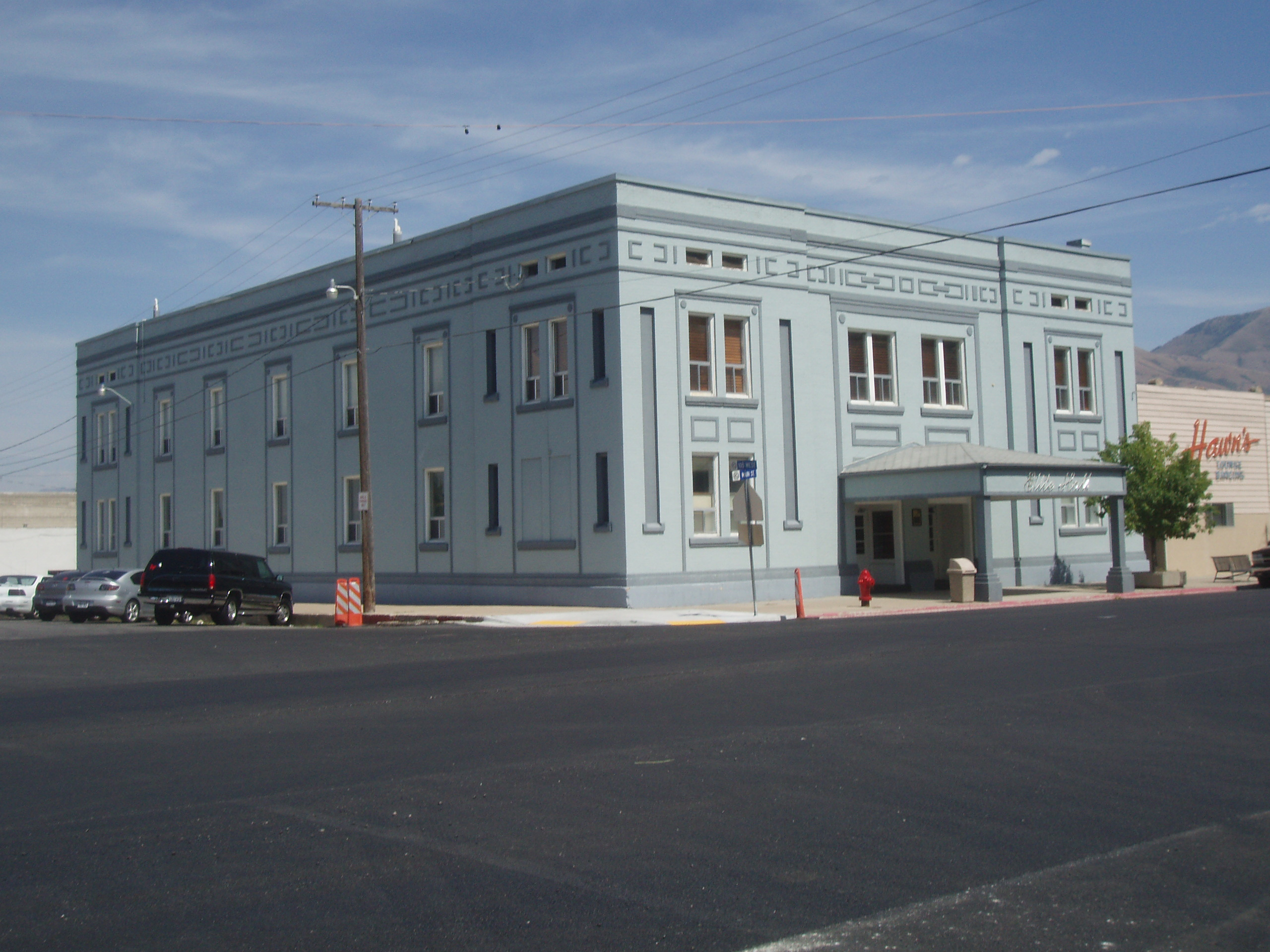

- Location within Utah Location within the United States
- Location: 98 W. Main St., Hyrum, Utah
- Coordinates: 41°38′4″N 111°51′25″W
- Area: less than one acre
- Built: 1917
- Built by: A.J. Peterson
- Architect: K.C. Schaub
- Architectural style: Late 19th and Early 20th Century American Movements
- NRHP reference No.: 03000736
- Added to NRHP: August 4, 2003

Elite Hall, at 98 W. Main St. in Hyrum, Utah, is a historic dance hall that was built in 1917 that is listed on the National Register of Historic Places. In 2003, when it was listed, it was deemed significant for association with community life in Hyrum and as one of only two surviving spring-loaded dance floors in Utah. It has an "imposing presence" on the Main Street of Hyrum, and is mainly commercial-style but has elements of Prairie School styling in its design.

It was listed on the National Register of Historic Places in 2003.
