= Karl C. Schaub =

American architect

Karl Conrad Schaub
- Born: December 12, 1869; Grisons, Switzerland
- Died: January 31, 1959 (aged 89)
- Resting place
- Education: Brigham Young University; Utah State University
- Occupation: Architect
- Spouse: Jessie Ann Adams
- Children: 10

Karl C. Schaub (December 12, 1869 – January 31, 1959) was a Swiss-born American architect who designed many buildings in the state of Utah, including the NRHP-listed Hyrum First Ward Meetinghouse and Old Main in Logan. He was the co-partner of Schaub and Monson with Joseph Monson for eight years. He also served as a bishop of the Church of Jesus Christ of Latter-day Saints.

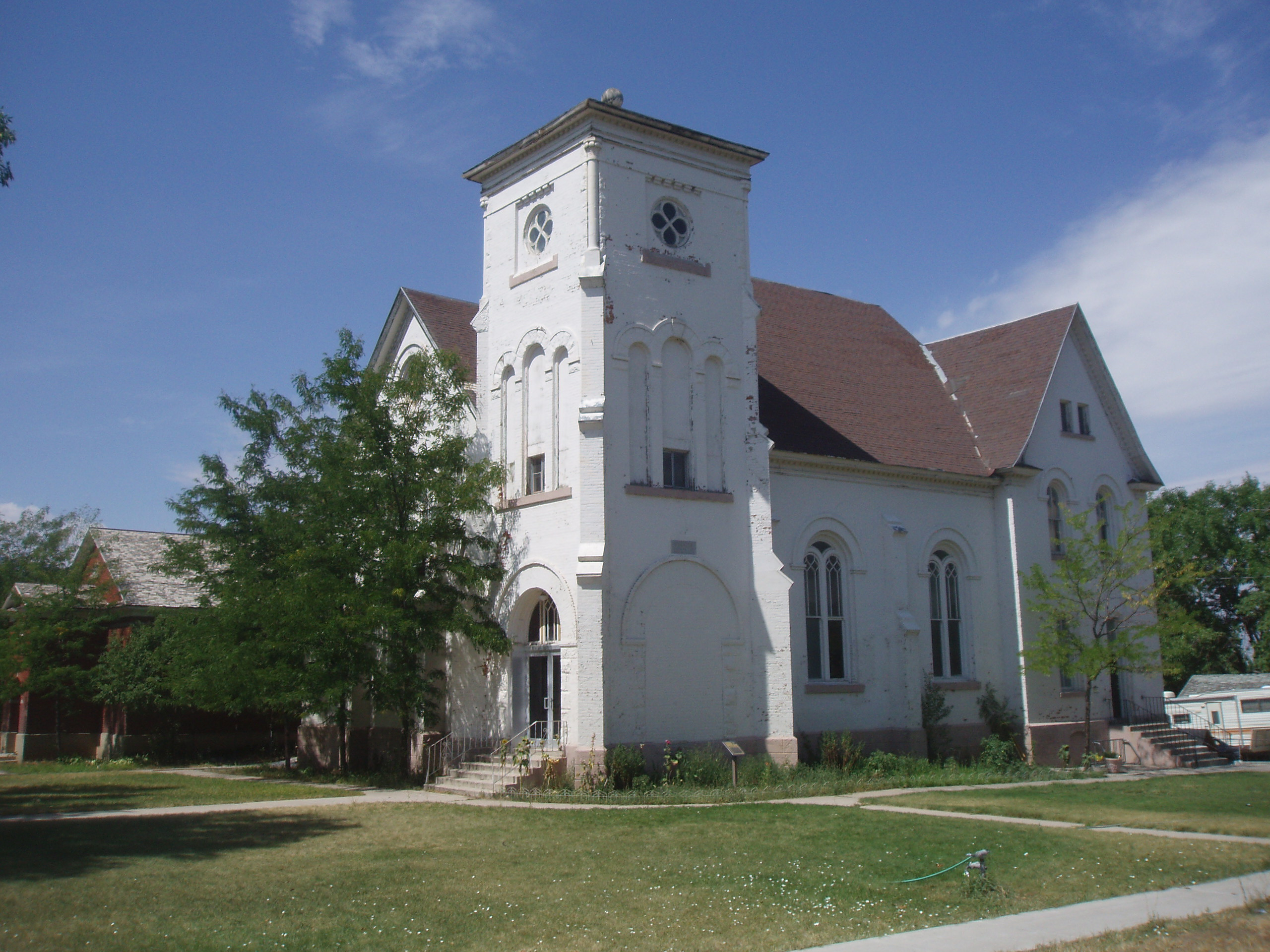
The Hyrum First Ward Meetinghouse.

Works include:

- Old Main, Utah State University (1902), Utah State University campus, Logan, UT (Carl S. Schaub), NRHP-listed Schaub revised, re-drew plans by architect Thompson used in 1890 start of construction
- Hyrum First Ward Meetinghouse (1903), 290 S. Center St., Hyrum, UT (Schaub, Karl C.), NRHP-listed
- Logan LDS Sixth Ward Church (1907), 395 S. Main St., Logan, UT (Schaub, K.C.), NRHP-listed
- David Eccles House (1907), 250 W. Center St., Logan, UT (Schaub, Karl C.), NRHP-listed
- Elite Hall (1917), 98 W. Main St., Hyrum, UT (Schaub, K.C.), NRHP-listed
- Lewiston Community Building, 29 S. Main St., Lewiston, UT (Schaub, Karl C.), NRHP-listed
- McCune School of Music (Alfred & Elizabeth McCune Mansion, National Register listed in 1974)
- Thomas Kearns Mansion (National Register listed in 1970)
