= David Eccles House =

- U.S. National Register of Historic Places
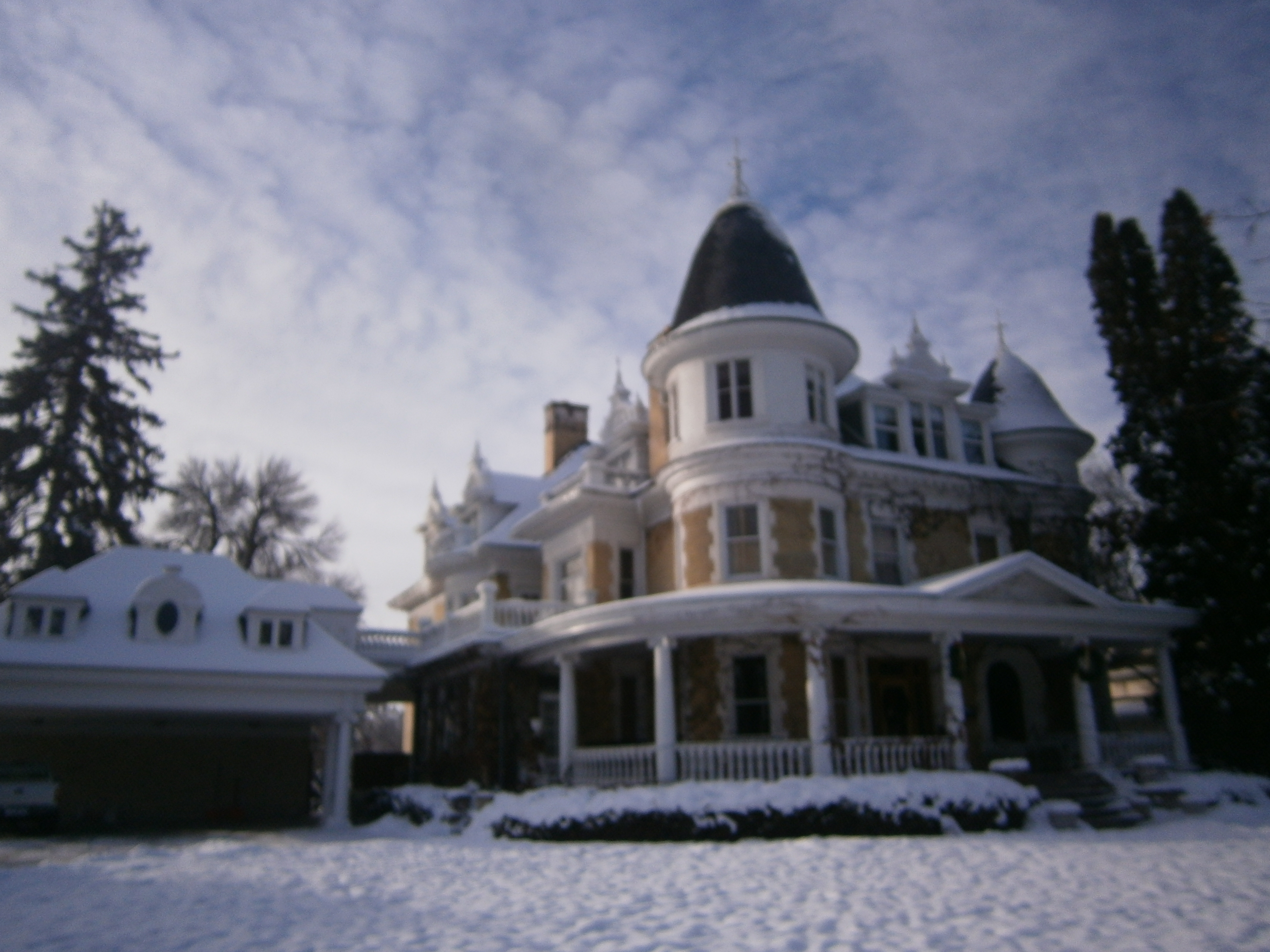

- Location within Utah Location within the United States
- Location: 250 W. Center St., Logan, Utah
- Coordinates: 41°43′52″N 111°50′26″W
- Area: less than one acre
- Built: 1907
- Architect: Joseph Monson, Karl C. Schaub
- Architectural style: Classical Revival, Queen Anne
- NRHP reference No.: 76001811
- Added to NRHP: July 30, 1976

The David Eccles House, at 250 W. Center St. in Logan, Utah, was built in 1907. It was listed on the National Register of Historic Places in 1976.

It was designed by Logan architects Joseph Monson and Karl C. Schaub. Overall it is Eclectic or Late Victorian in style, with Queen Anne influence, with numerous Classical Revival style details, and with two turrets which have been termed Chateauesque.

Through 1976 it was regarded as the largest home in Cache Valley. It has three stories, 24 rooms, and 11,000 square feet (1,000 m^{2}).

In 1943 it became a dormitory for the Utah State Agricultural College and was cut up into bedrooms and bathrooms. Later it was a fraternity house. It was sold in 1970 to private owners who renovated it, and by 1976 much of its original character had been restored.

== Logan Challenge ==
The folklore surrounding the mansion includes a challenge where young people from around the valley would be invited to enter the basement through a single door and make it to the third floor and back down while the owners were sleeping. Many students from Utah State University would do the challenge in complete fear before realizing it was a joke, often followed up by a dance party in the lower rooms of the mansion.

Notes about the house include:

- "The Eccles Mansion is built of brick with white stone trim and a cut coursed stone foundation. The front facade is accentuated by two round towers or turrets, one at each of the front corners. Several dormers with fancy classical facades punctuate the massive hip roof. A Neo-Classical Revival porch wraps around two sides of the front of the home. Within the triangular porch pediment is a foliated inscription with the letters "D. E." for David Eccles, The sprawling plan is basically rectangular but includes two wings and two prominent bay windows which give variety to the basic form."
- "Most detailing is Neo-Classical Revival and includes Ionic columns and a classical porch entablature and pediment, quoins about the door and window bays, brackets and dentils under the cornice, classical facades and pilasters in the dormers. The towers are shingled on the upper portions and have bell shaped cupolas or roofs and generally reflect Queen Anne or perhaps Chateauesque origins. There are 19 leaded, cut glass windows in the building."
