= Logan LDS Sixth Ward Church =

Historic church in Utah, United States

- U.S. National Register of Historic Places
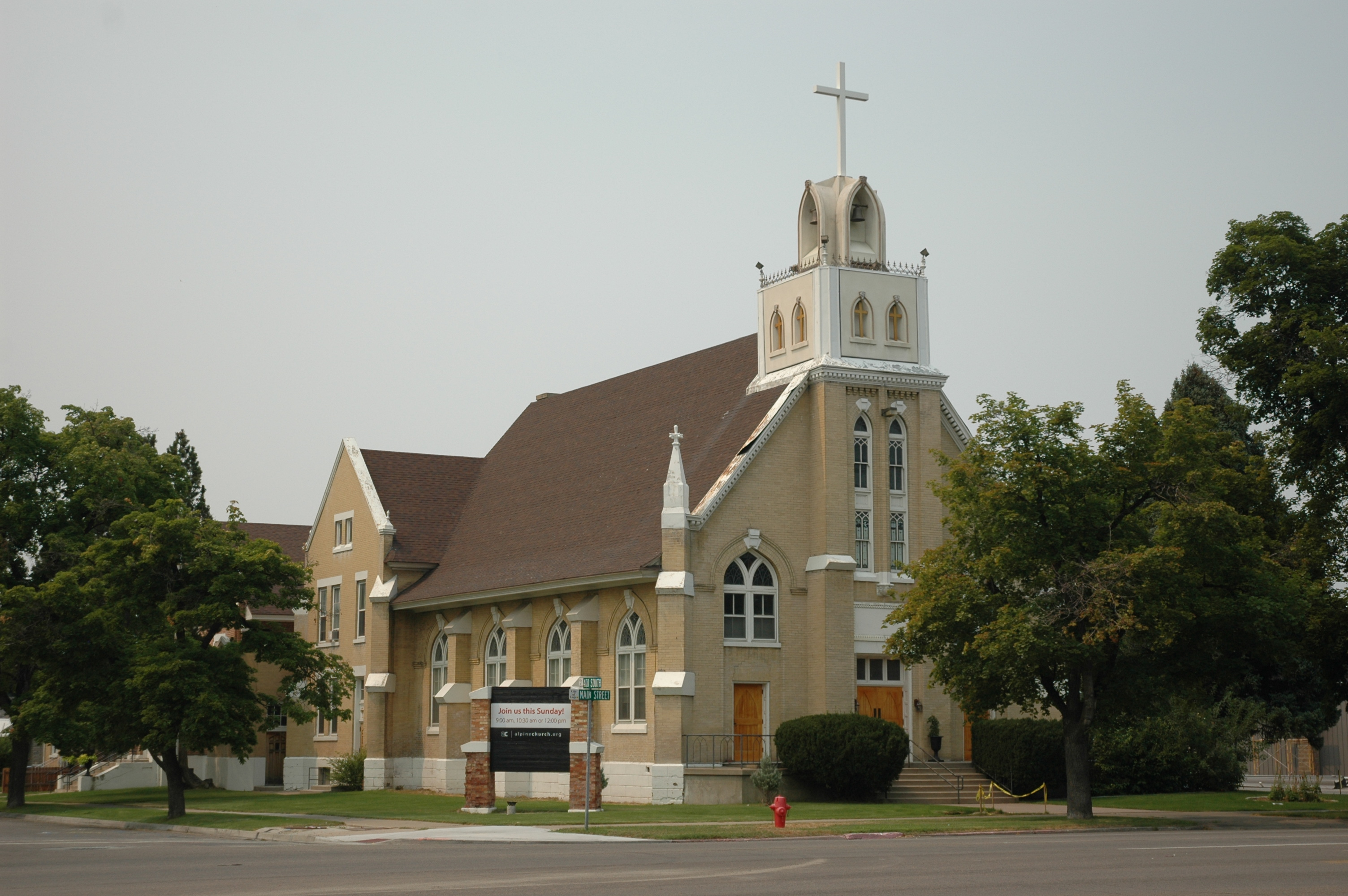
- The church in 2012

- Location within Utah Location within the United States
- Location: 395 South Main Street, Logan, Utah
- Coordinates: 41°43′27″N 111°50′06″W
- Area: less than one acre
- Built: 1907
- Built by: Olof I. Pedersen
- Architect: K. C. Schaub, Joseph Monson
- Architectural style: Gothic
- NRHP reference No.: 79002489
- Added to NRHP: July 17, 1979

The Logan LDS Sixth Ward Church is a historic church in Logan, Utah of the Church of Jesus Christ of Latter-day Saints. It was built in 1907 by Olof I. Pedersen, and designed in the Gothic Revival style by architects K. C. Schaub and Joseph Monson. It has been listed on the National Register of Historic Places since July 17, 1979.
