= Joseph Monson =

American architect

Joseph Monson (1862–1932) was an architect based first in Logan, Utah and later in Salt Lake City, Utah. At least two of his works are listed on the National Register of Historic Places.

He was born February 2, 1862, in Logan, and died February 16, 1932.

He worked for his father's construction company, including, at age 16, helping to build the Logan LDS Temple.

After he served a Mormon mission to Norway in 1883–85, he became an architect.

In Logan, he partnered with Karl C. Schaub for eight years, with Monson as the senior partner. Monson and Schaub designed "major" buildings for the Agricultural College of Utah (later Utah State University) and most of the schools in Cache County.

He served as Supervisory Architect for Utah State Schools for eight years. According to Michael Wirthlin, this was his "most noteworthy contribution. […] As the Supervisory Architect, he helped to establish a unified style of school architecture and specific guidelines to insured quality and safety of schoolhouse design and construction."

He also was a membership of the Territorial Legislature prior to statehood, and he was elected and served two terms in the Utah State House of Representatives and one term in the Utah State Senate.

Works include:

- David Eccles House (1907), Logan, Utah (with Karl C. Schaub), NRHP-listed
- Whittier School (1908), Logan, Utah, NRHP-listed
- Richmond Ward LDS Tabernacle religious facility (1904), Richmond, Utah (with Karl C. Schaub). Demolished.
- Ensign LDS Ward Meetinghouse, Salt Lake City, Utah
- Logan LDS Sixth Ward Church (1907), Logan, Utah (with Karl C. Schaub), NRHP-listed
- St. George Stake Academy Building (1911), St. George, Utah, NRHP-listed
