= Whittier School (Logan, Utah) =

- U.S. National Register of Historic Places
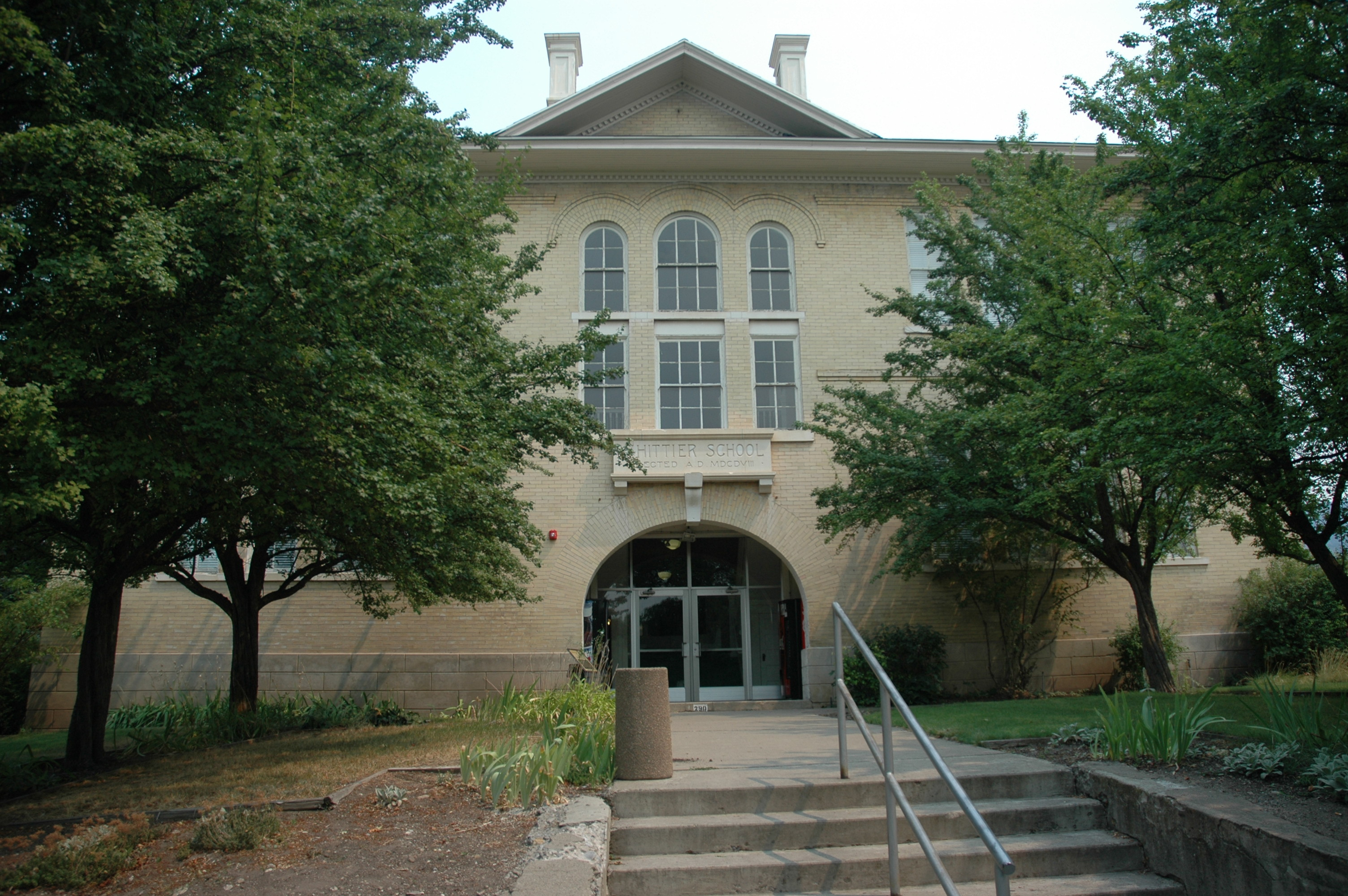

- Location within Utah Location within the United States
- Location: 280 North 400 East, Logan, Utah
- Coordinates: 41°44′12″N 111°49′24″W
- Area: 2 acres (0.81 ha)
- Built: 1908
- Architect: Joseph Monson
- Architectural style: Romanesque, Prairie School
- NRHP reference No.: 00001066
- Added to NRHP: September 8, 2000

The Whittier School in Logan, Utah, at 280 North 400 East, was built in 1908. It was listed on the National Register of Historic Places in 2000.

It was designed by Logan architect Joseph Monson. It includes elements of Romanesque and Prairie School architecture.

It was the site of the Emma Eccles Jones' development of the first kindergarten program in Utah; she taught for three years without salary and raised funds for the program, which became the model for future kindergarten programs that went statewide in 1947.

It was a district school for 19 years, then served as a laboratory school for the Utah State Agricultural College, from 1927 on for 30 years. Later it was a community arts center.
