= Swift raids =

2006 U.S. illegal immigration raids

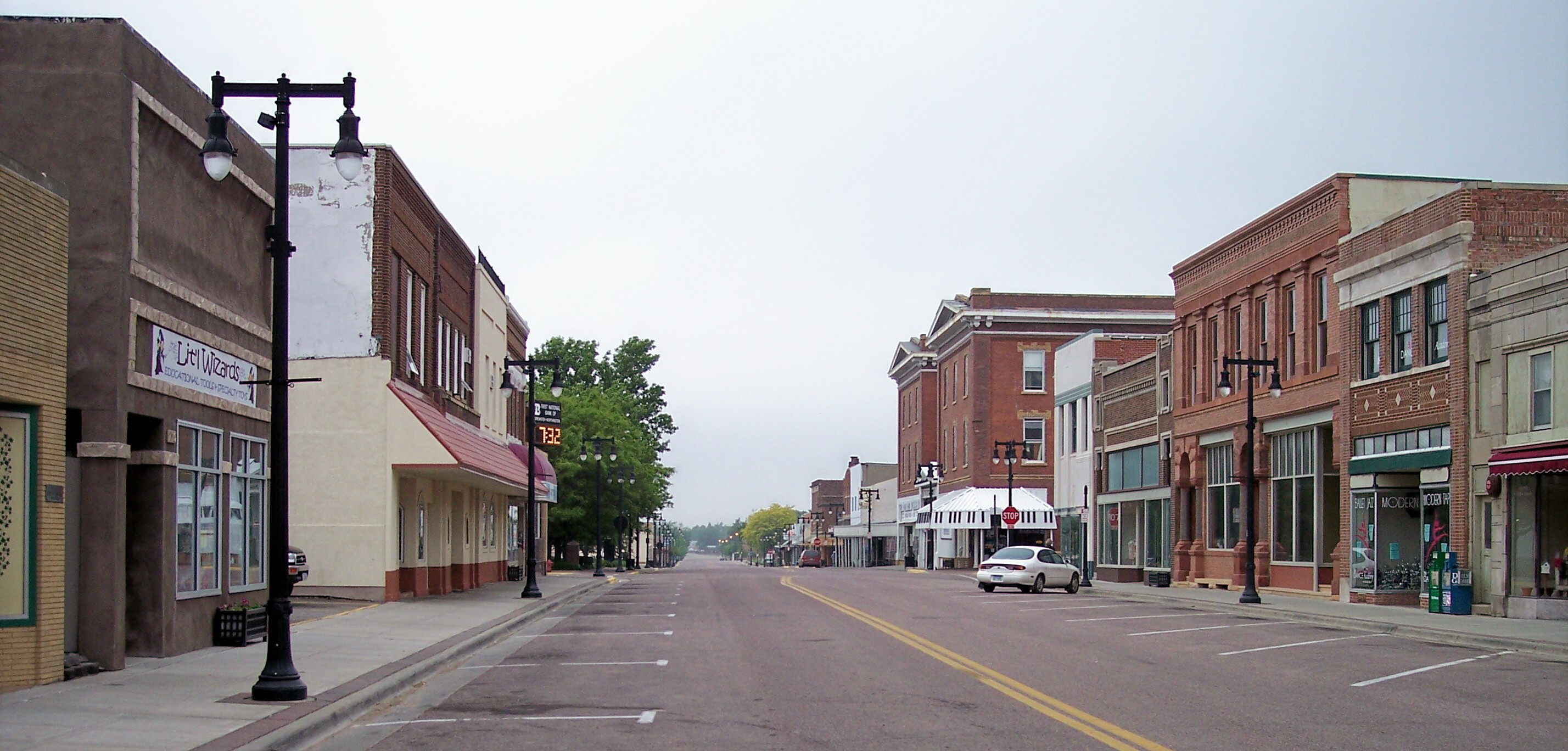
Worthington, Minnesota, one of six towns affected by the raids

The 2006 Swift raids were a coordinated effort by United States Immigration and Customs Enforcement (ICE) to detain and deport undocumented workers at Swift & Company meatpacking plants.

On Tuesday, December 12, 2006, ICE raided six Swift & Company meatpacking plants in the midwestern and southwestern United States. Workers were detained in central areas of these plants, where they were searched and interrogated. About 1,300 workers, accused of immigration violations and identity theft, were arrested and bused to detention facilities; most were deported.

ICE's "Operation Wagon Train", which culminated in the Swift raids, represented a new stage of immigration enforcement. The operation marked the beginning of increased workplace actions, as well as the special targeting of illegal immigrants who were also accused of crimes. It was the largest workplace immigration raid in U.S. history.

== Background ==
Illegal aliens make up an estimated 4.6 percent of the US workforce. At Swift & Co. meatpackers (purchased soon after the raids by JBS S.A.), those arrested during the raid were 10% of the company's workforce. Because only illegal aliens from the first shift were arrested, the actual proportion may have been substantially higher.

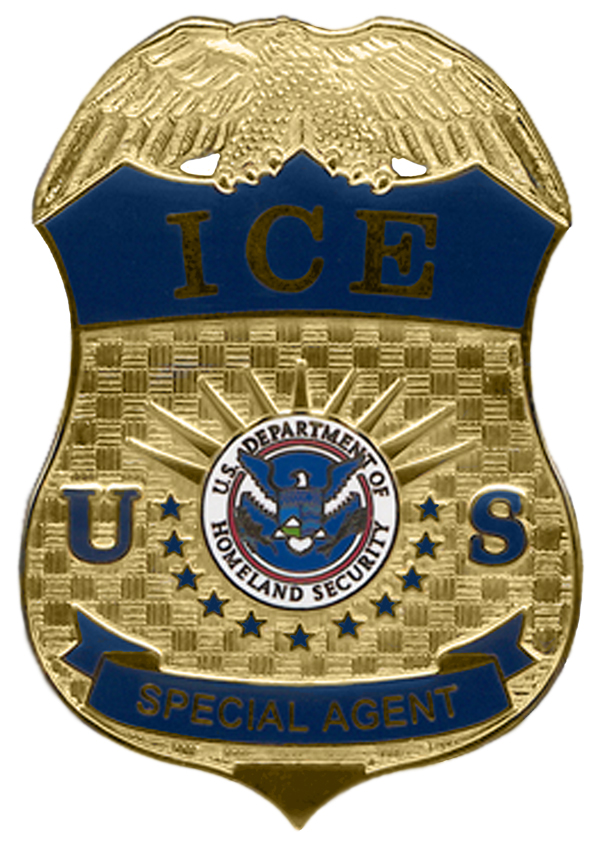
ICE Agent Badge

ICE, a branch of the Department of Homeland Security (DHS), investigated Swift for ten months prior to the raid. ICE subpoenaed Swift's employee records in March 2006. It confirmed that some of Swift's employees had used Social Security information and birth certificates of others to illegally obtain employment.

Swift apparently learned that they were under investigation, and was already making efforts to decrease their reliance on illegal workers. The company shed about 400 illegal workers between March and December 2006. However, upon request from the DHS, Swift did not inform its workers about the coming raids.

On November 28, 2006, Swift requested an injunction against an ICE enforcement action, arguing that they were cooperating as best they could. On December 7, the injunction was denied by District Judge Mary Lou Robinson. On December 8, ICE obtained a search warrant, which served as legal justification for the raid. The basis of this warrant was 133 suspicious cases at Swift & Co.

== Raids ==
On December 12, federal agents raided Swift plants in Hyrum, Utah; Greeley, Colorado; Marshalltown, Iowa; Grand Island, Nebraska; Cactus, Texas; and Worthington, Minnesota. The action against Swift & Co. was known as "Operation Wagon Train" within the DHS. It was executed by over 1,000 ICE police, in some cases backed by local police with riot gear. Thousands of workers—estimates range from 12,000 to 20,000 —were directly affected. Testimony suggests that events unfolded similarly at the six plants.

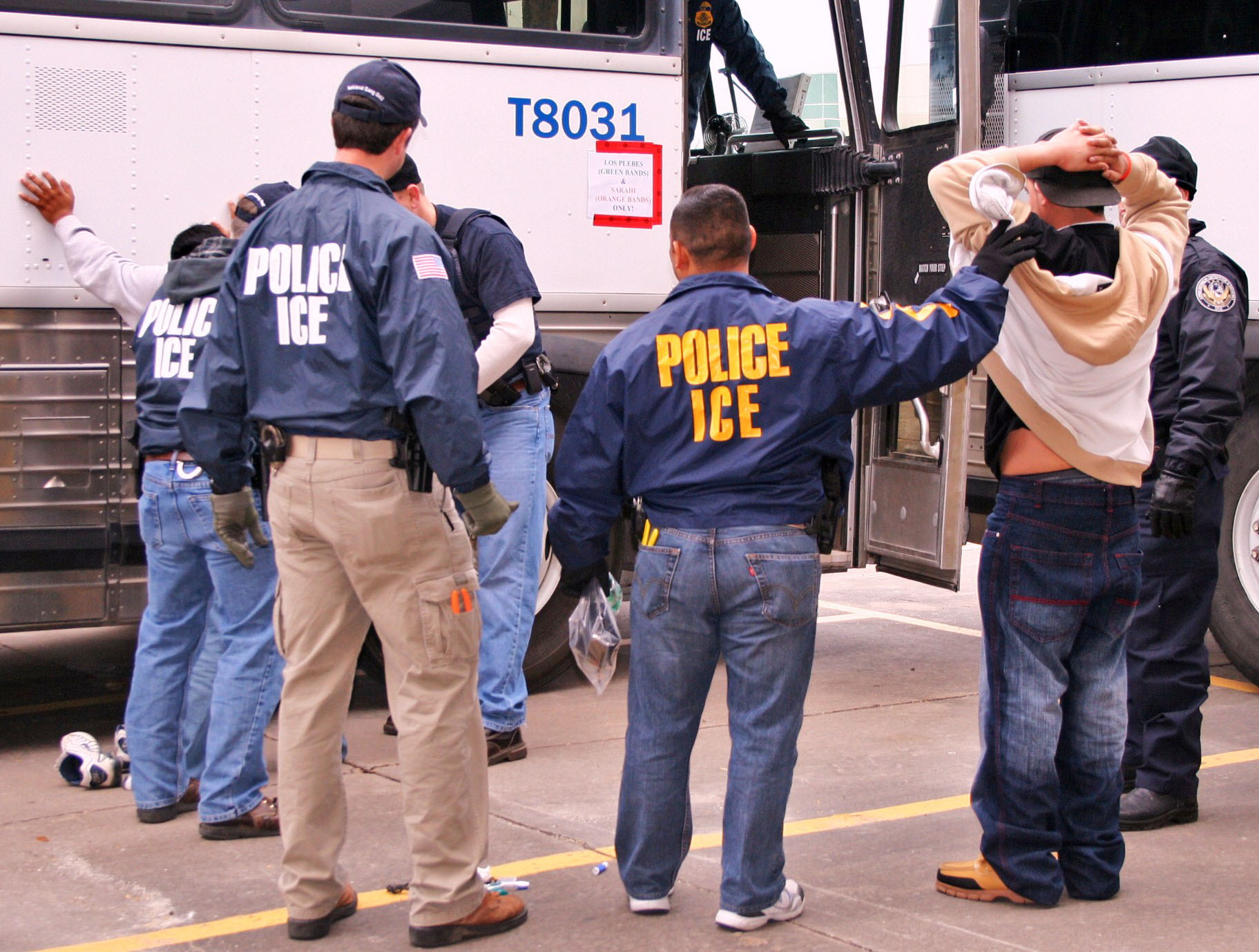
ICE agents and detainees in Houston

Managers shut down assembly lines and instructed workers to report to central areas. Some resisted and were reportedly sprayed with chemical weapons. Many were handcuffed. In some plants, workers were separated into two lines on the basis of their skin color; lighter-skinned workers were dismissed more quickly, while their darker-skinned counterparts were detained.

Agents then interrogated them and decided which to arrest—a difficult process since many had not brought identification to work on that day. Language barriers also created confusion. ICE made use of Spanish translators, but in some cases these spoke with a Guatemalan dialect and had trouble communicating with the workers.

There is disagreement over how well the detainees were treated. One person described being put in a large room with other workers and receiving McDonald's hamburgers from ICE:

"They would throw the food for us at the floor, and we had to pick it up from the floor," Ana said. She also contends the group of 30 to 40 she was with had to share a single toilet, and the officers prohibited them from flushing it. "They closed the water (off) so that we couldn't flush the water, because they said they were going to punish us because we kept crying and talking," said Ana. "And they didn't give us any toilet paper."

Other workers said they were simply denied access to food, water, and toilets. A shot may have been fired by an ICE agent in response to one worker's attempted escape from the Swift plant in Greeley.

Friends and family outside reported being unable to contact the workers. They said that ICE police handed them sheets of paper with an area-code 800 number to dial later.

ICE Director Julie Myers countered these claims in a written statement submitted On December 18, 2006, to the U.S. District Court in Colorado:

There were no locked doors, and no one was prevented from leaving the area. Officers ensured that the employees entered the cafeteria in a safe and orderly fashion and had properly stored their meatpacking tools, many of which were dangerous objects. Officers did not frisk the employees or act in anything but a calm and courteous manner so as to facilitate the safest environment possible. A Swift management team was present during the entire vetting and questioning period. Public telephones were available for those aliens who wanted to contact family members or friends who could bring evidence of lawful status or simply to make calls.

The period of detention in the plants typically lasted between six and eight hours, after which some workers were arrested and some were told to go home.

In the next few days, small teams of ICE agents went from door to door in the affected communities over the next few days, looking for certain identity theft suspects.

== Long-term detention and deportation ==
ICE police arrested 1,297 workers and sent them on buses to federal detention centers. Arrestees were moved often, and many were quickly transported outside of their home state. The Denver Federal Center was a common early destination. Subsequent prison sites included the Denver Contract Detention Facility in Aurora, Colorado, the Otero County Detention Center in New Mexico, and Camp Dodge in Iowa. Two ministers who tried to visit detainees at Camp Dodge were unable to gain access.

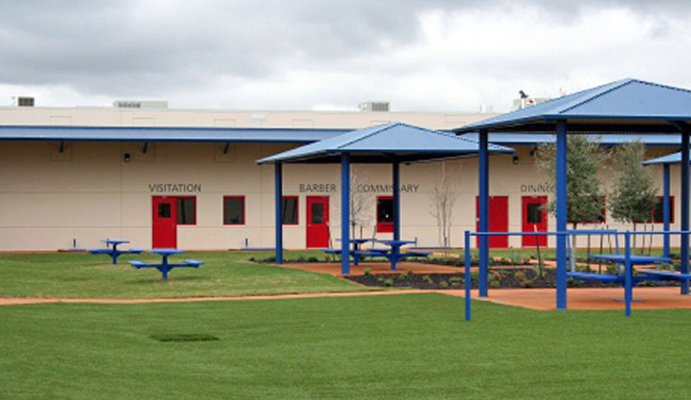
ICE jail in Karnes County, TX

Some of the few who were later able to testify complained of further degrading treatment, unsanitary food, denial of hygiene, and isolation from friends, family, and lawyers. Myers disputed the severity of the detention and wrote that the detainees had access to lawyers.

Most of those arrested were deported. While in detention facilities, many signed papers agreeing to voluntary deportation with no appeal. Most did not have access to telephones, lawyers, or the Consulate of their destination before they made this decision. Many of those who did not agree to voluntary deportation were detained for months longer. Some who were ultimately able to prove legal residency were held for weeks in detention facilities out of state.

Approximately 240 of the 1,297 arrested were ultimately charged with crimes (in addition to administrative immigration violations). About 65 were charged with identity theft.

The raid broke up couples and families. Many children were separated from their fathers; some lost both parents and had to find new places to live. Some local school systems took responsibility for supervising these children immediately after the raid; however, many children returned home from school to find their parents missing. Many people including children went into hiding, fearing that they would also be deported.

== Responses and aftermath ==
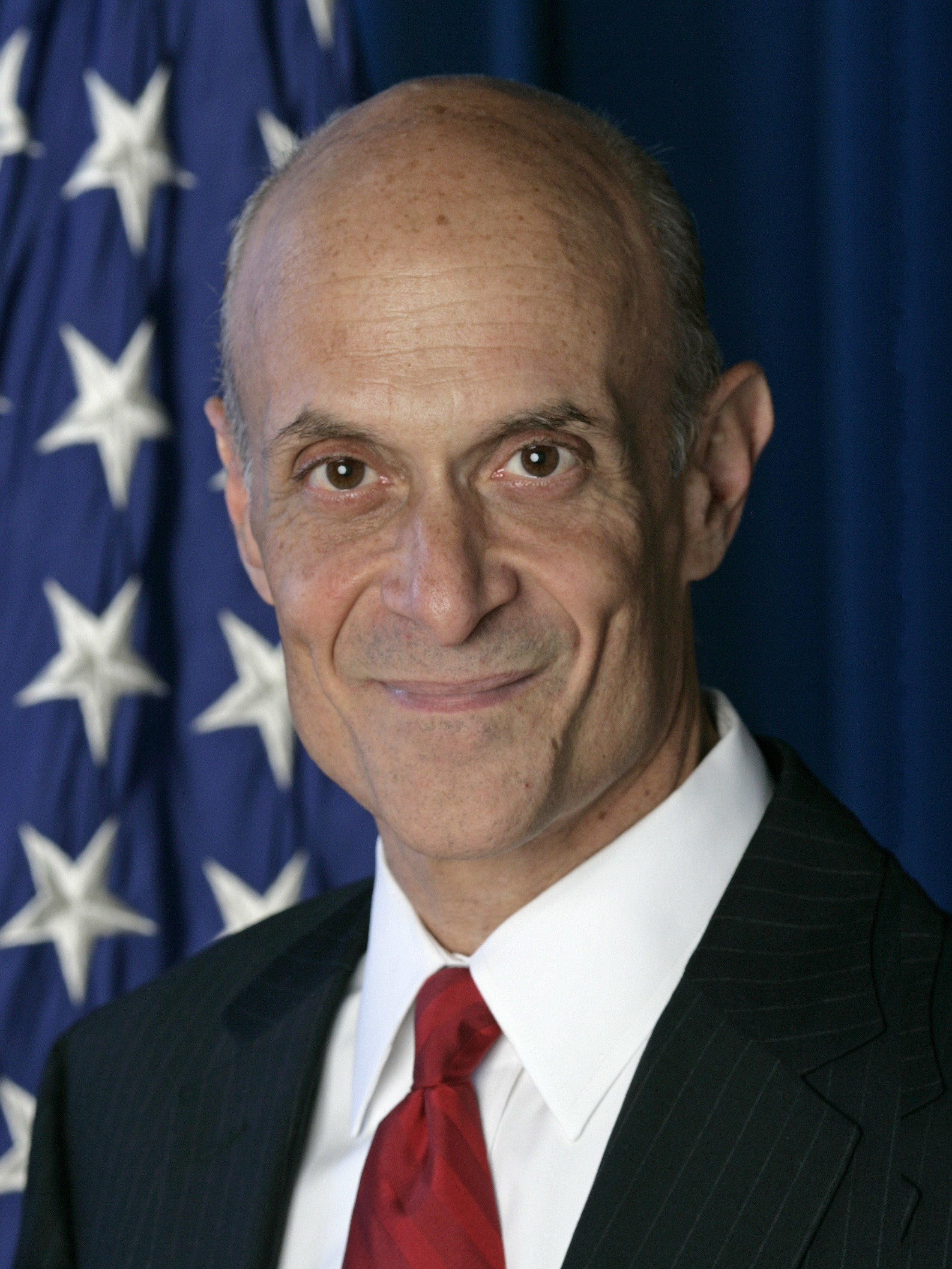
Michael Chertoff, Secretary of Homeland Security 2005–2009

On December 13, 2006, Michael Chertoff (Secretary of Homeland Security), Julie L. Myers (Director of ICE), and Deborah Platt Majoras (Chair of the Federal Trade Commission) claimed responsibility for the raid and emphasized the importance of the identity theft charges. Said Chertoff, "...this is not only a case about illegal immigration, which is bad enough. It's a case about identity theft in violation of the privacy rights and the economic rights of innocent Americans." Chertoff described the specific case of a man in Texas who was pulled over and arrested because his Social Security number was in use by an illegal worker. Myers later called the raid "righteous" for the same reason.

Minnesota Roman Catholic bishops condemned the raid, saying it "heartlessly divided families, disrupted the whole community of Worthington and undermined progress that that city had made toward bridging racial and cultural differences." They also criticized the government for making the arrests on the feast day of Our Lady of Guadalupe.

A manager and a union organizer in Marshalltown, Iowa, were later convicted of helping people to get jobs at Swift without proper documentation. No charges were brought against Swift's corporate officials. Swift complained that it was under pressure from both sides, having been sued in 2002 for discriminating against workers in its efforts to ensure that they were correctly documented.

The raids also had a substantial economic impact on Swift, and some business commentators claim that the loss of workers led to the company's 2007 acquisition by JBS. A 2009 study reported that Swift was paying better wages because of the need to attract new workers. Somalis, Burmese, and other political refugees from East African countries were hired to fill the void left by the deportations. According to one 2008 law review, the severity of this action increased pressure on other employers to comply with ICE's worker verification protocol (ICE Mutual Agreement between Government and Employers, or "IMAGE").

== Legal actions ==
On the day after the raid, United Food and Commercial Workers (UFCW), the union representing the meatpacking workers, filed a petition for habeas corpus. UFCW also asked for an injunction against ICE on the grounds that they were mistreating the detainees. ICE filed a response attacking UFCW's legal standing and stating that the detainees had not been mistreated, and the case was dismissed in January.

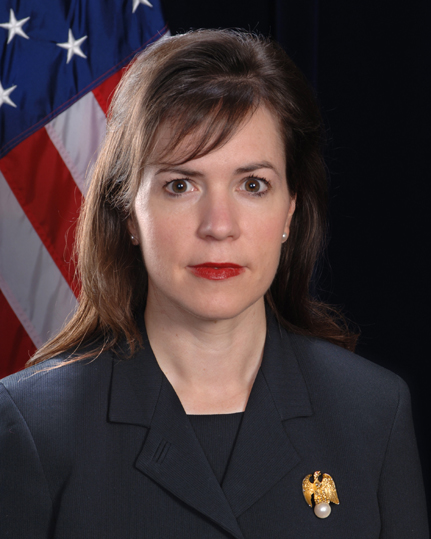
Julie Myers, Director of ICE 2006–2008

UFCW later filed a class action suit against the ICE and DHS on Fourth and Fifth Amendment grounds. Judge Mary Lou Robinson (who had earlier denied Swift an injunction against ICE) ruled in 2009 that the class was too vague and that the union had no standing. In 2011, Judge Robinson ruled that most of the workers' claims were without merit, and agreed to the DHS's request for summary judgment.

A group of 18 workers filed a class action suit against Swift for hiring illegal workers in an effort to depress wages. The suit was dismissed in 2009 on the grounds that, because legal and illegal workers could not be clearly separated in retrospect, the relevant class could not be ascertained.

Another lawsuit, filed by workers who were detained but not charged, accuses ICE of racial profiling and sexual harassment of detainees. This case was dismissed in 2009 by federal judge Joan Ericksen, who said that ICE's actions were justified by its search warrant. Judge Ericksen confirmed the legality of racial discrimination during the raid, stating:

As discussed above, the affidavit in support of the warrant indicates that Defendants had evidence that suggested that a large number of illegal aliens were employed at the Worthington plant. This evidence further suggested that those suspected illegal aliens were Latino. In circumstances such as this, the government may properly consider race as a factor relevant to its decisions or actions.

Ericksen also dismissed requests for an injunction against future workplace raids.

== See also ==
- Postville Raid
- Operation Wetback
- Illegal immigration to the United States
- Immigration detention in the United States
