= Lewiston Community Building =

- U.S. National Register of Historic Places
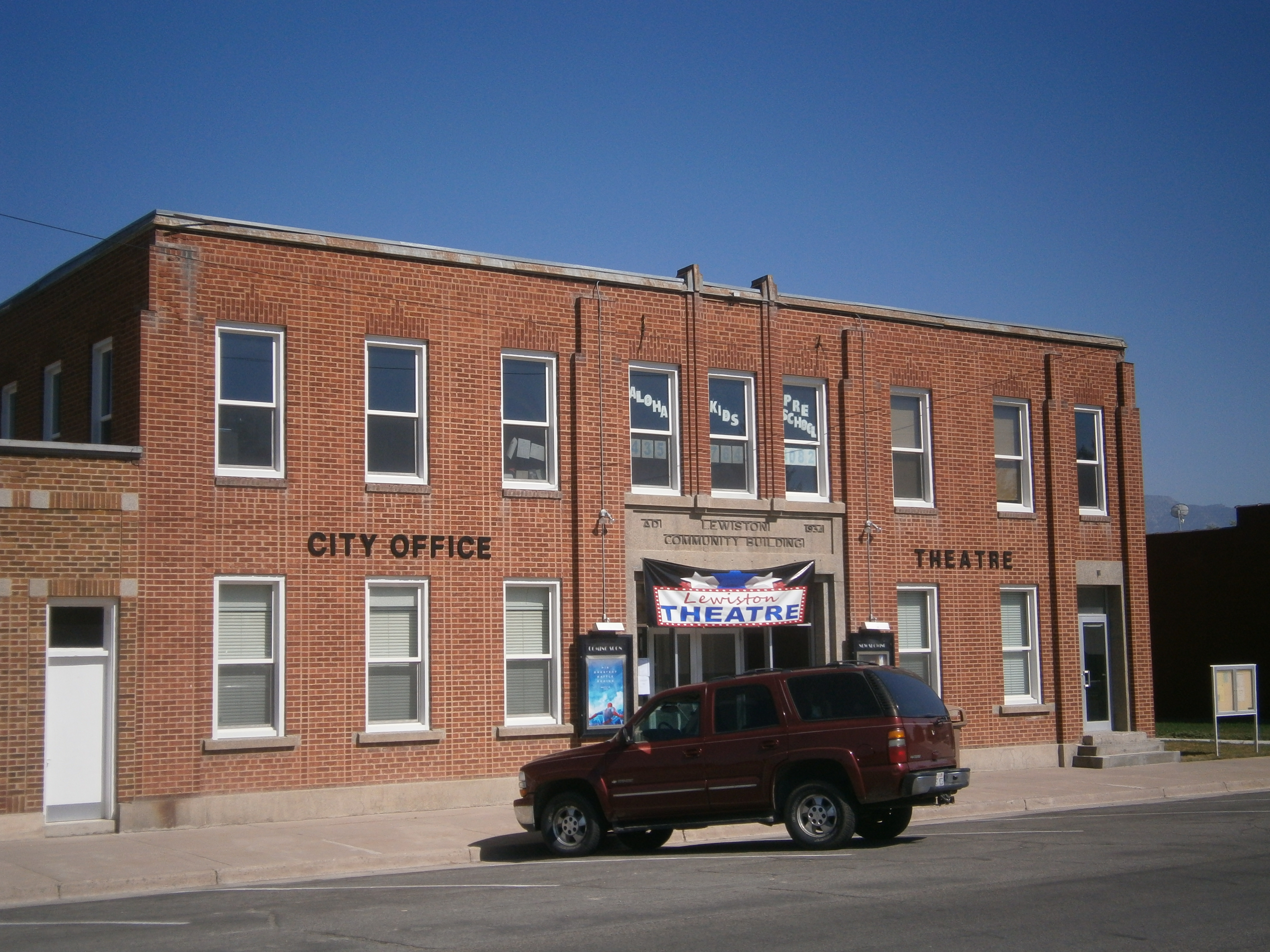
- The building in 2014

- Location within Utah Location within the United States
- Location: 29 South Main Street, Lewiston, Utah
- Coordinates: 41°58′31″N 111°51′20″W
- Area: less than one acre
- Built: 1935
- Architect: Karl C. Schaub
- Architectural style: PWA Moderne
- MPS: Public Works Buildings TR
- NRHP reference No.: 85000799
- Added to NRHP: April 1, 1985

The Lewiston Community Building is a historic building in Lewiston, Utah. It was built in 1935, and designed by Karl C. Schaub. It has been listed on the National Register of Historic Places since April 1, 1985.

It is PWA Moderne in style.
