= Hyrum State Park =

State park in Cache County, Utah, United States

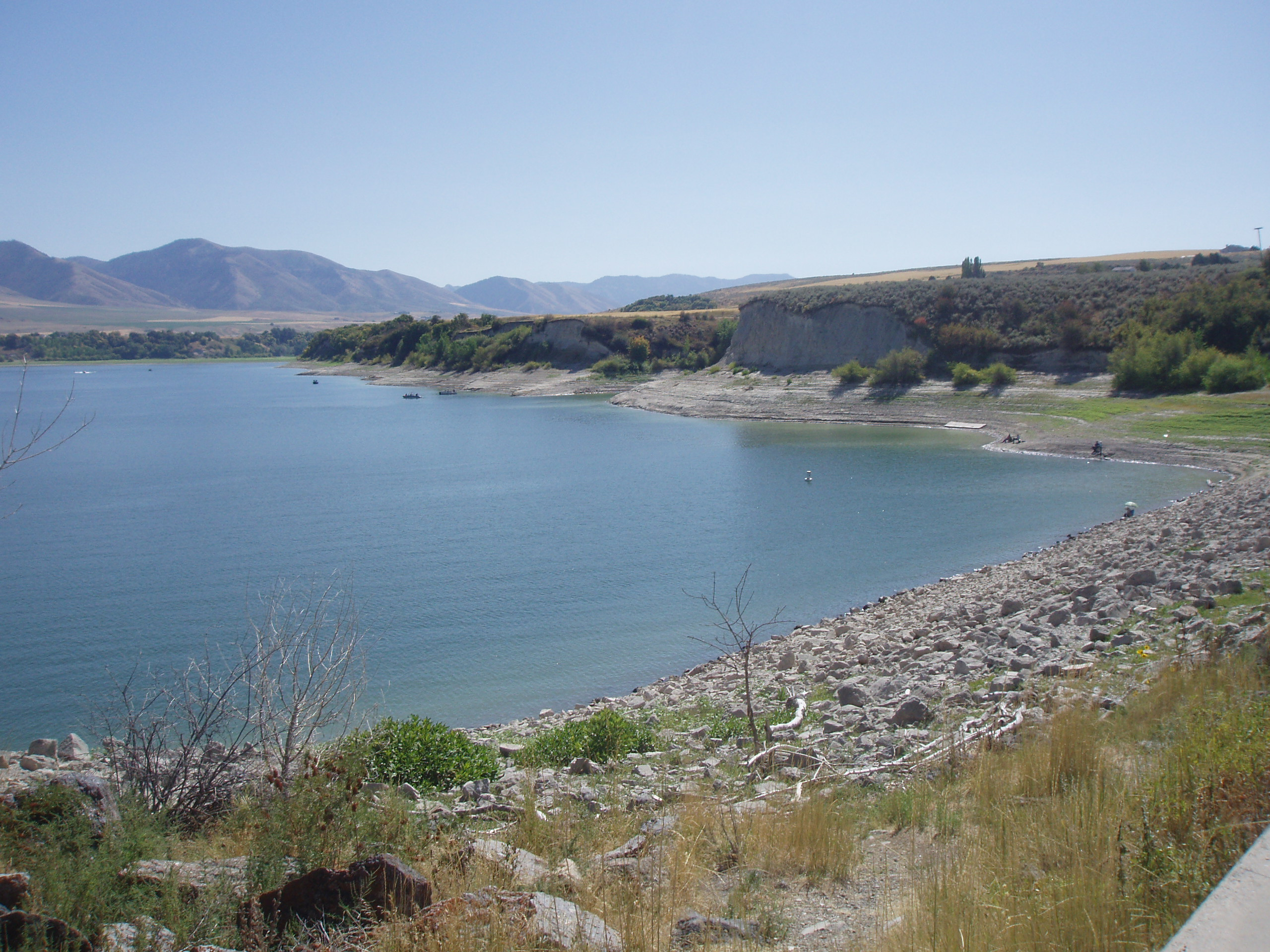

- Location within Utah Location within the United States
- Interactive map of Hyrum State Park
- Location: Cache County, Utah, United States
- Coordinates: 41°37′13″N 111°51′27″W
- Elevation: 4,700 ft (1,400 m)
- Opened: 1959
- Operator: Utah State Parks
- Visitors: 142,268 (in 2025)
- Named for: Hyrum Smith
- Website: Official website
- Utah State Parks

Hyrum State Park is a state park and reservoir in Hyrum, Utah, United States.

== Description ==
Hyrum State Park is in the northeastern part of Utah. It lies at 4,700 feet (1,400 m), and consists of 265 acres (107 ha) surrounding a 450-acre (180 ha) reservoir. The park is used for fishing, boating, camping, picnicking, hiking, waterskiing, and swimming.

The park was named for Hyrum Smith, the brother of LDS church founder Joseph Smith.

Hyrum State Park's facilities are located at the northern shore of the reservoir, and include 31 RV campsites, restrooms, showers, a ranger station, boat ramp, dock, and trailheads.

The dam creating Hyrum Reservoir was completed in April, 1935, by the United States Bureau of Reclamation. Prior to that, local settlers had dug a 9-mile (14 km) canal from the Little Bear River to the town of Hyrum to irrigate their crops.

Fish in the reservoir include yellow perch, channel catfish, rainbow trout, largemouth bass, and bluegill.

== See also ==
- List of Utah State Parks
