= Ingwald C. Thoresen =

American politician (1852–1938)

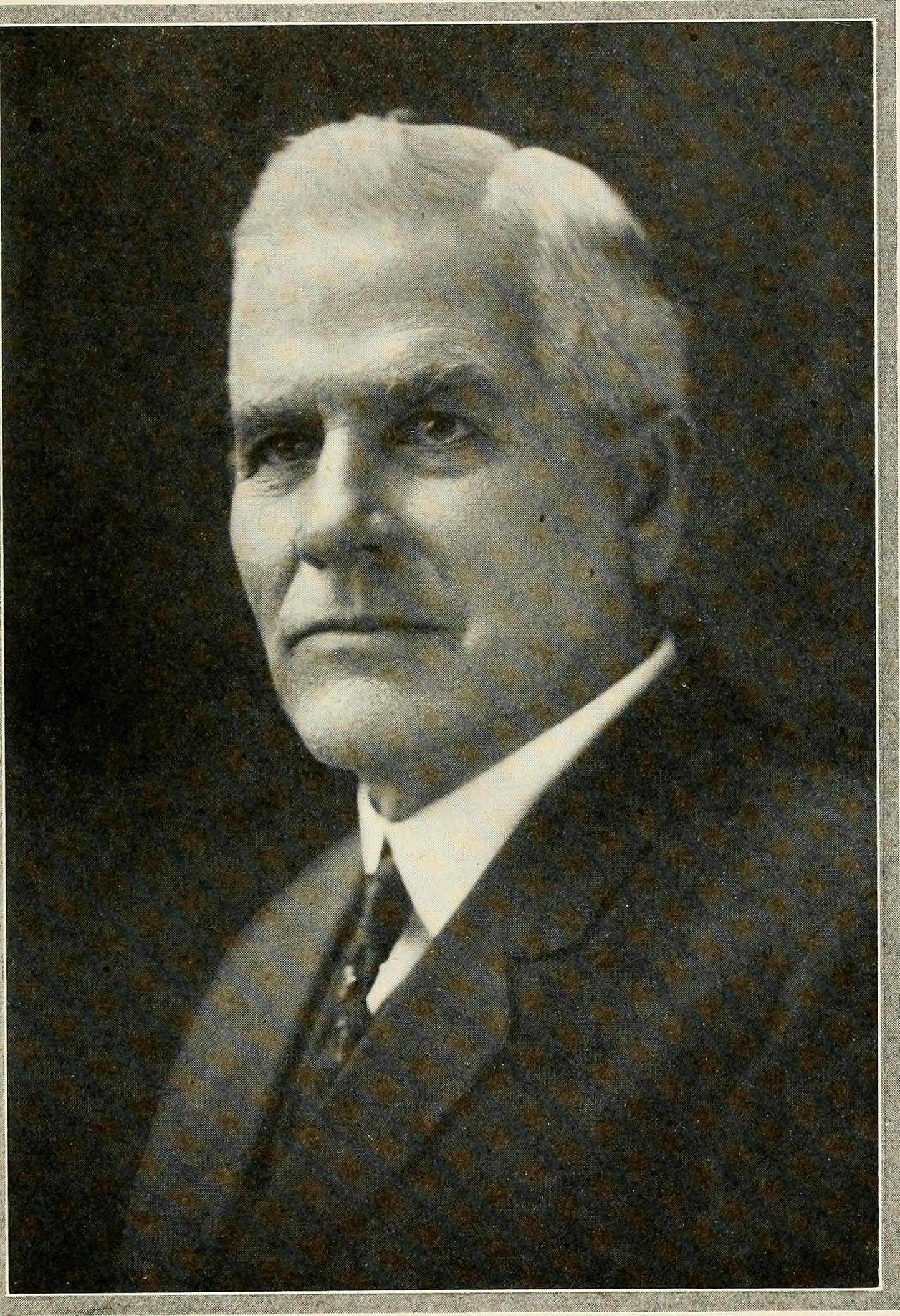

Member of the Utah House of Representatives
- In office 1898–1900

Personal details
- Born: May 2, 1852 Christiania, Norway
- Died: April 15, 1938 (aged 85) Salt Lake City, Utah, U.S.
- Party: Democratic

Ingwald Conrad Thoresen (May 2, 1852 – April 15, 1938) was a Norwegian-born American educator, surveyor, justice, lawyer and politician. He served as a territorial legislator at the Utah Constitutional Conventions of 1882, 1887, and 1895. He also served as a member of the Utah House of Representatives from 1898 to 1900.

== Early life ==
Thoresen was born in Oslo, Norway. His parents joined the Church of Jesus Christ of Latter-day Saints (LDS Church) in 1855, and his father baptized a few hundred people into the church over the next few years. His father was put in prison on multiple occasions for these actions as they were regarded as an affront to the Church of Norway. Thoresen migrated with his family to Utah Territory in 1863 and settled in Hyrum.

== Career ==
From 1876 to 1878, Thoresen was a missionary of the LDS Church in Sweden and Denmark. Over the years, Thoresen served as mayor of Hyrum and as a county prosecutor. He was a delegate to Utah's 1882, 1887 and 1895 Constitutional Conventions. Thoresen was elected as a Democrat to the state legislature and was heavily involved in promoting the Utah Democratic Party.
