= USU Museum of Anthropology =

Anthropology museum at Utah State University

Utah State University Museum of Anthropology
- Established: 1984
- Location: Logan, Utah
- Coordinates: 41°44′27″N 111°48′51″W
- Type: Anthropology
- Website: http://anthromuseum.usu.edu/

The Utah State University Museum of Anthropology is a small museum located in the Old Main building on Utah State University's main campus in Logan, Utah, United States.

== History ==
Begun in the 1960s with a single professor's personal collection of artifacts, the museum took up house in the Old Main building in 1984, first in the basement. It moved upstairs to its present location, in the south turret 2,000-square-foot (190 m^{2}), in 1992.

In 2010, university officials announced a plan to relocate the museum from its current room to its own building, those plans were eventually scrapped and the space in the Welcome Center on campus was reallocated.

== Mission and research ==
The museum has a mission of educating the local public on the fields of anthropology and museum studies. It also serves as a training and research ground for the USU Department of Anthropology. Students may hold internships at the museum and work toward a Museum Studies certificate.

The museum is also home to the popular "Saturdays at the Museum", wherein free family-centered lectures and hands-on activities are held each Saturday throughout the year.
