= Hardware Ranch =

Wildlife management area in Cache County, Utah, United States

Coordinates: 41°36′N 111°34′W

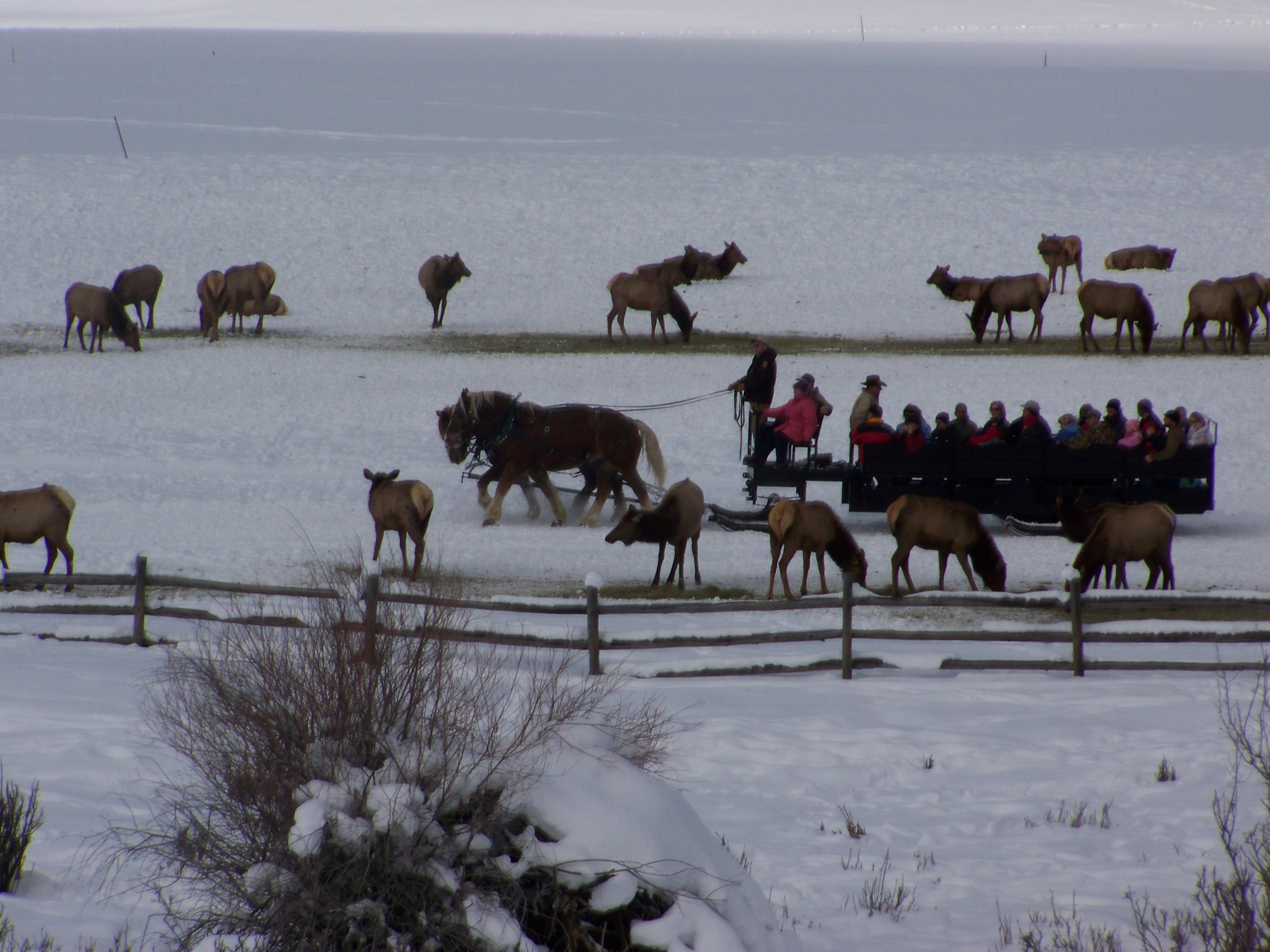
Sleigh ride at Hardware Ranch

Hardware Wildlife Management Area is owned by the State of Utah and managed by the Utah Division of Wildlife Resources. It is located in the Blacksmith Fork Canyon, about 15 mi (24 km) east of Hyrum, Utah. Rocky Mountain elk are fed here through the winter to prevent them from coming to inhabited areas further down the canyon in search of food. Horse-drawn sleigh rides and a visitor center are offered from mid December to February.

== History ==
Hardware Wildlife Management Area (WMA) is owned by the State of Utah and managed by the Utah Division of Wildlife Resources. Neighboring properties are the National Forest, although the actual WMA is not part of the National Forest. Hardware WMA is not a working ranch, it is a WMA set aside primarily for big game animals such as elk, moose and deer but it is also home to many other species. Habitat and wildlife management along with education are the primary focus of management at HWWMA. The elk that visit Hardware WMA are wild elk, they come and go as they please, and are not fenced, farmed or ranched. Cattle and sheep are allowed to graze on the WMA through a competitive contracting process. These animals are limited to certain areas of the WMA and certain time frames to best assist in the habitat management of the WMA.

The state of Utah purchased the ranch in 1946 from the Ernst Lorentz Petersen family estate, who immigrated from Denmark in the 1860s Box Elder Hardware Company, using money from the Wildlife Restoration Act. The original size of the ranch was 7,560 acres (30.6 km^{2}; 11.81 sq mi), but acquisitions by the state enlarged it to about 19,000 acres (77 km^{2}; 30 sq mi). During the first year only 120 Rocky Mountain Elk were fed over the winter, but in 2008 that number is between 500 and 600.
