= Old Main (Utah State University) =

- U.S. National Register of Historic Places
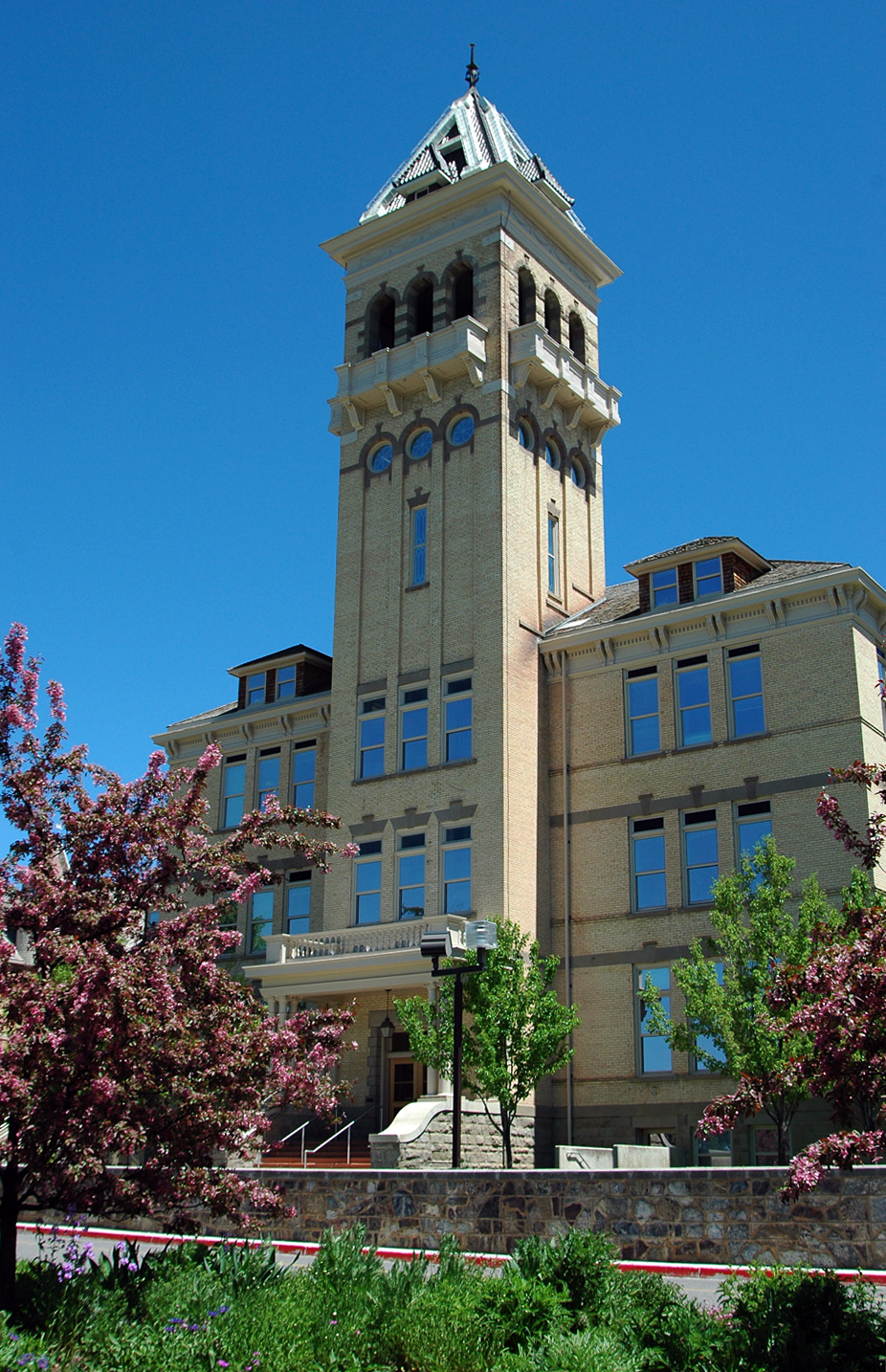
- Old Main, May 2005
- Location: Utah State University; Logan, Utah; United States
- Coordinates: 41°44′27″N 111°48′51″W
- Built: 1890
- Architect: Charles Lawton Thompson; Karl C. Schaub
- Architectural style: Campus Gothic
- NRHP reference No.: 72001258
- Added to NRHP: 1972

Old Main was the first building built on the campus of the Agricultural College of Utah, now Utah State University. It sits at the top of Old Main Hill, overlooking the city of Logan to the west, and facing the quad to the east. Old Main is the oldest functioning academic building in Utah.

== History ==
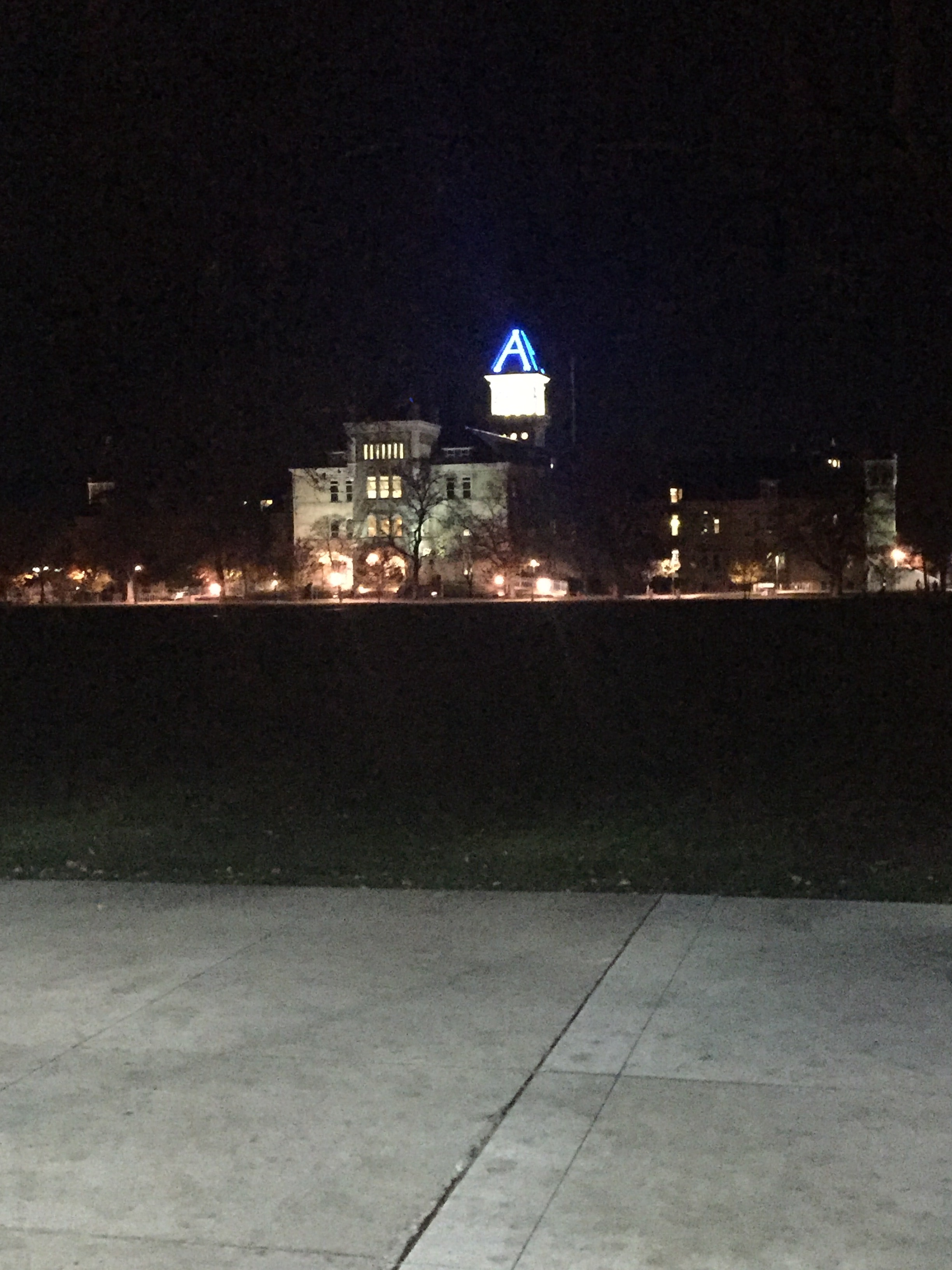
Old Main at night, November 2016

After rejecting a site on the Providence bench south of town, the Board of Trustees for the new college met in Logan on March 26, 1889 to discuss the placement of buildings on a hillside and plot of land donated by the Logan City Council. The Board approved the current site unanimously, and on April 15, selected the proposal of architect C. L. Thompson for a "College Building" to be constructed. Excavation began and the cornerstone was laid on July 27, 1889, and the south wing of the building was completed on February 22, 1890.

The original building cost $20,305 and spanned 270 by 100 feet. The plans were soon redrawn by Logan architect Karl Conrad Schaub, however, and the central wing was expanded substantially, whereas under Thompson's plans, it had served merely as a hallway between the north and south wings. The entirety of the building was finished by 1902, with the front door originally facing west, overlooking the Cache Valley. At this time, the building contained the entirety of the college. Over the years, as campus has expanded, portions of the building have served many purposes, ranging from classrooms to administration to a makeshift hospital during the Spanish flu epidemic in 1919. In its history, the building has housed nearly every department on campus.

A single hand-rung bell was installed in Old Main tower in 1904, and additional bells were added in 1914 and 1915. Though the originals were replaced with an electronic carillon in 1978, the tower continues to chime at 15-minute intervals throughout each day.

Old Main was added to the National Register of Historic Places in 1972. In 1984 the building suffered a major fire, but was completely rehabilitated and restored over a period of about 15 years by Design West Architects of Logan, Utah which was the company founded by Old Main's original architect Karl Schaub nearly 100 years earlier.

=== Current usage ===
In addition to university administration and many central offices, Old Main currently houses the main offices for the College of Humanities and Social Sciences, and many of its departments, such as history, political science, foreign languages, philosophy, sociology, social work, and anthropology. It houses the USU Museum of Anthropology on its second floor.

=== "A" Light ===
The first block "A" light was USU's first senior gift, awarded by the graduating class of 1909. It measures 12 by 14 feet and originally contained 146 candlelight bulbs. The original A was affixed to the west side of the tower, so as to be seen throughout the entire valley, and the remaining three A's were added to the tower in later years. The "A" can be seen for miles around, shining white on most nights, and blue on special nights such as Homecoming and Commencement, and when athletic teams have been victorious.

The A also serves as an alternative to the mountainside letters which represent many colleges and high schools throughout the state of Utah. Various student-led campaigns throughout the university's history have sought to construct a block "A" on one of many nearby mountains, most notably in 1947 and again in the 2000s. A compromise following the 1947 initiative led to the construction of a temporary A on the mountain south of Logan Canyon that was illuminated for special events during the 1950s and '60s, as the state's permanent fixtures were deemed "tacky".

During the summer of 2010 the A was upgraded to use LED technology. Both the white and blue lights are now more brilliant.

== See also ==
- National Register of Historic Places listings in Cache County, Utah
