= Paradise, Utah =

Town in the state of Utah, United States

- Town
- Location in Cache County and the state of Utah.
- Coordinates: 41°34′05″N 111°50′00″W
- Country: United States
- State: Utah
- County: Cache
- Settled: 1860

Area
  - Total: 1.44 sq mi (3.74 km^{2})
  - Land: 1.44 sq mi (3.74 km^{2})
- Elevation: 4,948 ft (1,508 m)

Population (2020)
  - Total: 971
  - Density: 672.4/sq mi (259.63/km^{2})
- Time zone: UTC-7 (Mountain (MST))
  - Summer (DST): UTC-6 (MDT)
- ZIP code: 84328
- Area code: 435
- FIPS code: 49-57850
- GNIS feature ID: 2413112
- Website: Official website

Paradise is a town located in the southern part of Cache County, Utah, United States. The population was 971 at the 2020 census. It is included in the Logan, Utah-Idaho Metropolitan Statistical Area.

== Geography ==
According to the United States Census Bureau, the town has a total area of 1.1 square miles (2.9 km^{2}), all land.

== Demographics ==
Historical population
Census	Pop.	Note	%±
1870	346		—
1880	512		48.0%
1890	637		24.4%
1900	695		9.1%
1910	620		−10.8%
1920	505		−18.5%
1930	433		−14.3%
1940	500		15.5%
1950	401		−19.8%
1960	368		−8.2%
1970	399		8.4%
1980	542		35.8%
1990	561		3.5%
2000	759		35.3%
2010	904		19.1%
2020	971		7.4%
U.S. Decennial Census

As of the census of 2020, there were 971 people and 211 households in the town. The population density was 669.66 inhabitants per square mile (258.56/km^{2}). There were 302 housing units at an average density of 208.3 per square mile (80.4/km^{2}). The racial makeup of the town was 94.75% White, 0.31% Native American, 0.62% Asian, 0.41% Pacific Islander, 0.62% from other races, and 3.3% from two or more races. Hispanic or Latino of any race were 2.1% of the population.

There were 211 households, out of which 34.9% had children under the age of 18 living with them, 75.8% were married couples living together, 16.6% had a female householder with no spouse present, and 6.2% were male householder with no spouse present. The average family size was 3.77.

In the town, the population was spread out, with 27.29% under the age of 19, 2.37% from 20 to 24, 11.74% from 25 to 44, 18.33% from 45 to 64, and 12.6% who were 65 years of age or older. The median age was 37.8 years.

The median income for a household in the town was $74,519, and the median income for a family was $81,250. About 7.7% of the population were below the poverty line, including 9.0% of those under age 18 and 5.7% of those age 65 or over.

== Notable people ==
- Lee Bickmore, businessman and CEO of Nabisco
- Casey Snider, member of the Utah House of Representatives
