= Hyrum, Utah =

City in Utah, United States

- City
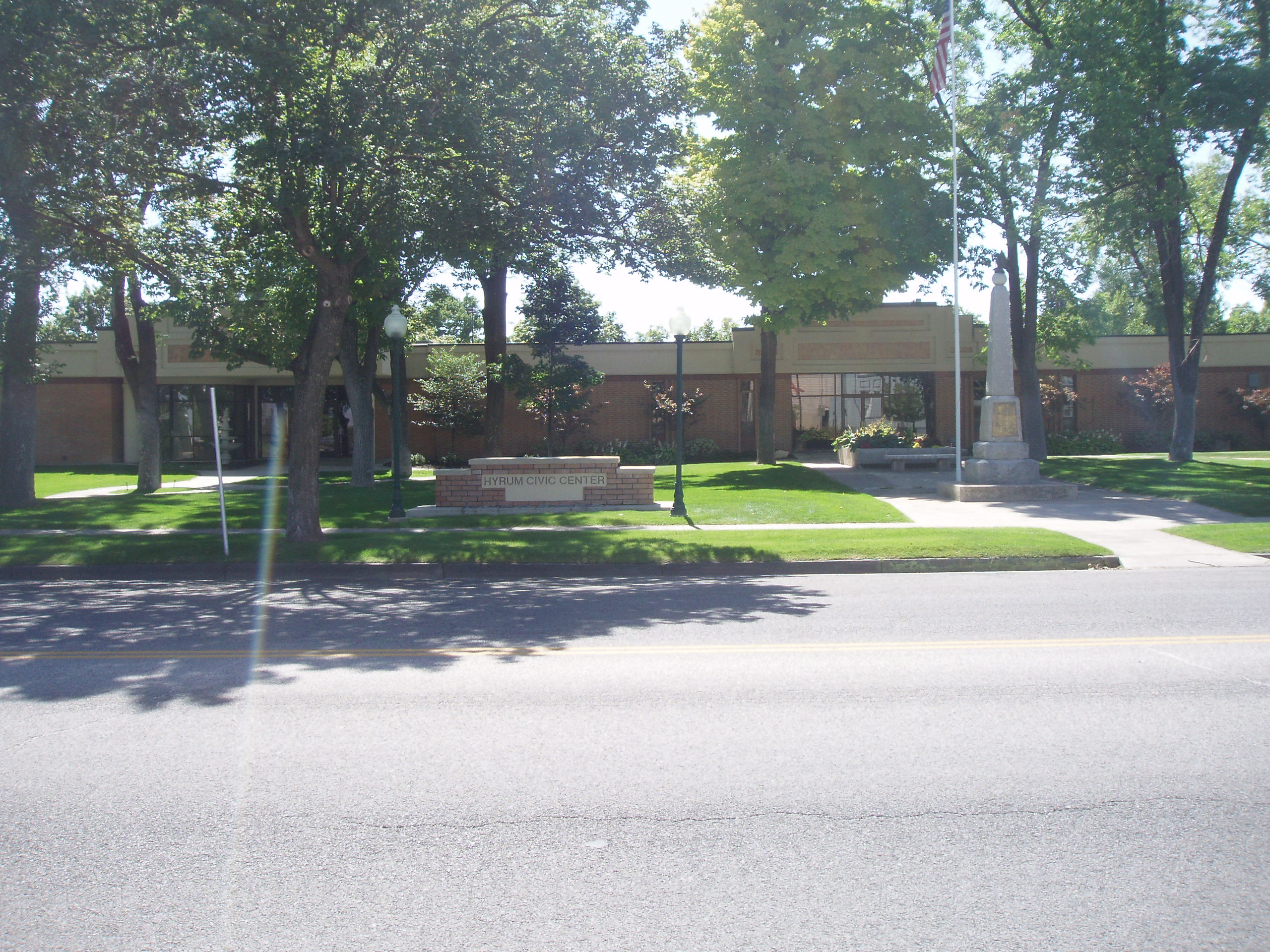
- Hyrum Civic Center

- Location in Cache County and the state of Utah
- Coordinates: 41°38′00″N 111°50′50″W
- Country: United States
- State: Utah
- County: Cache
- Named for: Hyrum Smith

Area
  - Total: 6.19 sq mi (16.03 km^{2})
  - Land: 6.18 sq mi (16.00 km^{2})
  - Water: 0.012 sq mi (0.03 km^{2})
- Elevation: 4,698 ft (1,432 m)

Population (2020)
  - Total: 9,362
  - Density: 1,395.1/sq mi (538.66/km^{2})
- Time zone: UTC-7 (Mountain (MST))
  - Summer (DST): UTC-6 (MDT)
- ZIP code: 84319
- Area code: 435
- FIPS code: 49-37500
- GNIS feature ID: 2410088
- Website: www.hyrumcity.gov

Hyrum is a city in Cache County, Utah. The population was 9,362 at the time of the 2020 census. It is included in the Logan metropolitan statistical area.

It is home to Hyrum State Park, Hardware Ranch, and Porcupine Reservoir.

== History ==
Hyrum was founded in 1860 by a group of 23 families, mainly either Danish immigrants or sons of Ezra T. Benson. Benson organized an LDS ward there in May 1860. The town got a post office in 1861. By 1900 the population had grown to the point that the ward was divided in three. Hyrum had 1,869 inhabitants in 1930.

On December 12, 2006, U.S. Immigration and Customs Enforcement (I.C.E) staged a coordinated predawn raid at E.A. Miller, a meat packing plant in Hyrum, and at five other Swift & Company plants located in the western United States, interviewing workers and hauling off hundreds in buses.

On December 30, 2017, an elementary-school art teacher was reprimanded, and eventually terminated, after showing classical nude images in the classroom setting. The images were from materials provided by the school.

== Geography ==
Hyrum is located near the southern end of the Cache Valley and is bordered to the southwest by Hyrum Reservoir.

According to the United States Census Bureau, the city has a total area of 4.8 square miles (12.5 km^{2}), of which 0.01 square miles (0.03 km^{2}), or 0.26%, is water.

=== Climate ===
This climatic region is typified by large seasonal temperature differences, with warm to hot (and often humid) summers and cold (sometimes severely cold) winters. According to the Köppen Climate Classification system, Hyrum has a humid continental climate, abbreviated "Dfb" on climate maps.

== Demographics ==
Historical population
| Census | Pop. | Note | %± |
|---|---|---|---|
| 1870 | 708 | | — |
| 1880 | 1,234 | | 74.3% |
| 1890 | 1,423 | | 15.3% |
| 1900 | 1,652 | | 16.1% |
| 1910 | 1,833 | | 11.0% |
| 1920 | 1,858 | | 1.4% |
| 1930 | 1,869 | | 0.6% |
| 1940 | 1,874 | | 0.3% |
| 1950 | 1,704 | | −9.1% |
| 1960 | 1,728 | | 1.4% |
| 1970 | 2,340 | | 35.4% |
| 1980 | 3,952 | | 68.9% |
| 1990 | 4,829 | | 22.2% |
| 2000 | 6,316 | | 30.8% |
| 2010 | 7,609 | | 20.5% |
| 2020 | 9,362 | | 23.0% |
U.S. Decennial Census

=== 2020 census ===
As of the 2020 census, Hyrum had a population of 9,362. The median age was 28.6 years. 35.7% of residents were under the age of 18 and 10.1% of residents were 65 years of age or older. For every 100 females there were 101.1 males, and for every 100 females age 18 and over there were 98.8 males age 18 and over.

98.1% of residents lived in urban areas, while 1.9% lived in rural areas.

There were 2,718 households in Hyrum, of which 50.6% had children under the age of 18 living in them. Of all households, 69.4% were married-couple households, 11.2% were households with a male householder and no spouse or partner present, and 15.9% were households with a female householder and no spouse or partner present. About 13.4% of all households were made up of individuals and 6.8% had someone living alone who was 65 years of age or older.

There were 2,804 housing units, of which 3.1% were vacant. The homeowner vacancy rate was 0.5% and the rental vacancy rate was 5.5%.

Racial composition as of the 2020 census
| Race | Number | Percent |
|---|---|---|
| White | 7,598 | 81.2% |
| Black or African American | 26 | 0.3% |
| American Indian and Alaska Native | 86 | 0.9% |
| Asian | 75 | 0.8% |
| Native Hawaiian and Other Pacific Islander | 66 | 0.7% |
| Some other race | 853 | 9.1% |
| Two or more races | 658 | 7.0% |
| Hispanic or Latino (of any race) | 1,548 | 16.5% |

=== 2010 census ===
The population was 7,609 at the 2010 census.

=== 2000 census ===
As of the 2000 census, there were 6,316 people, 1,683 households, and 1,497 families residing in the city. The population density was 1,617.2 inhabitants per square mile (624.4/km^{2}). There were 1,744 housing units at an average density of 446.5 per square mile (172.4/km^{2}). The racial makeup of the city was 88.58% White, 0.19% African American, 0.74% Native American, 0.17% Asian, 0.19% Pacific Islander, 8.36% from other races, and 1.76% from two or more races. 13.47% of the population were Hispanic or Latino of any race.

There were 1,683 households, out of which 59.7% had children under the age of 18 living with them, 76.8% were married couples living together, 9.2% had a female householder with no husband present, and 11.0% were non-families. 9.0% of all households were made up of individuals, and 3.6% had someone living alone who was 65 years of age or older. The average household size was 3.75 and the average family size was 4.00.

In the city, the population was spread out, with 40.4% under the age of 18, 11.6% from 18 to 24, 27.6% from 25 to 44, 15.2% from 45 to 64, and 5.2% who were 65 years of age or older. The median age was 24 years. For every 100 females there were 103.5 males. For every 100 females age 18 and over, there were 100.2 males.

The median income for a household in the city was $43,981, and the median income for a family was $44,915. Males had a median income of $31,989 versus $20,770 for females. The per capita income for the city was $14,845. 6.5% of the population and 5.2% of families were below the poverty line. Out of the total population, 8.5% of those under the age of 18 and 3.7% of those 65 and older were living below the poverty line.

== Points of interest ==
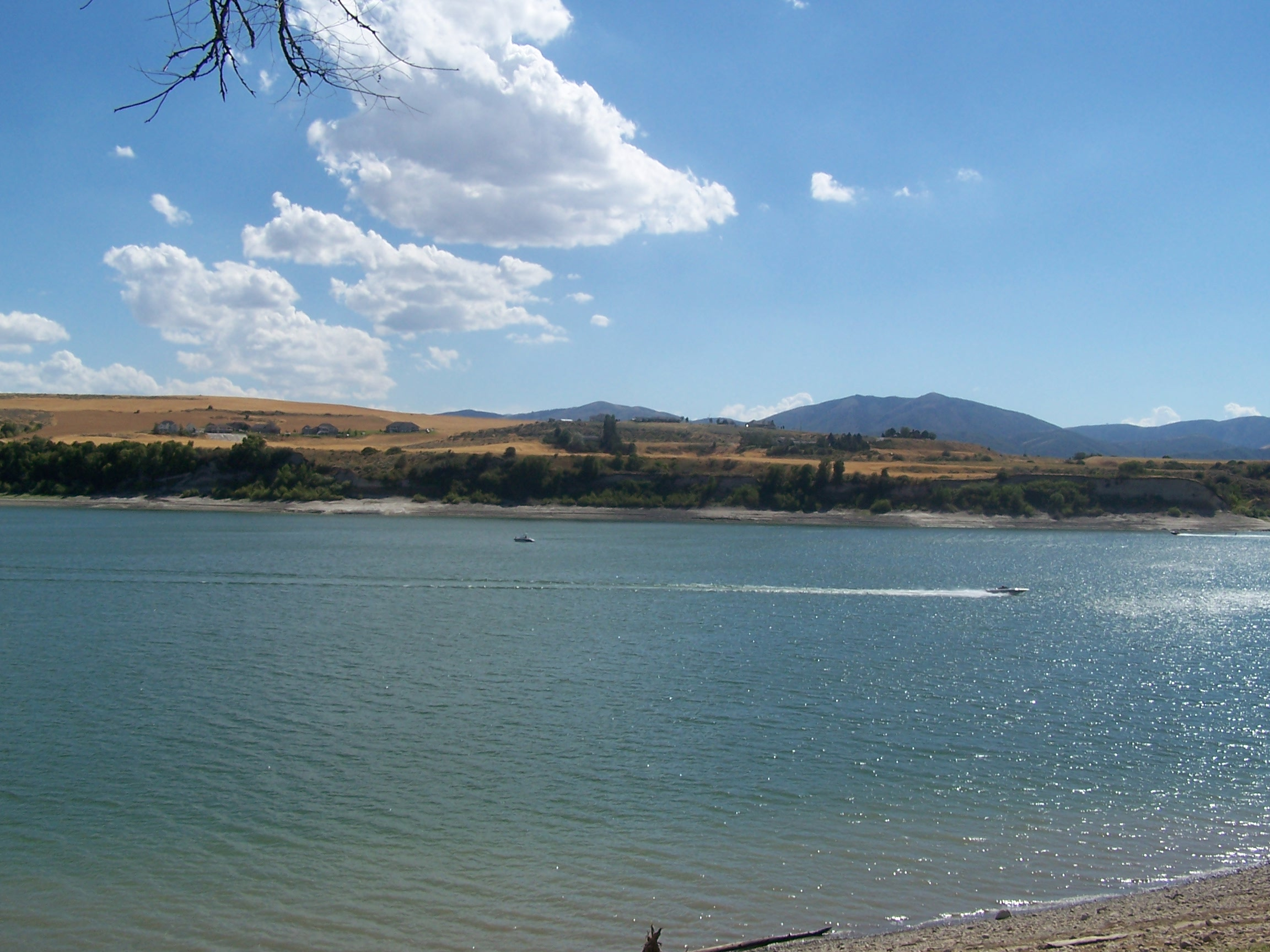
Hyrum Reservoir, August 2007

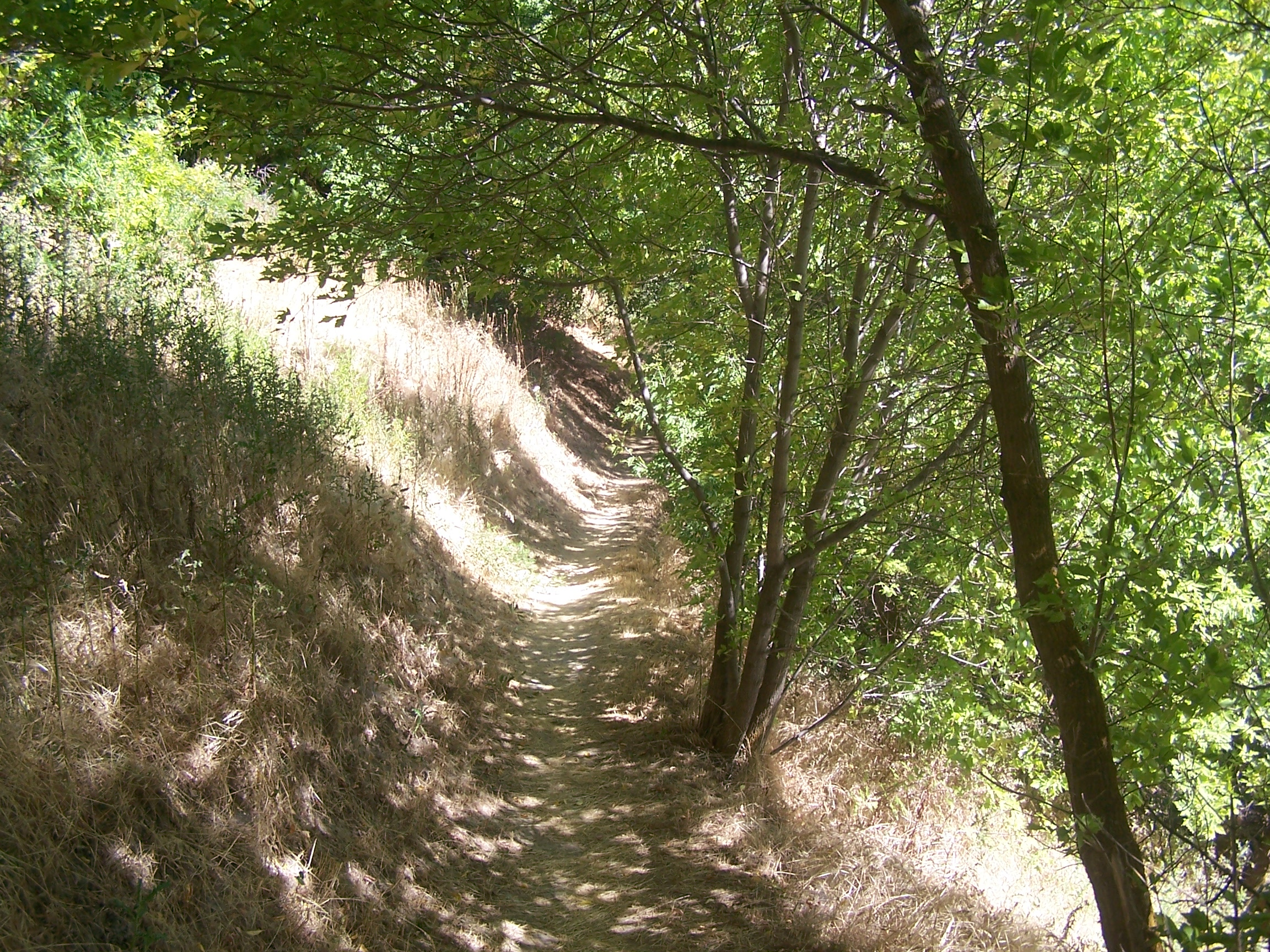
Short trail in Hyrum State Park

=== Hyrum State Park ===
Hyrum, Utah is the home of Hyrum State Park which is located on Hyrum Reservoir and is popular for fishing, water skiing, swimming, and camping.

Hyrum State Park offers many recreational opportunities including fishing, boating, and camping. Surrounded by tall, shady trees, Hyrum Reservoir provides an excellent place for an afternoon picnic, or to spend the weekend trolling on the lake catching yellow perch, rainbow trout, bluegill, and largemouth bass.

Hyrum State Park offers live camera views that can be seen online.

=== Hardware Ranch ===
Herds of elk spend the winter months at Hardware Ranch, which is reached by travelling east from Hyrum up Blacksmith Fork Canyon. The ranch is part of a wildlife management area, and sleigh rides are offered that take visitors into the herd.

== Notable people ==
- Hadley Cantril, psychologist
- Jake Kuresa, NFL player
- Dean L. Larsen, leader in the Church of Jesus Christ of Latter-day Saints
- Chase Nielsen, United States Air Force officer and prisoner of war
- Ingwald C. Thoresen, former member of the Utah House of Representatives
- Hans Wight, politician who served in the Legislative Assembly of Alberta
- Keith W. Wilcox, leader in the Church of Jesus Christ of Latter-day Saints

== See also ==
- List of cities and towns in Utah
