= National Register of Historic Places listings in Cache County, Utah =

Location of Cache County in Utah

This is a list of the National Register of Historic Places listings in Cache County, Utah.

This is intended to be a complete list of the properties and districts on the National Register of Historic Places in Cache County, Utah, United States. Latitude and longitude coordinates are provided for many National Register properties and districts; these locations may be seen together in a map.

There are 78 properties and districts listed on the National Register in the county. Another 6 sites in the county were once listed, but have since been removed.

This National Park Service list is complete through NPS recent listings posted August 28, 2026.

== Current listings ==
	Name on the Register	Image	Date listed	Location	City or town	Description
1	George Washington Baker House	George Washington Baker House	February 10, 1983 (#83004416)	115 N. 100 West; 41°42′37″N 111°58′44″W	Mendon	
2	Samuel Baker House		March 31, 1983 (#83004417)	150 W. 200 North; 41°42′45″N 111°58′50″W	Mendon	Stone house with vernacular Greek Revival styling, built in 1870s.
3	Heber K. and Rachel H. Bankhead House	Heber K. and Rachel H. Bankhead House	March 21, 1997 (#97000261)	185 E. 800 South; 41°37′20″N 111°55′49″W	Wellsville	
4	William & Elizabeth Barrett Farmstead	William & Elizabeth Barrett Farmstead	February 19, 2008 (#08000057)	20 S. 100 West; 41°42′27″N 111°58′42″W	Mendon	
5	Bell-Johnson House	Bell-Johnson House	October 8, 2004 (#04001118)	12 N. 200 East; 41°55′30″N 111°48′05″W	Richmond	
6	Borden Company Plant	Borden Company Plant	September 20, 2021 (#100006935)	290 South 400 West; 41°43′35″N 111°50′43″W	Logan	
7	George Bradshaw House and Joshua Salisbury/George Bradshaw Barn	George Bradshaw House and Joshua Salisbury/George Bradshaw Barn	November 19, 1982 (#82004846)	73 S. Center St. 41°38′16″N 111°56′05″W	Wellsville	
8	James and Amy Burnham Farmstead	James and Amy Burnham Farmstead	October 8, 2004 (#04001120)	533 S. State St. 41°54′46″N 111°48′27″W	Richmond	
9	Carl F. and Sophia Christensen House	Carl F. and Sophia Christensen House	October 8, 2004 (#04001121)	208 N. 200 East; 41°55′38″N 111°48′06″W	Richmond	
10	Clarkston Tithing Granary	Clarkston Tithing Granary	January 25, 1985 (#85000250)	10212 N. 8700 West; 41°55′12″N 112°03′11″W	Clarkston	Granary building. This was moved a few blocks in 2018.
11	Crockett House	Crockett House	April 27, 2009 (#09000017)	82 Crockett Ave. 41°44′04″N 111°48′44″W	Logan	
12	Dale's Sinclair Service Station		July 16, 2026 (#100013212)	96 E. Center Street; 41°43′52″N 111°49′58″W	Logan	
13	Douglas General Mercantile	Douglas General Mercantile	August 4, 1982 (#82004113)	100 S. Main St. 41°50′03″N 111°49′54″W	Smithfield	
14	David Eccles House	David Eccles House	July 30, 1976 (#76001811)	250 W. Center St. 41°43′52″N 111°50′26″W	Logan	
15	Elite Hall	Elite Hall	August 4, 2003 (#03000736)	98 W. Main St. 41°38′04″N 111°51′25″W	Hyrum	
16	Samuel and Lana Ewing House	Samuel and Lana Ewing House	January 28, 1994 (#93001576)	107 S. 100 East; 41°50′02″N 111°49′46″W	Smithfield	
17	Forster Hotel	Forster Hotel	February 19, 2008 (#08000058)	176 N. 100 West; 41°42′40″N 111°58′41″W	Mendon	
18	James Gardner House	James Gardner House	February 11, 1982 (#82004111)	173 N. Main St. 41°42′39″N 111°58′34″W	Mendon	
19	Soren Hanson House	Soren Hanson House	February 11, 1982 (#82004109)	166 W. Main St. 41°38′04″N 111°51′33″W	Hyrum	
20	Martin Harris Gravesite	Martin Harris Gravesite	November 28, 1980 (#80003890)	8400 W. 11000 North; 41°55′53″N 112°02′20″W	Clarkston	
21	Hatch's Camp		December 27, 2006 (#06001192)	8.3 miles (13.4 km) east from the mouth of Logan Canyon; 41°46′32″N 111°38′57″W	Cache National Forest	
22	Hendricks Confectionery Building	Hendricks Confectionery Building	October 8, 2004 (#04001122)	19 W. Main St. 41°55′21″N 111°48′31″W	Richmond	
23	Lafayette and Elizabeth W. Hendricks House	Lafayette and Elizabeth W. Hendricks House	October 8, 2004 (#04001123)	109 S. State St. 41°55′13″N 111°48′27″W	Richmond	
24	William S. and Margaret R. Hendricks House	William S. and Margaret R. Hendricks House	October 8, 2004 (#04001124)	112 W. Main St. 41°55′23″N 111°48′40″W	Richmond	
25	Hobson-Hill House	Hobson-Hill House	October 8, 2004 (#04001125)	108 S. 100 West; 41°55′13″N 111°48′40″W	Richmond	
26	Home Economics/Commons Building	Home Economics/Commons Building	April 1, 1985 (#85000800)	Off U.S. Route 89 on the Utah State University campus 41°44′25″N 111°48′40″W	Logan	
27	Howell-Theurer House	Howell-Theurer House	October 18, 1979 (#79002490)	30 S. 100 East; 41°38′16″N 111°55′49″W	Wellsville	Boyhood home of Joseph Howell
28	Hyrum First Ward Meetinghouse	Hyrum First Ward Meetinghouse	February 15, 1980 (#80003891)	290 S. Center St. 41°37′41″N 111°51′19″W	Hyrum	
29	John P. and Sarah James House	John P. and Sarah James House	January 28, 1994 (#93001578)	210 W. 9000 South; 41°34′06″N 111°50′17″W	Paradise	
30	Morgan A. and Clarissa R. Knapp House	Morgan A. and Clarissa R. Knapp House	October 8, 2004 (#04001126)	106 S. 100 East; 41°55′13″N 111°48′19″W	Richmond	
31	John E. Lee House	John E. Lee House	February 11, 1982 (#82004108)	123 W. Center St. 41°28′33″N 111°29′32″W	Hyde Park	
32	Lewiston Community Building	Lewiston Community Building	April 1, 1985 (#85000799)	29 S. Main St. 41°58′31″N 111°51′20″W	Lewiston	
33	Lewiston Tithing Office and Granary	Lewiston Tithing Office and Granary	January 25, 1985 (#85000252)	81 E. 800 South; 41°57′42″N 111°51′14″W	Lewiston	
34	Logan Center Street Historic District	Logan Center Street Historic District	April 26, 1979 (#79002488)	Roughly bounded by 200 North, 200 South, 200 East, and 600 West; 41°43′56″N 111°50′18″W	Logan	
35	Logan Fish Hatchery Caretaker's Residence	Logan Fish Hatchery Caretaker's Residence	April 1, 1985 (#85000801)	1469 W. 200 North; 41°44′10″N 111°52′08″W	Logan	
36	Logan High School Gymnasium		August 7, 1985 (#85001844)	162 W. 100 South; 41°43′44″N 111°50′16″W	Logan	
37	Logan LDS Sixth Ward Church	Logan LDS Sixth Ward Church	July 17, 1979 (#79002489)	395 S. Main St. 41°43′27″N 111°50′06″W	Logan	
38	Logan Municipal Slaughterhouse	Logan Municipal Slaughterhouse	April 1, 1985 (#85000802)	265 N. 600 West; 41°44′13″N 111°50′59″W	Logan	No longer extant.
39	Logan Tabernacle	Logan Tabernacle	October 10, 1975 (#75001800)	Bounded by Center, 1st North, Main, and 1st East Sts. 41°43′56″N 111°50′00″W	Logan	
40	Logan Temple	Logan Temple	November 20, 1975 (#75001801)	Between 2nd and 3rd East and 1st and 2nd North; 41°44′03″N 111°49′38″W	Logan	
41	Logan Temple Barn	Logan Temple Barn	December 19, 1985 (#85003199)	368 E. 200 North; 41°44′06″N 111°49′27″W	Logan	
42	McMurdie-White Farmstead	McMurdie-White Farmstead	September 28, 2005 (#05001106)	395 W. 9000 South; 41°34′10″N 111°50′47″W	Paradise	
43	Mendon Station	Mendon Station	February 19, 2008 (#08000059)	95 N. Main St. 41°42′34″N 111°58′34″W	Mendon	
44	Louis Edgar and Clara H. Merrill House	Louis Edgar and Clara H. Merrill House	October 8, 2004 (#04001127)	244 W. Main St. 41°55′23″N 111°48′53″W	Richmond	
45	Samuel Crowthers Mitton House	Samuel Crowthers Mitton House	November 19, 1982 (#82004847)	242 E. Main St. 41°38′18″N 111°55′36″W	Wellsville	
46	Hattie Merrill Morrison Farmstead	Hattie Merrill Morrison Farmstead	October 8, 2004 (#04001128)	1367 S. State St. 41°53′48″N 111°48′34″W	Richmond	
47	Muir House	Muir House	April 4, 2008 (#08000060)	145 S. Main St. 41°42′17″N 111°58′36″W	Mendon	
48	Newton Reservoir		November 30, 1973 (#73001860)	3 miles (4.8 km) north of Newton; 41°54′36″N 112°00′18″W	Newton	
49	Old Main, Utah State University	Old Main, Utah State University	February 23, 1972 (#72001258)	Utah State University campus 41°44′27″N 111°48′47″W	Logan	
50	Erick Lehi and Ingrid Larsen Olson House	Erick Lehi and Ingrid Larsen Olson House	March 8, 1997 (#97000225)	490 E. 600 South; 41°43′18″N 111°49′19″W	River Heights	
51	Paradise Tithing Office	Paradise Tithing Office	January 25, 1985 (#85000253)	8970 S. 200 West; 41°34′09″N 111°50′14″W	Paradise	
52	Martin and Martha Pond Farmstead	Martin and Martha Pond Farmstead	November 17, 1997 (#97001308)	320 S. 800 West; 41°58′13″N 111°52′11″W	Lewiston	
53	Providence Historic District	Providence Historic District	November 9, 2007 (#07001169)	Roughly bounded by 200 N., 400 E., 500 S., and 200 W. 41°42′18″N 111°48′56″W	Providence	
54	Providence LDS Chapel and Meetinghouse	Providence LDS Chapel and Meetinghouse	February 11, 1982 (#82004112)	10 S. Main St. 41°42′28″N 111°49′00″W	Providence	
55	Richmond Carnegie Library	Richmond Carnegie Library	October 25, 1984 (#84000147)	38 W. Main St. 41°55′23″N 111°48′32″W	Richmond	
56	Richmond City Grandstand & Baseball Field	Richmond City Grandstand & Baseball Field	April 29, 2005 (#04001130)	Approximately 50 S. State St. 41°55′17″N 111°48′34″W	Richmond	
57	Richmond Community Building	Richmond Community Building	April 9, 1986 (#86000731)	6 W. Main St. 41°55′23″N 111°48′30″W	Richmond	
58	Richmond Interurban Depot	Richmond Interurban Depot	May 16, 2002 (#02000508)	196 W. Main St. 41°54′51″N 111°48′48″W	Richmond	
59	Richmond Relief Society Hall	Richmond Relief Society Hall	June 7, 1996 (#96000589)	15 E. Main St. 41°55′31″N 111°48′27″W	Richmond	
60	Richmond Tithing Office	Richmond Tithing Office	January 25, 1985 (#85000256)	31 S. State St. 41°55′20″N 111°48′27″W	Richmond	
61	Zial Riggs House	Zial Riggs House	February 11, 1982 (#82004114)	94 S. 100 East; 41°38′13″N 111°55′49″W	Wellsville	
62	River Heights Sinclair Station	River Heights Sinclair Station	June 12, 2017 (#100001077)	594 S. 400 East; 41°43′18″N 111°49′32″W	River Heights	
63	Sigma Chi Fraternity House	Sigma Chi Fraternity House	September 15, 2005 (#05001038)	705 N. 800 East; 41°44′42″N 111°48′52″W	Logan	
64	William McNeil Smith House	William McNeil Smith House	February 11, 1982 (#82004110)	116 S. 100 East; 41°43′44″N 111°49′53″W	Logan	
65	Smithfield Public Library	Smithfield Public Library	February 17, 1981 (#81000580)	25 N. Main St. 41°50′14″N 111°49′13″W	Smithfield	
66	Smithfield Tabernacle-Youth Center	Smithfield Tabernacle-Youth Center	January 17, 2017 (#100000509)	25 N. Main St. 41°50′13″N 111°49′59″W	Smithfield	
67	Smithfield Tithing Office	Smithfield Tithing Office	January 25, 1985 (#85000258)	35 W. Center St. 41°50′13″N 111°49′58″W	Smithfield	
68	Spence Confectionery and Dance Hall		March 23, 2026 (#100012848)	85 E. Main Street; 41°38′20″N 111°55′55″W	Wellsville	
69	Tony Grove Ranger Station Historic District	Tony Grove Ranger Station Historic District	April 13, 1992 (#92000338)	U.S. Route 89, 23 miles (37 km) northeast of Logan in the Wasatch-Cache National Forest; 41°53′08″N 111°33′59″W	Cache National Forest	
70	William Jr. and Caroline Watterson House		September 17, 2021 (#100006917)	449 West 100 North; 41°44′01″N 111°50′47″W	Logan	
71	S. Milton and Alba C. Webb House	S. Milton and Alba C. Webb House	October 8, 2004 (#04001131)	143 S. State St. 41°55′11″N 111°48′27″W	Richmond	
72	Wellsville Relief Society Meeting House	Wellsville Relief Society Meeting House	February 13, 1989 (#88003439)	67 S. Center St. 41°38′17″N 111°56′02″W	Wellsville	
73	Wellsville Tabernacle	Wellsville Tabernacle	November 26, 1980 (#80003893)	75 S. 100 East; 41°38′15″N 111°55′55″W	Wellsville	
74	James F. & Mary Jane Whitney House	James F. & Mary Jane Whitney House	February 19, 2008 (#08000061)	195 W. 100 North; 41°42′38″N 111°58′51″W	Mendon	
75	Whittier School	Whittier School	September 8, 2000 (#00001066)	290 N. 400 East; 41°44′12″N 111°49′24″W	Logan	
76	James G. Willie House	James G. Willie House	April 13, 1983 (#83004418)	97 N. 100 West; 41°42′35″N 111°58′44″W	Mendon	
77	Women's Residence Hall	Women's Residence Hall	April 9, 1986 (#86000735)	Utah State University; 41°44′27″N 111°48′31″W	Logan	Demolished in 2013.
78	Ferdinand Zollinger, Jr. House	Ferdinand Zollinger, Jr. House	July 16, 1992 (#92000892)	193 N. 100 East; 41°42′42″N 111°48′53″W	Providence	

== Former listings ==
	Name on the Register	Image	Date listed	Date removed	Location	City or town	Description
1	Benson Elementary School		April 1, 1985 (#85000798)	December 29, 2025	3440 N. 3000 West; 41°47′45″N 111°54′17″W	Benson	Demolished between 1993 and 2002
2	Holley-Globe Grain and Milling Company Elevator	Holley-Globe Grain and Milling Company Elevator	October 24, 1985 (#85003386)	September 10, 2020	100 North and Center St. 41°38′11″N 111°51′14″W	Hyrum	Disassembled and relocated to a bank in Hyrum in 2019.
3	Hyrum Stake Tithing Office	Hyrum Stake Tithing Office	January 25, 1985 (#85000251)	March 29, 2018	26 W. Main St. 41°38′04″N 111°51′18″W	Hyrum	
4	Lindquist Hall		March 27, 1980 (#80003892)	April 17, 1986	201 N. 100 East	Logan	
5	Mendon Elementary School		April 1, 1985 (#85000803)	February 1, 1995	Off State Route 23; 41°42′29″N 111°58′34″W	Mendon	
6	Plant Auto Company Building	Plant Auto Company Building	October 8, 2004 (#04001129)	March 26, 2018	38 S. 200 West (State Route 91); 41°55′20″N 111°48′51″W	Richmond	No longer standing, this one-part Victorian Eclectic commercial block was built in 1916 and housed the first automobile repair shop in Richmond

== See also ==
- List of National Historic Landmarks in Utah
- National Register of Historic Places listings in Utah
