= Bankhead House =

Bankhead House may refer to:

- Bankhead House (Jasper, Alabama), listed on the National Register of Historic Places in Jasper, Alabama
- James Greer Bankhead House, listed on the National Register of Historic Places in Sulligent, Alabama
- Heber K. and Rachel H. Bankhead House, listed on the National Register of Historic Places in Wellsville, Utah
