= Howell-Theurer House =

- U.S. National Register of Historic Places
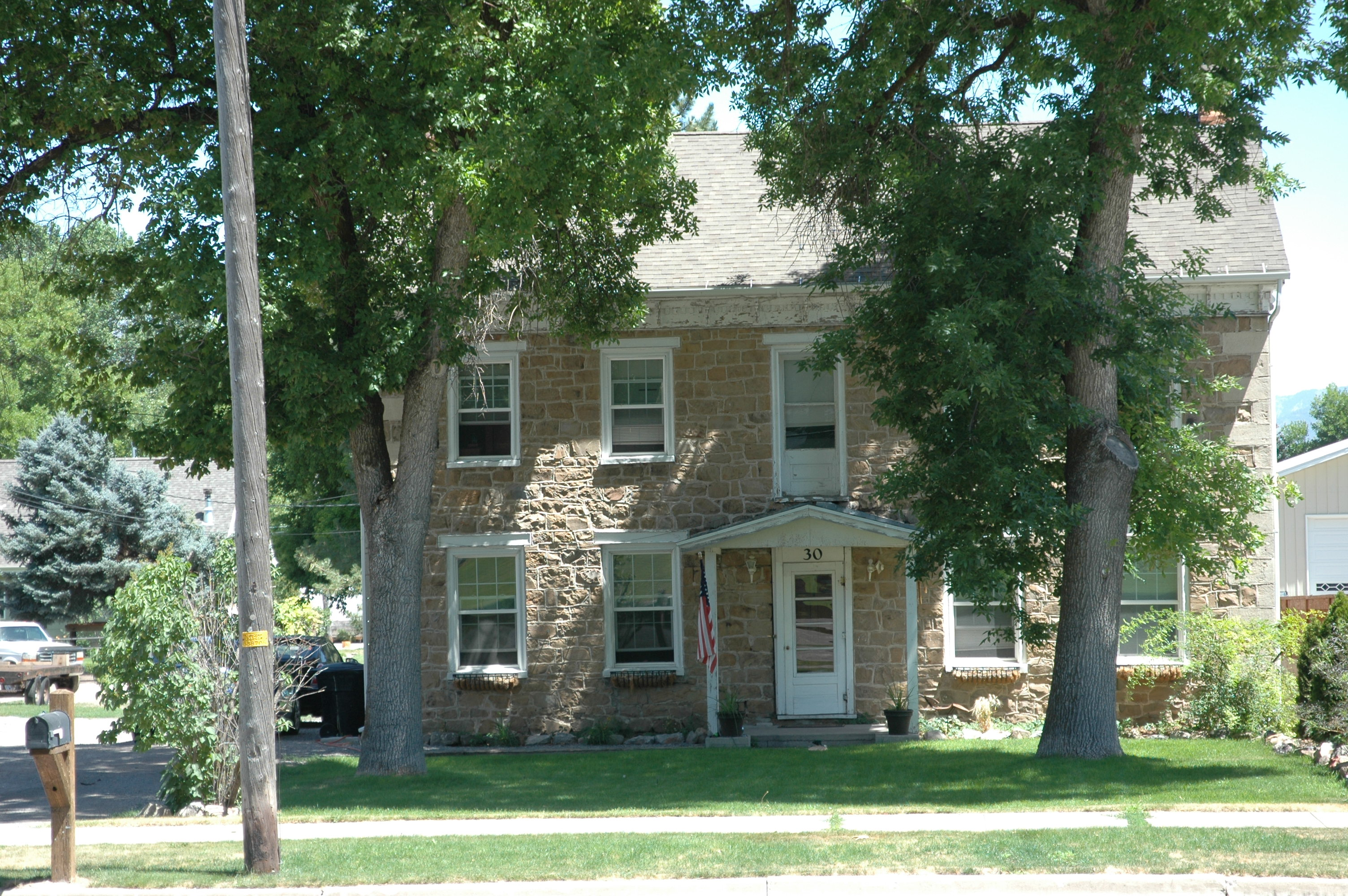
- The house in 2014

- Location within Utah Location within the United States
- Location: 30 South 100 East, Wellsville, Utah
- Coordinates: 41°38′16″N 111°55′49″W
- Area: 0.3 acres (0.12 ha)
- Built: 1869
- Architectural style: I-house
- NRHP reference No.: 79002490
- Added to NRHP: October 18, 1979

The Howell-Theurer House is a historic two-story house in Wellsville, Utah. It was built as an I-house in 1869. It was the boyhood home of Joseph Howell, who served as a member of the Utah Territorial Legislature from 1886 to 1892, the Utah Senate from 1896 to 1900, and the United States House of Representatives from 1903 to 1917. It has been listed on the National Register of Historic Places since October 18, 1979.
