= Samuel Crowthers Mitton House =

- U.S. National Register of Historic Places
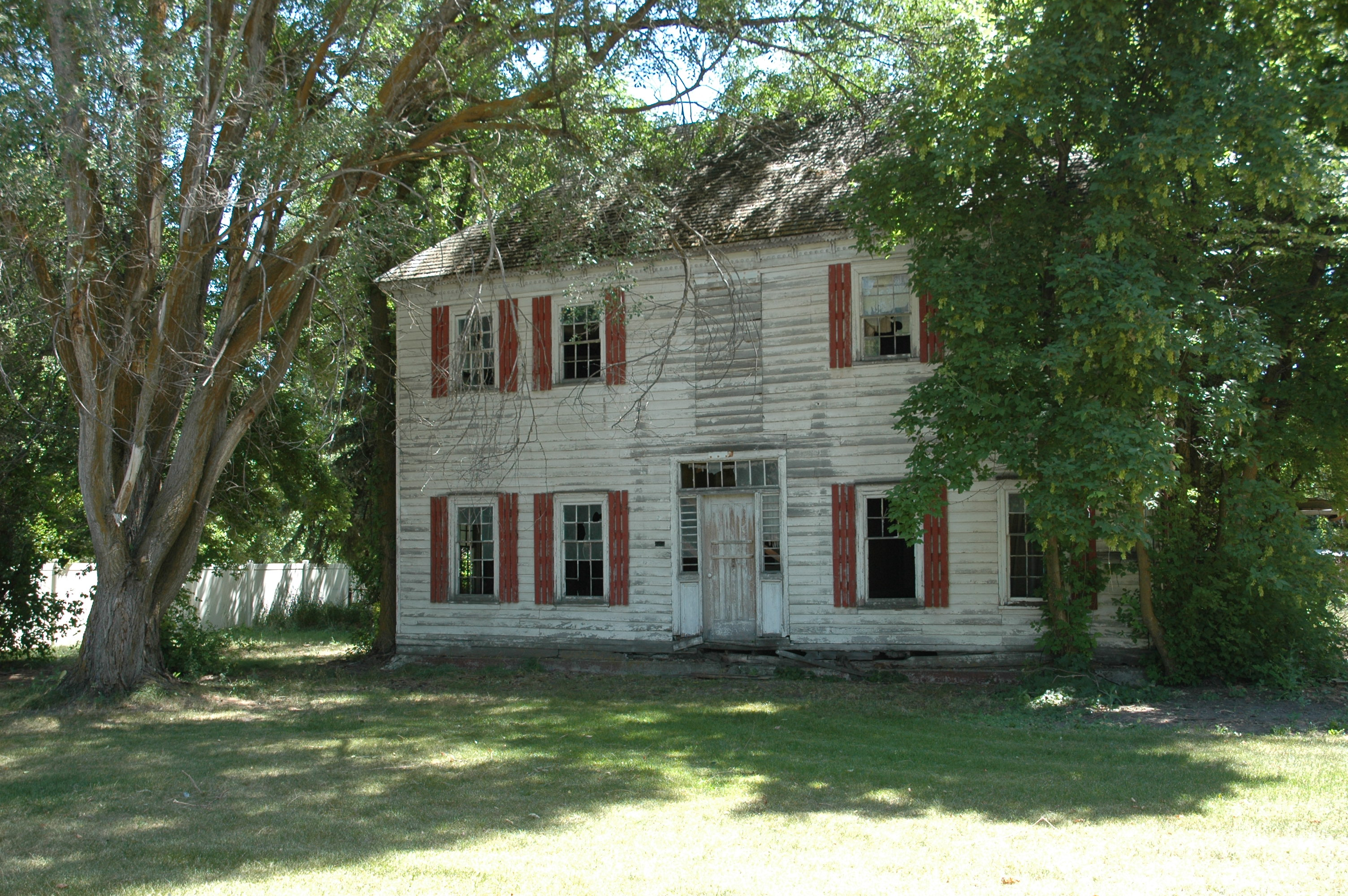
- The house in 2014

- Location within Utah Location within the United States
- Location: 242 East Main Street, Wellsville, Utah
- Coordinates: 41°38′18″N 111°55′36″W
- Area: less than one acre
- Built: 1865
- Built by: Samuel C. Mitton
- Architectural style: Central-Hall Double-Pile
- NRHP reference No.: 82004847
- Added to NRHP: November 19, 1982

The Samuel Crowthers Mitton House was a historic house in Wellsville, Utah. It was built in 1865, before Utah became a state, by Samuel Crowthers Mitton, a convert to the Church of Jesus Christ of Latter-day Saints who immigrated to the United States with his parents from Halifax, West Yorkshire, England. His family first settled in Illinois, and Mitton later lived in Farmington, Utah before moving to Wellsville, where he worked as a carpenter and cabinetmaker. The house has been listed on the National Register of Historic Places since November 19, 1982.
