= Erick Lehi and Ingrid Larsen Olson House =

- U.S. National Register of Historic Places
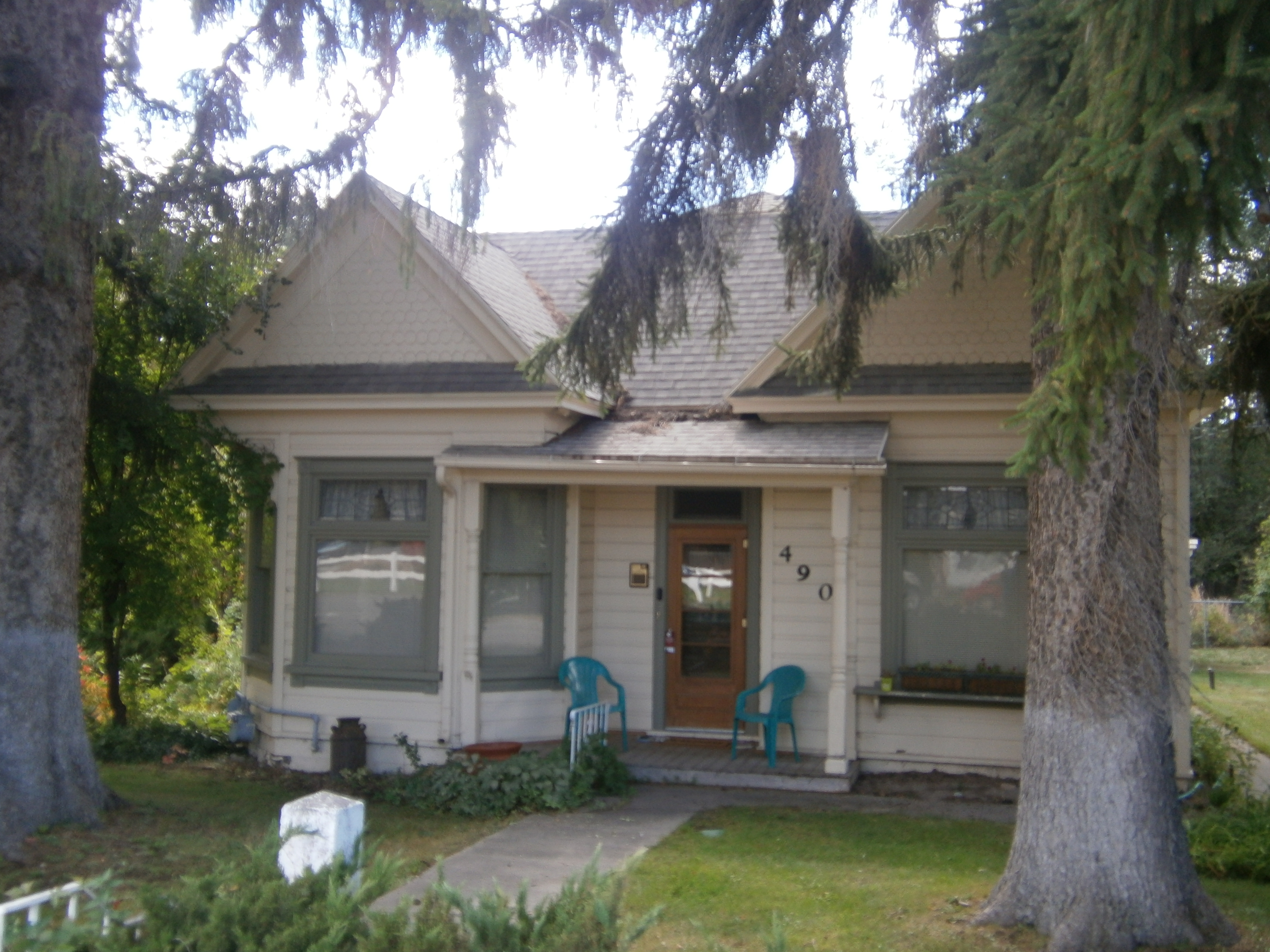
- The house in 2015

- Location within Utah Location within the United States
- Location: 490 East 600 South, River Heights, Utah
- Coordinates: 41°43′18″N 111°49′19″W
- Area: less than one acre
- Built: 1891
- Architectural style: Queen Anne
- NRHP reference No.: 97000225
- Added to NRHP: March 8, 1997

The Erick Lehi and Ingrid Larsen Olson House is a historic house in River Heights, Utah. It was built in 1891 for Erick Lehi Olson, an immigrant from Sweden who converted to the Church of Jesus Christ of Latter-day Saints at age 16 and arrived in America in 1882.

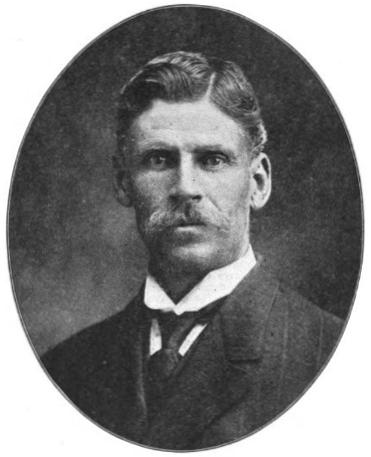
Erick Lehi Olson

His wife, née Ingrid Larsen, was also an immigrant from Sweden, where she converted to the LDS Church; she arrived in America in 1883. The Olsons lived in Logan before they moved to River Heights, where Olson served as the bishop and as the president of the Third Quorum of Elders of the Cache Stake. Their house was designed in the Queen Anne architectural style. It has been listed on the National Register of Historic Places since March 8, 1997.
