= River Heights Sinclair Station =

- U.S. National Register of Historic Places
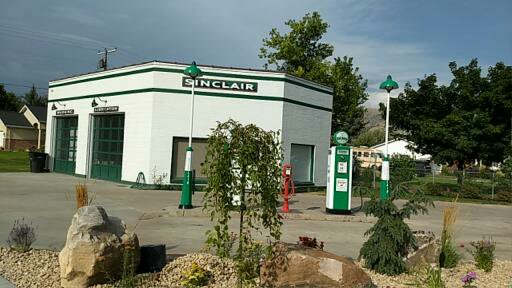
- Photo in 2017

- Location within Utah Location within the United States
- Location: 594 S. 400 East, River Heights, Utah
- Coordinates: 41°43′18″N 111°49′32″W
- NRHP reference No.: 100001077
- Added to NRHP: June 12, 2017

The River Heights Sinclair Station, at 594 S. 400 East in River Heights, Utah, was listed on the National Register of Historic Places in 2017.

It was renovated in the fall of 2016 and opened as a photography studio named Station Studio at the beginning of 2017.

== See also ==
- List of historic filling stations
