= George Bradshaw House and Joshua Salisbury/George Bradshaw Barn =

Historic house in Utah, United States

- U.S. National Register of Historic Places
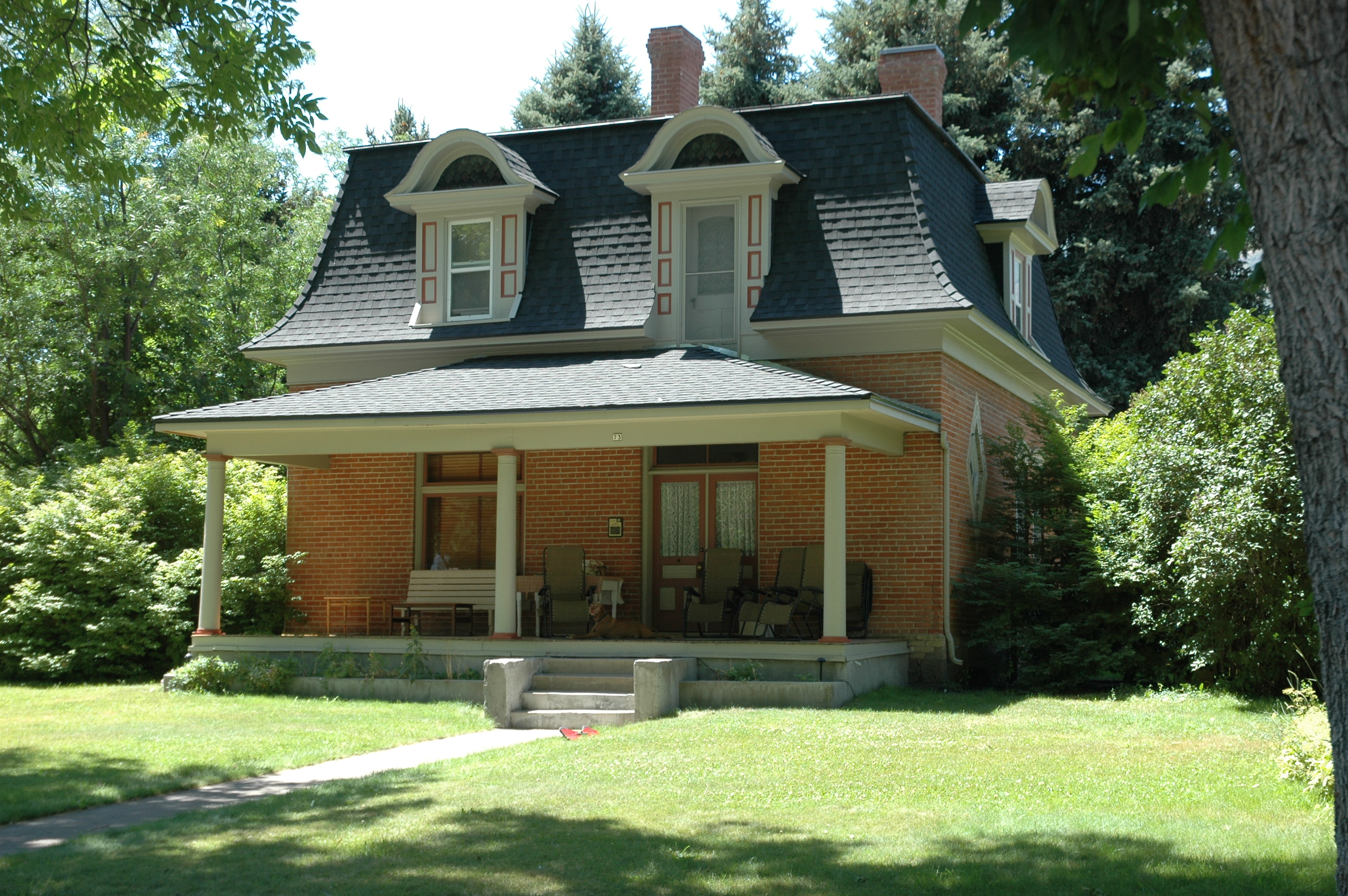
- The George Bradshaw House

- Location within Utah Location within the United States
- Location: 73 S. Center St., Wellsville, Utah
- Coordinates: 41°38′16″N 111°56′5″W
- Area: less than one acre
- Built: 1903; c.1875
- Built by: Joshua Salisbury
- Architectural style: Second Empire
- NRHP reference No.: 82004846
- Added to NRHP: November 19, 1982

The George Bradshaw House and Joshua Salisbury/George Bradshaw Barn in Wellsville, Utah, was listed on the National Register of Historic Places in 1982. The George Bradshaw House is significant as a rare example of Second Empire architecture in any rural area of Utah. The listing also includes a historic stone barn on the property, dating to approximately 1875.
