= John E. Lee House =

- U.S. National Register of Historic Places
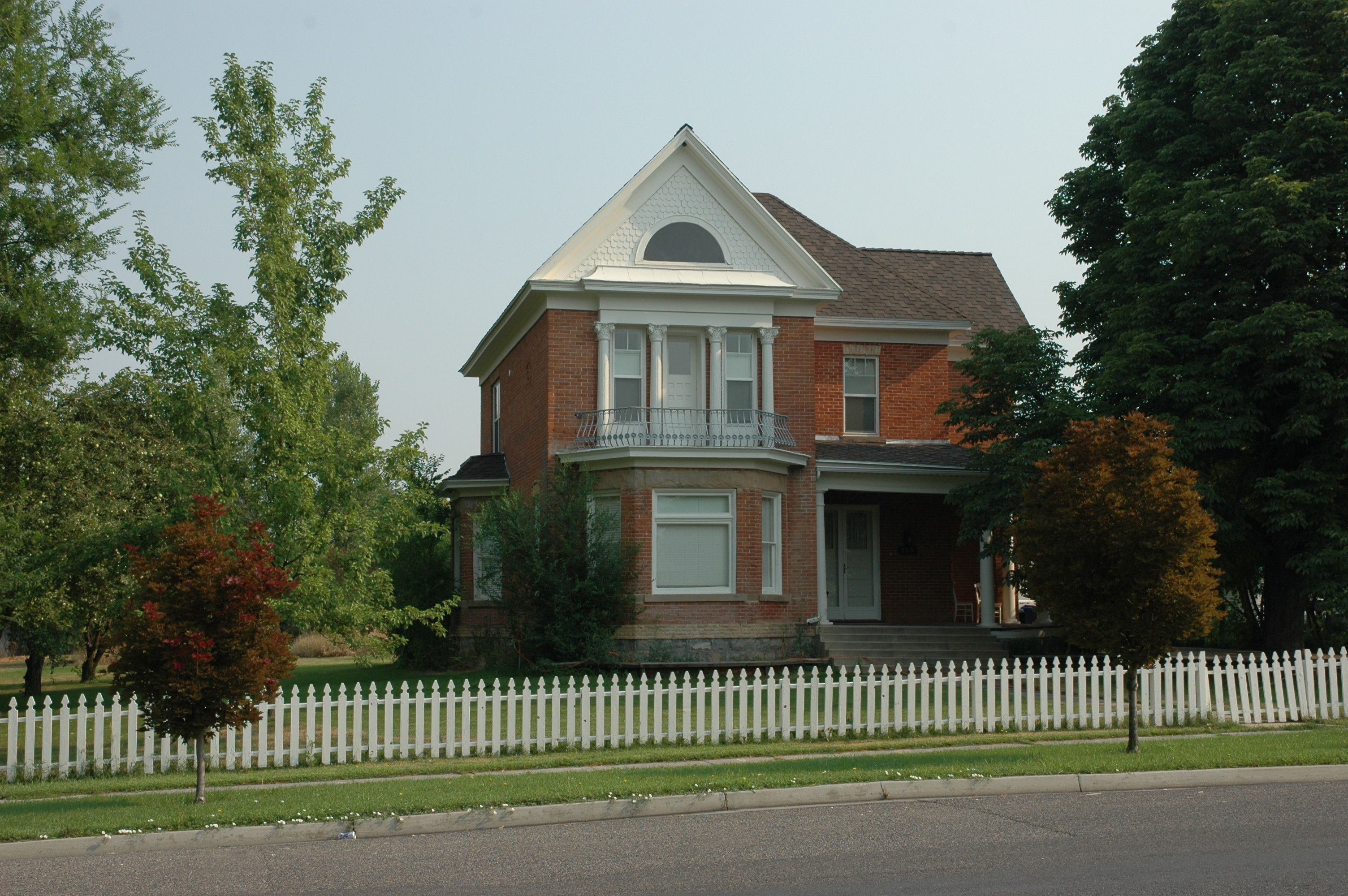
- The house in 2012

- Location within Utah Location within the United States
- Location: 123 West Center Street, Hyde Park, Utah
- Coordinates: 41°47′58″N 111°49′18″W
- Area: less than one acre
- Built: 1903
- Built by: Jesse Hancey
- Architect: Christian C. Lee
- Architectural style: Victorian Eclectic
- NRHP reference No.: 82004108
- Added to NRHP: February 11, 1982

The John E. Lee House is a historic two-story house in Hyde Park, Utah. It was built in 1903 by Jesse Hancey for John E. Lee, and designed in the Victorian Eclectic style by Lee's father, Christian C. Lee. Lee, who was a farmer and stockraiser, lived here with his wife, Hattie Reeder Lee, until his death in 1957. The Lees were members of the Church of Jesus Christ of Latter-day Saints. The house has been listed on the National Register of Historic Places since February 11, 1982.
