= Providence LDS Chapel and Meetinghouse =

- U.S. National Register of Historic Places
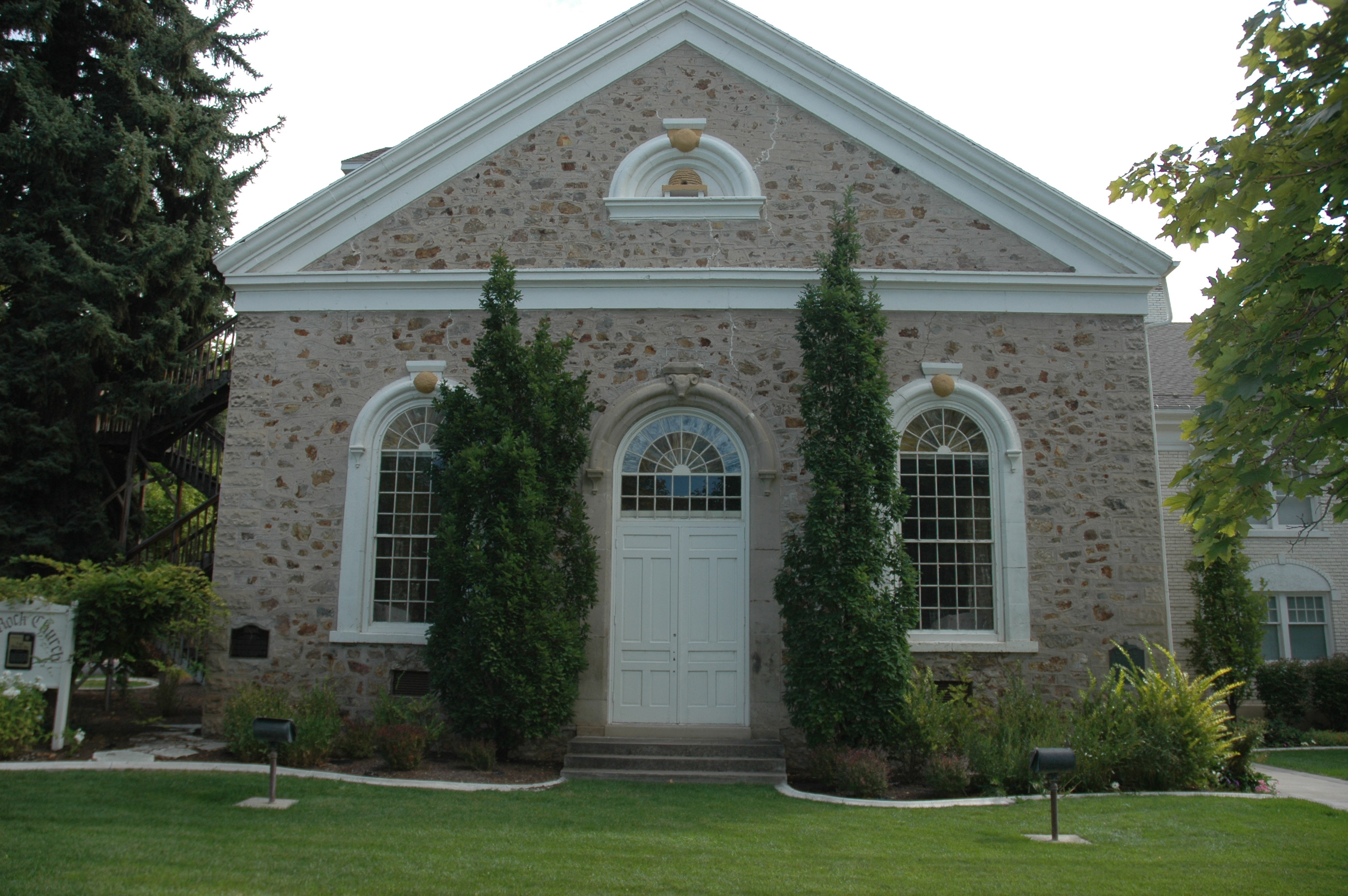
- The building in 2015

- Location within Utah Location within the United States
- Location: 20 South Main Street, Providence, Utah
- Coordinates: 41°42′28″N 111°49′00″W
- Area: 1.4 acres (0.57 ha)
- Built: 1869
- Built by: Henry Bullock, Henry Theurer, William Fife
- Architect: James H. Brown
- Architectural style: Greek Revival, Colonial Revival
- NRHP reference No.: 82004112
- Added to NRHP: February 11, 1982

The Providence LDS Chapel and Meetinghouse is a historic building in Providence, Utah. It was built in 1869–1873, before Utah became a state, as a chapel and meetinghouse for the Church of Jesus Christ of Latter-day Saints. It was designed in the Greek Revival style by James H. Brown. The roof was built by Henry Bullock, Henry Theurer, and William Fife. A two-story extension was built in 1925, and it was designed in the Colonial Revival style. The building remained the property of the LDS Church until 1967. It has been listed on the National Register of Historic Places since February 11, 1982.
