= James and Amy Burnham Farmstead =

- U.S. National Register of Historic Places
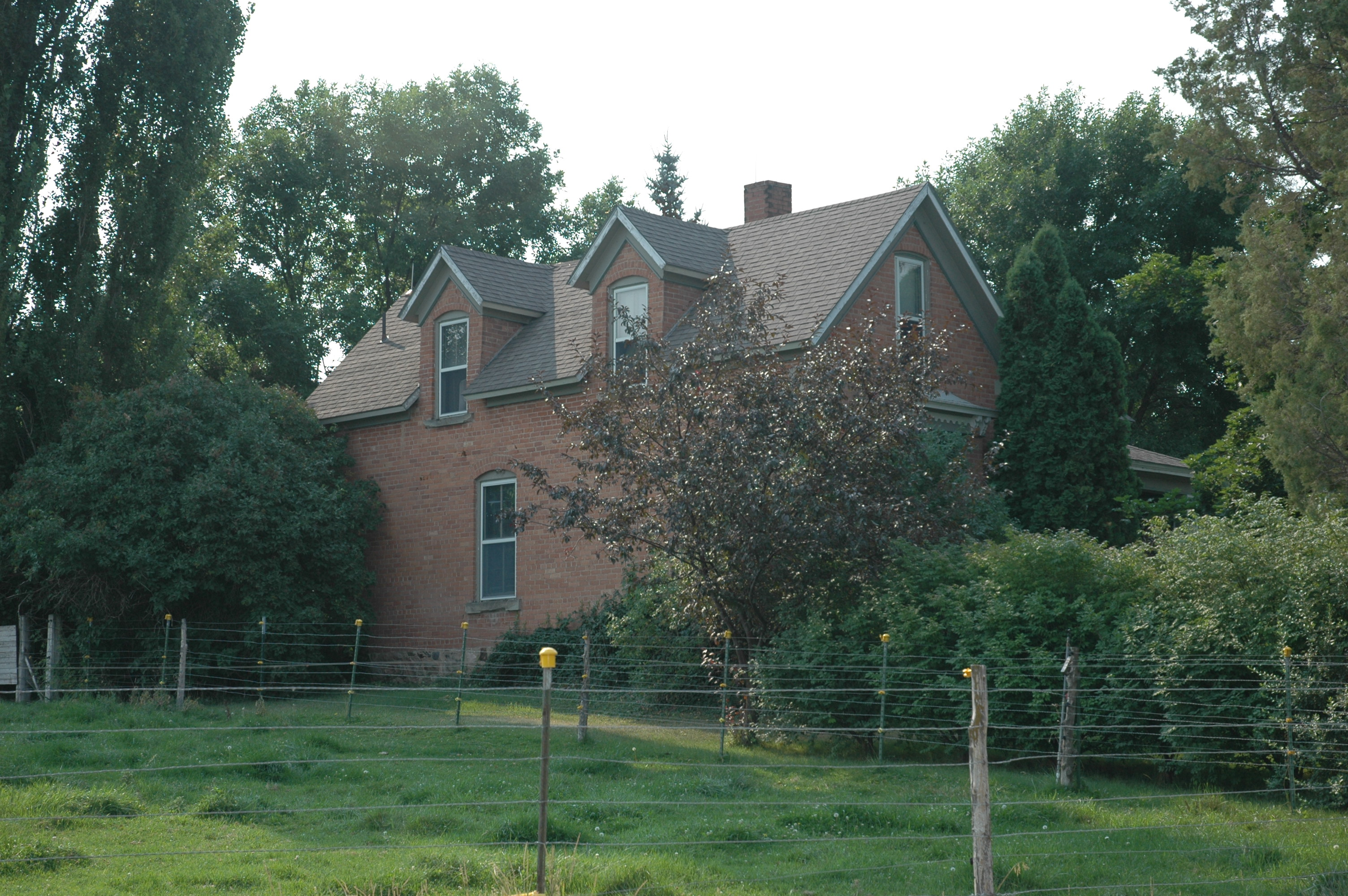
- The house in 2012

- Location within Utah Location within the United States
- Location: 533 South State Street, Richmond, Utah
- Coordinates: 41°54′46″N 111°48′27″W
- Area: 3.8 acres (1.5 ha)
- Built: 1895
- Architectural style: Victorian Eclectic
- MPS: Richmond, Utah MPS
- NRHP reference No.: 04001120
- Added to NRHP: October 8, 2004

The James and Amy Burnham Farmstead is a farm with a historic house in Richmond, Utah. It was built in 1895 for James Lewis Burnham and his wife, née Amy Blanche Penrose, who lived here with their twelve children. It was designed in the Victorian Eclectic style. It belonged to David Miller Ross from 1920 to 1928, when it was acquired by the Erickson family. It was purchased by Pete Schropp in 1986. It has been listed on the National Register of Historic Places since October 8, 2004.
