= Benson, Utah =

Census-designated place in Cache County, Utah

- Census-designated place
- Location in Cache County and the state of Utah
- Coordinates: 41°45′12″N 111°55′07″W
- Country: United States
- State: Utah
- County: Cache
- Organized: May 3, 1871
- Named for: Ezra T. Benson

Area
  - Total: 33.4 sq mi (86.5 km^{2})
  - Land: 30.4 sq mi (78.7 km^{2})
  - Water: 3.0 sq mi (7.8 km^{2})
- Elevation: 4,416 ft (1,346 m)

Population (2020)
  - Total: 1,492
  - Density: 49.1/sq mi (19.0/km^{2})
- Time zone: UTC-7 (Mountain (MST))
  - Summer (DST): UTC-6 (MDT)
- ZIP code: 84335
- Area code: 435
- FIPS code: 49-05050
- GNIS feature ID: 2407829

Benson is a census-designated place (CDP) in Cache County, Utah, United States. It is immediately south of Amalga, across Utah State Route 218, and is west of the Logan-Cache Airport. The population was 1,492 at the 2020 census. It is included in the Logan, Utah-Idaho Metropolitan Statistical Area.

As of February 2024, the Benson community was engaged in the process of becoming an incorporated municipality.

== Demographics ==
Historical population
Census	Pop.	Note	%±
2000	1,451		—
2010	1,485		2.3%
2020	1,492		0.5%

As of the census of 2000, there were 1,451 people, 415 households, and 351 families residing in the CDP. The population density was 46.9 inhabitants per square mile (18.1/km^{2}). There were 433 housing units at an average density of 14.0 per square mile (5.4/km^{2}). The racial makeup of the CDP was 95.11% White, 0.07% African American, 0.76% Native American, 0.14% Asian, 0.14% Pacific Islander, 2.96% from other races, and 0.83% from two or more races. Hispanic or Latino of any race were 4.07% of the population.

There were 415 households, out of which 49.2% had children under the age of 18 living with them, 78.1% were married couples living together, 4.1% had a female householder with no husband present, and 15.4% were non-families. 13.5% of all households were made up of individuals, and 7.5% had someone living alone who was 65 years of age or older. The average household size was 3.50 and the average family size was 3.89.

In the CDP, the population was spread out, with 37.6% under the age of 18, 11.3% from 18 to 24, 25.9% from 25 to 44, 16.4% from 45 to 64, and 8.8% who were 65 years of age or older. The median age was 26 years. For every 100 females, there were 108.5 males. For every 100 females age 18 and over, there were 105.0 males.

The median income for a household in the CDP was $41,369, and the median income for a family was $47,895. Males had a median income of $32,500 versus $19,028 for females. The per capita income for the CDP was $13,389. About 7.4% of families and 11.3% of the population were below the poverty line, including 14.2% of those under age 18 and 8.3% of those age 65 or over.

== Geography ==
According to the United States Census Bureau, the CDP has a total area of 33.4 square miles (86.5 km^{2}), of which 30.4 square miles (78.7 km^{2}) is land and 3.0 square miles (7.8 km^{2}), or 9.01%, is water. The water consists of the southern and eastern ends of Cutler Reservoir on the Little Bear and Bear rivers.

== Schools ==
Some of the earliest buildings built in Benson were for educational purposes. They were small log buildings of just one room, and later other rooms were added to some of them. These buildings were only temporary structures where the basic three "R's" were taught, and were later replaced by more permanent structures.

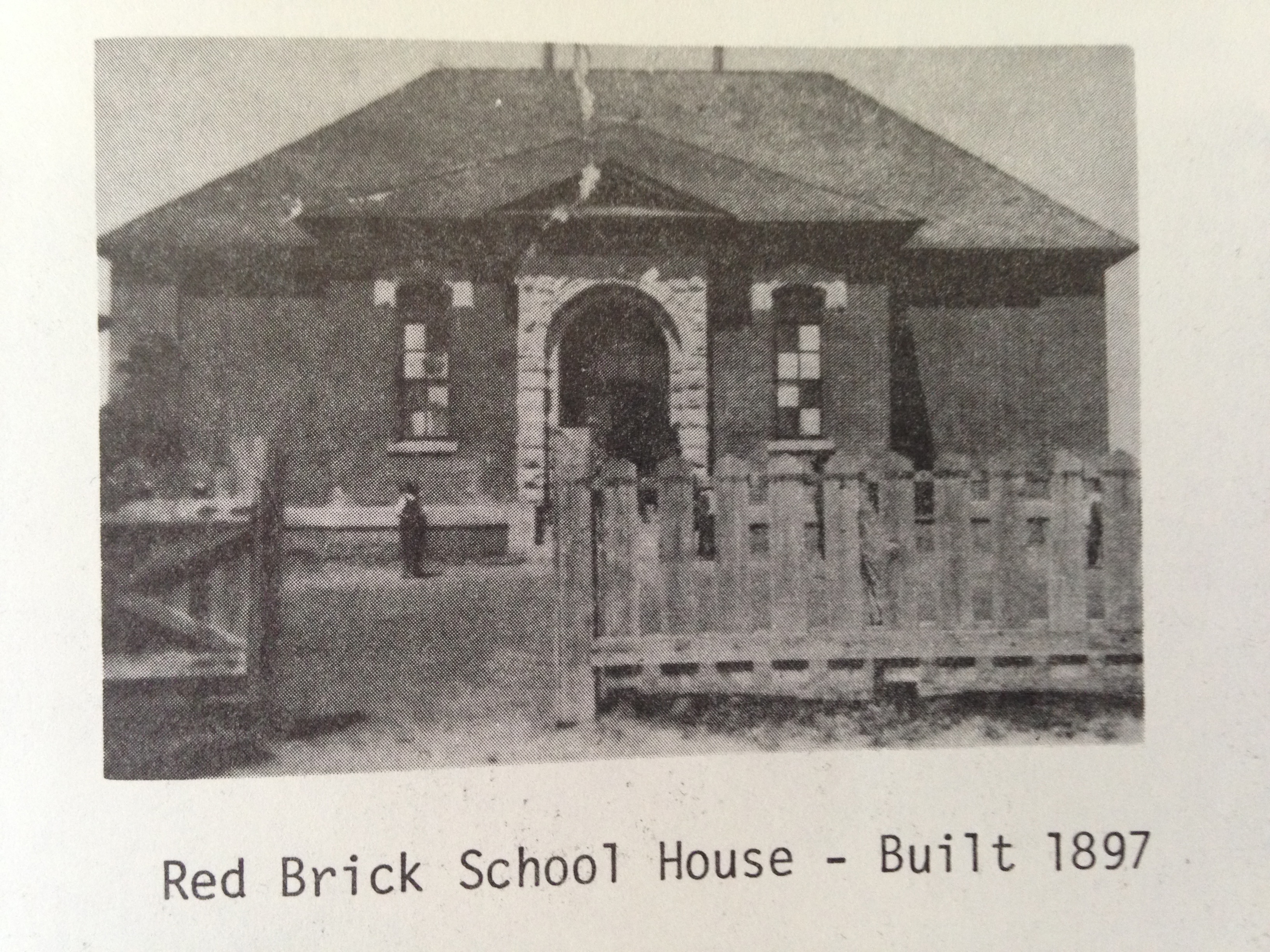
Red Brick School House

In 1894 a brick school house was built in the east part of Benson called the Riverside School. It had two classrooms, with three grades taught in each room. At the Riverside School, the teacher, Mary Griffith, was paid $30 a month in 1896. In 1901 a janitor was hired for nine weeks for $4.50. One ton of coal cost $4.25. John Mathews bought the log building that was on the Riverside location and spent many hours directing cantatas.

In 1897 a new brick school house was built in the west part of Benson. This school was built on a spot of land overlooking the Bear River. At first there were eight grades of school taught in two rooms. Later, as more children were enrolled, there were only grades one through six. The Benson Elementary School is listed on the National Register of Historic Places.

After the construction of these school buildings, church was held in them for a time. These two schools served the educational needs of the first six grades until 1935 when a new modern school was built. This school was used for three decades. In 1968 it closed its doors, and the Cache County School Board felt it best to consolidate some of the smaller schools in the county to provide a wider curriculum while saving money at the same time. In the fall of 1969, all school-age children were transported by bus to other schools. Kindergarten to sixth grade went to Summit Elementary in Smithfield. Seventh to ninth grade went to Richmond North Cache Junior High and tenth through twelfth grades to Sky View High School in Smithfield.

== See also ==
- List of census-designated places in Utah
