= Heber K. and Rachel H. Bankhead House =

Historic place in Utah, US

- U.S. National Register of Historic Places
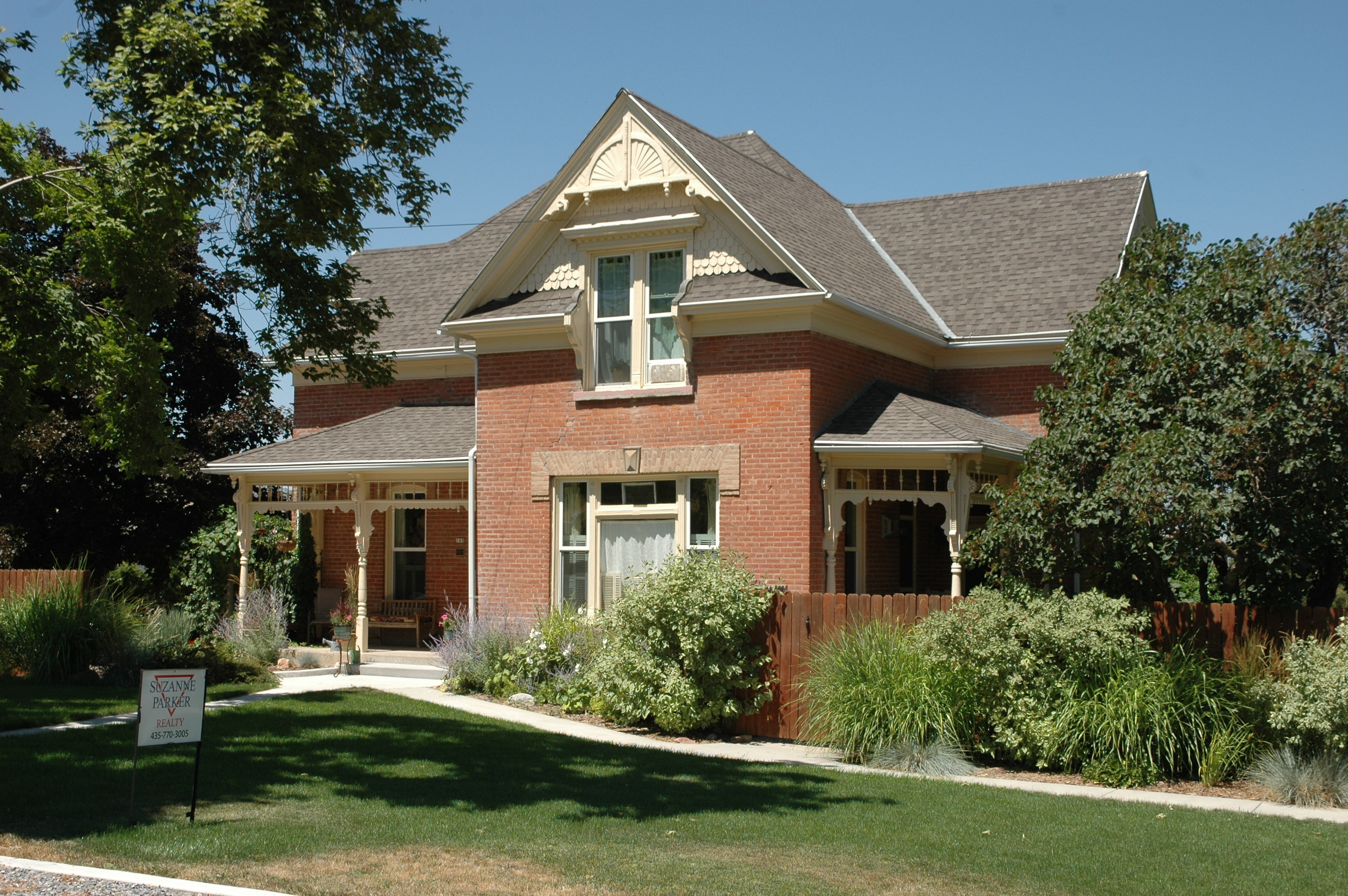

- Location within Utah Location within the United States
- Location: 185 E. 800 South, Wellsville, Utah
- Coordinates: 41°37′20″N 111°55′49″W
- Area: less than one acre
- Built: 1897
- Architectural style: Late Victorian
- NRHP reference No.: 97000261
- Added to NRHP: March 21, 1997

The Heber K. and Rachel H. Bankhead House, at 185 E 800 South in Wellsville, Utah, was built in 1897. It was listed on the National Register of Historic Places in 1997.

It is Late Victorian in style. It is a one-and-one-half-story, red brick, house with a central block and projecting bays, built upon a concrete-covered stone foundation.
