= Morgan A. and Clarissa R. Knapp House =

- U.S. National Register of Historic Places
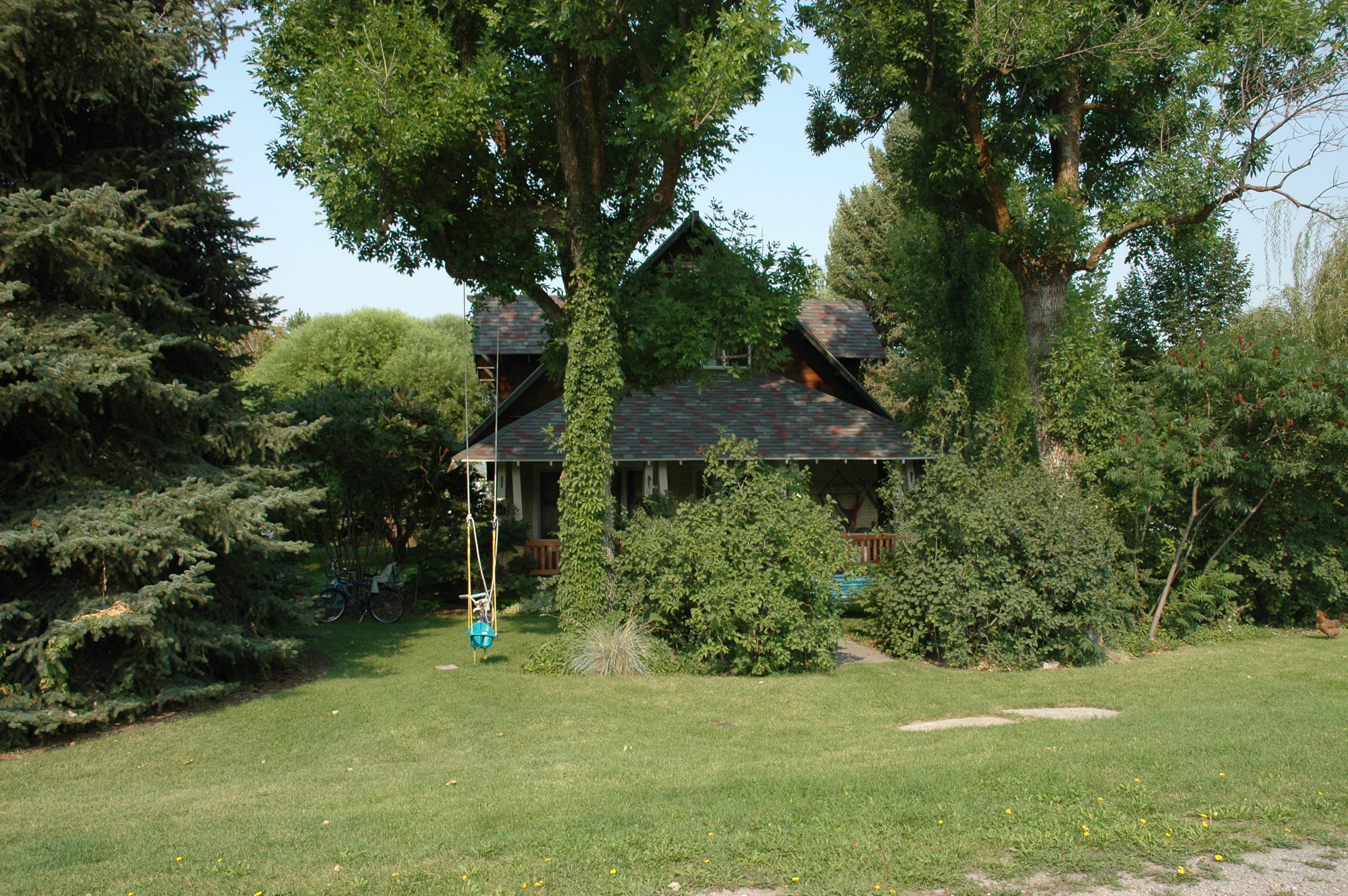

- Location within Utah
- Location: 106 South 100 East, Richmond, Utah
- Coordinates: 41°55′13″N 111°48′19″W
- Area: 0.4 acres (0.16 ha)
- Built by: Knapp, Morgan A.
- Architectural style: Bungalow/craftsman
- MPS: Richmond, Utah MPS
- NRHP reference No.: 04001126
- Added to NRHP: October 8, 2004

The Morgan A. and Clarissa R. Knapp House, at 106 South 100 East in Richmond, Utah, was listed on the National Register of Historic Places in 2004.

It is a one-and-a-half-story Craftsman-style bungalow built in 1913–14. It has a full-width porch. Its yellow brick walls are laid in running bond. It has "rare colored and leaded-glass Arts & Crafts-style windows", the larger ones featuring upper sashes with Queen Anne-style colored lights.
