= Hendricks Confectionery Building =

- U.S. National Register of Historic Places
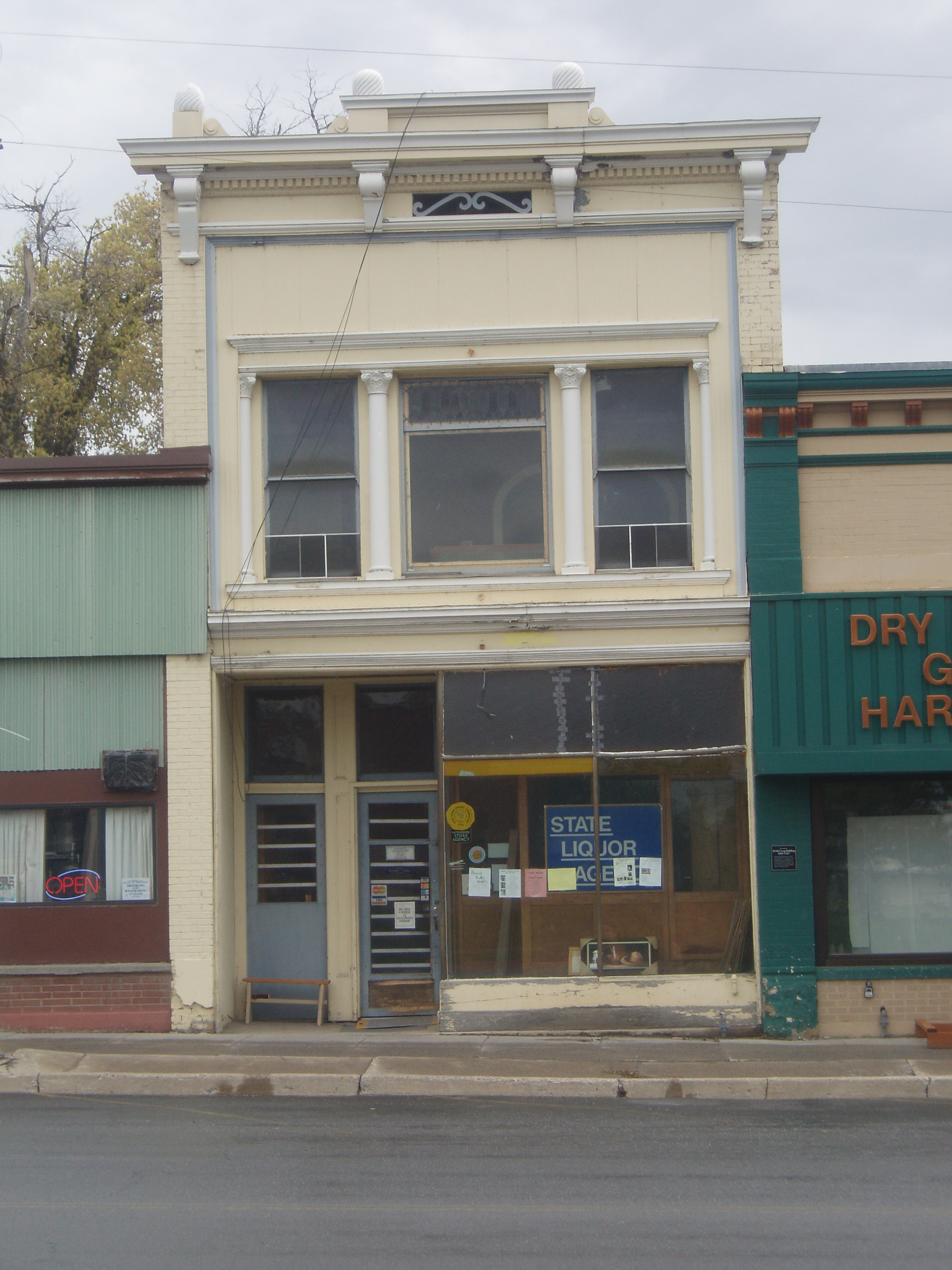

- Location within Utah
- Location: 19 W. Main St., Richmond, Utah
- Coordinates: 41°55′21″N 111°48′31″W
- Area: 0.1 acres (0.040 ha)
- Built: c.1909
- Architectural style: Late Victorian, Classical Revival
- MPS: Richmond, Utah MPS
- NRHP reference No.: 04001122
- Added to NRHP: October 8, 2004

The Hendricks Confectionery Building at 19 W. Main St. in Richmond, Utah, was built around 1909. It was listed on the National Register of Historic Places in 2004.

It is a two-part commercial block building with Late Victorian and Classical Revival ornamentation. It served as a confectionery for about 30 years then became a pharmacy, Richmond Drugs.
