= Benson Elementary School =

Historic school building in Benson, Utah

- Formerly listed on the U.S. National Register of Historic Places
- Location: 3440 N. 3000 West, Benson, Utah
- Coordinates: 41°47′45″N 111°54′17″W
- Area: 1.2 acres (0.49 ha)
- Built: 1935
- Architectural style: PWA Moderne
- MPS: Public Works Buildings TR
- NRHP reference No.: 85000798

Significant dates
- Added to NRHP: April 1, 1985
- Removed from NRHP: December 29, 2025

The Benson Elementary School, at 3440 N. 3000 West in Benson, Utah, was built in 1935. It was listed on the National Register of Historic Places in 1985.

It was a PWA Moderne-style elementary school, built of locally manufactured yellow bricks. One wing had a parapeted gable roof.

Originally built as a local elementary school, in 1969 the building began to be used for the Cache Instructional Workshop, a vocational school for people with disabilities. Years later the program was moved, and the building was demolished sometime between 1993 and 2002.
