= Douglas General Mercantile =

Building in Smithfield, Utah, United States

- U.S. National Register of Historic Places
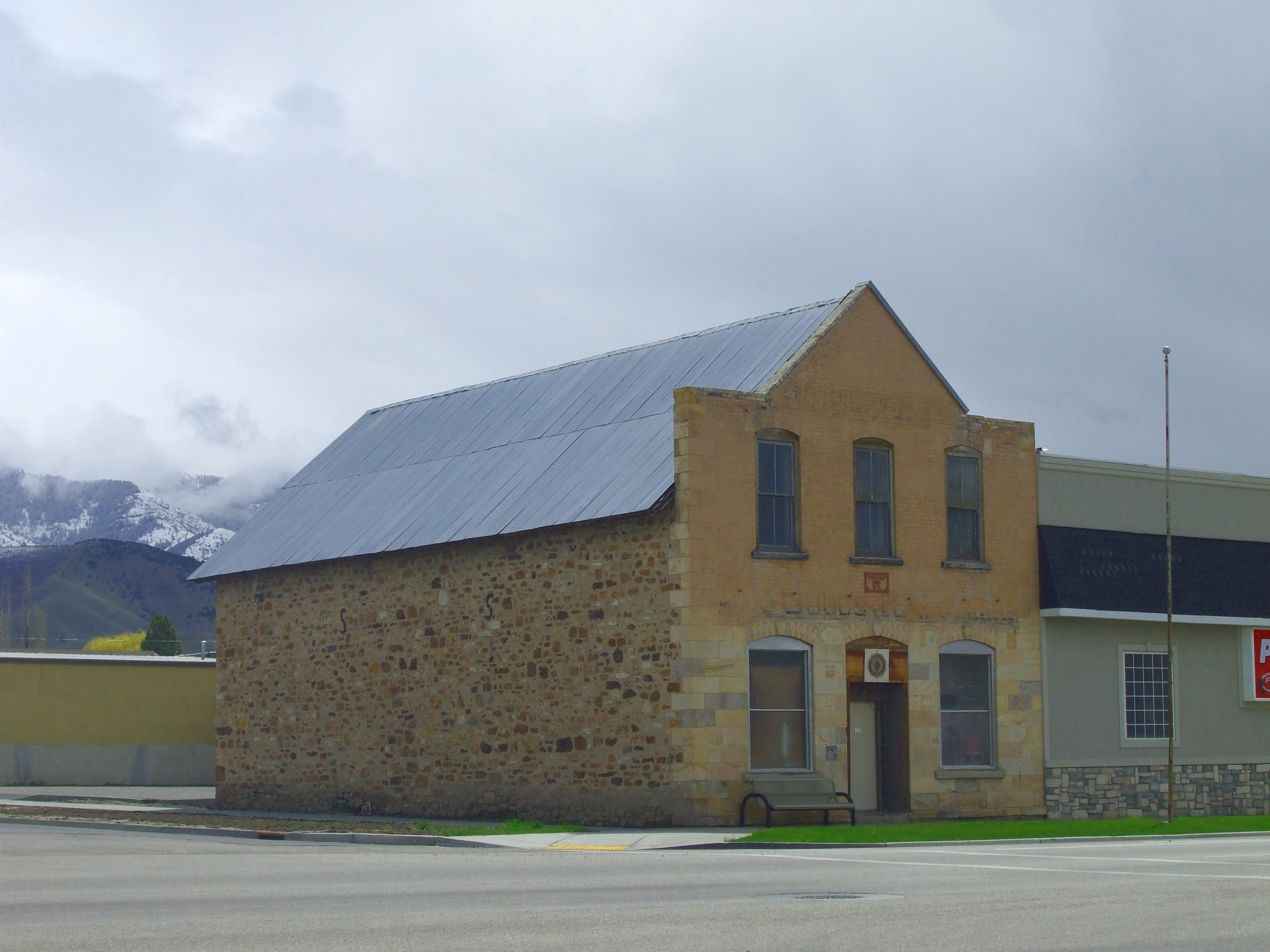

- Location within Utah Location within the United States
- Location: 100 Main St., Smithfield, Utah
- Coordinates: 41°50′03″N 111°49′54″W
- Area: less than one acre
- Built: 1883
- NRHP reference No.: 82004113
- Added to NRHP: August 4, 1982

The Douglas General Mercantile, at 100 Main St. in Smithfield, Utah, was built in 1883 and was listed on the National Register of Historic Places in 1982.

It is a two-story building constructed of rubble stone, brick, coursed sandstone, and wood. It is 35 by 65 feet (11 m × 20 m) in plan.

Its National Register nomination describes its importance:

Built in 1883, the Douglas General Mercantile Store is locally significant as the oldest remaining commercial building in the town of Smithfield, Cache County, Utah. The town was founded in October 1859 as part of Cache Valley, which was itself settled in 1856 during the first stage of the Mormon colonization of Utah. William Douglas, who operated the store, began business in Smithfield in 1865, obtaining goods from the East and wholesaling them throughout the area. In 1883, when the building was constructed, it was one of only three such establishments in the town, and remains as the only physical structure tied to Smithfield's early commercial history. The building has been associated with the commercial activity in the town through the firms of Douglas Mercantile, James Cantwell & Son, and the Union Merc Company since 1883. In addition, the building is the second oldest mercantile building identified to date that is located outside Utah's heavily populated area known as the Wasatch Front, which comprises four of Utah's twenty-nine counties. The oldest building is the Ephraim United Order Cooperative Building constructed in 1871 [...]. Also, the building gains added importance in the history of Smithfield because of its unique construction, the only one of its type in the town. Stone was used for the rear and two side walls in a rubble construction technique, while brick was utilized on the upper half of the facade and coursed sandstone for the lower half. Thus, the building represents the use of four different building materials as wood was also utilized.

In 1980 it was owned by the American Legion Dept. of Utah, and had signage for being the Earl S. Harper Post 58 of the American Legion.
