= Hobson-Hill House =

- U.S. National Register of Historic Places
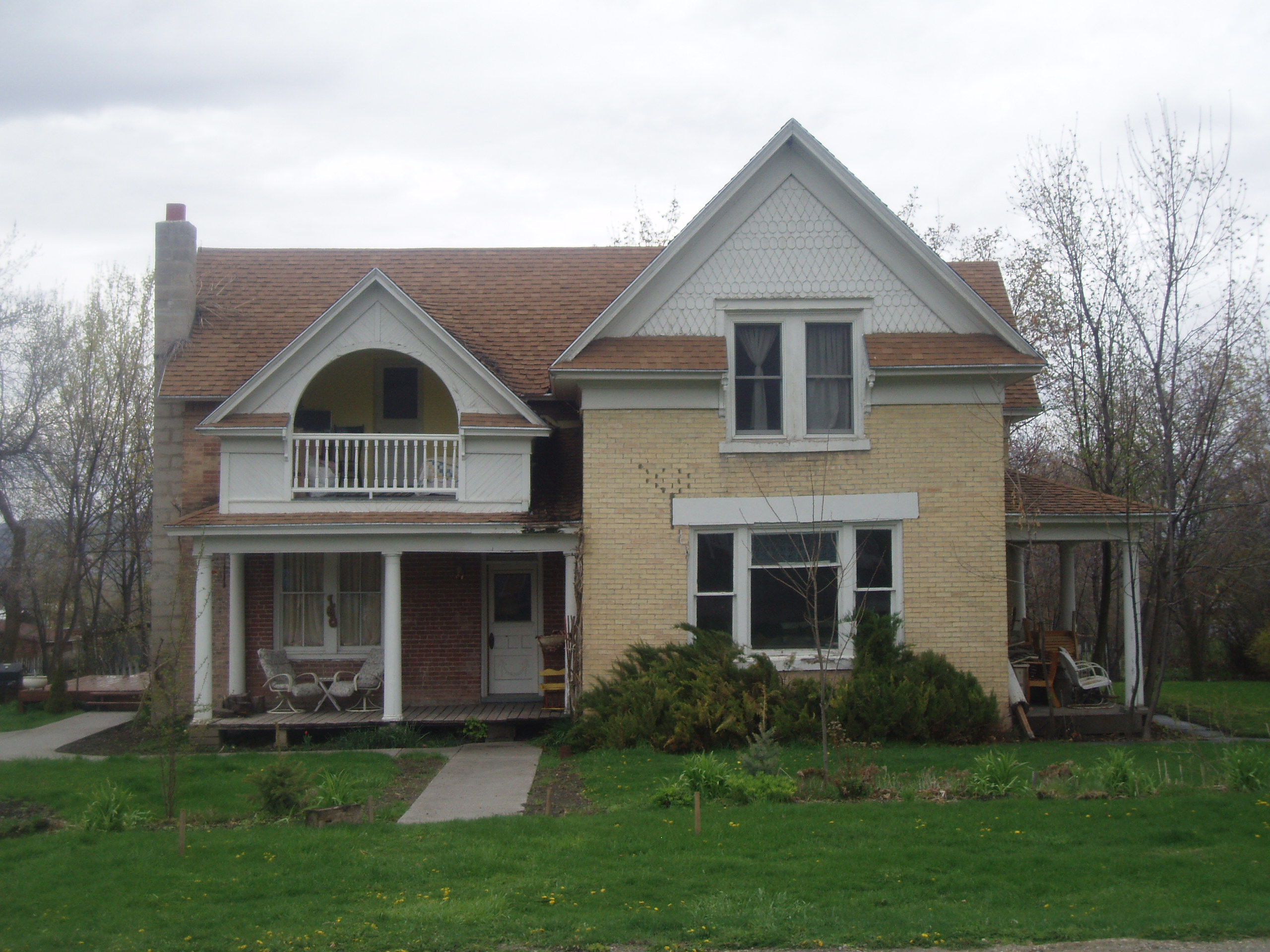

- Location within Utah Location within the United States
- Location: 108 South 100 West, Richmond, Utah
- Coordinates: 41°55′13″N 111°48′40″W
- Area: 1.9 acres (0.77 ha)
- Built: c.1883, c.1900, c.1905
- Architectural style: Late Victorian
- MPS: Richmond, Utah MPS
- NRHP reference No.: 04001125
- Added to NRHP: October 8, 2004

The Hobson-Hill House, at 108 South 100 West in Richmond, Utah, was listed on the National Register of Historic Places in 2004. It has also been known as the Louis & Clara Merrill House and as the George & Maud Bair House. The listing included three contributing buildings.

It is a brick cross wing house with Victorian Eclectic stylings, built upon a rubble foundation. Its oldest portion was built around 1883: a one-and-a-half-story red brick house with a lean-to extension. A frame ell to the west was added around 1900. It became a cross-wing plan house with a c.1905 yellow brick addition to the north.
