= Clarkston Tithing Granary =

Historic building in Utah, United States

- U.S. National Register of Historic Places
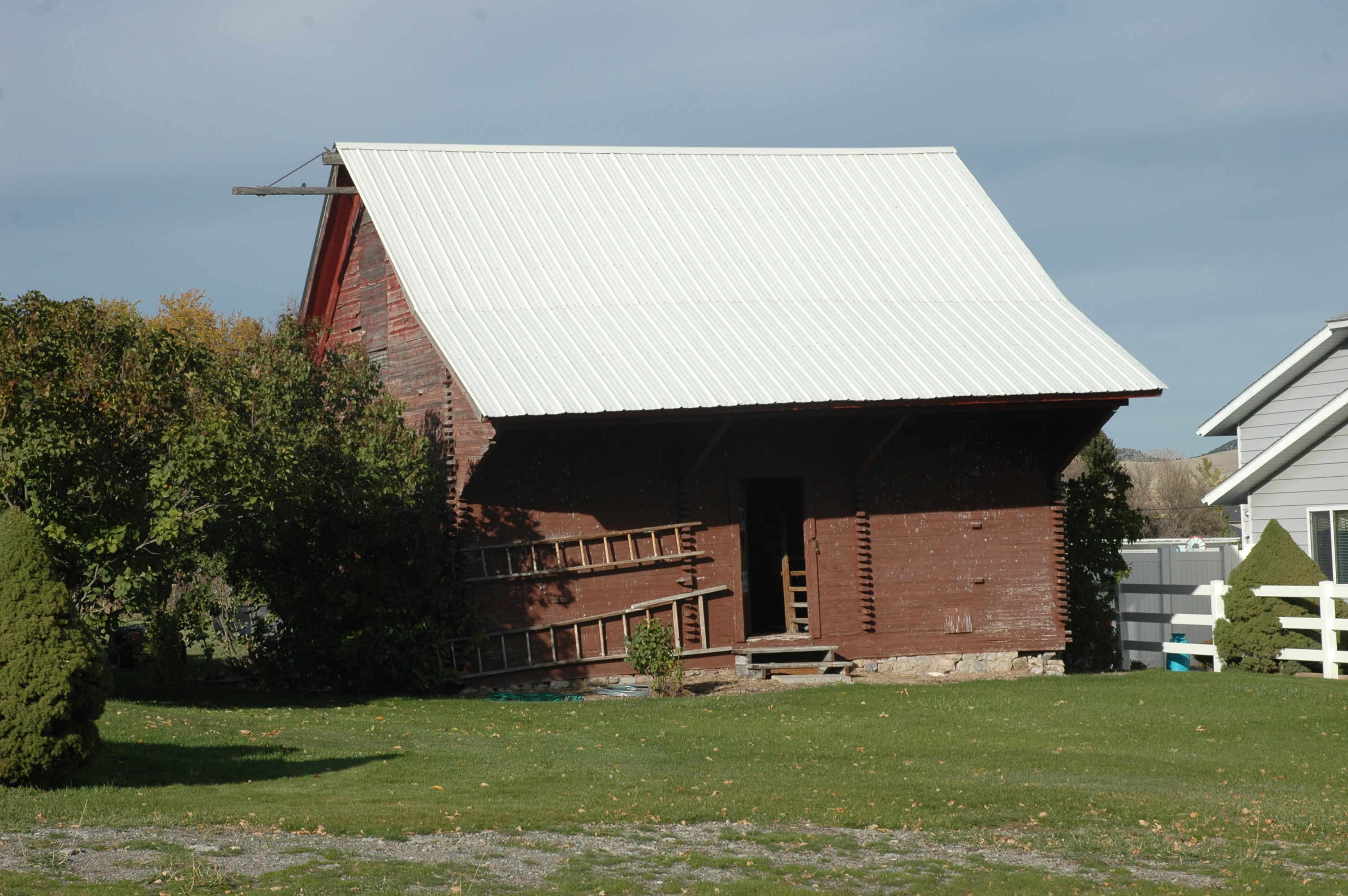
- Granary at original location in October 2016

- Location within Utah Location within the United States
- Location: 10212 N. 8700 West, Clarkston, Utah
- Area: less than one acre
- Built: 1905
- MPS: Tithing Offices and Granaries of the Mormon Church TR
- NRHP reference No.: 85000250
- Added to NRHP: January 25, 1985

The Clarkston Tithing Granary, at 10212 N. 8700 West in Clarkston, Utah, was built in 1905 to house in kind tithing donations by the Church of Jesus Christ of Latter-day Saints. It was listed on the National Register of Historic Places in 1985.

The building was moved a few blocks in 2018 from its original location on E 100 S (41°55′05.5″N 112°02′50″W, behind house at northeast corner of E 100 S and S 100 E) to new location at 88 W. Center St. (41°55′11.75″N 112°03′11″W, southeast corner of W. Center St. and S 100 W). (Note: Its NRHP listing address was 10212 N. 8700 West on a county-level street-naming system; local streets have since been renamed to radiate out from Center and Main St. in Clarkston, and that street is now E 100 S. The new location at 88 W. Center is at the intersection of Center St. and S 100 W (formerly S 8900 W). As of October 2019, Google satellite view of original location shows a bare spot while Google streetview dated July 2013 shows the granary still there, mostly behind some shrubberies; Bing aerial view also shows the granary still there. In October 2019, Google satellite shows the granary at its new location, while July 2013–dated Google Streetview and Bing aerial view shows that as a lot with trees but vacant of any building. Both locations can be seen in linked "Map of all coordinates" at the right.)

The building was moved on September 8, 2018.

It is a one-story frame building with a gable roof, and with a shed roof porch.
