= Wellsville Tabernacle =

Historic church in Utah, United States

- U.S. National Register of Historic Places
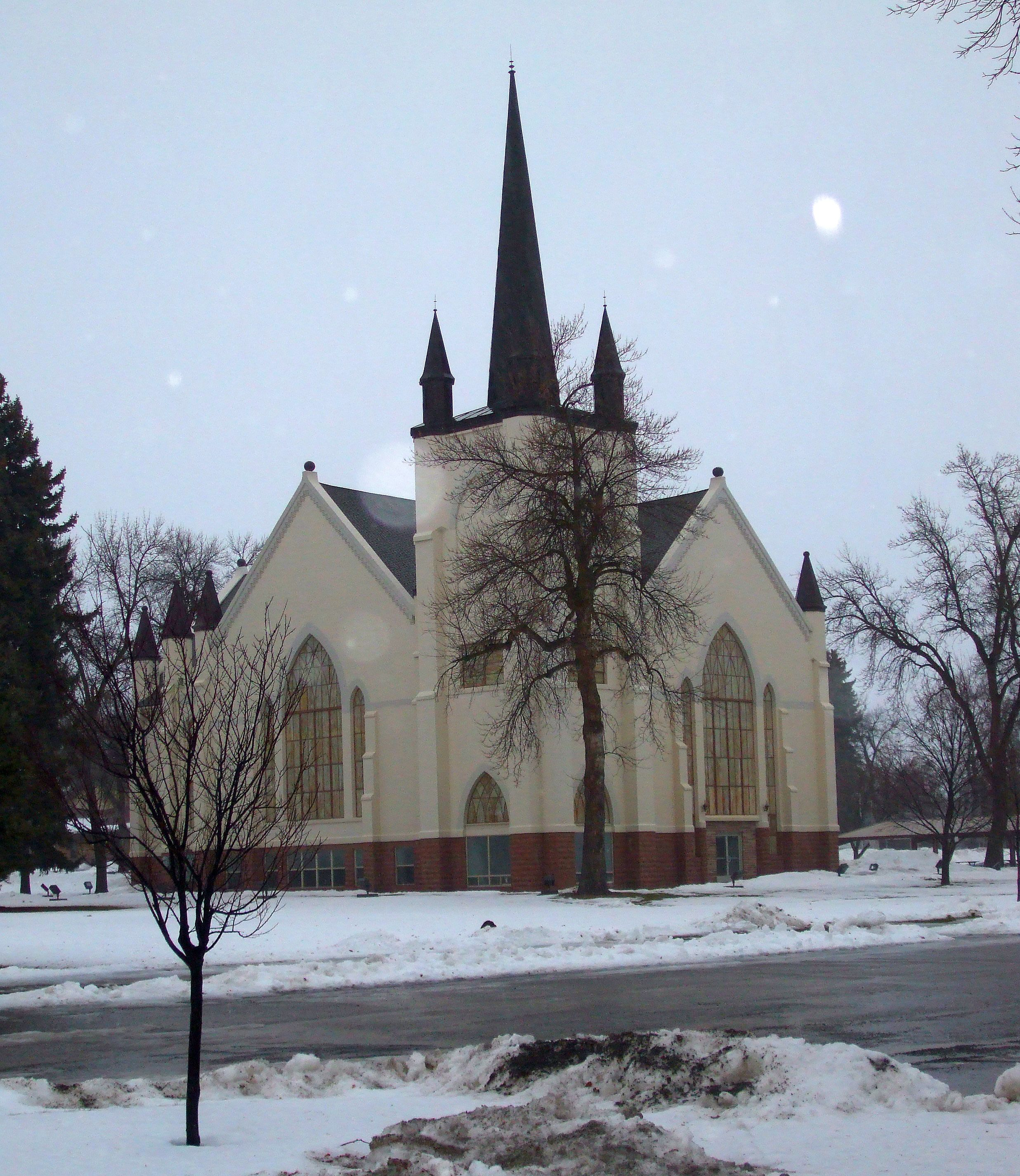
- The Wellsville Tabernacle in 2009

- Location within Utah Location within the United States
- Location: 75 S. 100 E., Wellsville, Utah
- Coordinates: 41°38′15″N 111°55′55″W
- Built: 1902-1908
- Architect: C.T. Barrett
- Architectural style: Victorian Eclectic
- NRHP reference No.: 80003893
- Added to NRHP: November 26, 1980

The Wellsville Tabernacle was built as a Gothic Revival-styled meetinghouse of the Church of Jesus Christ of Latter-day Saints (LDS Church) and is located in Wellsville, Cache County, Utah. It was listed on the National Register of Historic Places on November 26, 1980.

== Construction ==
Ground was broken in 1902 by William H. Maughan, who had served as bishop in Wellsville, Utah for forty years. The cornerstones were laid by LDS Apostle Abraham O. Woodruff and Seymour B. Young in 1903. The tabernacle was built using stone quarried from nearby Sardine Canyon and red brick. The tabernacle was dedicated June 28, 1908 by Anthon H. Lund of the LDS Church's First Presidency. The Tabernacle seats approximately 800. The cost of building the tabernacle was $65,000. With the pulpit in the northwest corner and a diagonal aisle with semi-circular pews facing the pulpit, the tabernacle has a unique floor plan for LDS meetinghouses, which typically have centered pulpits.

== Modifications ==
The main tower was destroyed by fire in 1959 and the replacement was much shorter. The original red bricks were painted white in the 1950s.

== Current use and ownership ==
The tabernacle was sold to the city of Wellsville in 1981. The city was unable to adequately maintain the building and it was sold to the Wellsville Tabernacle Foundation, a group of concerned private citizens who have made the building available to rent for private and community events including weddings. Part of the tabernacle served as a museum of the Daughters of the Utah Pioneers. Facing structural deficiencies in the roof, the tabernacle was closed in 2010 and the Wellsville Tabernacle Foundation is currently hoping to raise $150,000 in funds necessary for renovation in order to reopen.
