= Plant Auto Company Building =

- Formerly listed on the U.S. National Register of Historic Places
- Location within Utah Location within the United States
- Location: 38 South 200 West (UT 91), Richmond, Utah
- Coordinates: 41°55′20″N 111°48′51″W
- Area: less than one acre
- Built: 1916
- Architectural style: Late Victorian
- MPS: Richmond, Utah MPS
- NRHP reference No.: 04001129

Significant dates
- Added to NRHP: October 8, 2004
- Removed from NRHP: March 26, 2018

The Plant Auto Company Building was a building at 38 South 200 West (State Route 91) in Richmond, Utah which was built in 1916. It was listed on the National Register of Historic Places in 2004, but was later demolished, and it has been delisted from the National Register.

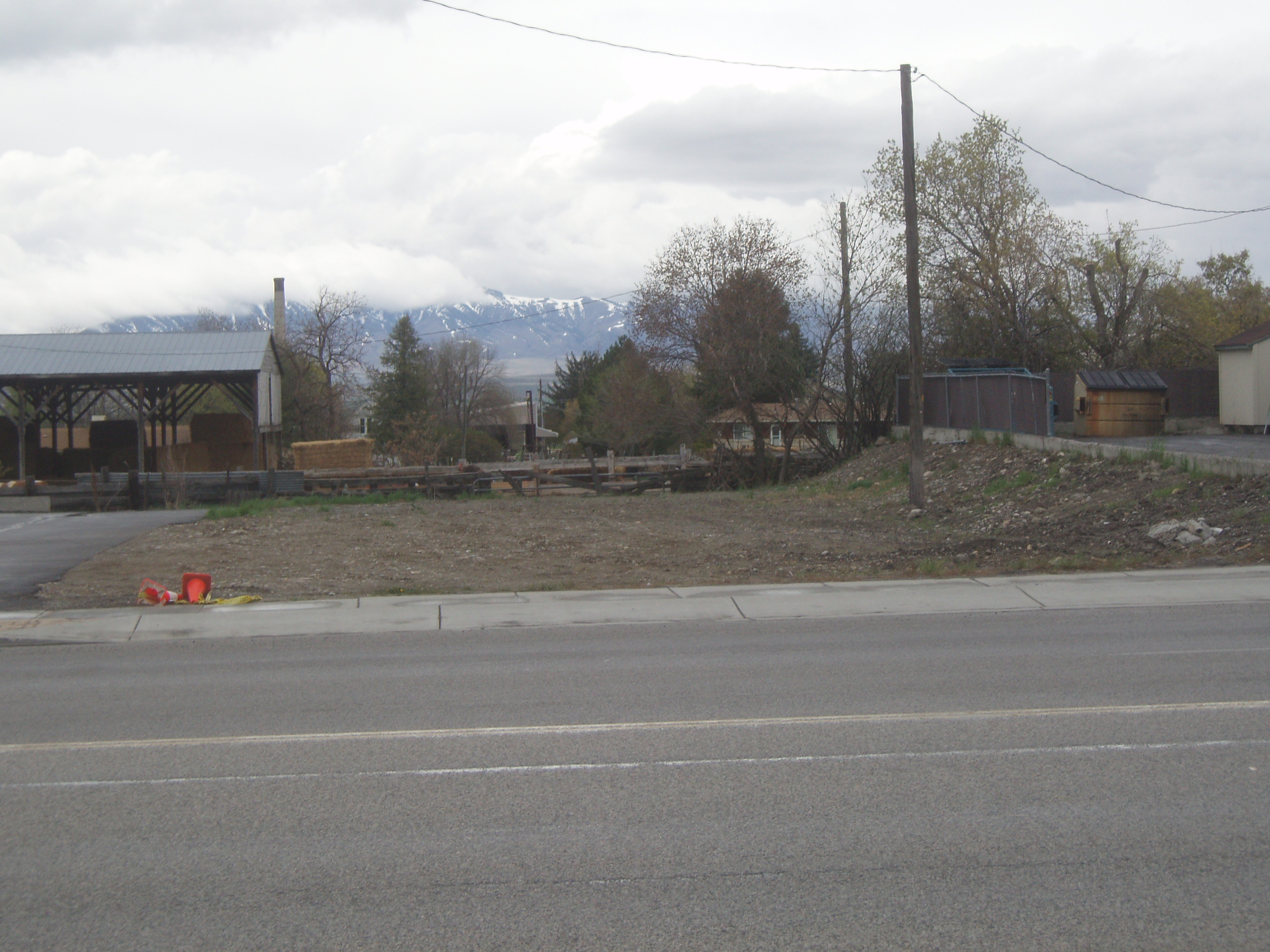
Site of former building

This one-part Victorian Eclectic commercial block was built in 1916 and housed the first automobile repair shop in Richmond.

It is no longer standing.
