= Samuel and Lana Ewing House =

- U.S. National Register of Historic Places
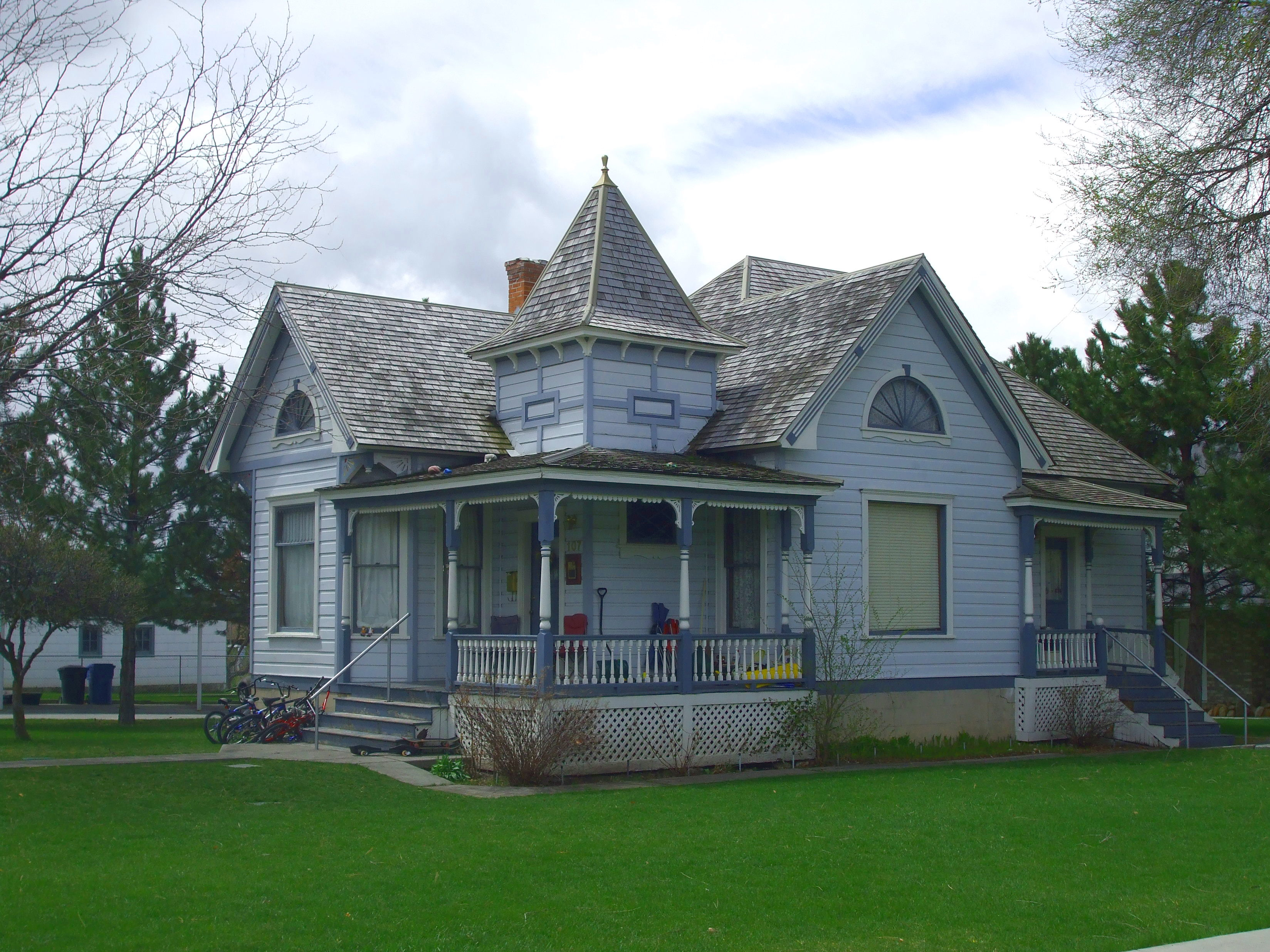

- Location within Utah Location within the United States
- Location: 107 S. 100 East, Smithfield, Utah
- Coordinates: 41°50′02″N 111°49′46″W
- Area: less than one acre
- Built: 1904
- Built by: Ewing, Samuel P.
- Architectural style: Queen Anne
- NRHP reference No.: 93001576
- Added to NRHP: January 28, 1994

The Samuel and Lana Ewing House. at 107 S. 100 East in Smithfield, Utah, is a house with Queen Anne-style features. It was listed on the National Register of Historic Places in 1994.

Built around 1904, it is a one-story frame house upon a somewhat raised stone foundation.

It has a square tower, while round towers with conical roofs are more common in Queen Anne houses.
