= Tony Grove Ranger Station Historic District =

Historic district in Utah, United States

- U.S. National Register of Historic Places
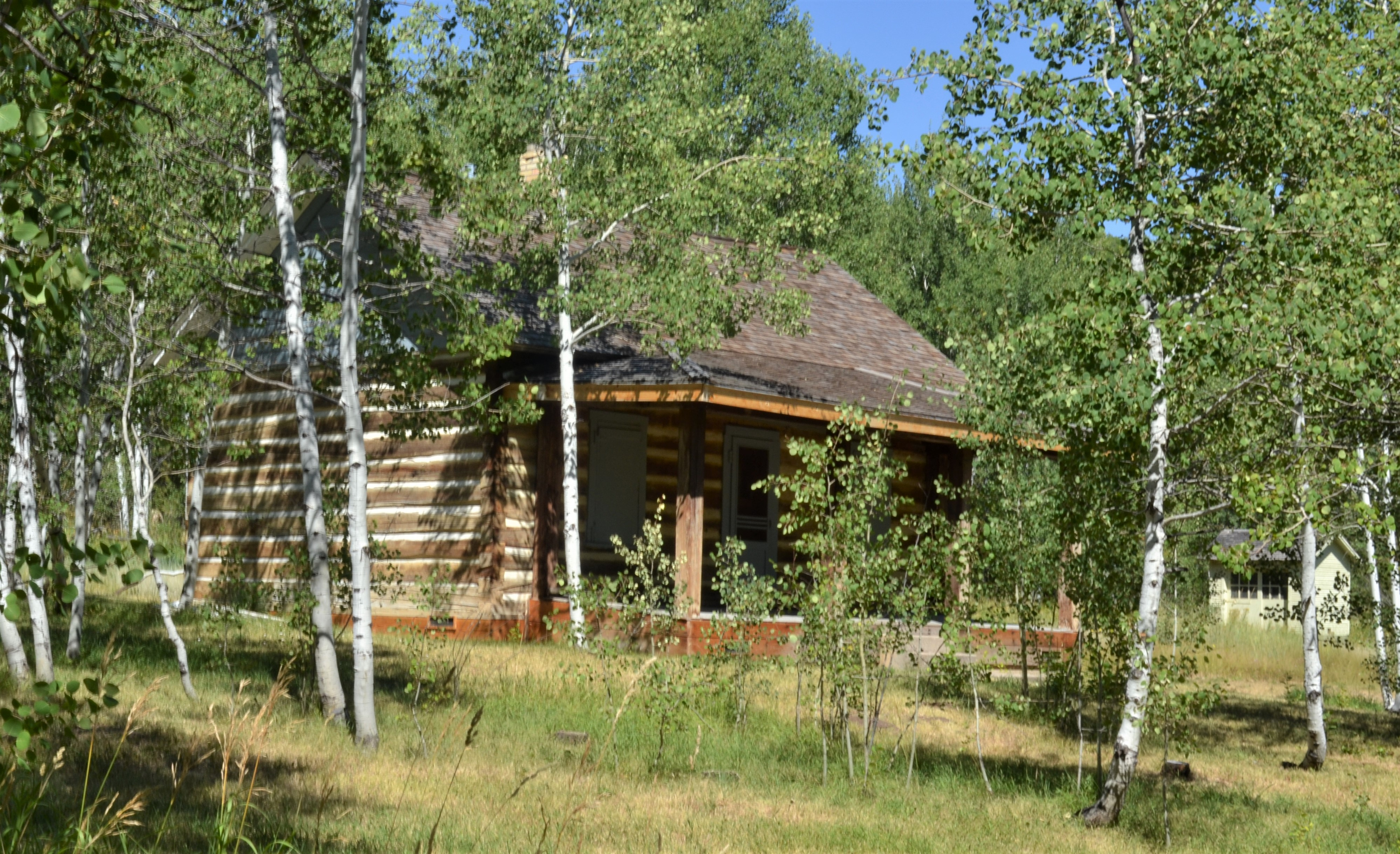

- Location within Utah Location within the United States
- Location: U.S. Route 89, 23 miles (37 km) northeast of Logan, Utah in the Wasatch-Cache National Forest
- Coordinates: 41°53′08″N 111°33′59″W
- Area: 13.7 acres (5.5 ha)
- Built: c.1907; 1937-39
- Built by: U.S. Forest Service, Civilian Conservation Corps
- Architectural style: Log cabin
- NRHP reference No.: 92000338
- Added to NRHP: April 13, 1992

The Tony Grove Ranger Station Historic District, in Cache County, Utah near Logan, Utah, was listed as a historic district on the National Register of Historic Places in 1992. The listing included three contributing buildings and a contributing site on 13.7 acres (5.5 ha).

It is located off U.S. Route 89, about 23 miles (37 km) northeast of Logan, Utah in Cache National Forest.

It has also been known as Tony Grove Memorial Ranger Station, or Tony Grove Nursery, or Tony Grove Ranger District.

It has an original log cabin built around 1907, or at least between 1907 and 1911, "shortly after the passage of the Sundry Civil Appropriations Act of 1897 that enabled the creation of the U.S. Forest Service. The other structures are of frame construction and were added between 1937 and 1939. Their construction was related to the use of the site as a tree nursery." The cabin is " architecturally significant as an excellent example of an early twentieth-century log cabin. Its saw-hewn logs and half-dovetail notching exhibit a level of craftsmanship unmatched by other extant cabins of the period in this area."

It was home of the Tony Grove Nursery established in 1936 with goal to produce seedlings to revive national forests in Utah and Idaho. Various nursery-related buildings were built by the Civilian Conservation Corps (CCC), and 1.5 million seedlings were started at the nursery. Nursery stock produced, valued at $17,954, was delivered in 1942 to the School of Forestry at Utah State Agricultural College and to fourteen national forests in U.S. Forest Service Region IV.

The ranger station was restored and was going to be made available for rental in 2016.
