= Logan High School Gymnasium =

- U.S. National Register of Historic Places
- Location within Utah Location within the United States
- Location: 162 W. 100 South, Logan, Utah
- Coordinates: 41°43′44″N 111°50′16″W
- Area: 1.4 acres (0.57 ha)
- Built: 1935-36
- Architectural style: Art Deco
- MPS: Public Works Buildings TR
- NRHP reference No.: 85001844
- Added to NRHP: August 7, 1985

The Logan High School Gymnasium, at 162 W. 100 South in Logan, Utah, is an Art Deco building built in 1935–36. It was listed on the National Register of Historic Places in 1985.

It was built as a Public Works Administration project, one of 233 identified in Utah that were built during the 1930s and early 1940s, of which only 130 are known to have survived.

It appears that this gymnasium, which was within a complex of Logan High School buildings, was demolished in 1999 and replaced in 2000-01 by a new gymnasium, lobby, and storage area.
