= Family Life Building =

- Home Economics/Commons Building
- U.S. National Register of Historic Places
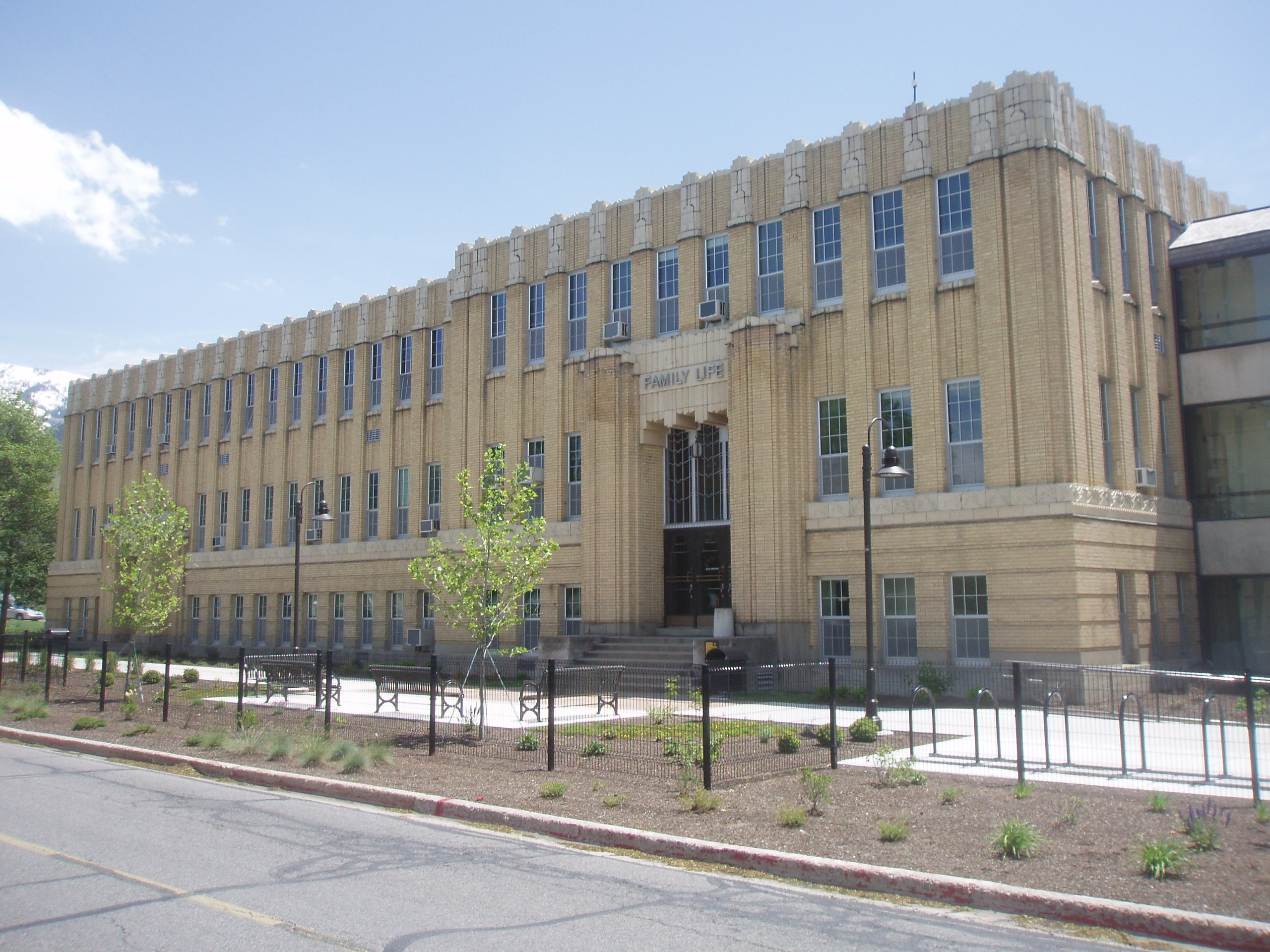

- Location within Utah Location within the United States
- Location: Off US 89, Utah State University, Logan, Utah
- Coordinates: 41°44′25″N 111°48′40″W
- Area: less than one acre
- Built: 1935
- Built by: Soren Jacobsen
- Architect: Hodgson & McClenahan
- Architectural style: Art Deco
- MPS: Public Works Buildings TR
- NRHP reference No.: 85000800
- Added to NRHP: April 1, 1985

The Family Life Building is a building on the Utah State University campus in Logan, Utah. It was built in 1935 as a Public Works Administration project to provide jobs during the Great Depression, and "to house the school's Home Economics Department and all student union activities." It was listed on the National Register of Historic Places as the Home Economics/Commons Building in 1985.

The large, two-story, flat-roofed building features narrow, recessed window panels and a crenelated parapet. Transoms include zig-zag tracery. Hodgson & McClenahan designed the building, and general contractor Soren Jacobsen of Logan oversaw construction.

The building is Art Deco in style and has been called "one of the best examples of the Art Deco architectural style in Utah." Located off U.S. Route 89, it is known as the Family Life Building.
