= River Heights, Utah =

City in Utah, United States

- City
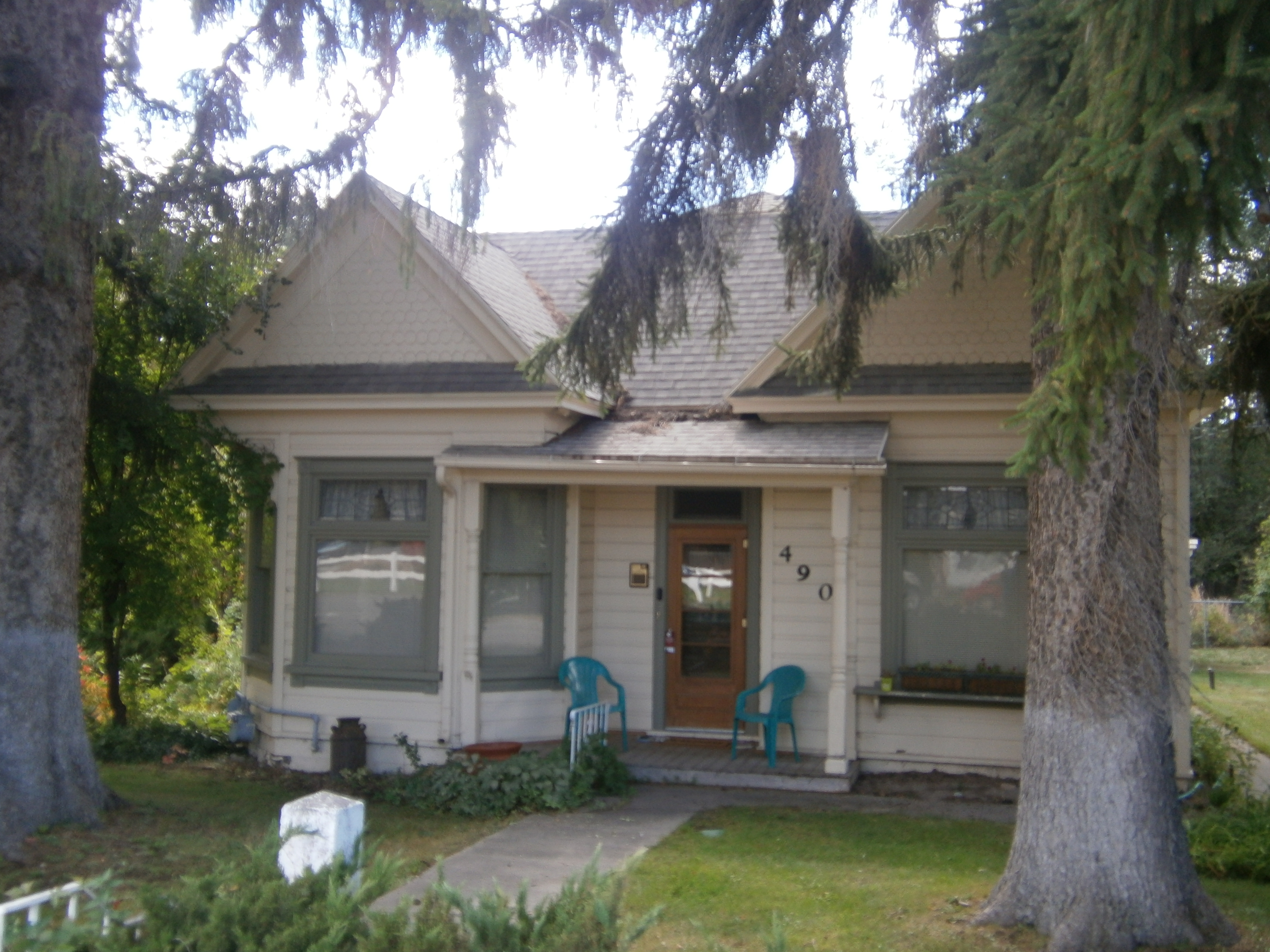
- The Erick and Ingrid Olson House is listed on the National Register of Historic Places.

- Location in Cache County and the state of Utah.
- Coordinates: 41°43′20″N 111°49′09″W
- Country: United States
- State: Utah
- County: Cache
- Settled: 1882
- Incorporated: October 31, 1934

Area
  - Total: 0.68 sq mi (1.75 km^{2})
  - Land: 0.68 sq mi (1.75 km^{2})
  - Water: 0 sq mi (0.00 km^{2})
- Elevation: 4,567 ft (1,392 m)

Population (2020)
  - Total: 2,144
  - Density: 3,072.7/sq mi (1,186.39/km^{2})
- Time zone: UTC-7 (Mountain (MST))
  - Summer (DST): UTC-6 (MDT)
- ZIP code: 84321
- Area code: 435
- FIPS code: 49-64120
- GNIS feature ID: 2410960
- Website: Official website

River Heights is a city in Cache County, Utah, United States. The population was 2,144 at the 2020 census. It is included in the Logan, Utah-Idaho (partial) Metropolitan Statistical Area.

== Geography ==
According to the United States Census Bureau, the city has a total area of 0.6 square mile (1.5 km^{2}), all land.

== Demographics ==
Historical population
Census	Pop.	Note	%±
1920	208		—
1930	283		36.1%
1940	288		1.8%
1950	468		62.5%
1960	880		88.0%
1970	1,008		14.5%
1980	1,211		20.1%
1990	1,274		5.2%
2000	1,496		17.4%
2010	1,734		15.9%
2020	2,144		23.6%
U.S. Decennial Census

=== 2020 census ===
As of the 2020 census, River Heights had a population of 2,144. The median age was 33.1 years. 33.5% of residents were under the age of 18 and 13.1% of residents were 65 years of age or older. For every 100 females there were 95.1 males, and for every 100 females age 18 and over there were 91.5 males age 18 and over.

100.0% of residents lived in urban areas, while 0.0% lived in rural areas.

There were 664 households in River Heights, of which 44.3% had children under the age of 18 living in them. Of all households, 74.4% were married-couple households, 6.3% were households with a male householder and no spouse or partner present, and 17.8% were households with a female householder and no spouse or partner present. About 14.1% of all households were made up of individuals and 7.2% had someone living alone who was 65 years of age or older.

There were 683 housing units, of which 2.8% were vacant. The homeowner vacancy rate was 0.7% and the rental vacancy rate was 0.0%.

Racial composition as of the 2020 census
Race	Number	Percent
White	1,931	90.1%
Black or African American	2	0.1%
American Indian and Alaska Native	3	0.1%
Asian	65	3.0%
Native Hawaiian and Other Pacific Islander	4	0.2%
Some other race	37	1.7%
Two or more races	102	4.8%
Hispanic or Latino (of any race)	109	5.1%

=== 2000 census ===
As of the 2000 census, there were 1,496 people, 477 households, and 390 families residing in the city. The population density was 2,583.8 inhabitants per square mile (997.6/km^{2}). There were 492 housing units at an average density of 849.8 per square mile (328.1/km^{2}). The racial makeup of the city was 96.66% White, 0.27% Native American, 0.74% Asian, 1.47% from other races, and 0.87% from two or more races. Hispanic or Latino of any race was 1.94% of the population.

There were 477 households, out of which 42.3% had children under the age of 18 living with them, 72.7% were married couples living together, 6.7% had a female householder with no husband present, and 18.2% were non-families. 16.8% of all households were made up of individuals, and 10.3% had someone living alone who was 65 years of age or older. The average household size was 3.14 and the average family size was 3.54.

In the city, the population was spread out, with 33.1% under the age of 18, 10.0% from 18 to 24, 24.2% from 25 to 44, 18.6% from 45 to 64, and 14.2% who were 65 years of age or older. The median age was 31 years. For every 100 females, there were 90.8 males. For every 100 females age 18 and over, there were 95.1 males.

The median income for a household in the city was $53,750, and the median income for a family was $60,000. Males had a median income of $48,194 versus $25,729 for females. The per capita income for the city was $24,068. About 2.2% of families and 5.2% of the population were below the poverty line, including 7.6% of those under age 18 and 2.9% of those age 65 or over.

== Notable people ==
- Michael Ballam - Director, Utah Festival Opera Company
- Reed C. Durham – Mormon scholar
