= Wellsville, Utah =

City in Utah, United States

- City
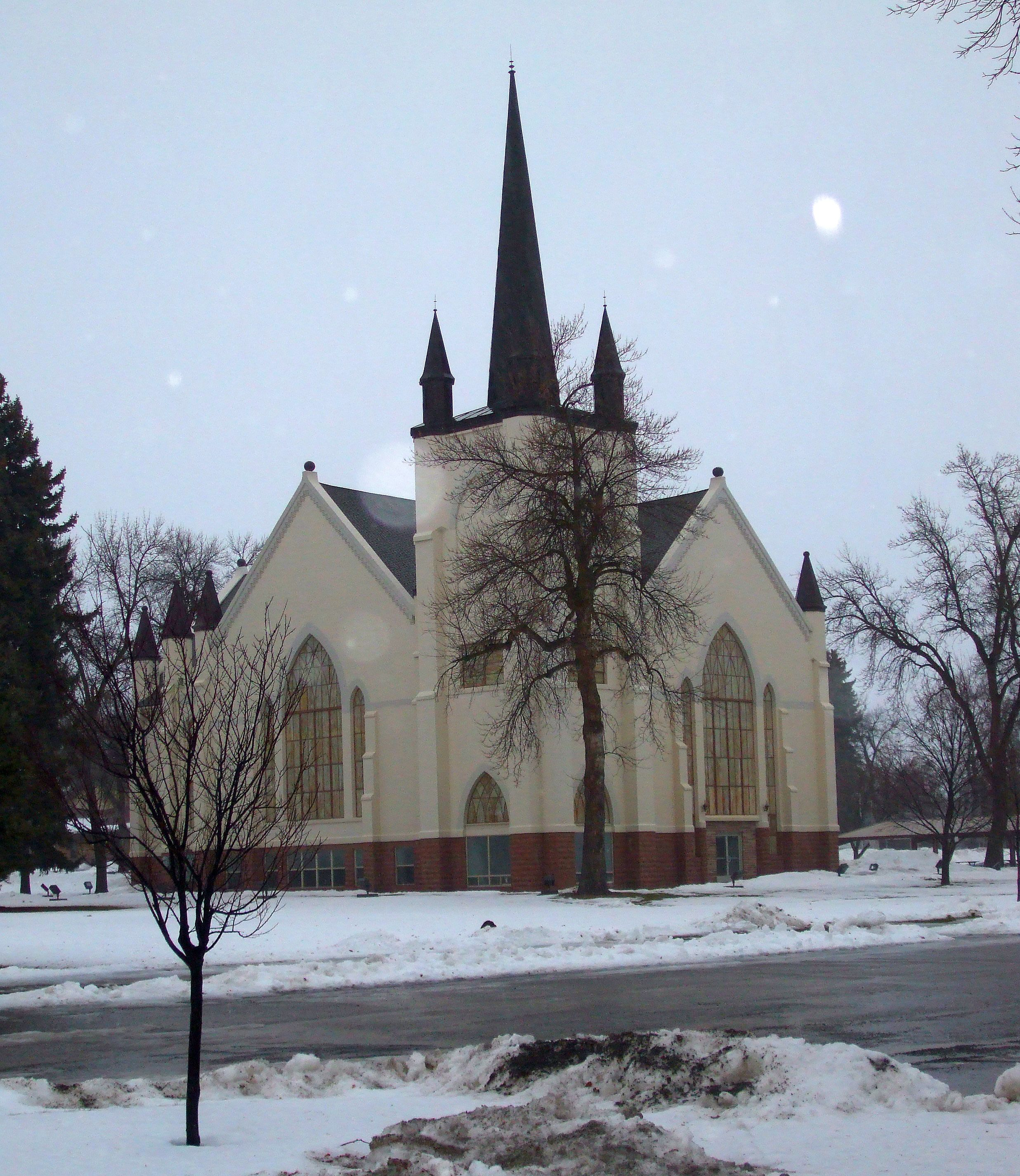
- The Wellsville Tabernacle, an early Latter-day Saint meetinghouse

- Location in Cache County and the state of Utah
- Coordinates: 41°38′08″N 111°55′59″W
- Country: United States
- State: Utah
- County: Cache
- Founded (as Maughan's Fort): 1856
- Named for: Daniel H. Wells

Area
  - Total: 7.28 sq mi (18.86 km^{2})
  - Land: 7.27 sq mi (18.83 km^{2})
  - Water: 0.015 sq mi (0.04 km^{2})
- Elevation: 4,600 ft (1,400 m)

Population (2020)
  - Total: 4,060
  - Density: 542.1/sq mi (209.32/km^{2})
- Time zone: UTC-7 (Mountain (MST))
  - Summer (DST): UTC-6 (MDT)
- ZIP code: 84339
- Area code: 435
- FIPS code: 49-82620
- GNIS feature ID: 2412211
- Website: www.wellsvillecity.com

Wellsville is a city in Cache County, Utah, United States. The population was 4,060 at the 2020 census. Wellsville is located at the base of the Wellsville mountain range. It is included in the Logan, Utah-Idaho Metropolitan Statistical Area.

Wellsville is home to the Utah State University South Farm as well as the Utah State University Equestrian Center, the American Heritage Center and the Wellsville Tabernacle.

Wellsville was laid out in 1856, and named after Daniel H. Wells, a LDS Church leader.

== Geography ==
Wellsville is on the Eastern side of the Wellsville Mountains. According to the United States Census Bureau, the city has a total area of 6.6 square miles (17.1 km^{2}), of which 0.02 square miles (0.04 km^{2}), or 0.21%, is water.

=== Climate ===
Large seasonal temperature differences typify this climatic region, with warm to hot (and often humid) summers and cold (sometimes severely cold) winters. According to the Köppen Climate Classification system, Wellsville has a humid continental climate, abbreviated "Dfb" on climate maps.

== Demographics ==
Historical population
Census	Pop.	Note	%±
1870	885		—
1880	1,193		34.8%
1890	1,045		−12.4%
1900	908		−13.1%
1910	1,195		31.6%
1920	1,298		8.6%
1930	1,270		−2.2%
1940	1,402		10.4%
1950	1,241		−11.5%
1960	1,106		−10.9%
1970	1,267		14.6%
1980	1,952		54.1%
1990	2,206		13.0%
2000	2,729		23.7%
2010	3,432		25.8%
2020	4,060		18.3%
U.S. Decennial Census

=== 2020 census ===
As of the 2020 census, Wellsville had a population of 4,060. The median age was 31.7 years. 35.8% of residents were under the age of 18 and 11.7% of residents were 65 years of age or older. For every 100 females there were 107.0 males, and for every 100 females age 18 and over there were 102.0 males age 18 and over.

89.1% of residents lived in urban areas, while 10.9% lived in rural areas.

There were 1,196 households in Wellsville, of which 46.7% had children under the age of 18 living in them. Of all households, 76.9% were married-couple households, 8.2% were households with a male householder and no spouse or partner present, and 12.2% were households with a female householder and no spouse or partner present. About 12.6% of all households were made up of individuals and 6.1% had someone living alone who was 65 years of age or older.

There were 1,223 housing units, of which 2.2% were vacant. The homeowner vacancy rate was 0.2% and the rental vacancy rate was 0.8%.

Racial composition as of the 2020 census
Race	Number	Percent
White	3,770	92.9%
Black or African American	17	0.4%
American Indian and Alaska Native	23	0.6%
Asian	11	0.3%
Native Hawaiian and Other Pacific Islander	4	0.1%
Some other race	65	1.6%
Two or more races	170	4.2%
Hispanic or Latino (of any race)	155	3.8%

=== 2000 census ===
As of the 2000 census, there were 2,729 people, 778 households, and 686 families residing in the city. The population density was 429.3 inhabitants per square mile (165.8/km^{2}). There were 815 housing units at an average density of 128.2 per square mile (49.5/km^{2}). The racial makeup of the city was 97.29% White, 0.40% Native American, 0.15% Asian, 0.15% Pacific Islander, 1.73% from other races, and 0.29% from two or more races. Hispanic or Latino of any race were 2.79% of the population.

There were 778 households, out of which 55.3% had children under 18 living with them, 79.8% were married couples living together, 5.4% had a female householder with no husband present, and 11.8% were non-families. 9.8% of all households were made up of individuals, and 5.7% had someone living alone who was 65 years of age or older. The average household size was 3.51, and the average family size was 3.79.

The city's population was spread out, with 38.3% under 18, 10.2% from 18 to 24, 26.9% from 25 to 44, 16.9% from 45 to 64, and 7.7% who were 65 years of age or older. The median age was 26 years. For every 100 females, there were 104.0 males. For every 100 females aged 18 and over, there were 101.4 males.

The median income for a household in the city was $49,115, and the median income for a family was $51,023. Males had a median income of $37,244 versus $21,750 for females. The per capita income for the city was $16,171. About 5.8% of families and 6.4% of the population were below the poverty line, including 8.1% of those under age 18 and 8.8% of those aged 65 or over.

== Notable person ==
- Earl W. Bascom, rodeo cowboy, international artist, inventor, Utah Sports Hall of Fame inductee, worked for the McBride Ranch of Wellsville in 1934
