= National Register of Historic Places listings in Uintah County, Utah =

Location of Uintah County in Utah

This is a list of the National Register of Historic Places listings in Uintah County, Utah.

This is intended to be a complete list of the properties and districts on the National Register of Historic Places in Uintah County, Utah, United States. Latitude and longitude coordinates are provided for many National Register properties and districts; these locations may be seen together in a map.

There are 21 properties and districts listed on the National Register in the county, including two National Historic Landmarks.

This National Park Service list is complete through NPS recent listings posted May 1, 2026.

== Current listings ==
	Name on the Register	Image	Date listed	Location	City or town	Description
1	Bank of Vernal	Bank of Vernal	December 4, 2008 (#08001155)	3 W. Main St. 40°27′20″N 109°31′44″W	Vernal	1916 bank building significant for its role in local economic development, for being one of Vernal's best-preserved early-20th-century commercial buildings, and for famously having its 40 tons of bricks shipped via parcel post, prompting a national change in postal regulations.
2	Carter Road		May 21, 2001 (#00000354)	Ashley National Forest; 40°47′22″N 109°45′33″W	Ashley National Forest	Traces of a 36-mile (58 km) section of a military road built 1881–82 built to supply the first Army post on the Uintah and Ouray Indian Reservation, and later used by miners and local residents until 1924. Extends into Daggett County.
3	Cockleburr Wash Petroglyphs	Cockleburr Wash Petroglyphs	September 4, 1980 (#80003974)	Address restricted	Jensen	Fremont culture petroglyphs of elaborate humanoids in the distinctive Vernal style, as well as bighorn sheep and abstract shapes.
4	Lewis Curry House	Lewis Curry House	July 26, 1982 (#82004166)	189 S. Vernal Ave. 40°27′11″N 109°31′41″W	Vernal	1910 house of Lewis Curry (1861–1922), one of Vernal's founders and early community leaders—a banker, businessman, politician at the county and state level, and patron of the arts.
5	Desolation Canyon	Desolation Canyon	November 24, 1968 (#68000057)	Green River between Nine Mile Creek and Florence Creek; 39°38′32″N 110°00′40″W	Ouray vicinity	Remote, 45-mile (72 km) stretch of canyon commemorating explorer John Wesley Powell (1834–1902); virtually unchanged from when the Powell Geographic Expedition of 1869 first entered its uncharted territory. Extends into Carbon, Emery, and Grand Counties.
6	Dine-A-Ville Dinosaur	Dine-A-Ville Dinosaur	November 13, 2023 (#100009526)	905 E. Main St. 40°27′22″N 109°30′41″W	Vernal	Iconic dinosaur statue built in 1958 to promote a local motel, attesting to the post-World War II boom in automobile tourism and the vernacular art used as roadside attractions. Moved and renamed Dinah the Pink Dinosaur in 1999.
7	Earl Douglass Workshop–Laboratory	Earl Douglass Workshop–Laboratory	December 19, 1986 (#86003400)	Quarry Entrance Rd. 40°26′27″N 109°18′07″W	Dinosaur National Monument	Circa-1915 field laboratory of Earl Douglass (1862–1931), the paleontologist who discovered and led excavations at the adjacent dinosaur fossil bed.
8	Fenn–Bullock House	Fenn–Bullock House	March 25, 1999 (#99000401)	388 W. 100 North; 40°27′26″N 109°32′10″W	Vernal	Large side passage house built circa 1901; Vernal's leading example of fine Victorian architecture.
9	Gibson–Sowards House	Gibson–Sowards House	November 24, 1997 (#97001465)	3110 N. 250 West; 40°30′04″N 109°32′02″W	Vernal vicinity	One of the Vernal area's few remaining 19th-century frame Victorian houses, built circa 1891. Listing includes seven outbuildings and structures.
10	Little Brush Creek Petroglyphs	Little Brush Creek Petroglyphs	March 15, 1976 (#76001837)	Address restricted	Vernal vicinity	Vernal style rock art panels that were the first to confirm the Fremont culture mixed deeply incised carving with thickly painted elements.
11	Manfred and Ethel Martin House	Manfred and Ethel Martin House	December 29, 2004 (#04001422)	163 N. Vernal Ave. 40°27′29″N 109°31′44″W	Vernal	1912 house with attached doctor's office; an early medical facility from a period of local growth and one of Utah's few examples of Shingle style architecture.
12	McConkie Ranch Petroglyphs	McConkie Ranch Petroglyphs	September 25, 1975 (#75001828)	6264 N. McConkie Rd. 40°32′47″N 109°38′11″W	Vernal vicinity	Two-mile (3 km) stretch of petroglyphs ascribed to the Fremont culture or their predecessors; the type site for the Vernal style characterized by elaborate humanoid figures. Maintained as a tourist attraction.
13	Josie Bassett Morris Ranch Complex	Josie Bassett Morris Ranch Complex	December 19, 1986 (#86003394)	Cub Creek Rd. 40°25′31″N 109°10′30″W	Dinosaur National Monument	Ranch complex with eight contributing properties built 1914–1925 by Josie Bassett Morris (1874–1964), an independent female homesteader and colorful local character once associated with the outlaws of Browns Park.
14	Quarry Visitor Center	Quarry Visitor Center	December 19, 1986 (#86003401)	Quarry Entrance Rd. 40°26′26″N 109°18′04″W	Dinosaur National Monument	Unique visitor center built over a fossil bed 1957–1958; a preeminent example of the Mission 66 initiative and one that helped legitimize modern architecture in the National Park system. Redubbed Quarry Exhibit Hall.
15	St. Paul's Episcopal Church and Lodge	St. Paul's Episcopal Church and Lodge	January 3, 1985 (#85000049)	226 W. Main St. 40°27′22″N 109°31′59″W	Vernal	1901 Gothic Revival church and 1909 American Craftsman girls' dormitory later used as a hospital; significant for their architecture and association with the Episcopal Church in the Uinta Basin.
16	William and Emily Siddoway House	William and Emily Siddoway House	April 5, 2006 (#06000231)	1055 N. Vernal Ave. 40°28′16″N 109°31′46″W	Vernal	Vernal's only Queen Anne house, built in 1898 for an influential couple in the early economic and civic development of the Uinta Basin. Listing includes a circa-1915 garage.
17	Francis 'Frank' and Eunice Smith House	Francis 'Frank' and Eunice Smith House	March 29, 2001 (#01000317)	1847 N. 3000 West; 40°28′56″N 109°35′13″W	Maeser	1913 house and three outbuildings, distinguished as one of the area's few American Foursquare homes and for the fine carpentry and woodworking by its first owner, a prolific local builder.
18	Vernal Tithing Office	Vernal Tithing Office	January 25, 1985 (#85000286)	186 S. 500 West; 40°27′12″N 109°32′18″W	Vernal	Well-preserved example—built in 1887—of the tithing buildings of the Church of Jesus Christ of Latter-day Saints. Moved in 1958 to became part of a Daughters of Utah Pioneers museum.
19	Washington School–Vernal LDS Relief Society Hall	Washington School–Vernal LDS Relief Society Hall	December 29, 2004 (#04001423)	252 N. 500 West; 40°27′34″N 109°32′15″W	Vernal	1895 schoolhouse constructed by volunteer labor and a log outbuilding. Became a Relief Society hall 1913–1928, thereby encapsulating two elements of Vernal's early social history.
20	Whiterocks Village Site	Whiterocks Village Site	January 1, 1976 (#76001838)	Address restricted	Whiterocks vicinity	Fremont village site roughly dating to 800–950 CE which yielded more pottery than all previously known Uinta Basin Fremont sites combined.
21	Wong Sing Warehouse		August 19, 2024 (#100010522)	7267 E. U.S. Hwy. 40/191; 40°18′09″N 109°51′49″W	Fort Duchesne	Circa-1890 warehouse, the only surviving remnant of a mercantile complex established by Wong Sing (d. 1934), an unusually successful Chinese American merchant.

== See also ==
- List of National Historic Landmarks in Utah
- National Register of Historic Places listings in Utah
- National Register of Historic Places listings in Dinosaur National Monument
