= Dinah the Pink Dinosaur =

Large dinosaur statue in Vernal, Utah, United States

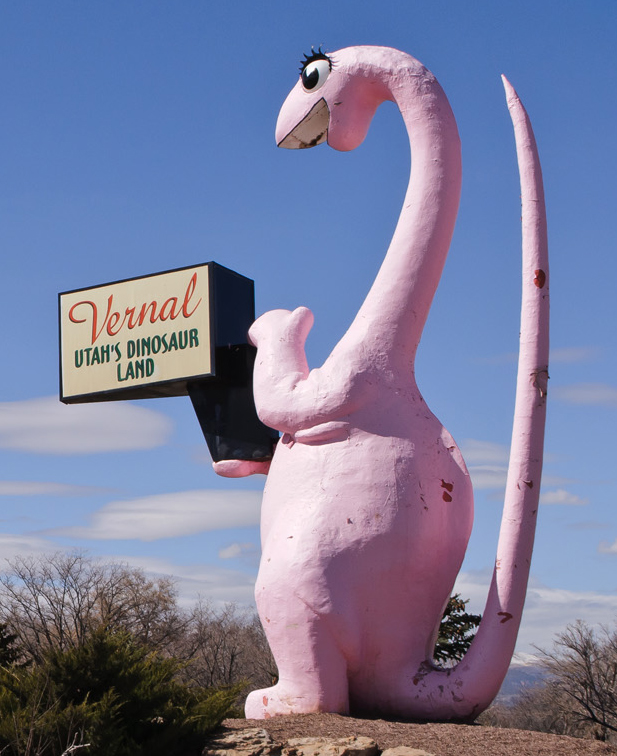
- Dinah the Pink Dinosaur, March 2012
- Year: 1958
- Medium: Steel, fiberglass
- Subject: Dinosaur
- Dimensions: 12 m (40 ft)
- Weight: 4,200 pounds (1,900 kg)
- Location: Vernal, Utah, United States; 40°27′22.3″N 109°30′40.3″W
- Owner: City of Vernal, Utah
- Dine-A-Ville Dinosaur
- U.S. National Register of Historic Places
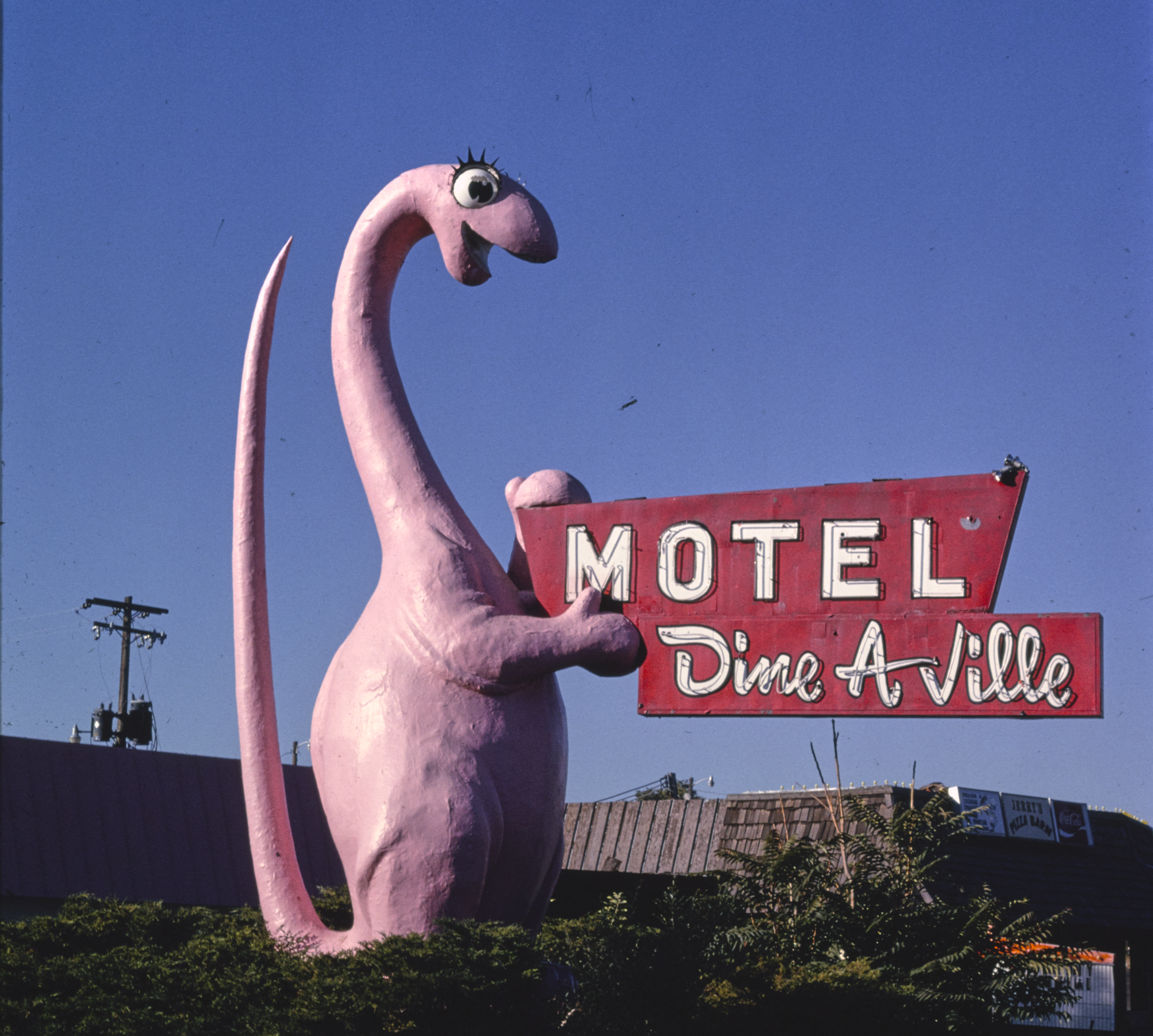
- Original Dine-A-Ville Motel Sign, 1991

- Location within Utah Location within the United States
- Location: Vernal, Utah
- Built: 1958
- NRHP reference No.: 100009526
- Added to NRHP: November 13, 2023

Dinah the Pink Dinosaur (sometimes referred to as Dinah the Dinosaur) is a 40-foot (12 m) tall anthropomorphized statue of a dinosaur, located just off Main Street (US-40) in Vernal, Utah, United States, that is listed on the National Register of Historic Places (NRHP). Dinah is painted in a custom paint color, Dinah Pink.

== Background ==
The statue weighs 4,200 pounds (1,900 kg) and is composed of steel and pink fiberglass. It was originally built in 1958 to hold a sign for the Dine-A-Ville Motel and served this purpose until the motel went out of business and was demolished. It was later moved to a city park in the eastern part of town and now holds a sign welcoming visitors that reads "Vernal—Utah's Dinosaur Land".

It was listed on the RHP on November 13, 2023.

The statue of Dinah was hit in the tail by a sleep-deprived motorist named Brian Dickey on May 22, 2024, causing the tail to be severed. The motorist was unharmed. The tail would be reattached in June of 2024, with the statue being given a new coat of paint along with it.

== See also ==
- National Register of Historic Places listings in Uintah County, Utah
- Dinosaur (pigeon statue)
