= Lewis Curry House =

Historic house in Vernal, Utah, United States

- U.S. National Register of Historic Places
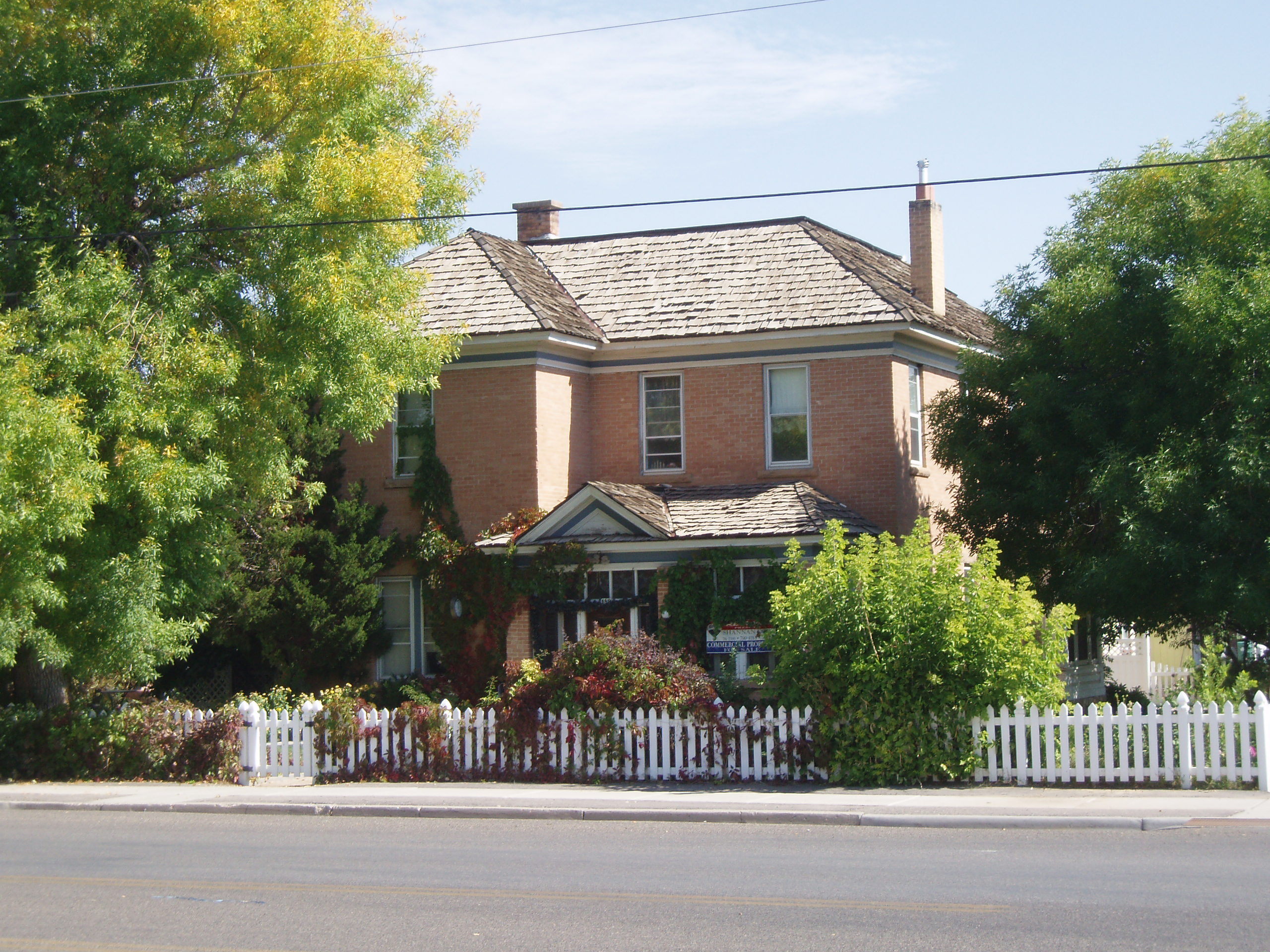
- The house in 2010

- Location within Utah Location within the United States
- Location: 189 South Vernal Avenue, Vernal, Utah
- Coordinates: 40°26′39″N 109°31′39″W
- Area: less than one acre
- Built: 1910
- NRHP reference No.: 82004166
- Added to NRHP: July 26, 1982

The Lewis Curry House is a historic two-story house in Veral, Utah, United States.

== Description ==
The house was built in 1910 for Lewis Curry, the manager of the Bank of Vernal. Curry was Presbyterian, and he later served as a member of the Utah House of Representatives. Curry died in 1922, and his brother Matt Curry married his widow, Sallie, and served in the Utah House of Representatives until 1939. The house was inherited by a son, David H. Curry. It has been listed on the National Register of Historic Places since July 26, 1982.

== See also ==
- National Register of Historic Places listings in Uintah County, Utah
