= Richmond Tithing Office =

- U.S. National Register of Historic Places
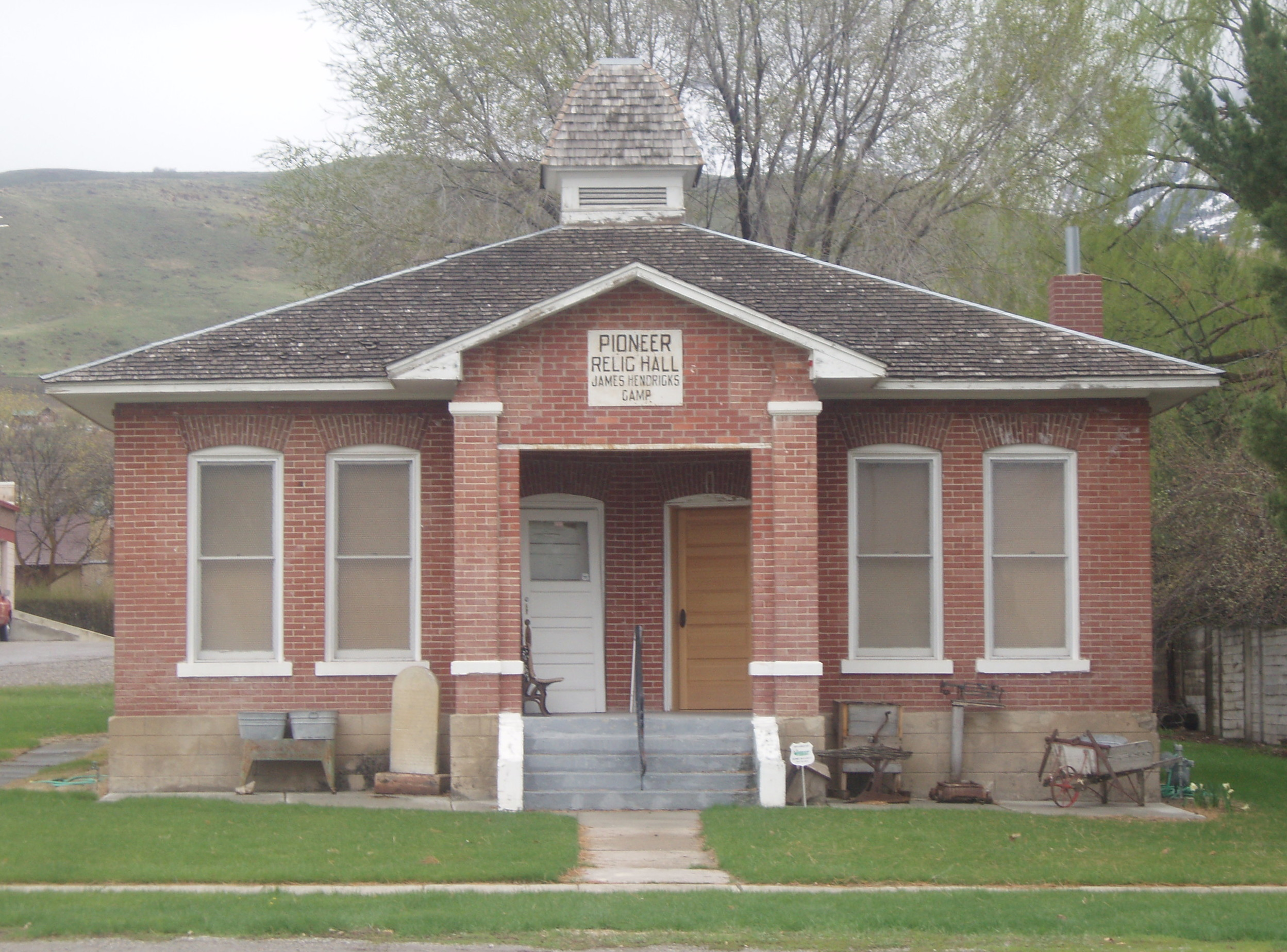
- Building in 2010

- Location within Utah
- Location: 31 S. State St., Richmond, Utah
- Coordinates: 41°55′20″N 111°48′27″W
- Area: less than one acre
- Built: 1907
- Built by: Latter Day Saints Church; James Lewis Burnham
- Architectural style: Late Victorian, Eclectic/Pyramid Cottage
- MPS: Tithing Offices and Granaries of the Mormon Church TR
- NRHP reference No.: 85000256
- Added to NRHP: January 25, 1985

The Richmond Tithing Office, also known as Bishop's Storehouse, in Richmond, Utah, was built in 1907. It was listed on the National Register of Historic Places in 1985.

It is a one-story square red brick building with a pyramid roof, built upon a coursed ashlar foundation. It has a projecting gabled pavilion with a flat arched opening on its symmetrical front facade, with attached pilasters. A small domed cupola surmounts the roof.

It served as a tithing building for the local Church of Jesus Christ of Latter-day Saints. It was built to a standard plan for tithing offices produced in about 1905, one of at least three standard plans; the Sandy Tithing Office (also surviving and NRHP-listed) and tithing offices in Manti and Panguitch are nearly identical, and the Hyrum Stake Tithing Office (also surviving and NRHP-listed) is very similar.

The building is significant "as one of about ten tithing offices which, having been built according to standard plans issued from church headquarters, represent the first known instances of centralized building administration in the LDS church."
