= Vernal Tithing Office =

- U.S. National Register of Historic Places
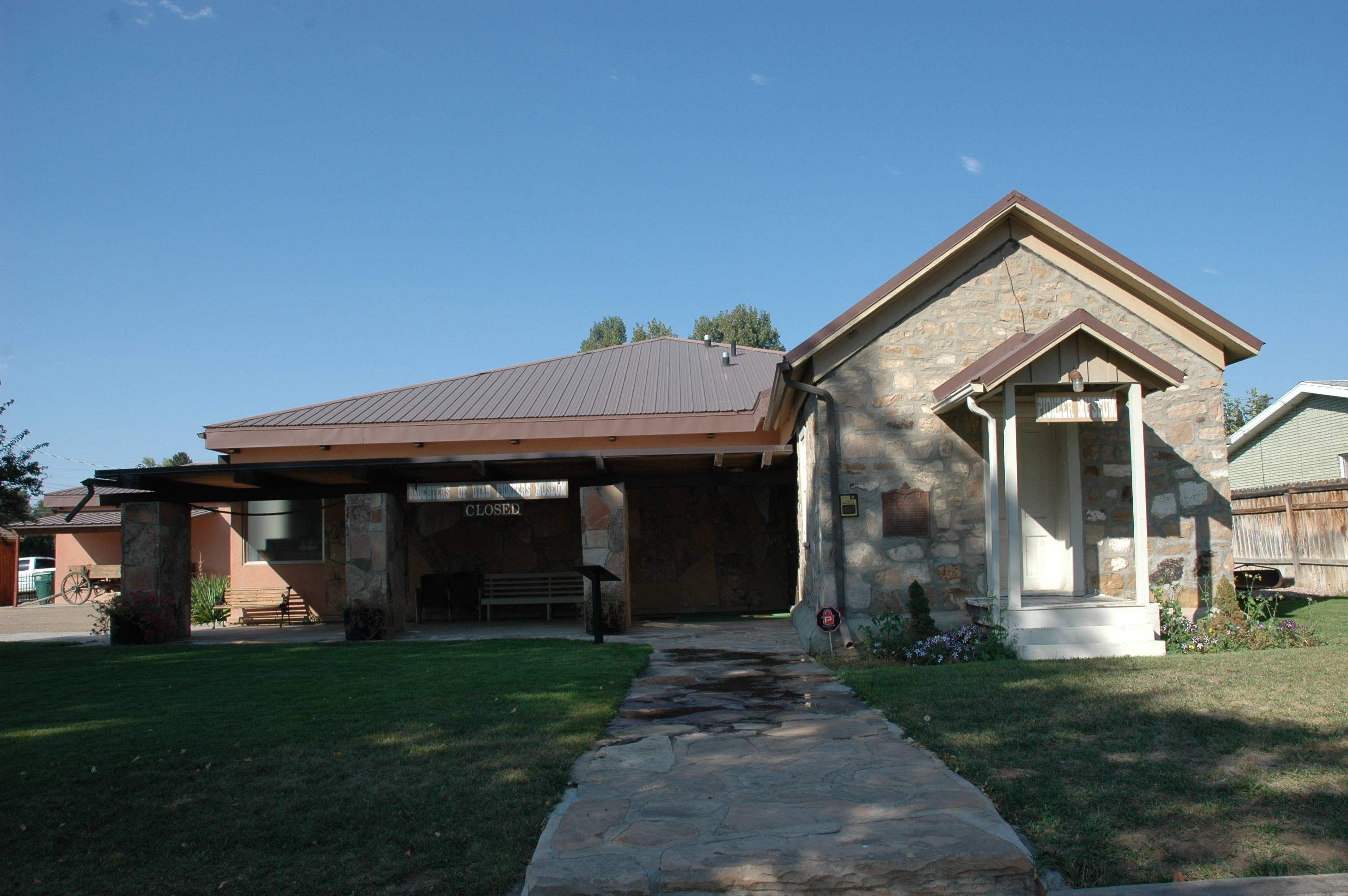
- The building in 2010

- Location within Utah Location within the United States
- Location: NW Corner of 500 West and 200 South, Vernal, Utah
- Coordinates: 40°27′11″N 109°32′16″W
- Area: less than one acre
- Built: 1887
- Built by: Harley Mowery
- Architectural style: Greek Revival
- MPS: Tithing Offices and Granaries of the Mormon Church TR
- NRHP reference No.: 85000286
- Added to NRHP: January 25, 1985

The Vernal Tithing Office is a historic building in Vernal, Utah. It was built in 1887 by Harley Mowery as a tithing building for the Church of Jesus Christ of Latter-day Saints. It is a gable-front building with some elements of Greek Revival architectural style. It has been listed on the National Register of Historic Places since January 25, 1985.
