= Tithing buildings of the Church of Jesus Christ of Latter-day Saints =

Buildings belonging to the church of Jesus Christ of latter day saints

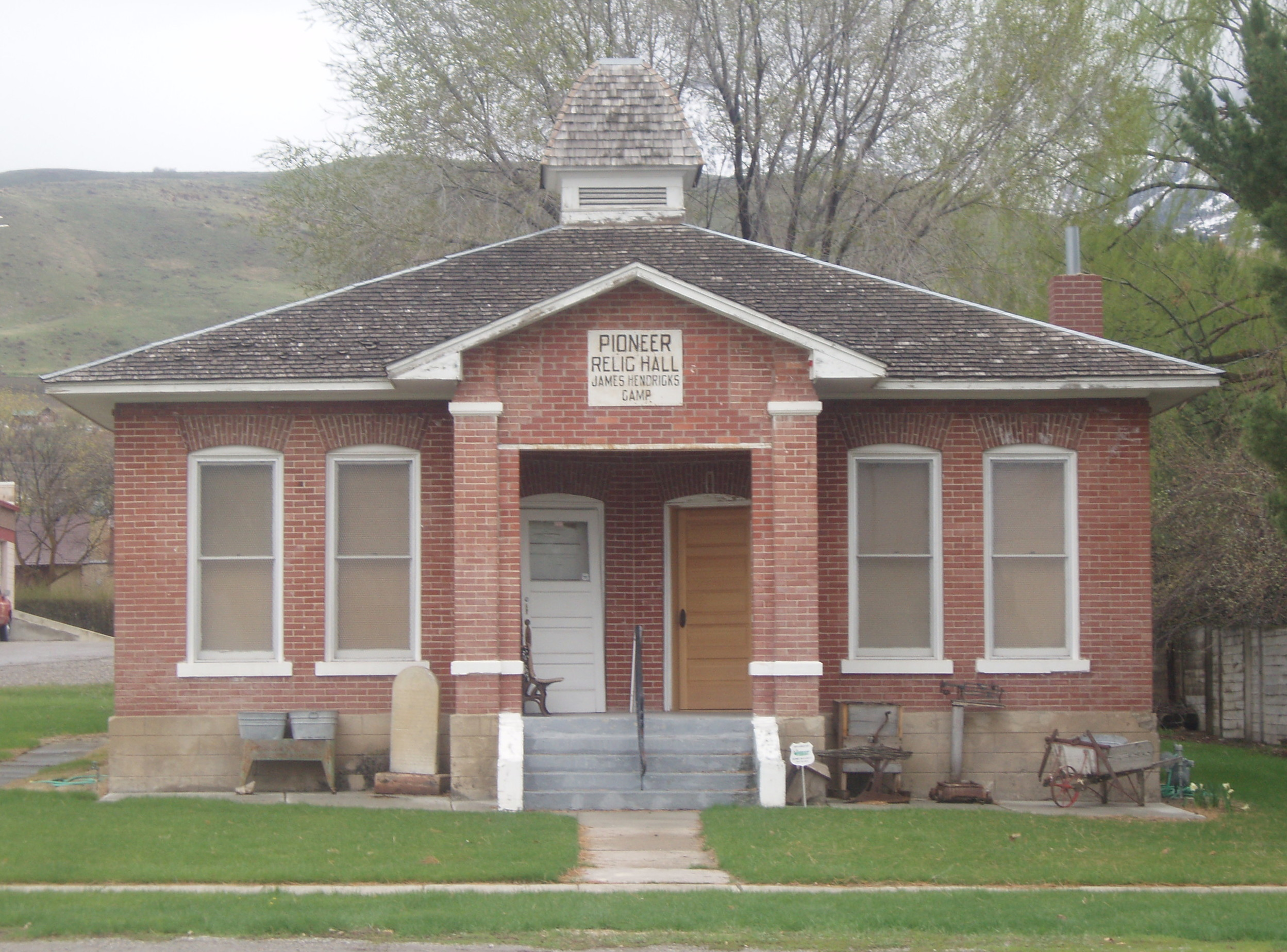
Richmond, Utah, tithing office

Tithing buildings of The Church of Jesus Christ of Latter-day Saints are storehouses related to tithing by members of the Church of Jesus Christ of Latter-day Saints. These are places where Mormons delivered tithes, often in form of agricultural products.

There were at least 28 in Utah and at least one in Idaho, which functioned between 1850 and 1910 or so. These facilities served for church members to be able to collect, store, and distribute the farm products donated as tithing, for at the time, agricultural products comprised most of what many people worked for and earned. Serving as nodes for economic activity and welfare, some of these were vital buildings for many of the early inhabitants of Utah who were members of the LDS church.

== Locations ==
A number of tithing buildings, also called tithing granaries, survive and are registered as historic sites listed on the U.S. National Register of Historic Places (NRHP). These include:

in Utah

1. Clarkston Tithing Granary (1905), Clarkston, Utah, NRHP-listed
2. Farmington Tithing Office (1907-1909), Farmington, Utah, NRHP-listed
3. Fairview Tithing Office/Bishop's Storehouse, Fairview, Utah, NRHP-listed
4. Huntington Tithing Granary, Huntington, Utah, NRHP-listed
5. Hyrum Stake Tithing Office, Hyrum, Utah, NRHP-listed
6. Kanosh Tithing Office, Kanosh, Utah, NRHP-listed
7. Lakeview Tithing Office (1899), Provo, Utah, NRHP-listed, built originally as a creamery and acquired by the local LDS church to serve as a tithing office in 1904 or after.
8. Leeds Tithing Office, Leeds, Utah, NRHP-listed
9. Lehi Ward Tithing Barn-Centennial Hall, Lehi, Utah, NRHP-listed
10. Lewiston Tithing Office and Granary, Lewiston, Utah, NRHP-listed
11. Loa Tithing Office, Loa, Utah, NRHP-listed
12. Meadow Tithing Granary, Meadow, Utah, NRHP-listed
13. Paradise Tithing Office, Paradise, Utah, NRHP-listed
14. Pine Valley Chapel and Tithing Office, Pine Valley, Washington County, Utah, NRHP-listed
15. Pleasant Grove Tithing Office, Pleasant Grove, Utah, NRHP-listed
16. Sandy Tithing Office, Sandy, Utah, NRHP-listed
17. Santa Clara Tithing Company, Santa Clara, Utah, NRHP-listed
18. Smithfield Tithing Office, Smithfield, Utah, NRHP-listed
19. Richmond Tithing Office, Richmond, Utah, NRHP-listed
20. Teasdale Tithing Granary, Teasdale, Utah, NRHP-listed
21. Vernal Tithing Office, Vernal, Utah, NRHP-listed

in Idaho

1. Old LDS Tithing/Paris Post Building, Paris, Idaho, NRHP-listed

== See also ==
- Tithe barn, common in Northern Europe
