= Carter Road =

Carter Road may refer to:

- Carter Road Promenade, Mumbai, India
- Carter Road (Utah), a historic military road in Utah in the United States
