= Smithfield Tithing Office =

- U.S. National Register of Historic Places
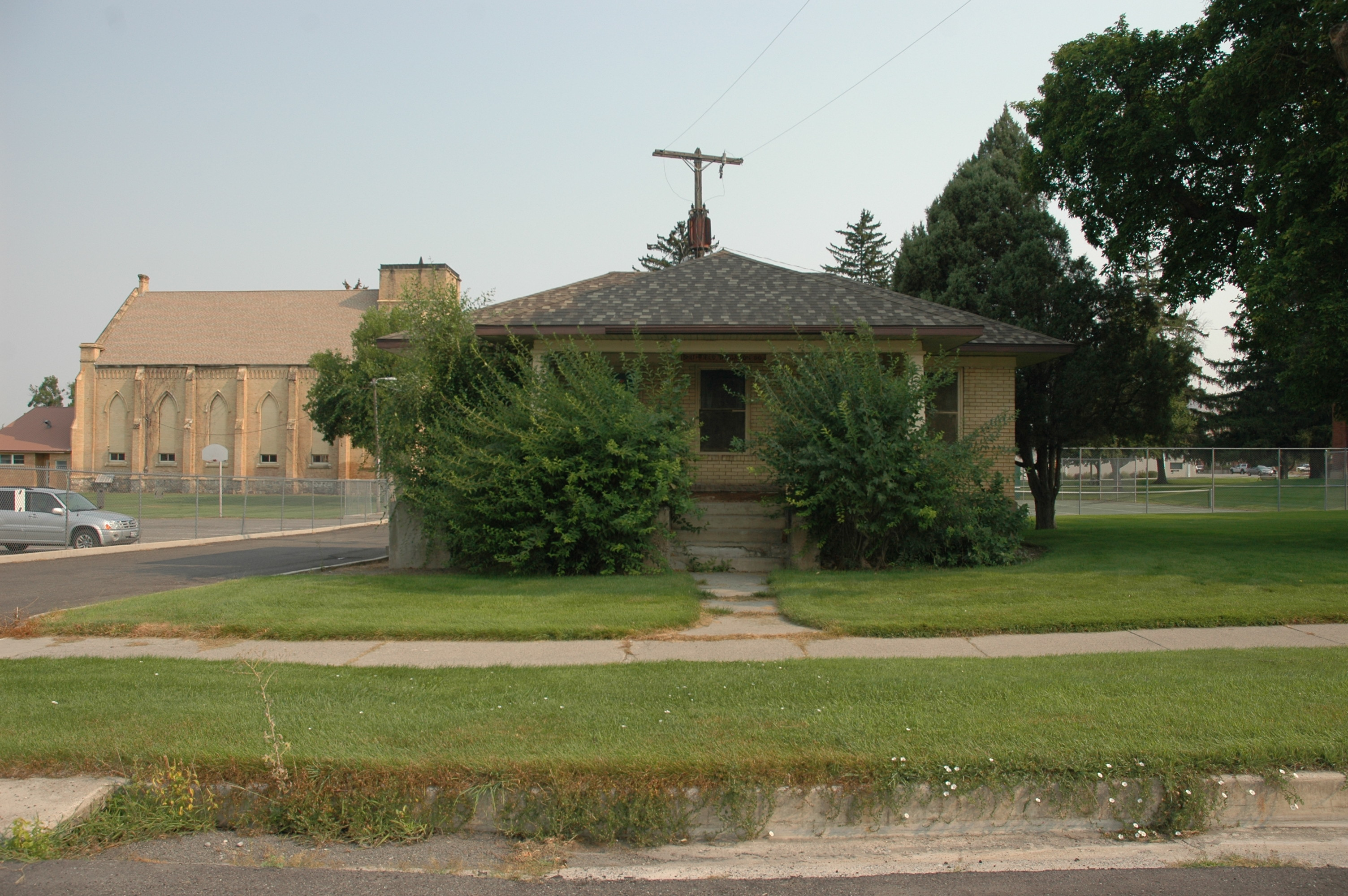

- Location within Utah Location within the United States
- Location: 35 W. Center, Smithfield, Utah
- Coordinates: 41°50′13″N 111°49′58″W
- Area: less than one acre
- Built: c.1910
- Architectural style: Bungalow
- MPS: Tithing Offices and Granaries of the Mormon Church TR
- NRHP reference No.: 85000258
- Added to NRHP: January 25, 1985

The Smithfield Tithing Office, at 35 W. Center in Smithfield, Utah, is a tithing building which was built sometime around 1910, between 1905 and 1920. It was listed on the National Register of Historic Places in 1985.

It is a one-story brick bungalow building.

It replaced a previous tithing building which was demolished during 1908–09.
