= Leeds Tithing Office =

- U.S. National Register of Historic Places
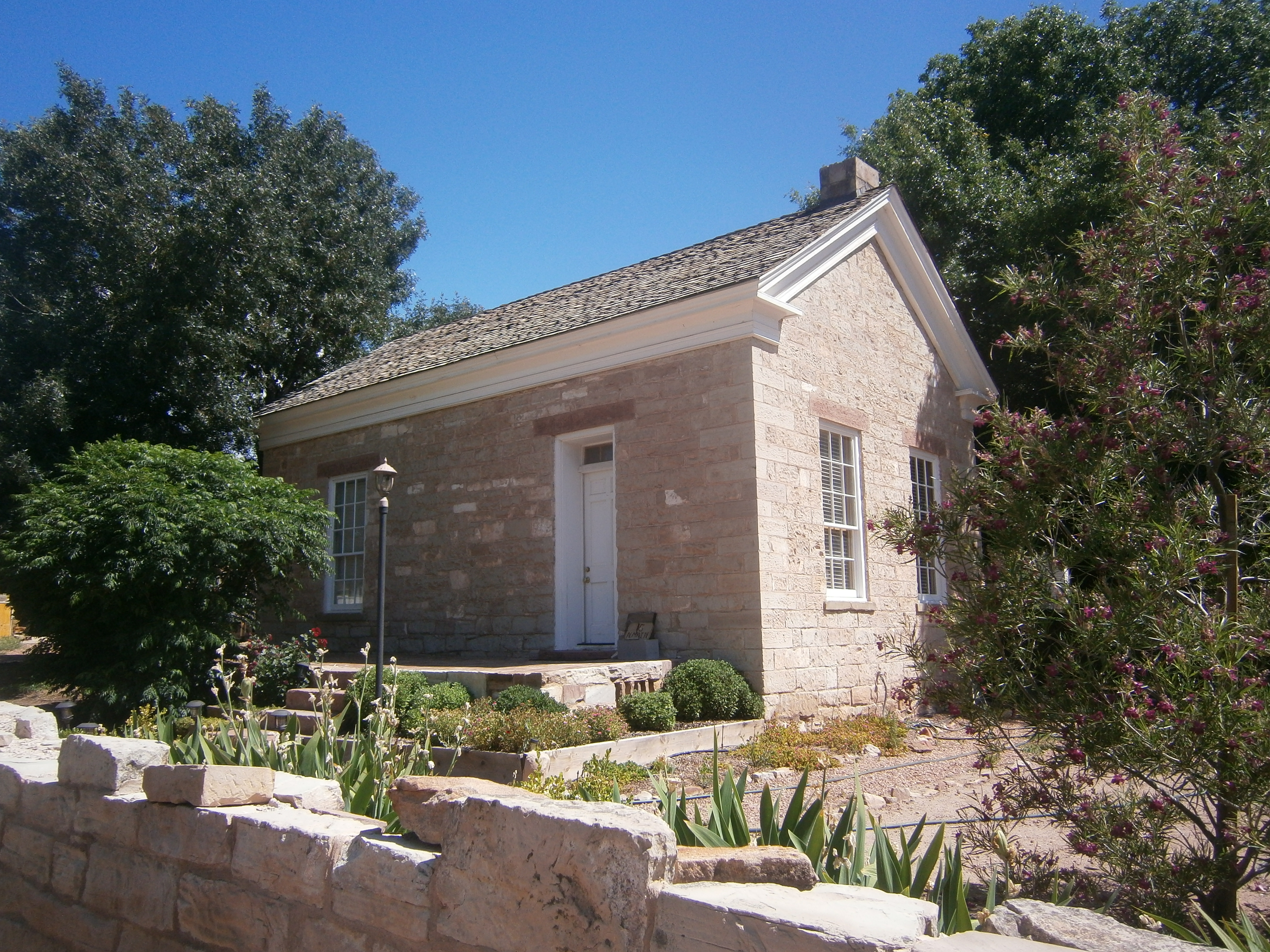
- The building in 2019

- Location within Utah Location within the United States
- Location: SW Corner 100 West and 100 North, Leeds, Utah
- Coordinates: 37°14′11″N 113°21′44″W
- Area: 0.2 acres (0.081 ha)
- Built: 1891
- Architectural style: Greek Revival
- MPS: Tithing Offices and Granaries of the Mormon Church TR
- NRHP reference No.: 85000291
- Added to NRHP: January 25, 1985

The Leeds Tithing Office is a historic building in Leeds, Utah. It was built in 1891-1892 as a tithing building for members of the Church of Jesus Christ of Latter-day Saints, and designed in the Greek Revival style. It remained the property of the church until 1968. It has been listed on the National Register of Historic Places since January 25, 1985.
