= Manfred and Ethel Martin House =

- U.S. National Register of Historic Places
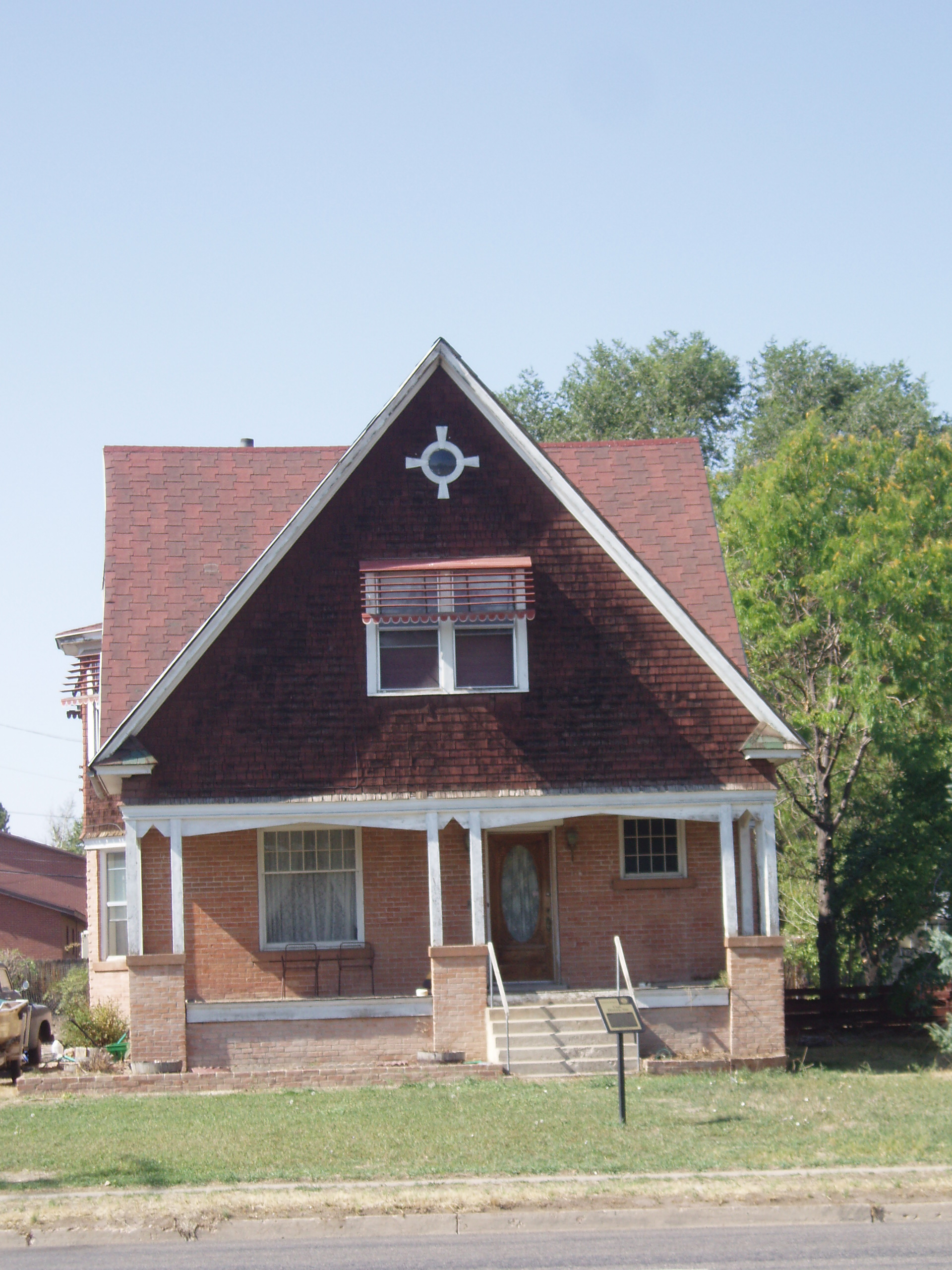

- Location within Utah
- Location: 163 N. Vernal Ave., Vernal, Utah
- Coordinates: 40°27′28″N 109°31′41″W
- Area: less than one acre
- Built: 1912
- Architectural style: Shingle Style
- MPS: Vernal--Maeser, Utah MPS
- NRHP reference No.: 04001422
- Added to NRHP: December 29, 2004

The Manfred and Ethel Martin House, at 163 N. Vernal Ave. in Vernal, Utah, was built in 1912. It was listed on the National Register of Historic Places in 2004.

It is a vernacular Shingle Style house.

It was deemed "significant as an early health care facility in Vernal. Manfred Martin was an early doctor in Vernal and built this house in 1912 as a family residence with an attached doctor's office. He moved to Vernal during a period of growth and prosperity in Vernal's history when the demand for more medical facilities increased." He attended patients by horse and buggy.

It was also deemed significant architecturally "as the only example in Vernal of a Shingle style house. The Shingle style is uncommon in Utah, and even more so in such isolated communities as Vernal. Although the house has had some minor alterations, it retains its historic and architectural integrity and contributes to the history of Vernal and Uintah County."
