= Gibson–Sowards House =

- U.S. National Register of Historic Places
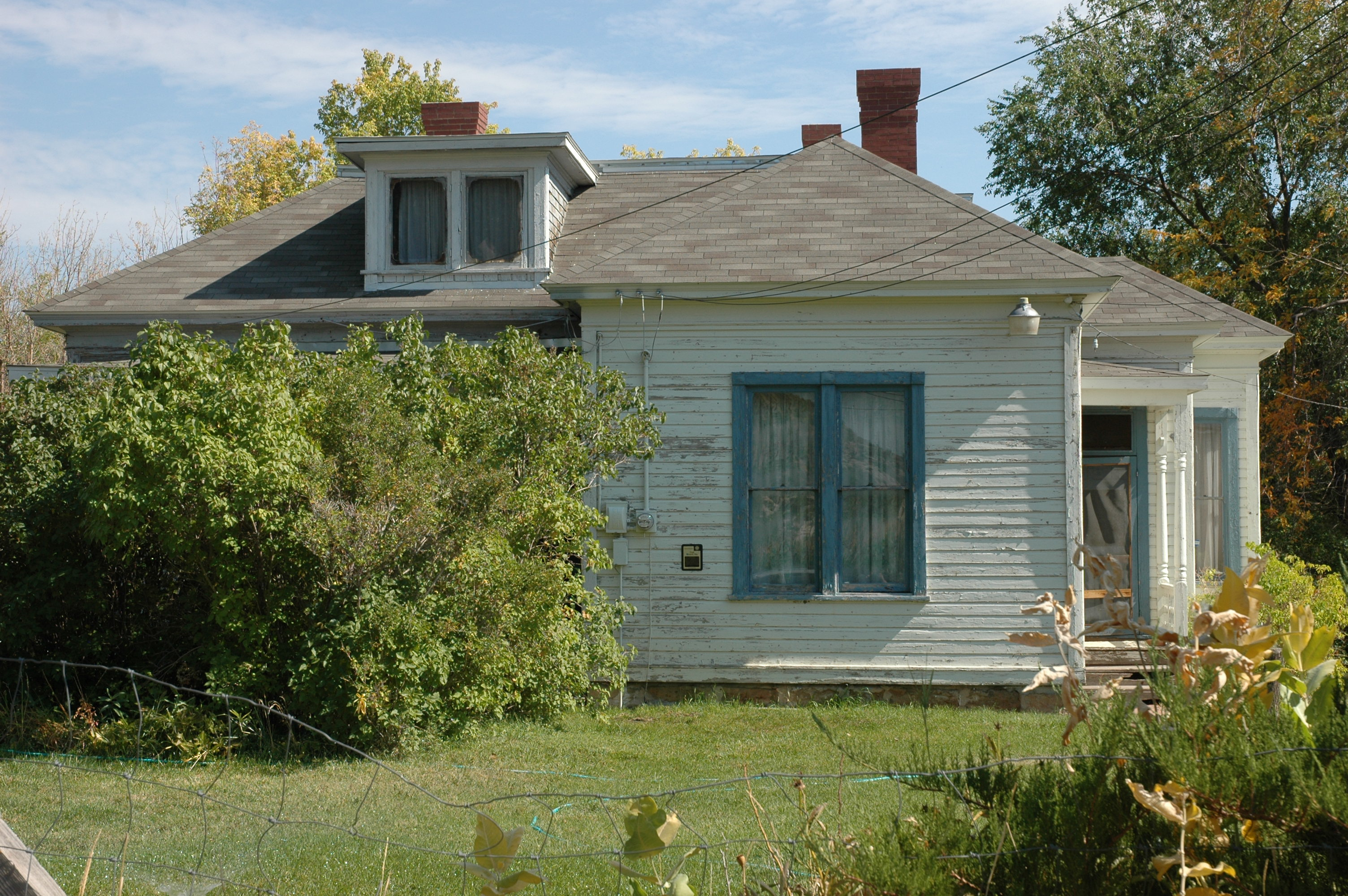

- Location within Utah
- Location: 3110 N 250 W, Vernal, Utah
- Coordinates: 40°30′05″N 109°31′59″W
- Area: 8 acres (3.2 ha)
- Built: 1891
- Architectural style: Late Victorian
- NRHP reference No.: 97001465
- Added to NRHP: November 24, 1997

The Gibson–Sowards House, at 3110 N 250 W in Vernal, Utah, was built in 1891. It was listed on the National Register of Historic Places. The listing included four contributing buildings and four contributing structures.

It is a wood frame one-and-a-half-story house built on a sandstone foundation, with the sandstone taken from a hill just to its north. It is Victorian Eclectic in style, with an irregular plan, an asymmetrical facade, and decorative porches. It includes restrained Queen Anne elements such as lathe-turned columns, decorative brackets, and scroll-cut patterned railings on its west and south porches.

Seven other contributing resources are: a log shed, a round metal granary, ruins of a rock house built around the 1880s, a 1925 garage, a c.1900 hay-derrick, a plank shed, and assorted corral fencing and water and feed troughs.

It is located about 3 kilometres (1.9 mi) north of Vernal in Ashley Valley, a rural area in the Unitah Basin.
