= Francis 'Frank' and Eunice Smith House =

- U.S. National Register of Historic Places
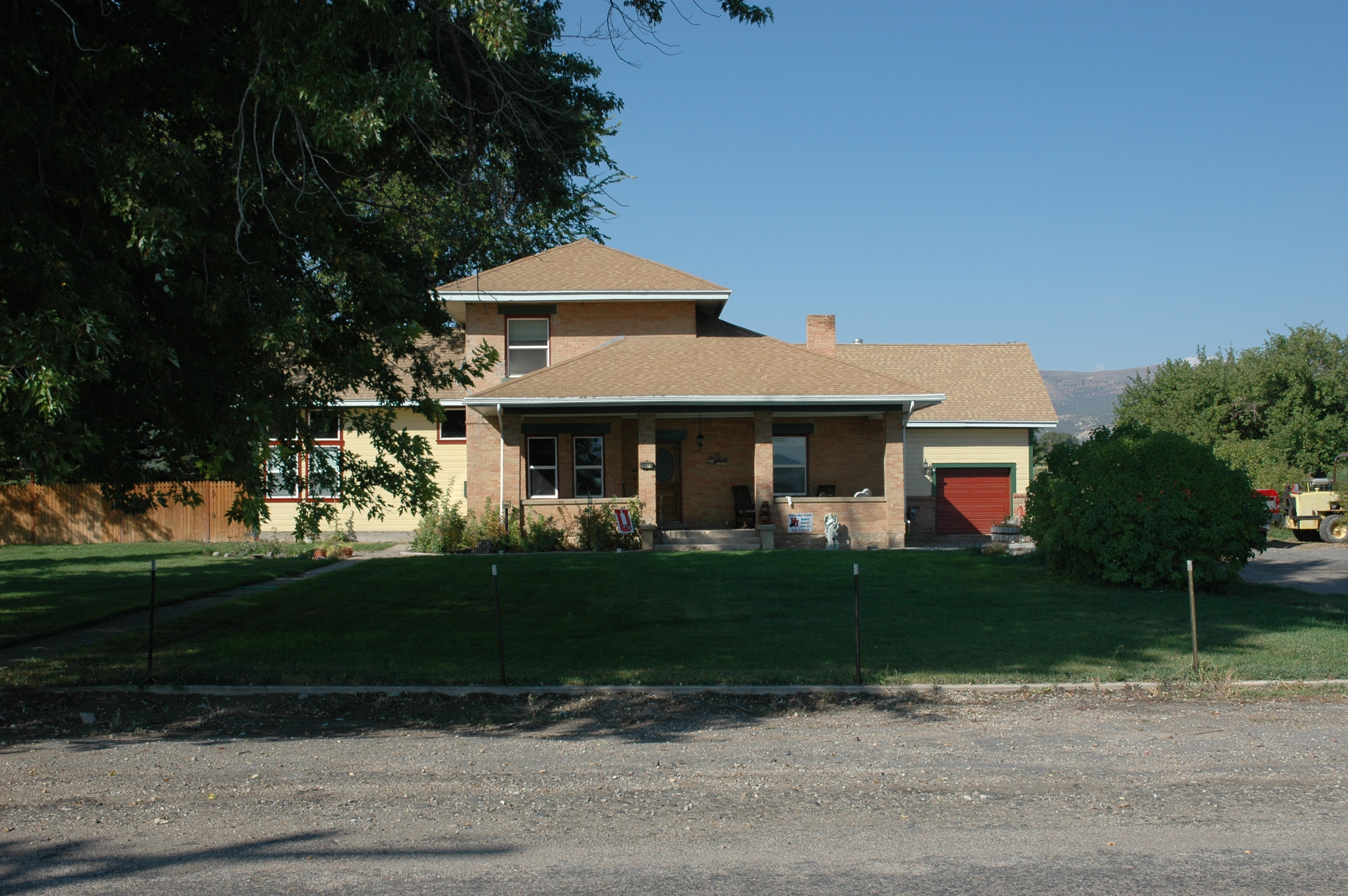

- Location within Utah Location within the United States
- Location: 1847 N 3000 W, Vernal, Utah
- Coordinates: 40°28′24″N 109°35′12″W
- Area: 2.9 acres (1.2 ha)
- Built: 1913-14
- Built by: Smith, Francis
- NRHP reference No.: 01000317
- Added to NRHP: March 29, 2001

The Francis 'Frank' and Eunice Smith House, at 1847 N 3000 W in Vernal, Utah was built in 1913–14. It was listed on the National Register of Historic Places in 2001.

It was deemed significant "for its unique architecture and the craftsmanship of the builder and original owner, Frank Smith. The Smith House is architecturally significant as a good representation of Frank Smith's carpentry and woodworking skills, particularly in the carved wood details and extant wood finish work in the interior. Smith was a local builder and woodworker who assisted in the construction of a large number of buildings in Vernal, Utah, and surrounding communities. His works include more than thirty residences as well as several various civic and religious buildings. The house is one of only two, two-story foursquare-type residences in the area and one of the larger houses in the settled area surrounding the city of Vernal. The foursquare house type is not as common in Utah as in other areas, especially in rural areas such as Vernal, and the Smith House is a unique variation of the type."
