= Paradise Tithing Office =

- U.S. National Register of Historic Places
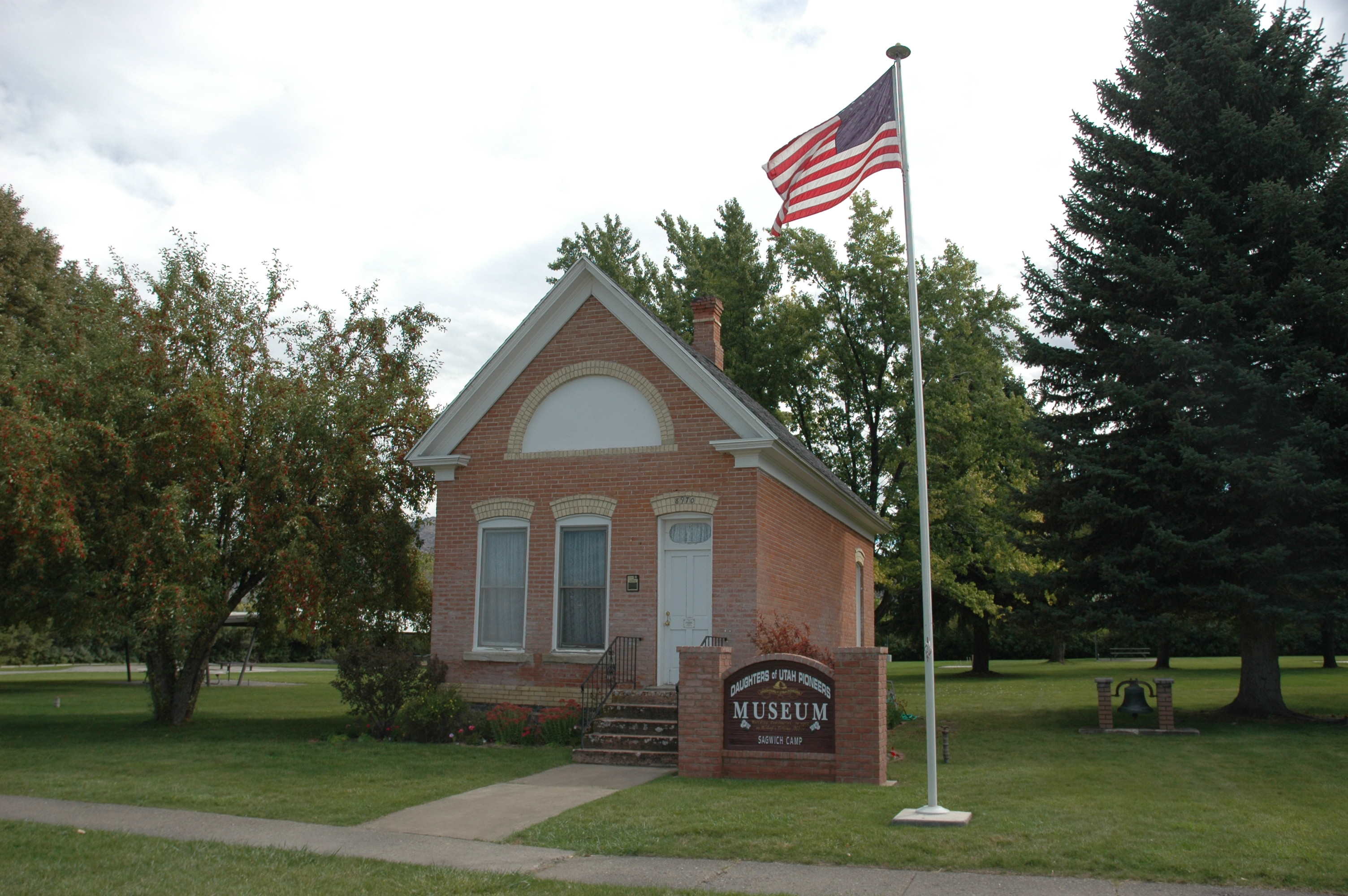
- The building in 2015

- Location within Utah Location within the United States
- Location: 8970 South 200 West, Paradise, Utah
- Coordinates: 41°34′09″N 111°50′14″W
- Area: 1.8 acres (0.73 ha)
- Built: 1876
- Architectural style: Greek Revival
- MPS: Tithing Offices and Granaries of the Mormon Church TR
- NRHP reference No.: 85000253
- Added to NRHP: January 25, 1985

The Paradise Tithing Office is a historic building in Paradise, Utah. It was built in 1876, before Utah became a state, as a tithing building for local members of the Church of Jesus Christ of Latter-day Saints, and it was designed in the Greek Revival architectural style. It has been listed on the National Register of Historic Places since January 25, 1985.
