= Dennis Preece =

American sports coach (1940 – 1997)

Dennis Preece (born Stanley Dennis Preece; March 4, 1940 – April 25, 1997) was born in Vernal, Utah, and moved early in his childhood to Craig, Colorado, where he attended Moffat County High School. In high school, Preece played football and basketball. He attended Brigham Young University for one year before transferring to Colorado State College (now known as the University of Northern Colorado) where he graduated with a teaching degree in mathematics and industrial arts. While at Colorado State College, he met his future wife Mary Ann Schattinger, whom he married on March 21, 1964. They had three children (Brian, Deanna and Scott) together. Preece then took his first teaching job at Uintah High School in the fall of 1964. Besides coaching wrestling and golf, Preece coached football and tennis. His other interests included oil painting, genealogy and quarter horse training.

== Coaching years ==
Preece was a highly successful high school wrestling coach in Utah, USA. Preece won nine wrestling state titles over a 12-year span from 1966 to 1977 at Uintah High School in Vernal, Utah. His teams finished second twice and third once to go along with those nine state titles. Preece also coached Uintah to a golf state title in 1969.

At Uintah High School, Preece coached 47 individual state champions and 101 total state place winners (places 1–4), along with seven All-Americans. He coached the second and third 3-time state champions in Utah wrestling history [John Price (1969, 1970, 1971) and Scott Ruppe (1974, 1975, 1976)], and in 1971 and 1972 he had seven wrestlers win state titles out of the then 12 weight classes with a state record 10 state finalists in 1971. Preece compiled a dual meet record of 208-16-2 while at Uintah High School and his teams won 50 tournaments. He was voted as Utah's Wrestling Coach of the Year by his peers five times and was named the National Wrestling Coach of the Year in 1977 by Wrestling USA Magazine. While at Uintah, Preece started the Vernal or Uintah Tournament of Champions in 1973, which is the longest continuous invitational tournament in Utah. Preece was inducted into the National Wrestling Hall of Fame, the USA Wrestling Utah/Utah Amateur Wrestling Hall of Fame, and the Utah Sports Hall of Fame.

Preece was also on the forefront of developing youth wrestling in Utah. His "Tiger League" wrestling program developed wrestlers that would feed Uintah High School's dynastic run. He also coached high school all-star teams from Utah that competed in international competitions at Mexico City and Montreal. The team he took to Montreal used some of the Olympic facilities prior to the 1976 summer games. Preece also hosted a youth national team from Japan that competed against the top high school wrestlers from Utah.

After Uintah, Preece coached at Cyprus High School and Skyline High School, both in Salt Lake County (Utah). In his last year coaching at Skyline in 1991, Preece coached two state champions including his youngest son Scott, who won the 1991 4A state title at 145 pounds. His other state champion, Jake Marshall at 171 pounds, became Preece's last and eighth All-American as Marshall placed eighth at the National High School Coaches Association (NHSCA) Senior Nationals.

== Legacy ==
Preece's coaching tree includes former wrestlers Joe Wolfe Davis, who won seven state titles coaching wrestling at Monticello High School (Utah), Ed Johnson, who won three state titles coaching at Uintah High School and his son Brian Preece, who was the head coach at Provo High School (Utah) from 1994 to 2006. Both Preeces' have coached All-Americans at the NHSCA Senior Nationals becoming the only father-son duo in Utah wrestling history to do so. Preece's daughter, Deanna Meyer, was the head volleyball coach at Lone Peak High School in Highland, Utah. In a 10-year stretch, Meyer won five state 5A volleyball titles, placed second four times with one other semi-final appearance. In 2015 Meyer left Lone Peak to coach at Skyridge High School in Lehi, Utah, where she won the 2018 5A state title.

== Death ==
Preece suffered a stroke on April 15, 1997, and died 10 days later on April 25, 1997, in Salt Lake County, Utah.
