= Fairview Tithing Office/Bishop's Storehouse =

- U.S. National Register of Historic Places
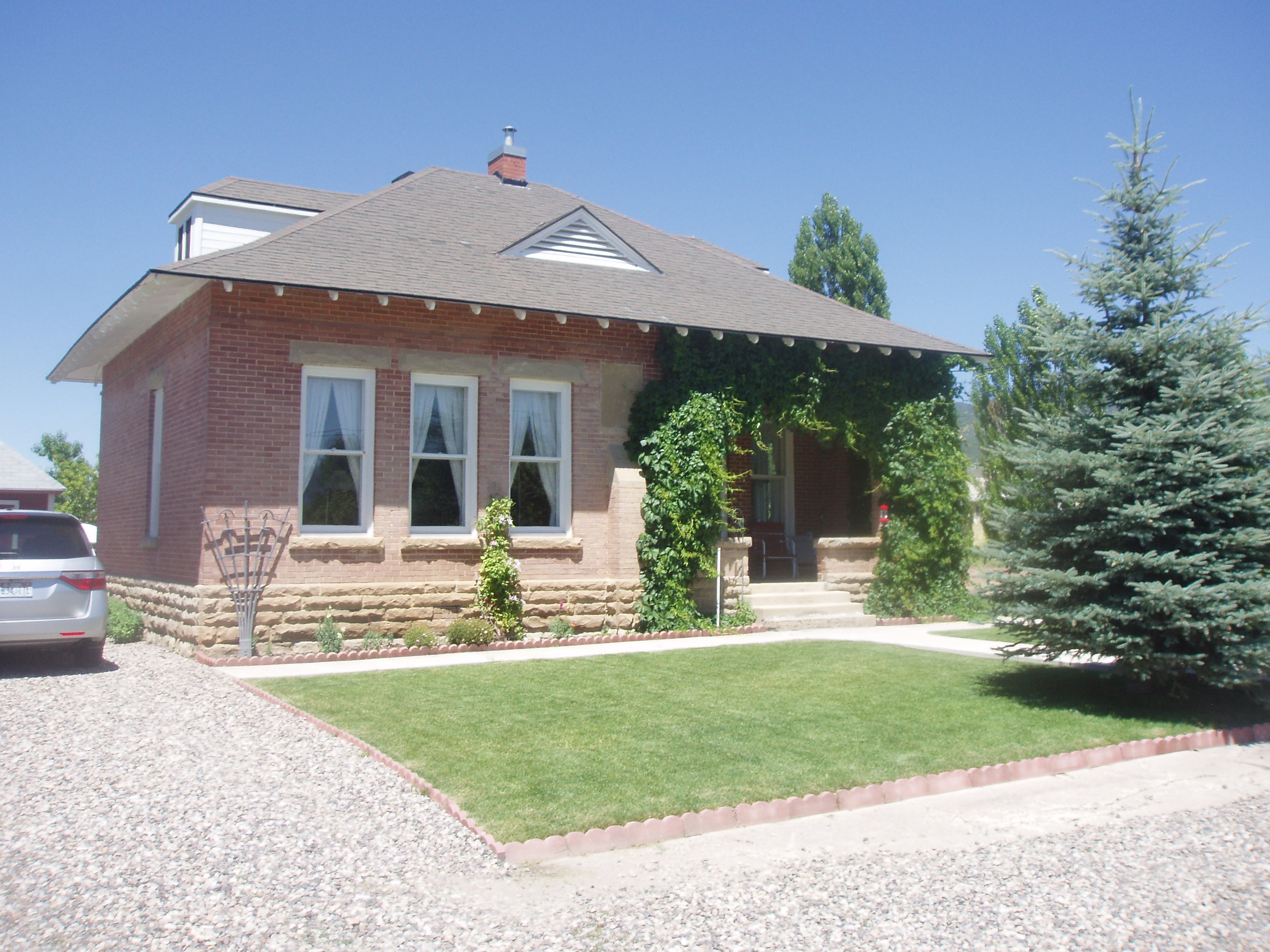
- The building in 2011

- Location within Utah Location within the United States
- Location: 60 West 100 South, Fairview, Utah
- Coordinates: 39°37′36″N 111°26′23″W
- Area: 0.8 acres (0.32 ha)
- Built: 1908
- Architectural style: Victorian Eclectic, Pyramid Cottage
- MPS: Tithing Offices and Granaries of the Mormon Church TR
- NRHP reference No.: 85000281
- Added to NRHP: January 25, 1985

The Fairview Tithing Office/Bishop's Storehouse is a historic building in Fairview, Utah, United States. It was built with red bricks in 1908 as a tithing office and bishop's office for the Church of Jesus Christ of Latter-day Saints. The bishop at the time was James C. Peterson. The building was designed in the Victorian Eclectic architectural style, with a pyramid roof. It was sold to Henry A. Rasmussen, who remodelled it as a private residence, in 1932. It has been listed on the National Register of Historic Places since January 25, 1985.
