= St. Paul's Episcopal Church (Vernal, Utah) =

Historic church in Utah, United States

- St. Paul's Episcopal Church and Lodge
- U.S. National Register of Historic Places
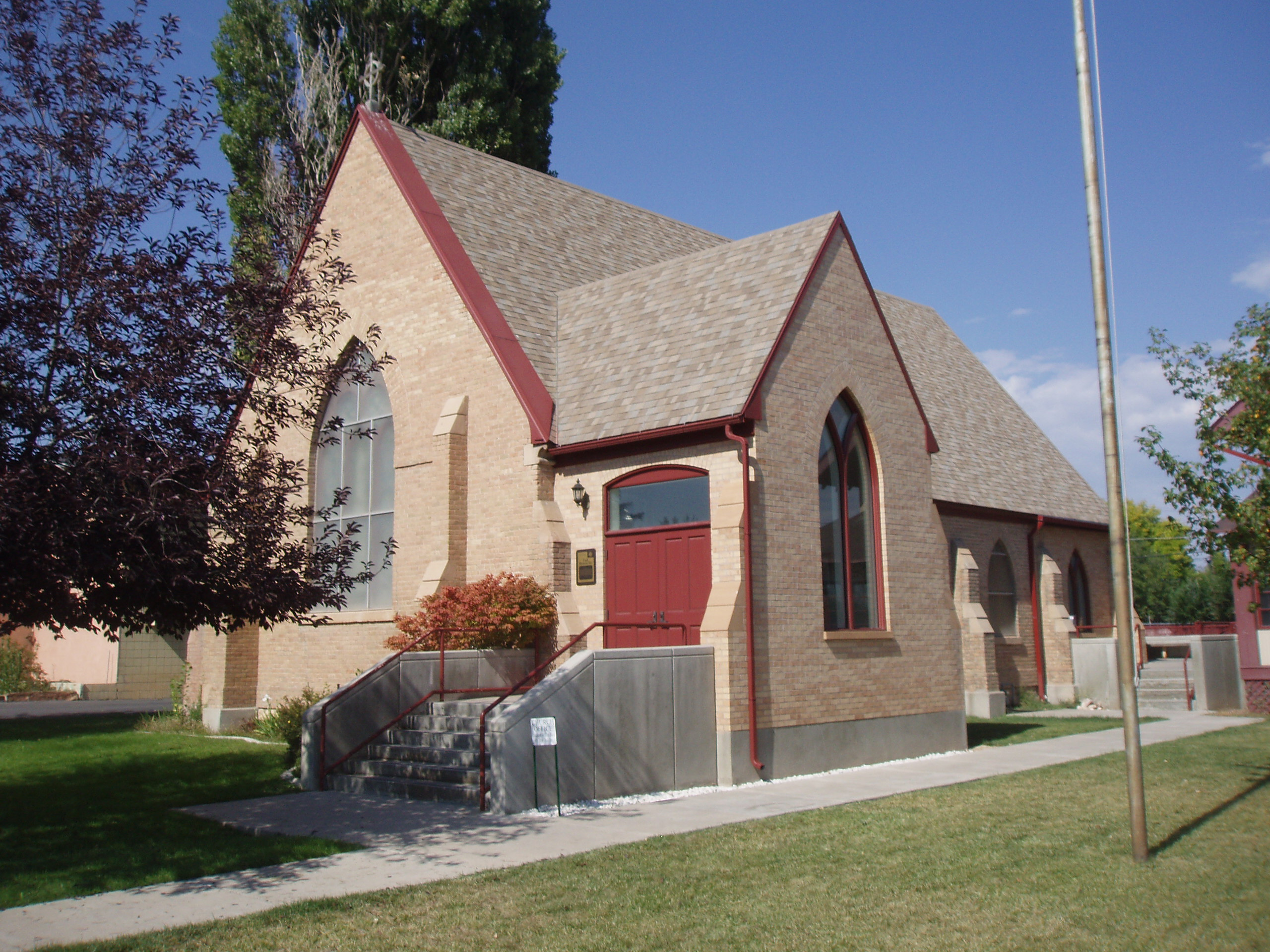

- Location within Utah Location within the United States
- Location: 226 W. Main St., Vernal, Utah
- Coordinates: 40°27′21″N 109°31′57″W
- Area: 0.6 acres (0.24 ha)
- Built: 1901
- Architect: Multiple
- Architectural style: Late Gothic Revival, Other, Craftsman
- NRHP reference No.: 85000049
- Added to NRHP: January 3, 1985

St. Paul's Episcopal Church and Lodge are a pair of historic church buildings at 226 W. Main Street in Vernal, Utah.

Built in 1901, the church is the second-oldest religious structure still standing in the Uintah Basin. St. Paul's Lodge, now the parish house, was built in 1909 by the Girls' Friendly Society as a home for girls visiting Vernal. The church was closed 1928–1947, but has always been the property of the Episcopal Church. The lodge served as Uintah County's major hospital from 1932 until 1949, when the church bought it. The complex was added to the National Register of Historic Places in 1985.
