= Lakeview Tithing Office =

- U.S. National Register of Historic Places
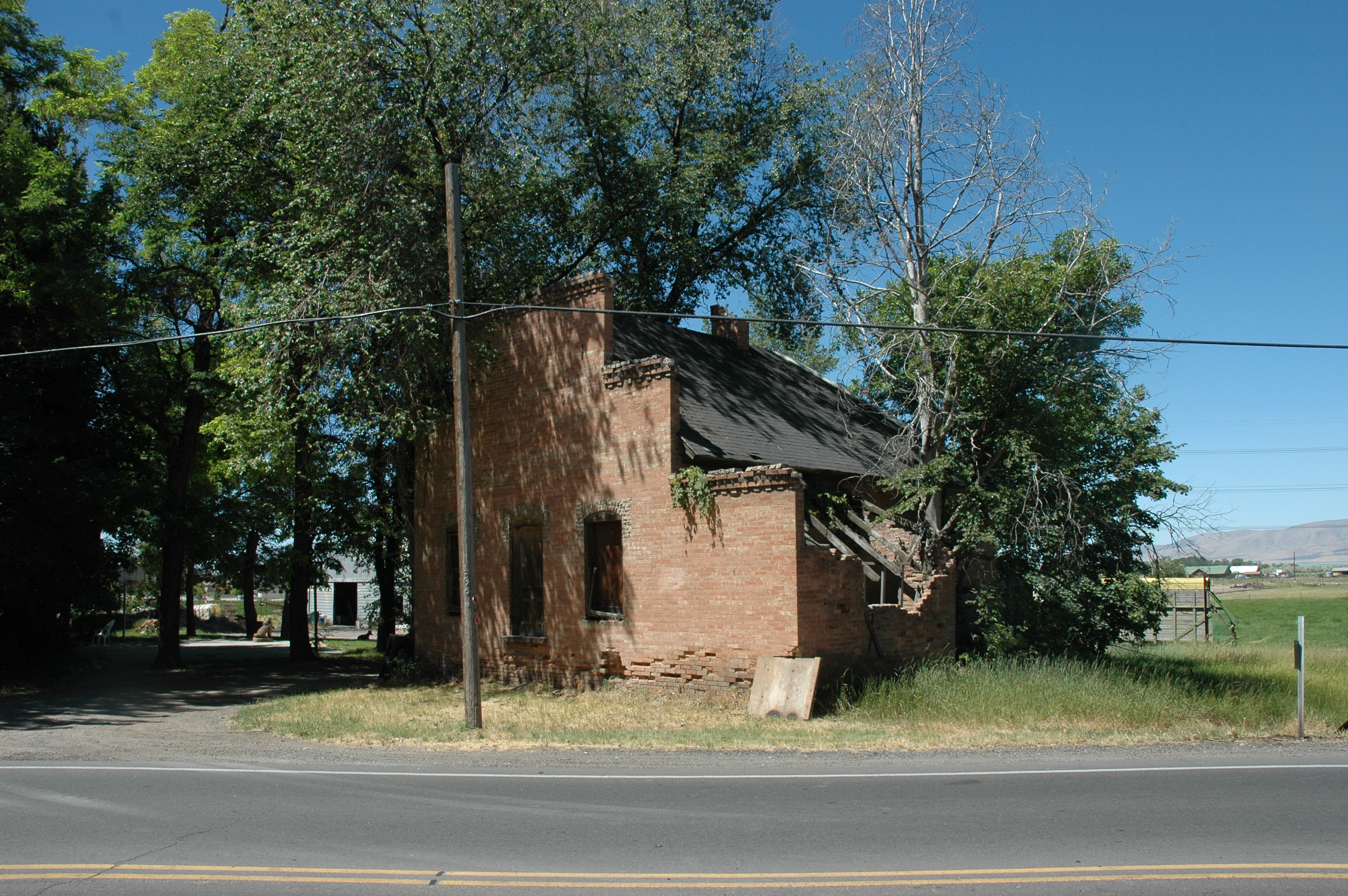
- Lakeview Tithing Office

- Location within Utah Location within the United States
- Location: 1675 North Geneva Road (SR-114); Provo, Utah
- Coordinates: 40°15′21″N 111°42′35″W
- Area: 1 acre (0.40 ha)
- Built: 1899
- Built by: Bunnell, Leslie L.
- MPS: Tithing Offices and Granaries of the Mormon Church TR
- NRHP reference No.: 85000289
- Added to NRHP: January 25, 1985

The Lakeview Tithing Office, also known as the Bunnell Creamery, is a historic building located in Provo, Utah, United States. It is listed on the National Register of Historic Places.

== Description ==
The Lakeview Tithing Office was constructed in 1899. Originally serving as a creamery, it eventually became a hub for members of the Church of Jesus Christ of Latter-day Saints (LDS Church), and an important symbol of their faith.

This structure is only one story high, and is made of brick. It has a roof that is a mix between a gable roof and a hip roof, and possesses a stone foundation and a false front. The detailing of the home includes corbelling of the upper edge, rock-faced shoulder arches, and jigsaw cut elements in the wooden arches. There have been no major changes to the building, and it remains in good condition.

The Lakeview Tithing office is one of twenty eight tithing offices in Utah for the LDS Church, which buildings functioned between 1850 and 1910. These facilities served for church members to be able to collect, store, and distribute the farm products donated as tithing, for at the time, agricultural products comprised most of what people worked for and earned. Serving as a node for economic activity and welfare, the Lakeview tithing office was a vital building for many of the city's early inhabitantsy who belonged to the LDS church.

== History ==
Built in 1899 by Leslie L. Bunnell, the Lakeview Tithing office, operated as a creamery for several years before being a tithing office. The first creamery in Lakeview, this building was involved in the producing and selling of cheese and butter, and the selling of milk. The Bunnell family, consisting of five children, lived inside the creamery in the room located on the west end. In 1904, an adjoining house was built, and the family relocated. Subsequently, the Bunnells sold the creamery to the Lakeview ward of the LDS church, who deemed to use it as a tithing office. The Bunnell family re-purchased the building back in approximately 1920 for use as a granary and occasionally to rent the west room out.

It was listed on the National Register of Historic Places in 1985.

== Additional sources ==
- 2002. "Historic Provo" Provo City Landmarks Commission.
