= Sandy Tithing Office =

- U.S. National Register of Historic Places
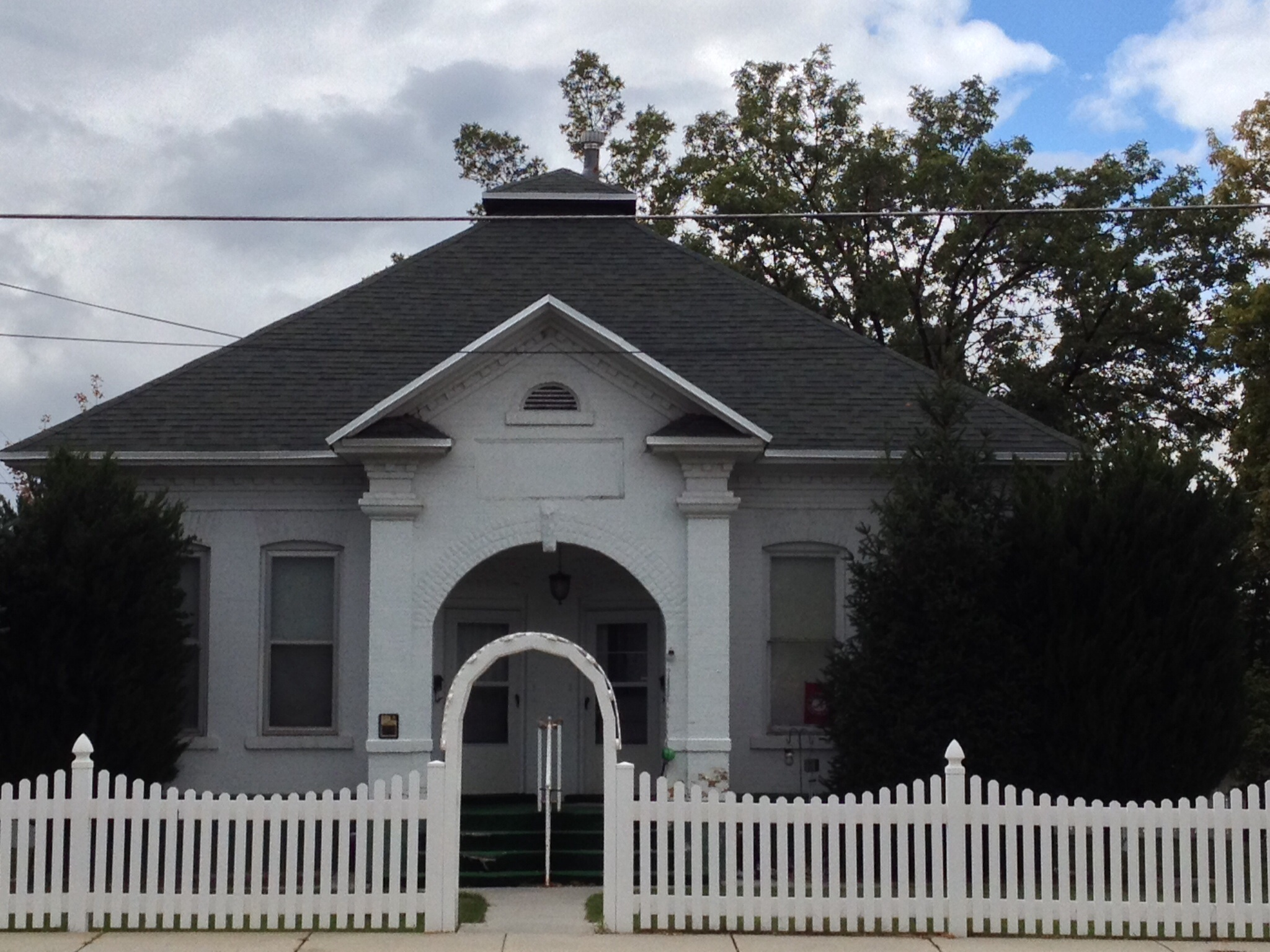
- The building in 2013

- Location within Utah Location within the United States
- Location: 326 South 280 East, Sandy, Utah
- Coordinates: 40°35′27″N 111°52′53″W
- Area: 0.2 acres (0.081 ha)
- Built: 1906
- Architectural style: Late Victorian, Eclectic;Pyramid Cottage
- MPS: Tithing Offices and Granaries of the Mormon Church TR
- NRHP reference No.: 85000279
- Added to NRHP: January 25, 1985

The Sandy Tithing Office is a historic building in Sandy, Utah. It was built in 1906-1907 as a tithing building for the Church of Jesus Christ of Latter-day Saints. Iy was designed in the Victorian Eclectic style, with a pyramid roof and a gabled pavilion. The bishop of the Sandy ward at the time was William D. Kuhre. The builder and architect are not known. The building has been listed on the National Register of Historic Places since January 25, 1985.
