= Carter Road (Utah) =

- U.S. National Register of Historic Places
- Location within Utah Location within the United States
- Location: Ashley National Forest, Uintah and Daggett counties, Utah
- Coordinates: 40°43′11″N 109°43′10″W
- Area: 72 acres (29 ha)
- Built: 1881
- Built by: U.S. Army
- NRHP reference No.: 00000354
- Added to NRHP: May 21, 2001

The Carter Road, also known as the Carter Trail or the Carter Military Road, in Utah and Wyoming, was built in 1881 by the U.S. Army. A portion of the trail in Ashley National Forest, running through Uintah County and Daggett County, Utah, was listed on the National Register of Historic Places in 2001.

The listing included three contributing sites and a contributing structure on 72 acres (29 ha).

- Other names: Carter Trail; 42UN823 and 42DA208
- Historic function: Transportation; Defense; Domestic
- Historic subfunction: Road-related; Military Facility; Camp
- Criteria: event, information potential
