= Vernal, Utah =

City in Utah, United States

- City
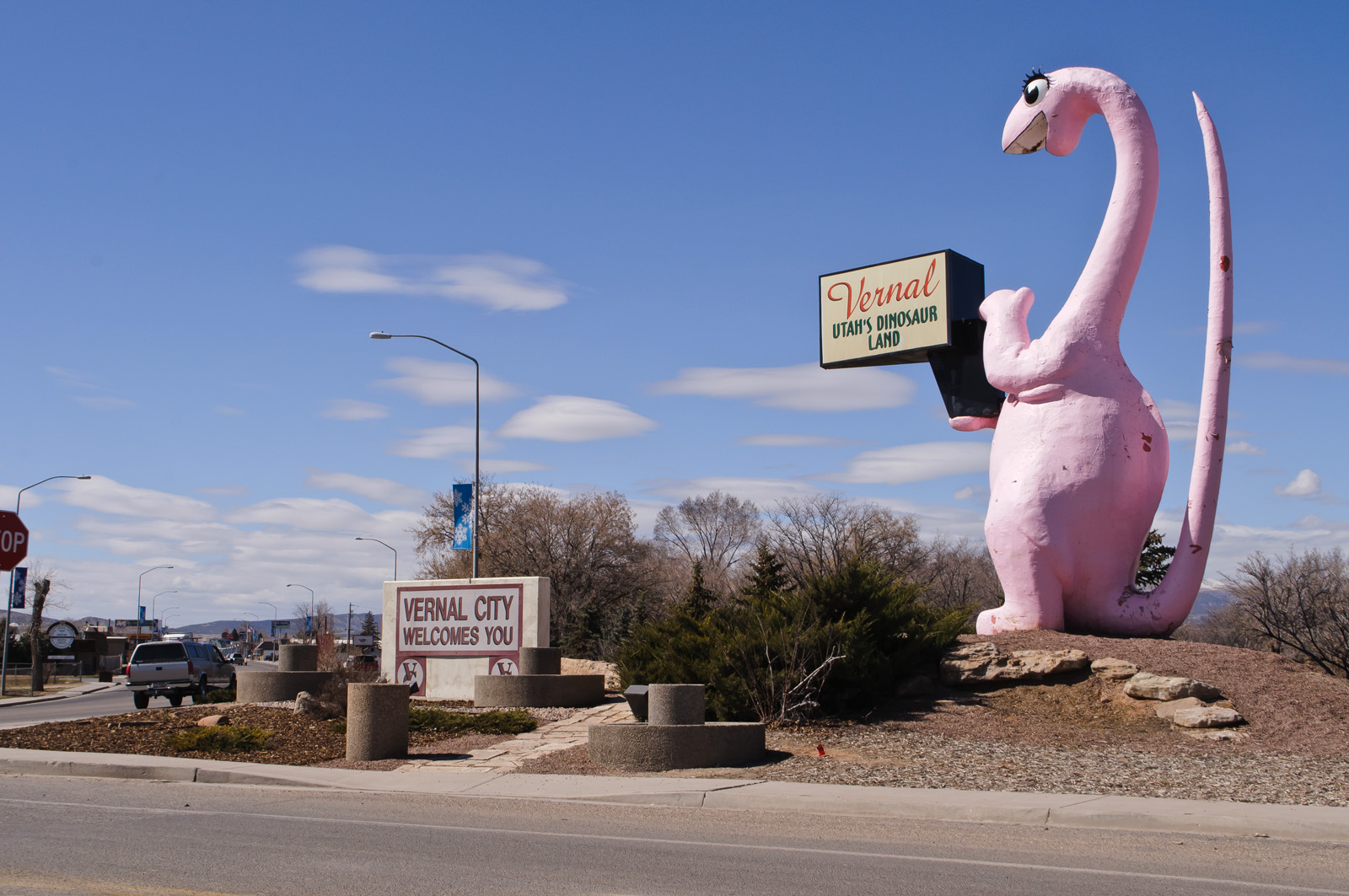
- East entrance of Vernal (2012)

- Seal
- Motto: Timeless wonders. Endless adventure.
- Location within Uintah County and Utah
- Coordinates: 40°27′03″N 109°31′22″W
- Country: United States
- State: Utah
- County: Uintah
- Settled: 1876
- Named for: Vernal

Area
  - Total: 4.62 sq mi (11.97 km^{2})
  - Land: 4.62 sq mi (11.97 km^{2})
  - Water: 0 sq mi (0.00 km^{2})
- Elevation: 5,358 ft (1,633 m)

Population (2020)
  - Total: 10,079
  - Estimate (2022): 10,432
  - Density: 2,258.3/sq mi (871.95/km^{2})
- Time zone: UTC−7 (Mountain (MST))
  - Summer (DST): UTC−6 (MDT)
- ZIP codes: 84078-84079
- Area code: 435
- FIPS code: 49-80090
- GNIS feature ID: 2412149
- Website: www.vernal.gov

Vernal is the county seat of and the largest city in Uintah County, Utah, approximately 175 miles (280 km) east of Salt Lake City and 20 miles (32 km) west of the Colorado border. As of the 2020 census, the city population was 10,079. The population has since grown to 10,432 as of the 2022 population estimate.

Vernal is home to the Vernal Temple of The Church of Jesus Christ of Latter-day Saints and one of the nine statewide regional campuses of Utah State University. The city serves as a gateway to the nearby Dinosaur National Monument, Flaming Gorge, and the Uinta Mountain Range.

== History ==
Vernal, unlike most Utah towns, was not settled by Mormons moving west, or across the state. Brigham Young sent a scouting party to the area Uintah Basin in 1861 and received word back that the area was good for nothing but nomad purposes, hunting grounds for Indians, and "to hold the world together." That same year, President Abraham Lincoln set the area aside as the Uintah Indian Reservation, with Captain Pardon Dodds appointed as Indian agent. Dodds later built one of the first cabins erected by a white men in the Uintah Basin around 1868, although earlier trappers like Jim Reed, Antoine Robidoux and Kit Carson established smaller, non-permanent trading posts at strategic locations around the basin. Settlers began to filter in after that and built cabins in various spots on or near Ashley Creek. In 1879, many came close to perishing during the infamous "Hard Winter" of that same year.

== Geography ==
Vernal is in the Uintah Basin, bordered on the north by the Uinta Mountains, one of the relatively few mountain ranges which lie in an east–west rather than the usual north-to-south direction. The Tavaputs Plateau lies to the south and Blue Mountain to the east, while Vernal itself lies in Ashley Valley. The valley is named in honor of William H. Ashley, an early fur trader who entered the area in 1825 by floating down the Green River in a bull boat made of animal hides.

Vernal is located on the northern edge of the Colorado Plateau and south of Flaming Gorge National Recreation Area on the Utah-Wyoming state line. The city is in a high desert area of the Colorado Plateau.

According to the United States Census Bureau, the city has a total area of 4.6 square miles (11.9 km^{2}), all land.

=== Climate ===
Vernal has a cool semi-arid climate (Köppen: BSk) with low humidity. The average annual temperature is 46.9 °F (8.3 °C) with a mean high of 59.8 °F (15.4 °C) and a mean low of 34.0 °F (1.1 °C).

Climate data for Vernal, Utah, 1991–2020 normals, extremes 1894–present
Month	Jan	Feb	Mar	Apr	May	Jun	Jul	Aug	Sep	Oct	Nov	Dec	Year
Record high °F (°C)	57 (14)	65 (18)	85 (29)	91 (33)	101 (38)	106 (41)	104 (40)	102 (39)	98 (37)	89 (32)	72 (22)	65 (18)	106 (41)
Mean maximum °F (°C)	42.8 (6.0)	51.5 (10.8)	67.5 (19.7)	77.0 (25.0)	84.6 (29.2)	93.6 (34.2)	96.5 (35.8)	94.3 (34.6)	88.9 (31.6)	76.6 (24.8)	60.1 (15.6)	45.7 (7.6)	97.3 (36.3)
Mean daily maximum °F (°C)	29.2 (−1.6)	37.1 (2.8)	51.1 (10.6)	59.9 (15.5)	70.2 (21.2)	81.4 (27.4)	88.7 (31.5)	86.0 (30.0)	76.3 (24.6)	61.2 (16.2)	45.7 (7.6)	31.3 (−0.4)	59.8 (15.4)
Daily mean °F (°C)	19.6 (−6.9)	26.8 (−2.9)	38.8 (3.8)	46.7 (8.2)	56.4 (13.6)	66.0 (18.9)	72.7 (22.6)	70.5 (21.4)	61.2 (16.2)	48.0 (8.9)	34.6 (1.4)	22.0 (−5.6)	46.9 (8.3)
Mean daily minimum °F (°C)	10.0 (−12.2)	16.5 (−8.6)	26.5 (−3.1)	33.5 (0.8)	42.6 (5.9)	50.5 (10.3)	56.7 (13.7)	55.1 (12.8)	46.1 (7.8)	34.8 (1.6)	23.5 (−4.7)	12.7 (−10.7)	34.0 (1.1)
Mean minimum °F (°C)	−4.7 (−20.4)	0.7 (−17.4)	13.6 (−10.2)	20.2 (−6.6)	29.6 (−1.3)	37.0 (2.8)	47.4 (8.6)	45.3 (7.4)	33.4 (0.8)	20.5 (−6.4)	8.8 (−12.9)	−2.3 (−19.1)	−7.8 (−22.1)
Record low °F (°C)	−38 (−39)	−38 (−39)	−18 (−28)	0 (−18)	12 (−11)	24 (−4)	25 (−4)	32 (0)	19 (−7)	2 (−17)	−13 (−25)	−32 (−36)	−38 (−39)
Average precipitation inches (mm)	0.62 (16)	0.56 (14)	0.68 (17)	0.75 (19)	1.04 (26)	0.59 (15)	0.54 (14)	0.81 (21)	1.22 (31)	1.15 (29)	0.51 (13)	0.61 (15)	9.08 (230)
Average snowfall inches (cm)	5.8 (15)	3.9 (9.9)	1.6 (4.1)	0.6 (1.5)	0.0 (0.0)	0.0 (0.0)	0.0 (0.0)	0.0 (0.0)	0.0 (0.0)	0.5 (1.3)	1.6 (4.1)	6.4 (16)	20.4 (51.9)
Average precipitation days (≥ 0.01 in)	5.3	5.3	4.6	5.6	7.0	4.2	4.2	5.2	5.8	5.4	4.3	5.0	61.9
Average snowy days (≥ 0.1 in)	3.9	3.5	1.3	0.4	0.1	0.0	0.0	0.0	0.0	0.4	1.2	3.7	14.5
Source 1: NOAA
Source 2: National Weather Service

== Demographics ==
Historical population
Census	Pop.	Note	%±
1880	799		—
1890	1,305		63.3%
1900	664		−49.1%
1910	836		25.9%
1920	1,309		56.6%
1930	1,744		33.2%
1940	2,119		21.5%
1950	2,845		34.3%
1960	3,655		28.5%
1970	3,908		6.9%
1980	6,600		68.9%
1990	6,644		0.7%
2000	7,714		16.1%
2010	9,089		17.8%
2020	10,079		10.9%
U.S. Decennial Census

=== 2020 census ===
As of the 2020 census, Vernal had a population of 10,079. The median age was 29.8 years. 31.0% of residents were under the age of 18 and 11.2% of residents were 65 years of age or older. For every 100 females there were 96.1 males, and for every 100 females age 18 and over there were 90.3 males age 18 and over.

99.9% of residents lived in urban areas, while 0.1% lived in rural areas.

There were 3,796 households in Vernal, of which 39.3% had children under the age of 18 living in them. Of all households, 44.0% were married-couple households, 18.6% were households with a male householder and no spouse or partner present, and 29.5% were households with a female householder and no spouse or partner present. About 28.8% of all households were made up of individuals and 9.5% had someone living alone who was 65 years of age or older.

There were 4,461 housing units, of which 14.9% were vacant. The homeowner vacancy rate was 3.9% and the rental vacancy rate was 16.9%.

Racial composition as of the 2020 census
Race	Number	Percent
White	8,383	83.2%
Black or African American	47	0.5%
American Indian and Alaska Native	371	3.7%
Asian	80	0.8%
Native Hawaiian and Other Pacific Islander	49	0.5%
Some other race	395	3.9%
Two or more races	754	7.5%
Hispanic or Latino (of any race)	1,122	11.1%

== Economy ==
Vernal's economy is based on extracting natural resources, including petroleum, natural gas, phosphate, and uintaite (more commonly known as gilsonite). This has led to the establishment of branch offices of companies such as Halliburton and Schlumberger.

Tourism also plays a role in Vernal's economy due to the town's roots in the Old West and being a large site of ancient dinosaur fossils. Vernal and the surrounding area are popular among outdoor enthusiasts as they are situated near plentiful spots for fishing, fly fishing, hunting, and other outdoor activities.

== Education ==
Vernal's public schools include Ashley Valley Education Center, Uintah High, Uintah Middle School, Vernal Middle, Ashley Elementary, Discovery Elementary, and branches of Utah State University and Uintah Basin Technical College. In 2015, the Terra Academy opened as a K–12 charter school. Private schools include White House Academy and Uintah Basin Christian Academy. In 2007, Uintah School District built new buildings for two elementary schools, Maeser and Naples Elementary, in the nearby communities to accommodate increased enrollment and eliminate unsafe older buildings. Other area schools include Davis Elementary, Lapoint Elementary, and Eagle View Elementary (pre-K–8). The National Outdoor Leadership School (NOLS) Rocky Mountain River Base.

== Media ==
The Vernal Express is the newspaper of the city. It was first published in 1891 as the Uintah Papoose.

== Transportation ==
=== Highways ===
Vernal is along an east–west federal highway, U.S. Route 40, and a north–south federal highway, U.S. Route 191. (The two highways overlay each other heading west from the city.)

=== Airport ===
The city's Vernal Regional Airport has scheduled nonstop air service to Phoenix (PHX) operated by Contour Airlines with Embraer ERJ jet aircraft. Passenger service is subsidized by the Essential Air Service (EAS) program. Twice weekly service is also offered To Salt Lake City via Redtail Air.

=== Public transportation ===
Vernal is served by two out of the three Basin Transit Association routes, the Vernal - Roosevelt route (connection available to the Duchesne route in Roosevelt), and the Vernal Circulator, as well as a Salt Lake Express route to Salt Lake City

== Attractions ==
=== Special events ===
The Dinosaur Roundup Rodeo is an annual PRCA rodeo held in Vernal during the second weekend of July. It has been running since the 1930s. This event has been nominated as one of the top five large outdoor rodeos of the year multiple times, and attracts over 500 contestants each year.

Dinah "Soar" Days & Hot Air Balloon Festival features a growing multi-day hot air balloon festival along with numerous other community events, many of which have a hot air balloon theme.

The John Wesley Powell River Festival celebrates the exploration and history of the region with live music, food trucks and activities that focus on local history.

Games, Anime, and More (G.A.M.) is a biannual fan convention. It is a multi-genre convention having video games, card games, cartoons, costumes, tournaments, tabletop gaming, and similar activities. The G.A.M. Convention is held during March and August in Uintah County, Utah. In 2015 it was the first anime convention held in Vernal as well as the first gaming convention held there, making it the first convention of its type in Vernal. In 2016 it was held in Naples, Utah, for the first time, making G.A.M. the first convention of its type in the city of Naples.

The Uintah County Fair occurs Thursday through Saturday each year in the second week of June.

PhenomeCon, a gathering of paranormal enthusiasts, is held in Vernal every year due to its proximity to Skinwalker Ranch.

=== Point of interest ===
Lookout Point rests on the western edge overlooking Ashley Valley, the valley in which Vernal is situated.

== Notable buildings ==
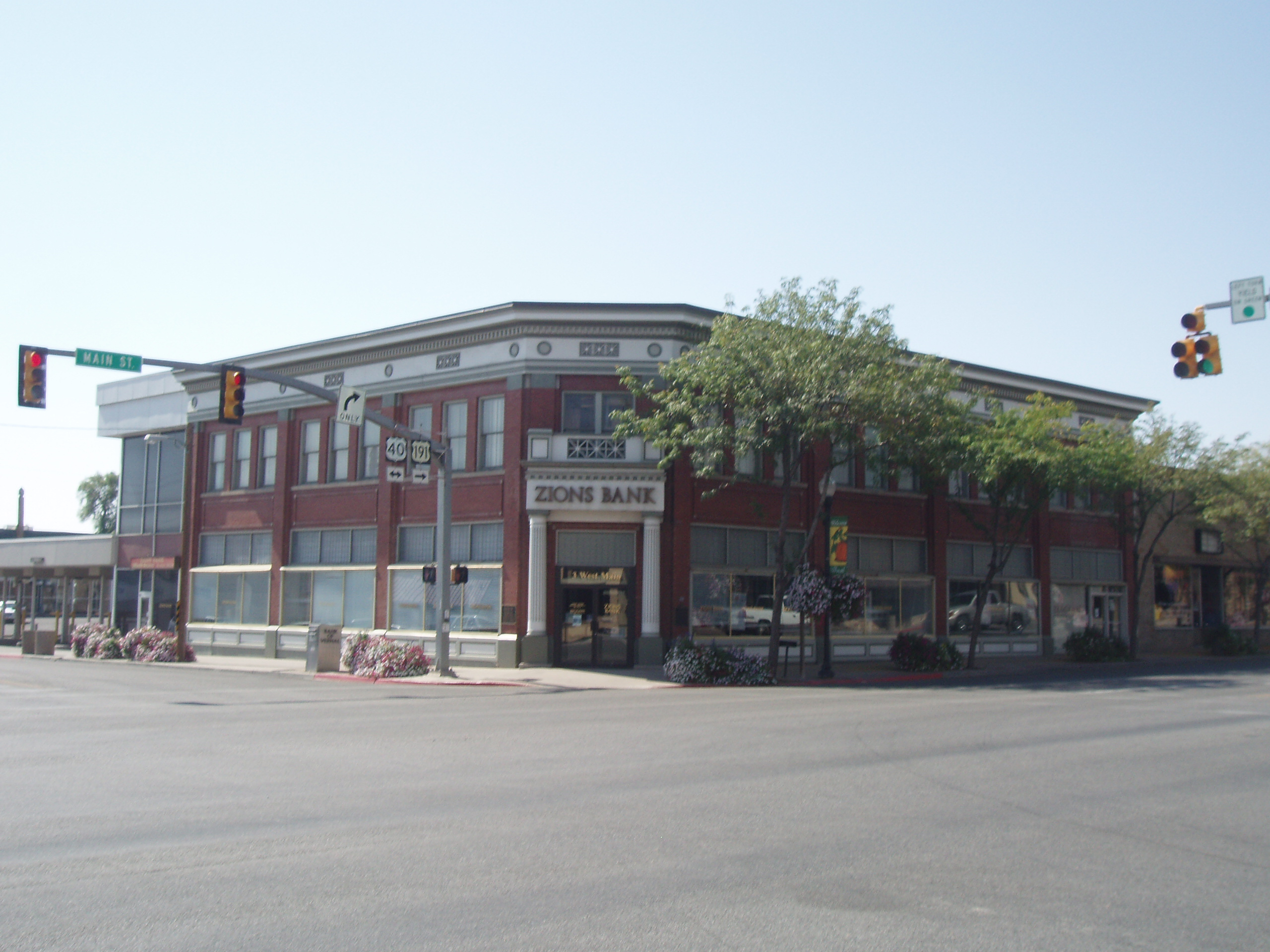
Bank of Vernal (2010)

The Bank of Vernal (a.k.a. the 'Parcel Post' Bank) Building (3 West Main Street) is a registered historical building in the Uintah County Landmark Register. Also known as "the Bank that was sent by Mail", the Bank of Vernal was constructed in 1916–1917 by William H. Coltharp, a Vernal businessman and entrepreneur. Coltharp took advantage of inexpensive Parcel Post rates to ship some 80,000 masonry bricks in fifty-pound (22.6 kg) packages via the U.S. Post Office the 180 miles (290 km) from Salt Lake City to Vernal. The Parcel Post brick shipments were transported from Salt Lake to Mack, Colorado by Denver & Rio Grande Railroad, then proceeded to Watson via the narrow gauge Uintah Railway, finally Vernal by wagon freight through steep roads. The full trip was over 420 miles (675.9 km) long. After completing delivery of the bricks, the U.S. Post Office hastily changed its regulations, establishing a limit of 200 pounds (91 kg) per day per sender. The United States Postmaster General Albert Sidney Burleson explicitly stated in a letter that "it is not the intent of the United States Postal Service that buildings be shipped through the mail". Today the building is used as a branch office of Zions Bank.

The Quarry Visitor Center in Dinosaur National Monument, and the Vernal Utah Temple are other historic Vernal buildings. The Vernal Temple is a small LDS temple in the old Vernal Tabernacle. It was built as the result of a local movement to save the old tabernacle when it was scheduled for demolition.

== Notable people ==
- Ron Abegglen, former Weber State men's basketball coach, born and raised in Vernal
- Earl W. Bascom, inventor; rodeo cowboy, artist and sculptor.
- Texas Rose Bascom (1922–1993), rodeo performer, Hollywood actor, National Cowgirl Hall of Fame inductee
- Clair Burgener, U.S. Representative from California (1973–1983)
- Lane Frost, rodeo star, PRCA Bull Riding Champion of the World, attended junior high school in Vernal
- E. Gordon Gee, academic who held more university presidencies than any other American
- Douglas Kent Hall; writer and photographer; Academy Award winner
- Dallin H. Oaks, president of Brigham Young University, Utah Supreme Court Justice
- Dennis Preece, Hall of Fame wrestling coach at local high school in Vernal
- James Woods, film and television actor, was born in Vernal

== See also ==
- Dinosaur National Monument
- Flaming Gorge National Recreation Area
- Flaming Gorge Dam
- Book Cliffs
