= National Register of Historic Places listings in Jerome County, Idaho =

Location of Jerome County in Idaho

This is a list of the National Register of Historic Places listings in Jerome County, Idaho.

This is intended to be a complete list of the properties on the National Register of Historic Places in Jerome County, Idaho, United States. Latitude and longitude coordinates are provided for many National Register properties and districts; these locations may be seen together in a map.

There are 66 properties listed on the National Register in the county. More can be added; properties and districts nationwide are added to the Register weekly.

This National Park Service list is complete through NPS recent listings posted November 21, 2025.

== Current listings ==
	Name on the Register	Image	Date listed	Location	City or town	Description
1	Allton Building		September 8, 1983 (#83002299)	160 E. Main St. 42°43′28″N 114°30′58″W	Jerome	
2	Tom Barnes Barn		September 8, 1983 (#83002317)	East of Jerome; 42°39′53″N 114°17′46″W	Jerome	
3	Bethune-Ayres House		September 8, 1983 (#83002318)	East of Jerome; 42°41′00″N 114°21′50″W	Jerome	
4	Carl Blessing Outbuildings		September 8, 1983 (#83002319)	Northwest of Jerome; 42°45′11″N 114°35′26″W	Jerome	
5	James Bothwell Water Tank House	James Bothwell Water Tank House	September 8, 1983 (#83002320)	North of Jerome; 42°46′06″N 114°31′00″W	Jerome	
6	Charles Bower House		September 8, 1983 (#83002321)	North of Jerome; 42°48′58″N 114°32′14″W	Jerome	
7	Frank J. Brick House	Frank J. Brick House	September 8, 1983 (#83002322)	300 N. Fillmore St. 42°43′35″N 114°30′28″W	Jerome	
8	Caldron Linn	Caldron Linn	June 27, 1972 (#72000442)	2 miles east of Murtaugh and 6 Miles south of Hazelton, Idaho; 42°29′53″N 114°09′46″W	Murtaugh and Hazelton	Extends into Twin Falls County
9	Dick Callen House	Dick Callen House	September 8, 1983 (#83002323)	South of Jerome; 42°40′36″N 114°31′02″W	Jerome	
10	Canyonside School	Canyonside School	October 14, 1983 (#83003579)	South of Jerome; 42°40′00″N 114°31′05″W	Jerome	
11	William H. Cook Water Tank House	William H. Cook Water Tank House	September 8, 1983 (#83004211)	Southeast of Jerome; 42°40′00″N 114°24′25″W	Jerome	
12	E. V. Cooke House		September 8, 1983 (#83002324)	Northeast of Jerome; 42°45′19″N 114°28′16″W	Jerome	
13	O. J. Daniels House	O. J. Daniels House	September 8, 1983 (#83002325)	South of Jerome; 42°39′16″N 114°31′04″W	Jerome	
14	George V. Doughty House and Garage	George V. Doughty House and Garage	September 15, 1983 (#83002326)	Northeast of Jerome; 42°46′58″N 114°28′40″W	Jerome	The house has been demolished, but the garage is still standing.
15	George Epperson House	George Epperson House	September 8, 1983 (#83002354)	Southeast of Jerome; 42°40′12″N 114°27′47″W	Jerome	
16	G. H. Erdman House		September 8, 1983 (#83002353)	West of Jerome; 42°43′31″N 114°36′06″W	Jerome	
17	Falls City School House	Falls City School House	September 8, 1983 (#83002352)	Southeast of Jerome; 42°40′51″N 114°25′24″W	Jerome	
18	Merritt Fry Farm	Merritt Fry Farm	September 8, 1983 (#83002351)	West of Jerome; 42°41′58″N 114°36′51″W	Jerome	
19	E. C. Gleason House	E. C. Gleason House	September 8, 1983 (#83002350)	209 E. Ave. A 42°43′22″N 114°30′54″W	Jerome	
20	Hugh and Susie Goff House		September 8, 1983 (#83002349)	Northeast of Jerome; 42°48′42″N 114°28′19″W	Jerome	
21	Lulu Graves Farm		September 8, 1983 (#83002348)	Northwest of Jerome; 42°45′34″N 114°32′15″W	Jerome	
22	Greenwood School	Greenwood School	July 27, 2020 (#100005364)	2398 East 990 South; 42°34′35″N 114°03′00″W	Hazelton	
23	Edward M. Gregg Farm		September 8, 1983 (#83002347)	Southeast of Jerome; 42°40′49″N 114°30′02″W	Jerome	
24	Bert and Fay Havens House		September 8, 1983 (#83002346)	North of Hazelton; 42°36′18″N 114°07′58″W	Hazelton	
25	Hazelton Presbyterian Church	Hazelton Presbyterian Church	April 26, 1991 (#91000459)	310 Park Ave. 42°35′42″N 114°08′05″W	Hazelton	
26	Heuer Well House/Water Tank	Heuer Well House/Water Tank	September 8, 1983 (#83002345)	Northeast of Jerome; 42°46′02″N 114°26′38″W	Jerome	
27	Jerome City Pump House	Jerome City Pump House	September 8, 1983 (#83002344)	600 block of E. B St. 42°43′22″N 114°30′32″W	Jerome	It is a water works building built in 1922 by stonemason H.T. Pugh.
28	Jerome Cooperative Creamery	Jerome Cooperative Creamery	September 8, 1983 (#83002338)	313 S. Birch St. 42°43′21″N 114°31′18″W	Jerome	
29	Jerome County Courthouse	Jerome County Courthouse	September 28, 1987 (#87001600)	N. Lincoln; 42°43′36″N 114°31′01″W	Jerome	
30	Jerome First Baptist Church	Jerome First Baptist Church	September 8, 1983 (#83002339)	1st Ave., E. 42°43′32″N 114°30′50″W	Jerome	
31	Jerome National Bank	Jerome National Bank	January 9, 1978 (#78001069)	100 E. Main St. 42°43′27″N 114°31′06″W	Jerome	
32	Edgar Johnson House	Edgar Johnson House	September 8, 1983 (#83002340)	South of Jerome; 42°40′50″N 114°30′27″W	Jerome	
33	Clarence Keating House	Clarence Keating House	September 8, 1983 (#83002341)	Northeast of Jerome; 42°45′26″N 114°27′41″W	Jerome	
34	Thomas J. Kehrer House	Thomas J. Kehrer House	September 8, 1983 (#83002342)	North of Jerome; 42°48′59″N 114°31′42″W	Jerome	
35	Marion and Julia Kelley House	Marion and Julia Kelley House	September 8, 1983 (#83002343)	450 4th St., E. 42°35′31″N 114°07′56″W	Hazelton	
36	Ben Laughlin Water Tank House-Garage		September 8, 1983 (#83002337)	East of Jerome; 42°40′29″N 114°23′06″W	Jerome	
37	George Lawshe Well House		September 8, 1983 (#83002336)	Southeast of Jerome; 42°39′59″N 114°25′27″W	Jerome	
38	J. O. Lee House	J. O. Lee House	September 8, 1983 (#83002335)	5th Ave., E. 42°43′45″N 114°30′46″W	Jerome	
39	J. O. Lee Honey House	J. O. Lee Honey House	September 8, 1983 (#83002334)	5th Ave., E. 42°43′45″N 114°30′47″W	Jerome	
40	Joseph Mandl House	Joseph Mandl House	September 8, 1983 (#83002333)	800 N. Fillmore St. 42°43′52″N 114°30′28″W	Jerome	
41	Milner Dam and the Twin Falls Main Canal	Milner Dam and the Twin Falls Main Canal	July 10, 1986 (#86001720)	Twin Falls Main Canal between Murtaugh and Milner Lakes; 42°29′58″N 114°04′50″W	Milner Butte	Extends into Twin Falls County
42	Minidoka Internment National Monument	Minidoka Internment National Monument	July 10, 1979 (#79000791)	Hunt Rd. 42°40′42″N 114°15′00″W	Hunt	
43	J. W. and Rachel Newman House and Bunkhouse		September 8, 1983 (#83002332)	East of Jerome; 42°39′53″N 114°19′28″W	Jerome	
44	North Side Canal Company Slaughter House		September 8, 1983 (#83002331)	Northeast of Jerome; 42°44′46″N 114°30′51″W	Jerome	
45	Jessie Osborne House		September 8, 1983 (#83002329)	West of Jerome; 42°43′33″N 114°36′28″W	Jerome	
46	Greer and Jennie Quay House	Greer and Jennie Quay House	September 8, 1983 (#83002330)	Northeast of Jerome; 42°45′50″N 114°30′03″W	Jerome	
47	Julian T. Ricketts House	Julian T. Ricketts House	September 8, 1983 (#83002328)	Southeast of Jerome; 42°40′51″N 114°25′15″W	Jerome	
48	John F. Schmerschall House	John F. Schmerschall House	September 8, 1983 (#83002327)	248 E. Ave. A 42°43′27″N 114°30′53″W	Jerome	
49	L. Fay Shepard House		September 8, 1983 (#83002300)	South of Hazelton; 42°30′41″N 114°08′57″W	Hazelton	
50	Shoshone Falls Power Plant Caretaker's House		September 8, 1983 (#83002301)	Southeast of Jerome; 42°35′50″N 114°24′08″W	Jerome	
51	W. H. Silbaugh House	W. H. Silbaugh House	September 8, 1983 (#83002302)	West of Jerome; 42°43′26″N 114°35′31″W	Jerome	
52	Edward S. Spencer House and Garage and the Fred Nelson Barn	Edward S. Spencer House and Garage and the Fred Nelson Barn	September 8, 1983 (#83002303)	North of Jerome; 42°49′27″N 114°30′10″W	Jerome	
53	Arnold Stevens House	Arnold Stevens House	September 8, 1983 (#83002304)	West of Jerome; 42°43′32″N 114°35′12″W	Jerome	
54	John Stickel House		September 8, 1983 (#83002305)	West of Jerome; 42°42′42″N 114°34′39″W	Jerome	
55	Sugarloaf School	Sugarloaf School	September 8, 1983 (#83002306)	East of Jerome; 42°41′26″N 114°21′54″W	Jerome	
56	Rice Thomason Barn	Rice Thomason Barn	September 8, 1983 (#83002307)	East of Jerome; 42°41′40″N 114°23′00″W	Jerome	
57	Don Tooley House	Don Tooley House	September 8, 1983 (#83002308)	Northeast of Jerome; 42°46′35″N 114°28′30″W	Jerome	
58	Jay Van Hook Potato Cellar		September 8, 1983 (#83002309)	South of Jerome; 42°41′50″N 114°31′05″W	Jerome	
59	Jacob B. Van Wagener Barn	Jacob B. Van Wagener Barn	September 8, 1983 (#83002310)	Southeast of Jerome; 42°40′53″N 114°26′38″W	Jerome	
60	Jacob B. Van Wagener Caretaker's House		September 8, 1983 (#83002311)	Southeast of Jerome; 42°41′01″N 114°26′35″W	Jerome	
61	William T. and Clara H. Veazie House		September 8, 1983 (#83002312)	Southwest of Jerome; 42°40′30″N 114°34′33″W	Jerome	
62	Charles C. Vineyard House	Charles C. Vineyard House	September 8, 1983 (#83002313)	Southwest of Eden; 42°35′29″N 114°19′36″W	Eden	
63	Thomas Vipham House	Thomas Vipham House	September 8, 1983 (#83002314)	313 E. Ave. D 42°43′12″N 114°30′47″W	Jerome	
64	Archie Webster House	Archie Webster House	September 8, 1983 (#83002316)	West Ave. and W. Ave. B 42°43′19″N 114°31′50″W	Jerome	
65	William Weigle House and Water Tank	William Weigle House and Water Tank	September 8, 1983 (#83002315)	Northwest of Jerome; 42°45′36″N 114°35′45″W	Jerome	
66	Wilson Butte Cave	Wilson Butte Cave	November 21, 1974 (#74000741)	Address Restricted	Hunt	

== See also ==
- List of National Historic Landmarks in Idaho
- National Register of Historic Places listings in Idaho
