= Greer and Jennie Quay House =

Historic house in Idaho, United States

- U.S. National Register of Historic Places
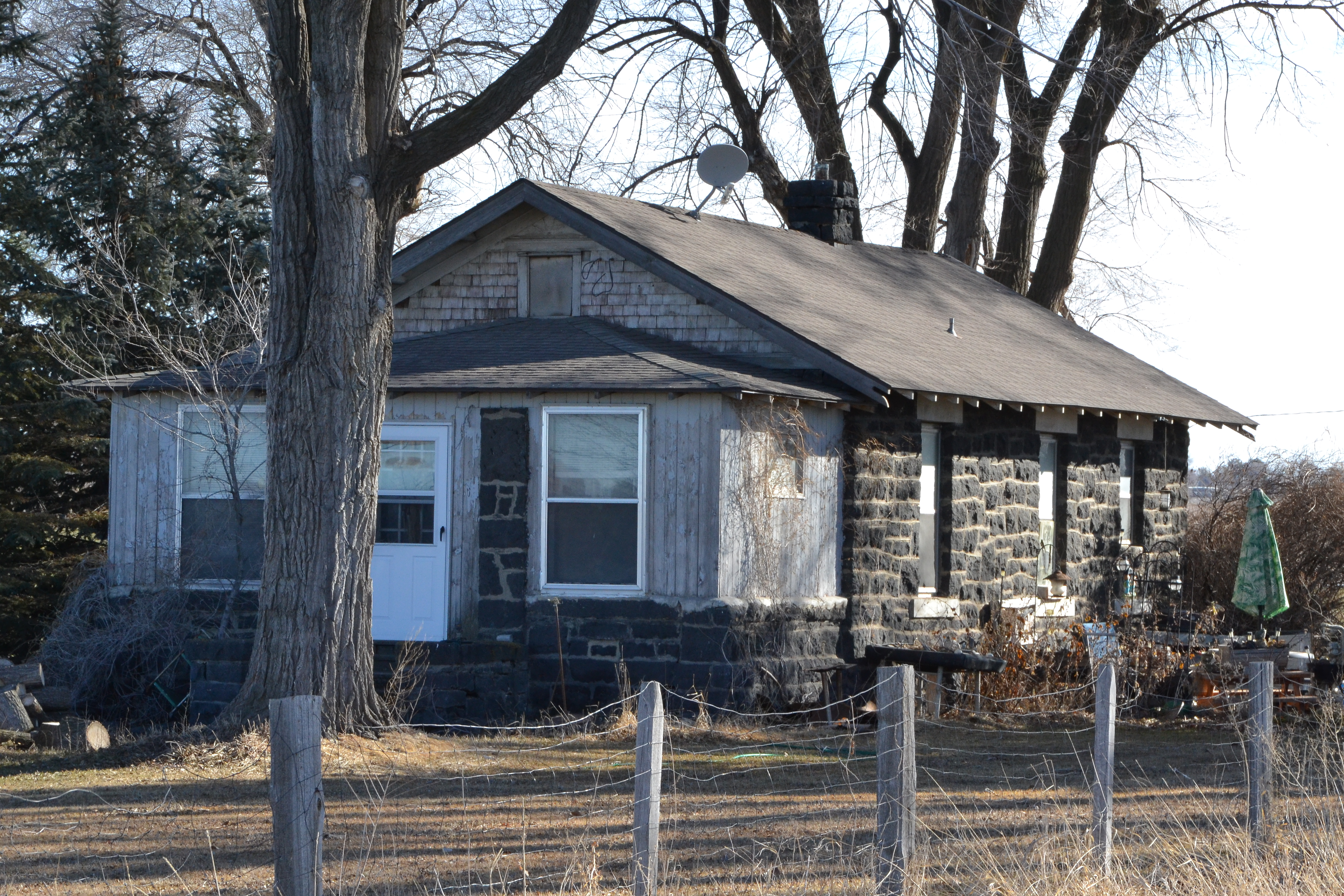

- Location within Idaho Location within the United States
- Nearest city: Jerome, Idaho
- Coordinates: 42°45′50″N 114°30′3″W
- Area: less than 1 acre (0.40 ha)
- Built: 1911–1912
- MPS: Lava Rock Structures in South Central Idaho TR (64000165)
- NRHP reference No.: 83002330
- Added to NRHP: 8 September 1983

The Greer and Jennie Quay House is a historic house located in Jerome, Idaho.

== Description and history ==
The house is ashlar masonry built of lava rock in 1911 and 1912 for brother and sister entrymen Greer and Jenny Quay. The one story building has a basement and shingled gable roof and measures about 22 feet (6.7 m) by 34 feet (10 m). The peak of each shingled gable wall has a small square and diamond design leaded glass window. The facade, on a gabled wall, has a porch about 10 feet (3.0 m) wide with a hipped roof. Square columns flanking the entrance remain but porch corner columns have been removed. Three double hung sash windows are set symmetrically on each side. These windows have cement flush lintels and projecting sills. The tops of the lintels are even with the top of the walls. Basement window lintels are large rectangular stones. The masonry is dressed throughout and the near flush joints have been tooled and filled with light sand colored mortar about .5 inches (13 mm) wide.

The Greer and Jennie Quay House was listed on the National Register of Historic Places on September 8, 1983, as part of a group of structures in south central Idaho built from local "lava rock".

== See also ==
- Historic preservation
- National Register of Historic Places listings in Jerome County, Idaho
- Stonemasonry
