= Thomas Vipham House =

Historic house near Jerome, Idaho, U.S.

- U.S. National Register of Historic Places
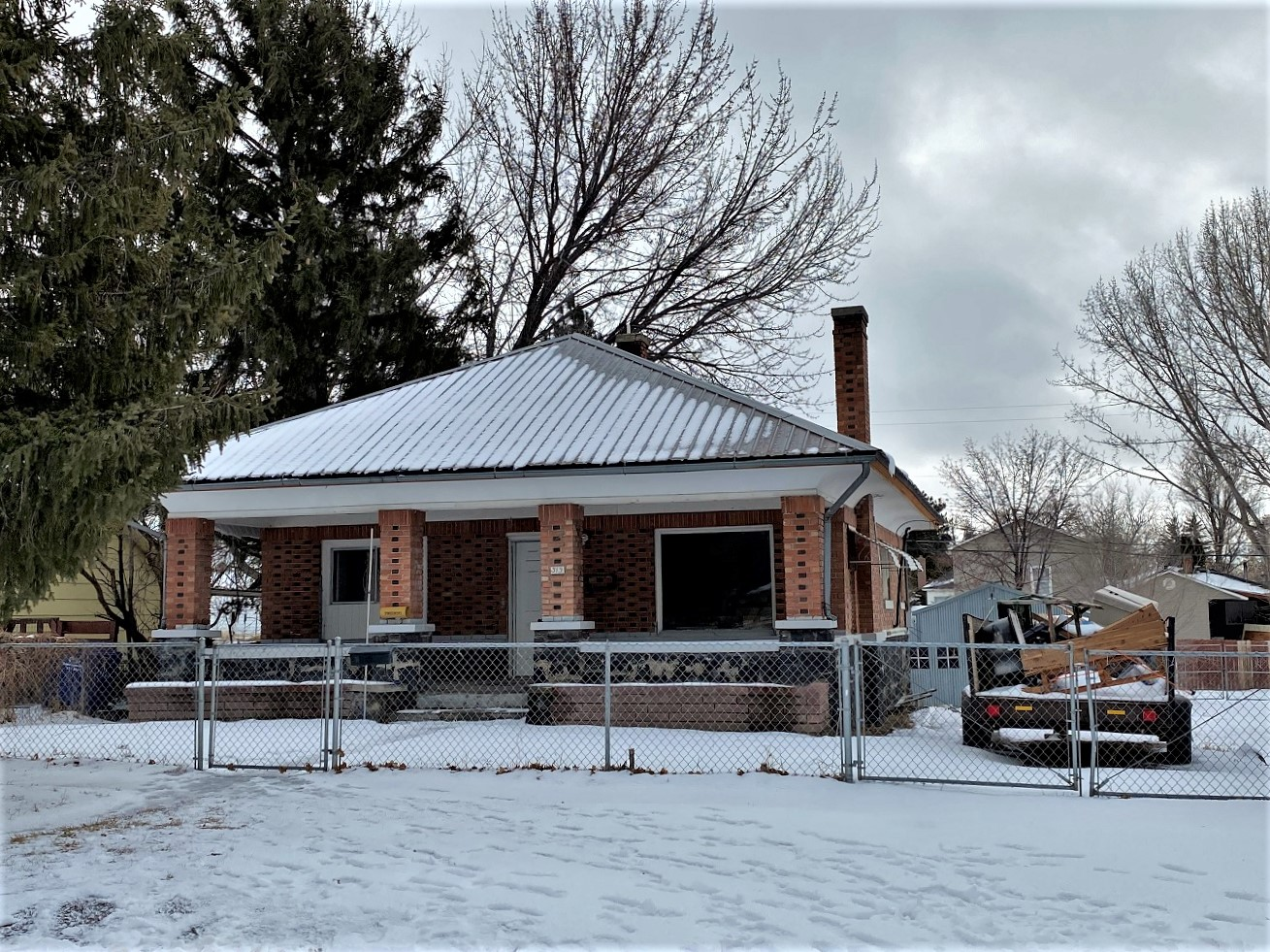

- Location within Idaho Location within the United States
- Location: 313 E. Ave. D Jerome, Idaho
- Coordinates: 42°43′12″N 114°30′47″W
- Area: less than one acre
- Built: 1920
- Built by: Thomas Vipham
- MPS: Lava Rock Structures in South Central Idaho TR
- NRHP reference No.: 83002314
- Added to NRHP: 8 September 1983

The Thomas Vipham House is a historic house located near Jerome, Idaho.

== Description and history ==
The house is built on a high foundation of lava rock was one of the first brick houses in Jerome. There was no local kiln at the time so bricks had to be shipped in. Situated on a slope the front is one story and the back is two stories. The hipped roof has wide enclosed, stuccoed eaves and is covered by shingles. The lava rock foundation extends through the facade forming the walls for a full inset porch. A narrow belt course of concrete divides the lava rock foundation from the brickwork and forms the coping of the porch. Thomas Vipham a skilled plasterer and stone and brick mason built this home for himself. It was listed on the National Register of Historic Places on September 8, 1983, as part of a group of structures built with lava rock in south central Idaho.

== See also ==
- Historic preservation
- National Register of Historic Places listings in Jerome County, Idaho
- Oregon Country
