= Arnold Stevens House =

Historic house in Idaho, United States

- U.S. National Register of Historic Places
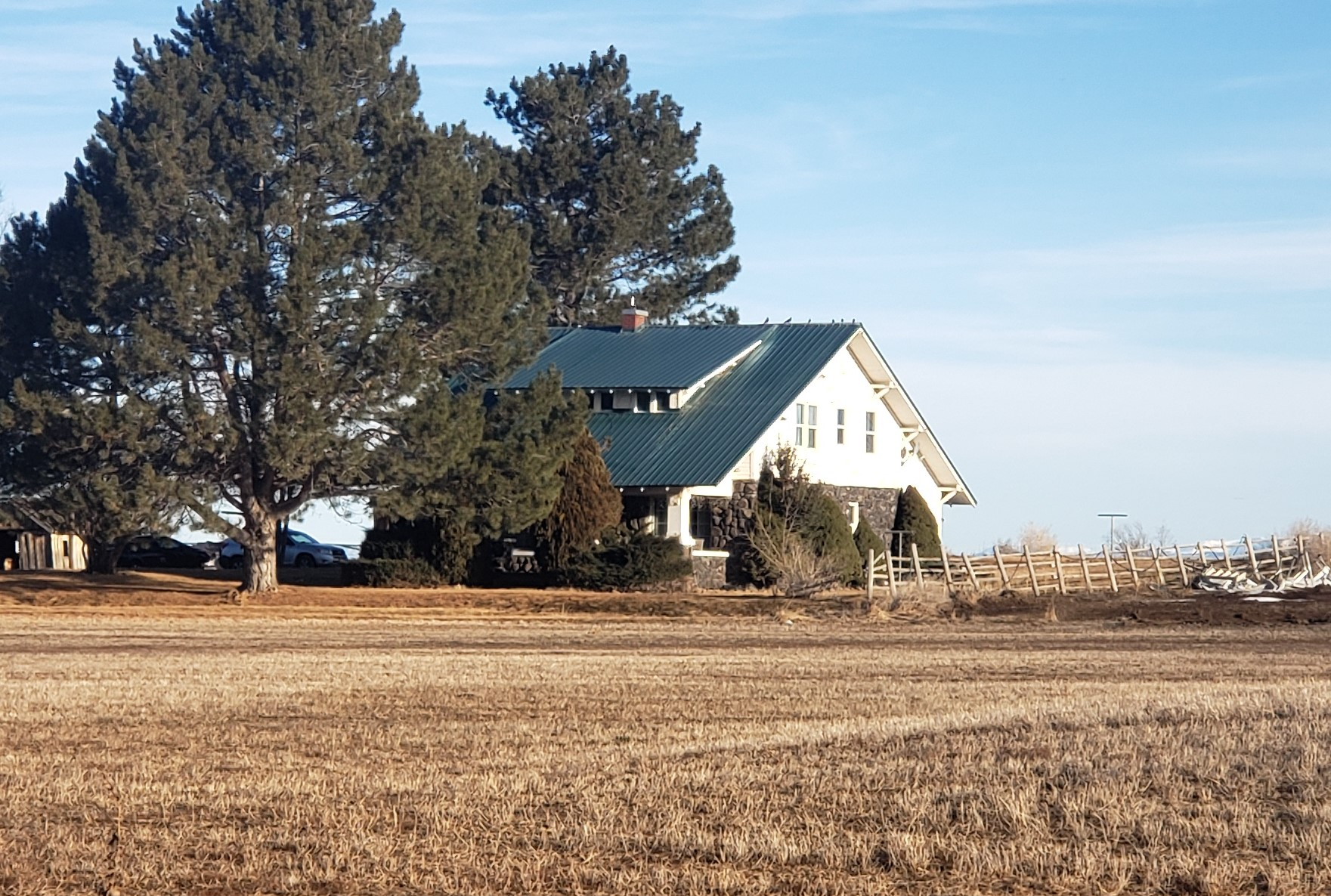

- Location within Idaho Location within the United States
- Nearest city: Jerome, Idaho
- Coordinates: 42°43′32″N 114°35′12″W
- Area: less than 1 acre (0.40 ha)
- Built: 1918
- Mason Carpenter: Otis Family; Charles Geer
- Architectural style: American Craftsman/Bungalow
- MPS: Lava Rock Structures in South Central Idaho TR (64000165)
- NRHP reference No.: 83002304
- Added to NRHP: 8 September 1983

The Arnold Stevens House is a historic house located in Jerome, Idaho. It is part of the Lava Rock Structures in South Central Idaho Thematic Resource and was listed on the National Register of Historic Places on September 8, 1983.

== History ==
Lava rock is a regional term for structures built using basalt. Building with lava rock in Jerome and Lincoln Counties of South Central Idaho was done by skilled immigrant stone masons from the 1880s until about the 1940s when the last large scale structures were built under the Works Progress Administration.

Built in 1917 and 1918 for Arnold Stevens a farmer the house is significant historically for its architecture and craftsmanship. The Otis family of stone masons from Hagerman, Idaho built the home with the carpenter Charles Geer who was assisted by Stevens. It is an exceptionally aesthetic rural exemplar of the American Craftsman Bungalow style. The contrast of dark stone with white joints, porch columns and gables are employed to create lightness and pattern while the broad wings of the gable roof suggest the building is hovering low to the ground.

== Building ==
The house is one and half stories tall and approximately 34 feet (10.4 m) by 44 feet (13.4 m). The gable roof has wide eaves and is built with decorative shingles. The front exposure has a shallow shed roofed dormer with three pairs of square single pane lights. Above the one story stone and on the dormer siding is clapboard.

There are brackets on the gables and the sides of the dormer. On the front a full inset 10 foot (3.0 m) wide porch has stone piers and concrete coping which is painted white on the corners and flanking the entrance in the center. Each corner of the porch has a square wooden column with stylized capitals and a concrete stoop extends forward. A 6 foot (1.8 m) bay, offset to the right, with a pent roof, extends about 2 feet (0.6 m) from the left wall. Most lintels are flush and of long stones except the windows flanking the entry have sloping outset concrete sills. The ten pane door is centered on the facade and flanked by two double hung sashes with six over six panes of glass. The mortar has been treated and painted white. The wooden parts are also painted white. The original interior is intact and includes oak paneling.

== See also ==
- National Register of Historic Places listings in Jerome County, Idaho
