= Bert and Fay Havens House =

Historic house in Idaho, United States

- U.S. National Register of Historic Places
- Location within Idaho Location within the United States
- Nearest city: Hazelton, Idaho
- Coordinates: 42°36′18″N 114°7′58″W
- Area: 2.5 acres (1.0 ha)
- Built: 1927
- Architect: Bert and Fay Havens (designers)
- Mason: Fred Kilgore
- Architectural style: American Craftsman/Bungalow/Stick
- MPS: Lava Rock Structures in South Central Idaho TR (64000165)
- NRHP reference No.: 83002346
- Added to NRHP: 8 September 1983

The Bert and Fay Havens House is a historic house in Hazelton, Idaho. It listed on the National Register of Historic Places on September 8, 1983, as part of a group of structures built from local lava rock in south central Idaho.

== Description and history ==
The one story house is 29 feet (8.8 m) wide and 50 feet (15 m) deep facing southwest. The architecture displays elements of American Craftsman bungalow and Western Stick styles. An off-center porch extends across three quarters of the facade, wrapping around the western side. Just to the east of the front entrance is the rear of a fireplace and chimney which extends piercing the extended gable east of its peak. The gable walls are stuccoed and the roof plan is complex with cross gables and a low shed roof covering the porch.

It was designed by owners Bert and Fay Havens and built by stonemason Fred Kilgore of Hazelton, Idaho in 1927. The stone was brought across a frozen Lake Wilson Reservoir by Bert Havens with horse teams. In addition to the stone work, Kilgore also did most of the exterior carpentry. Much of the interior carpentry was designed and executed by Fay Havens.

== See also ==
- Historic preservation
- National Register of Historic Places listings in Jerome County, Idaho
