= Archie Webster House =

Historic house in Idaho, United States

- U.S. National Register of Historic Places
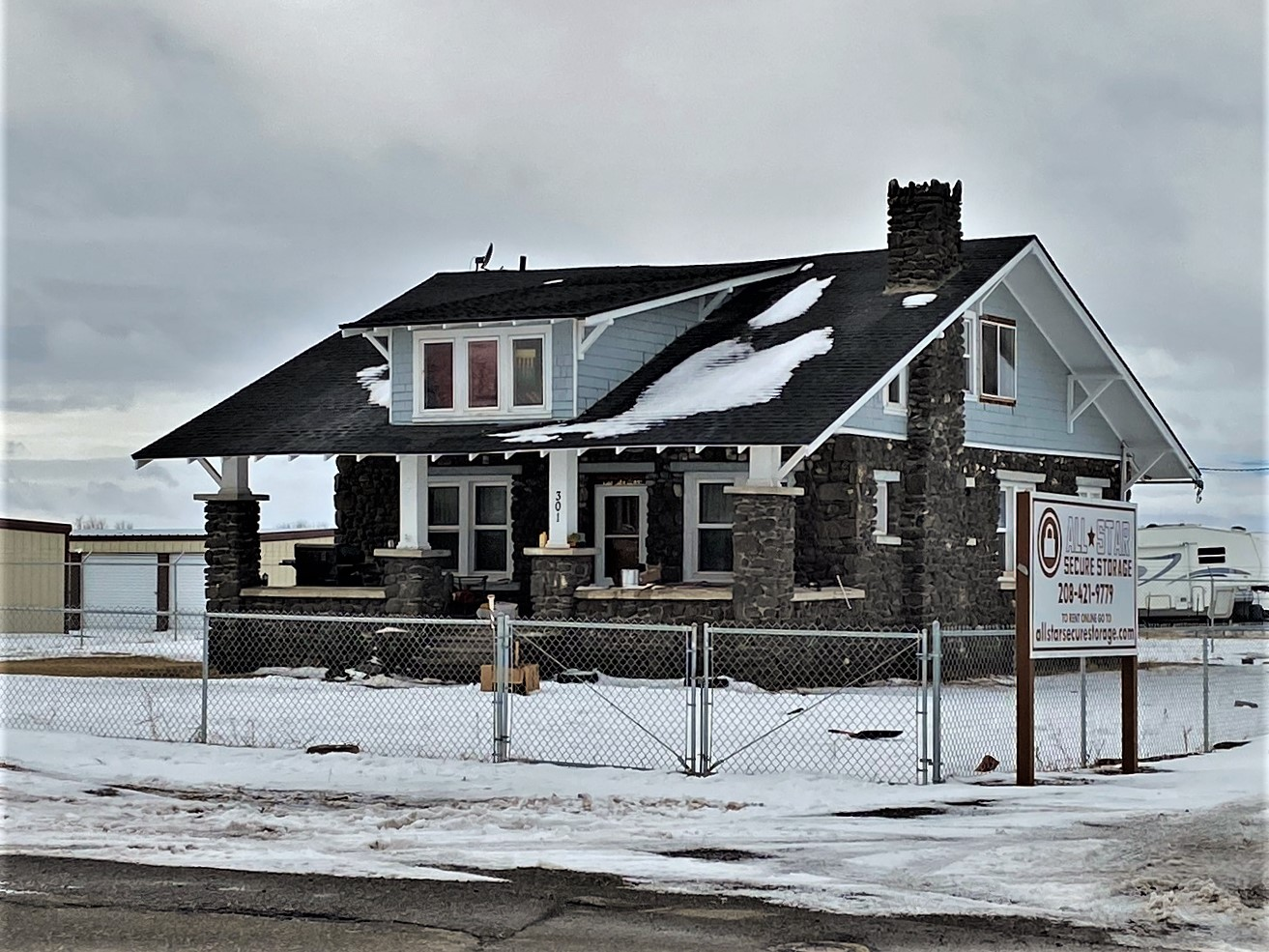
- Archie Webster House Property is located in an industrial zone.

- Location within Idaho Location within the United States
- Location: West Avenue and W Avenue B, Jerome, Idaho
- Coordinates: 42°43′19″N 114°31′50″W
- Built: 1924
- Mason: Ed Bennett
- Architectural style: Bungalow/American Craftsman
- MPS: Lava Rock Structures in South Central Idaho TR (64000165)
- NRHP reference No.: 83002316
- Added to NRHP: 8 September 1983

The Archie Webster House is a historic house located in Jerome, Idaho.

== Description and history ==
The lava rock home was built by mason Ed Bennett. It was completed in 1924 and reflects the American Craftsman architectural style. The 31-by-50-foot (9.4 by 15.2 m) building has a gable roof which overhangs a full inset porch on the east exposure. It was listed on the National Register of Historic Places on September 8, 1983, as part of a group of structures built from lava rock in south central Idaho.

== See also ==
- Historic preservation
- National Register of Historic Places listings in Jerome County, Idaho
