= Edgar Johnson =

Edgar Johnson may refer to:

- Edgar Johnson (rower) (1905–1977), American rower
- Edgar Augustus Jerome Johnson (1900–1972), American economist
- Edgar Johnson (athletic director) (born c. 1944), American swimmer, coach and athletic director
- Edgar Frederick Johnson, founder of two-way radio manufacturer EF Johnson Technologies

== See also ==
- Edgar Johnson House, a house located in Jerome, Idaho, United States
- Edward Johnson (disambiguation)
