= John Stickel House =

Historic house in Idaho, United States

- U.S. National Register of Historic Places
- Location within Idaho Location within the United States
- Nearest city: Jerome, Idaho
- Coordinates: 42°42′42″N 114°34′39″W
- Area: less than 1 acre (0.40 ha)
- Built: 1931
- Mason: Ed Bennett
- Architectural style: Vernacular
- MPS: Lava Rock Structures in South Central Idaho TR (64000165)
- NRHP reference No.: 83002305
- Added to NRHP: 8 September 1983

The John Stickel House is a historic house built of lava rock located in Jerome, Idaho, United States.

== Description ==
Built of lava rock with random rubble masonry this one story historic home has a shallow gabled roof. Unpainted shipboard covers the gables above the stonework laid by Ed Bennet. It represents an unaltered work of vernacular architecture by Bennet built from rock that was from the property of the farmer John Stickel.

== History ==
The house was built in 1931 by mason Ed Bennet. It was listed on the National Register of Historic Places on September 8, 1983.

== See also ==
- Historic preservation
- National Register of Historic Places listings in Jerome County, Idaho
