= Hugh and Susie Goff House =

Historic house in Idaho, United States

- U.S. National Register of Historic Places
- Location within Idaho Location within the United States
- Nearest city: Jerome, Idaho
- Coordinates: 42°48′42″N 114°28′19″W
- Area: less than 1 acre (0.40 ha)
- Built: c. 1921
- Mason: Marland Cox
- Architectural style: Vernacular
- MPS: Lava Rock Structures in South Central Idaho TR (64000165)
- NRHP reference No.: 83002349
- Added to NRHP: 8 September 1983

The Hugh and Susie Goff House is a historic house located in Jerome, Idaho.

== Description and history ==
The Goff House is a one-story building measuring about 34 by 44 feet (10 by 13 m) with a shallow gable roof with close eaves. The gable walls above the one story stone walls are covered with shingles. Roof covering is also shingles. The centered door has symmetrically placed one over one double hung sash on either side. Rough formed concrete lintels cap the windows and doors. The lug window sills are scooped out to emphasize their slope. The coursed rubble stone walls are composed small stones and have tight untooled joints.

This modest home, built circa 1921, is a significant example of rural vernacular architecture and of the work of stonemason Marland Cox. It was listed on the National Register of Historic Places on September 8, 1983, as part of a group of structures in south central Idaho built from local "lava rock".

== See also ==
- National Register of Historic Places listings in Jerome County, Idaho
