= Julian T. Ricketts House =

Historic house in Idaho, United States

- U.S. National Register of Historic Places
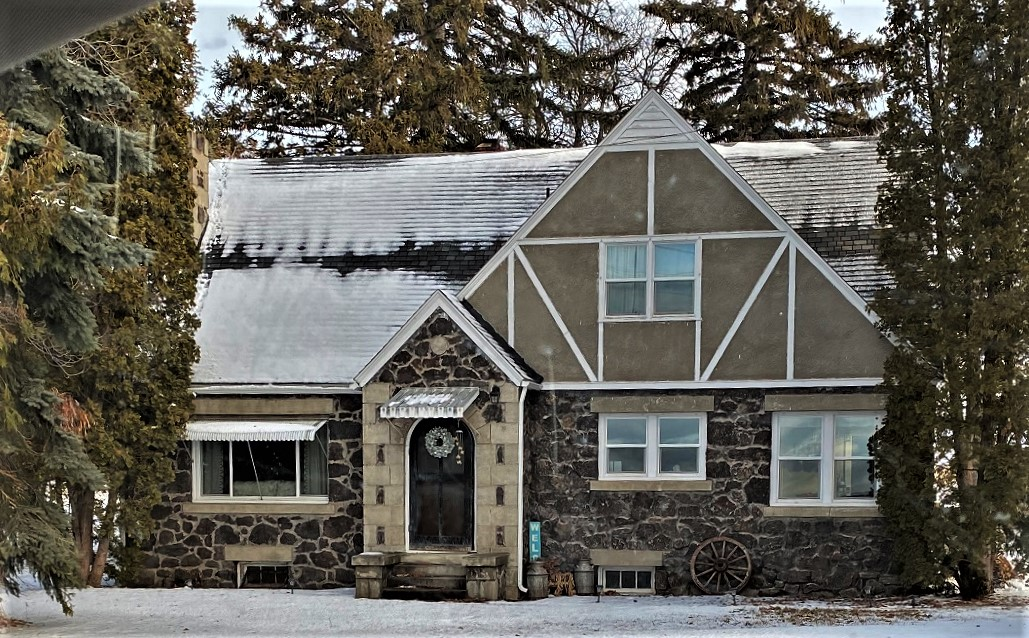

- Location within Idaho Location within the United States
- Nearest city: Jerome, Idaho
- Coordinates: 42°40′51″N 114°25′15″W
- Area: less than 1 acre (0.40 ha)
- Built: 1928
- Built by: H.T. Pugh; Maurice V. Wullf
- MPS: Lava Rock Structures in South Central Idaho TR
- NRHP reference No.: 83002328
- Added to NRHP: September 8, 1983

The Julian T. Ricketts House is a historic house built with lava rock in Jerome, Idaho.

== Description and history ==
Julian Ricketts homesteaded the property in 1911 and in 1927 began plans for the lava rock home with his wife, enlisting carpenter Maurice Wullf who in turn had plans drawn up by a professional at the Payette Lumber Company of Boise, Idaho. Master stonemason H.T. Pugh built the lower story of locally sourced stone. It was listed on the National Register of Historic Places on September 8, 1983, as part of the Lava Rock Structures in South Central Idaho Thematic Resource.

== See also ==
- Homestead Acts
- National Register of Historic Places listings in Jerome County, Idaho
