= Rice Thomason Barn =

- U.S. National Register of Historic Places
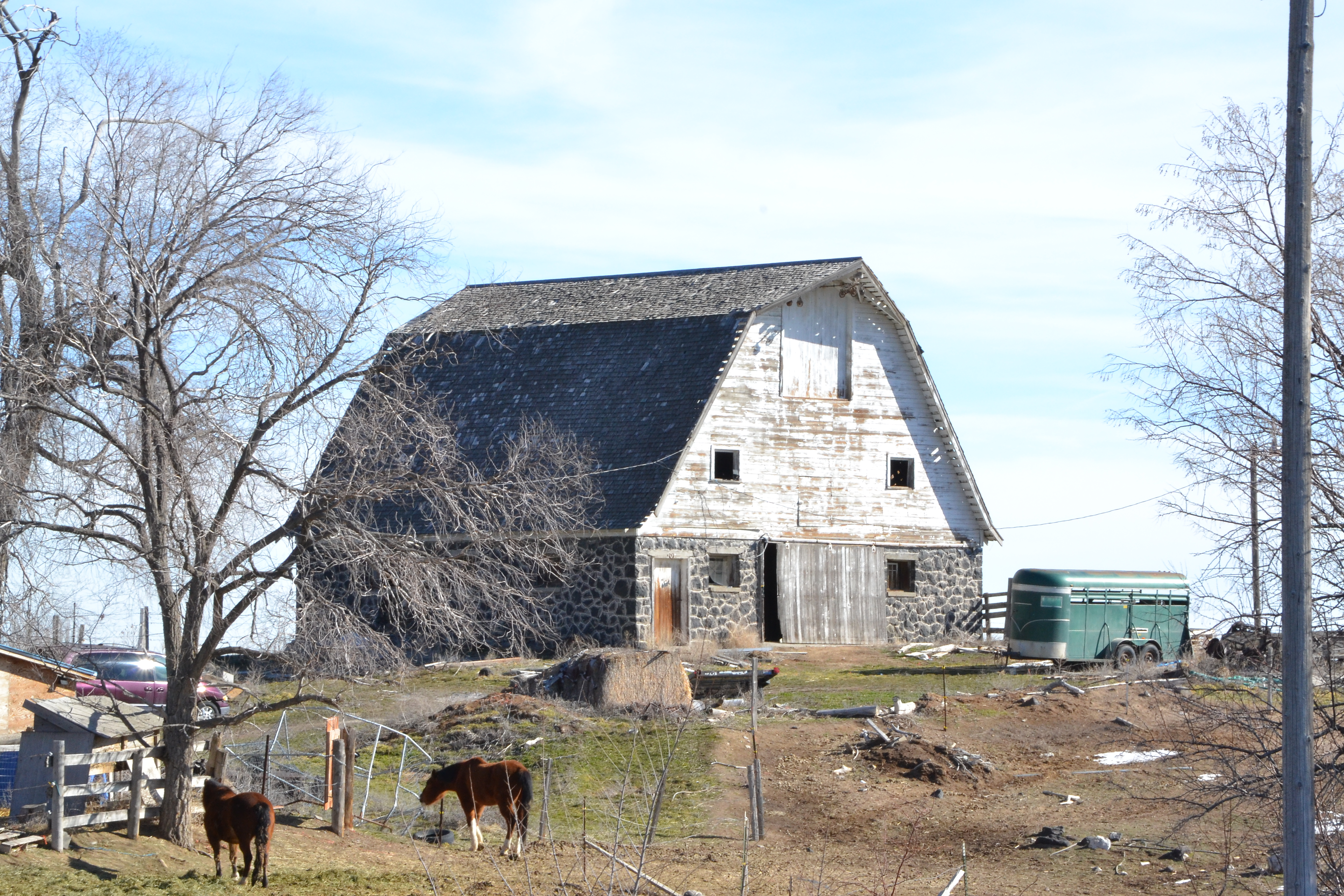

- Location within Idaho Location within the United States
- Nearest city: Jerome, Idaho
- Coordinates: 42°41′40″N 114°23′0″W
- Area: less than 1 acre (0.40 ha)
- Built: 1930
- Architect: Multiple
- MPS: Lava Rock Structures in South Central Idaho TR (64000165)
- NRHP reference No.: 83002307
- Added to NRHP: 8 September 1983

The Rice Thomason Barn is a historic farm building located near Jerome, Idaho. It was listed on the National Register of Historic Places on September 8, 1983, as part of a group of structures built from lava rock in south central Idaho.

It has a hay hood.

== See also ==
- Historic preservation
- History of agriculture in the United States
- National Register of Historic Places listings in Jerome County, Idaho
