= Edward M. Gregg Farm =

Historic farm near Jerome, Idaho, U.S.

- U.S. National Register of Historic Places
- Location within Idaho Location within the United States
- Nearest city: Jerome, Idaho
- Coordinates: 42°40′49″N 114°30′2″W
- Area: 2.5 acres (1.0 ha)
- Built: 1914
- Built by: R.W. Grant, Brannock Duffy
- MPS: Lava Rock Structures in South Central Idaho TR (64000165)
- NRHP reference No.: 83002347
- Added to NRHP: 8 September 1983

The Edward M. Gregg Farm is a historic farm located near Jerome, Idaho. The property includes a farmhouse, bunk house, well house, barn, and chicken house. The buildings were built with lava rock, a popular building material in south central Idaho in the late nineteenth and early twentieth centuries. The one-story house was built in 1914 for Edward M. Gregg, and the remaining buildings were added over the next two decades. The early 1930s well house was designed by local stonemason H.T. Pugh.

The farm was listed on the National Register of Historic Places on September 8, 1983.

== See also ==
- Historic preservation
- History of agriculture in the United States
- National Register of Historic Places listings in Jerome County, Idaho
