= Jay Van Hook Potato Cellar =

- U.S. National Register of Historic Places
- Location within Idaho Location within the United States
- Nearest city: Jerome, Idaho
- Coordinates: 42°41′50″N 114°31′5″W
- Area: 2.5 acres (1.0 ha)
- Built: 1922
- Built by: Jay Van Hook
- Architectural style: Vernacular/Potato house
- MPS: Lava Rock Structures in South Central Idaho TR (64000165)
- NRHP reference No.: 83002309
- Added to NRHP: 8 September 1983

The Jay Van Hook Potato Cellar is a historic potato house located in Jerome, Idaho.

== Description and history ==
The Van Hook potato cellar was built in 1922 using local lava rock. The low, earth covered structure is about 122 feet (37 m) long with stone end walls of about 58 feet (18 m). The facade and end walls slope to about 12 feet (3.7 m) above ground level at center. Each of these wall has an 8-foot (2.4 m) double door large enough and configured to allow wagons or trucks to drive through the building. Flush jams and lintels of rough concrete surround the doors, the lintels faced with wooden planks. Small four paned ventilation windows near ground level are on either side of the doors on both ends. The main facade door has a smaller door cut into it. The interior is supported by a pole framework covered with wire, straw and dirt. The interior floor slopes downward to about 6 feet (1.8 m) below ground level at center. The wide joints of the masonry are filled to the face of the stone making the stones appear submerged in mortar. It was listed on the National Register of Historic Places on September 8, 1983, as part of a group of structures built from lava rock in south central Idaho.

== See also ==
- History of agriculture in the United States
- National Register of Historic Places listings in Jerome County, Idaho
