= Jacob B. Van Wagener Barn =

- Jacob B. Van Wagener Barn; Jacob B. Van Wagener Caretaker's House
- U.S. National Register of Historic Places
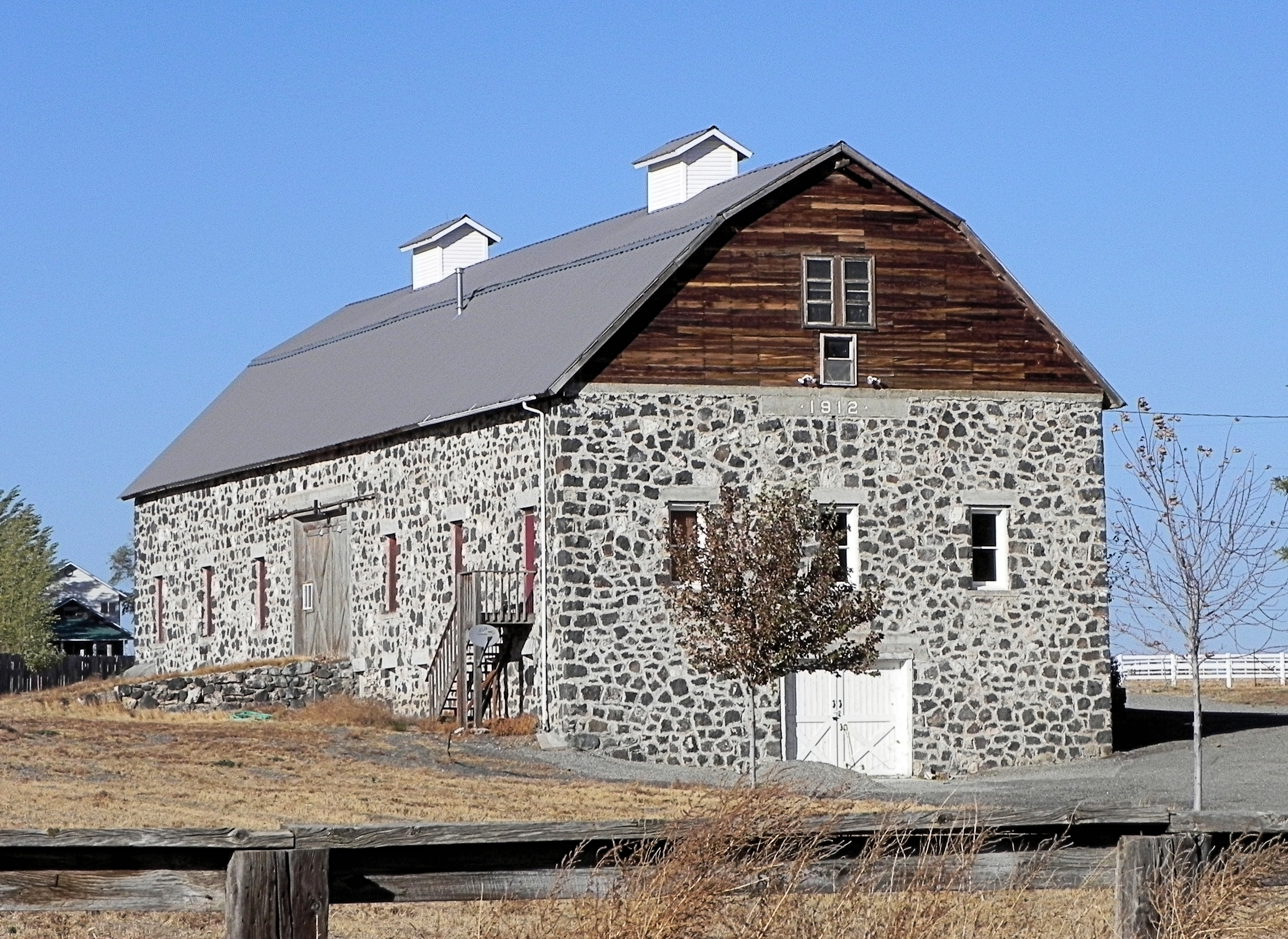
- The barn's exterior in 2012

- Location within Idaho Location within the United States
- Nearest city: Jerome, Idaho
- Coordinates: 42°40′53″N 114°26′38″W
- Area: 1.3 acres (0.53 ha);2.5 acres (1.0 ha)
- Built: 1912
- Built by: H.T. Pugh
- MPS: Lava Rock Structures in South Central Idaho TR
- NRHP reference No.: 83002310, 83002311
- Added to NRHP: September 8, 1983

The Jacob B. Van Wagener Barn is lava rock structure built in 1912. It located in Jerome, Idaho, United States, and was listed on the National Register of Historic Places in 1983.

The Jacob B. Van Wagener Caretaker's House is also listed on the National Register.

The barn is about 40 by 110 feet (12 m × 34 m) in plan.

The one-and-a-half-story caretaker's house is about 28 by 30 feet (8.5 m × 9.1 m) in plan.

== See also ==
- List of National Historic Landmarks in Idaho
- National Register of Historic Places listings in Jerome County, Idaho
