= Charles C. Vineyard House =

Historic house in Idaho, United States

- U.S. National Register of Historic Places
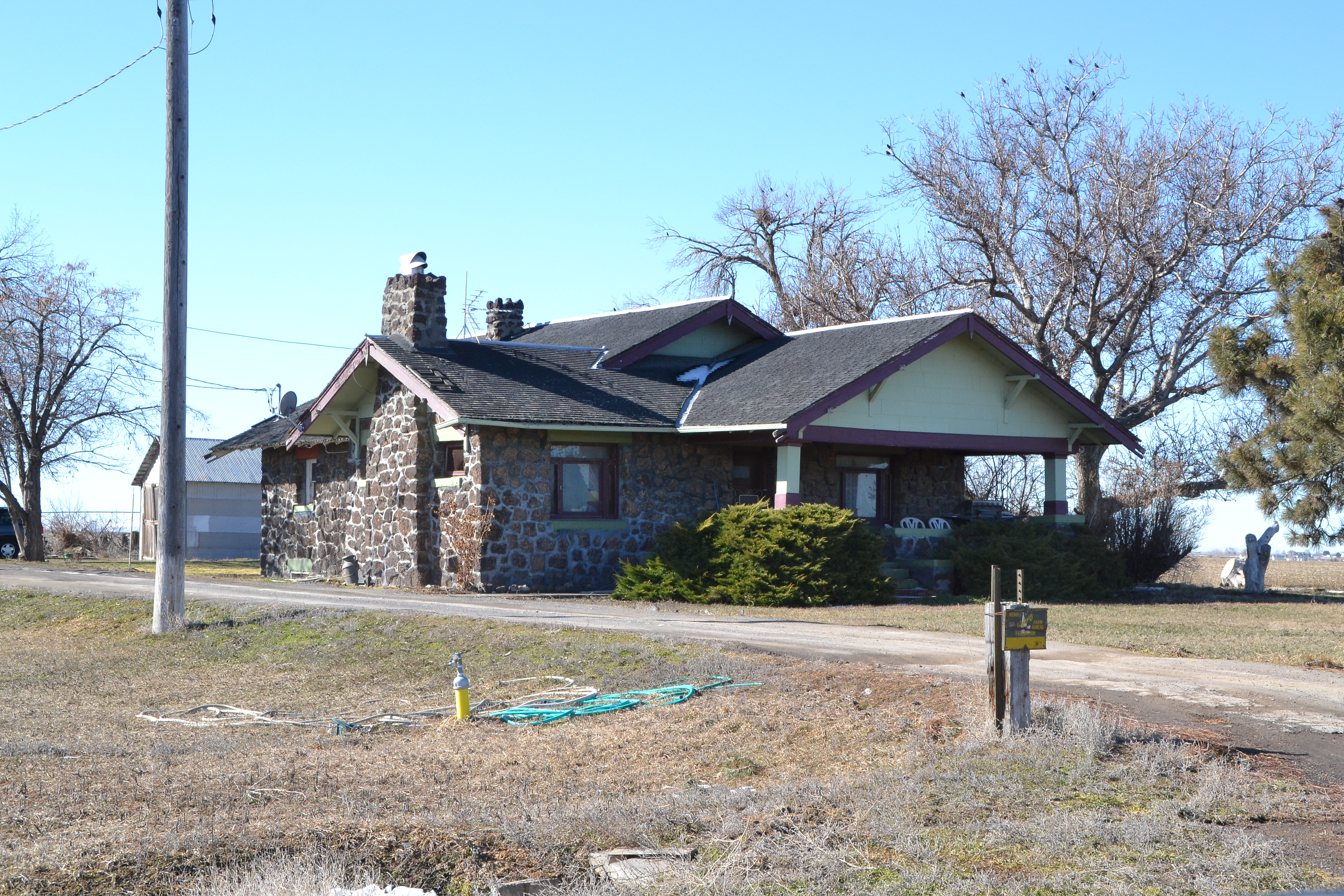

- Location within Idaho Location within the United States
- Nearest city: Eden, Idaho
- Coordinates: 42°35′29″N 114°19′36″W
- Area: less than 1 acre (0.40 ha)
- Built: 1920
- Built by: Mr. Christopherson (stonemason); Bob Homes (carpenter)
- Designer: Mrs. Charles C. Vineyard
- Architectural style: American craftsman/Bungalow
- MPS: Lava Rock Structures in South Central Idaho TR (64000165)
- NRHP reference No.: 83002313
- Added to NRHP: 8 September 1983

The Charles C. Vineyard House is a historic house located in Eden, Idaho.

== Description and history ==
The house was designed by Mrs. Charles C. Vineyard. It was built in 1920 by mason Mr. Christopherson and carpenter Bob Homes. On September 8, 1983, it was listed on the National Register of Historic Places as a part of a group of lava rock buildings in south central Idaho.

== See also ==
- Basalt
- Historic preservation
- National Register of Historic Places listings in Jerome County, Idaho
