= Jerome National Bank =

- U.S. National Register of Historic Places
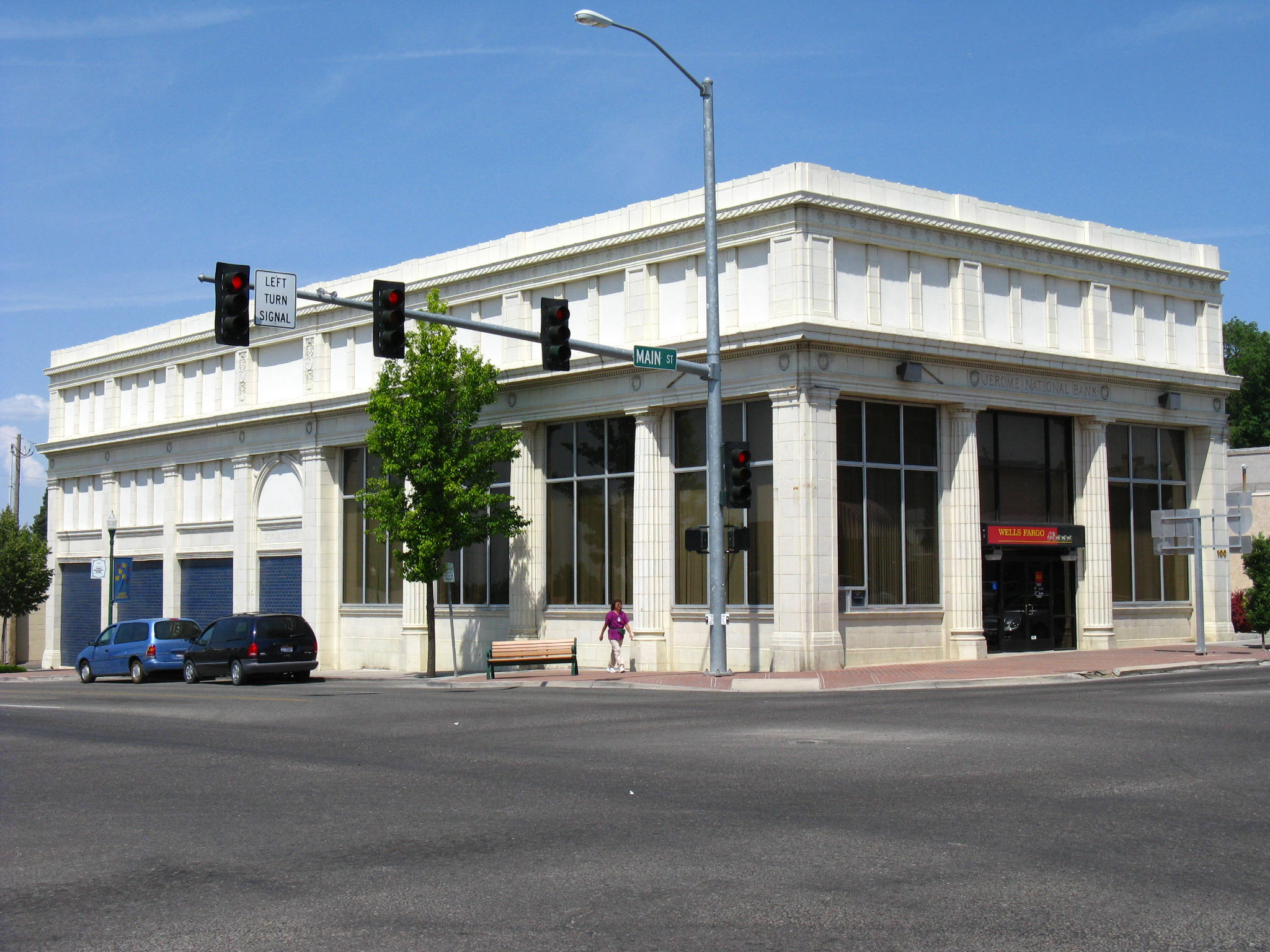

- Location within Idaho Location within the United States
- Location: 100 E. Main St., Jerome, Idaho
- Coordinates: 42.72442°N 114.51827°W
- Area: less than one acre
- Built: 1920
- Architectural style: Classical Revival
- NRHP reference No.: 78001069
- Added to NRHP: January 9, 1978

The Jerome National Bank is a building located in Jerome, Idaho, United States, listed on the National Register of Historic Places. It was built in 1920–21 in the neo-classic revival style. The exterior is covered by white terra cotta.

== See also ==
- List of National Historic Landmarks in Idaho
- National Register of Historic Places listings in Jerome County, Idaho
