= Allton Building =

- U.S. National Register of Historic Places
- Location within Idaho Location within the United States
- Nearest city: Jerome, Idaho
- Coordinates: 42°43′28″N 114°30′58″W
- Area: less than one acre
- Built: 1909
- MPS: Lava Rock Structures in South Central Idaho TR
- NRHP reference No.: 83002299
- Added to NRHP: September 8, 1983

The Allton Building is a historic building located at 160 E. Main St. in Jerome, Idaho. The commercial building was constructed in 1909 for landlord Maurice J. Allton. The back and side walls of the building were built with lava rock and are considered a good extant example of the use of lava rock for construction. The businesses which have occupied the building include a cinema, a bank, a drug store, a furniture store, a music store, and a dry cleaners.

The building was added to the National Register of Historic Places on September 8, 1983.

== See also ==
- List of National Historic Landmarks in Idaho
- National Register of Historic Places listings in Jerome County, Idaho
