= Carl Blessing Outbuildings =

- U.S. National Register of Historic Places
- Location within Idaho Location within the United States
- Nearest city: Jerome, Idaho
- Coordinates: 42°45′11″N 114°35′26″W
- Area: less than one acre
- Built: 1918
- Built by: Blessing, Carl
- MPS: Lava Rock Structures in South Central Idaho TR
- NRHP reference No.: 83002319
- Added to NRHP: September 8, 1983

The Carl Blessing Outbuildings are a smokehouse and cellar located on the Carl Blessing farm northwest of Jerome, Idaho. The two buildings were constructed by Carl Blessing shortly after he purchased his farm in 1918. Both buildings were used to store food; the smokehouse held smoked meats, while the cellar held produce such as apples. The buildings were built with lava rock and are considered good examples of storage buildings built from the rock by a farmer.

The buildings were added to the National Register of Historic Places on September 8, 1983.

== See also ==
- List of National Historic Landmarks in Idaho
- National Register of Historic Places listings in Jerome County, Idaho
