= George Epperson House =

Historic house near Jerome, Idaho, U.S.

- U.S. National Register of Historic Places
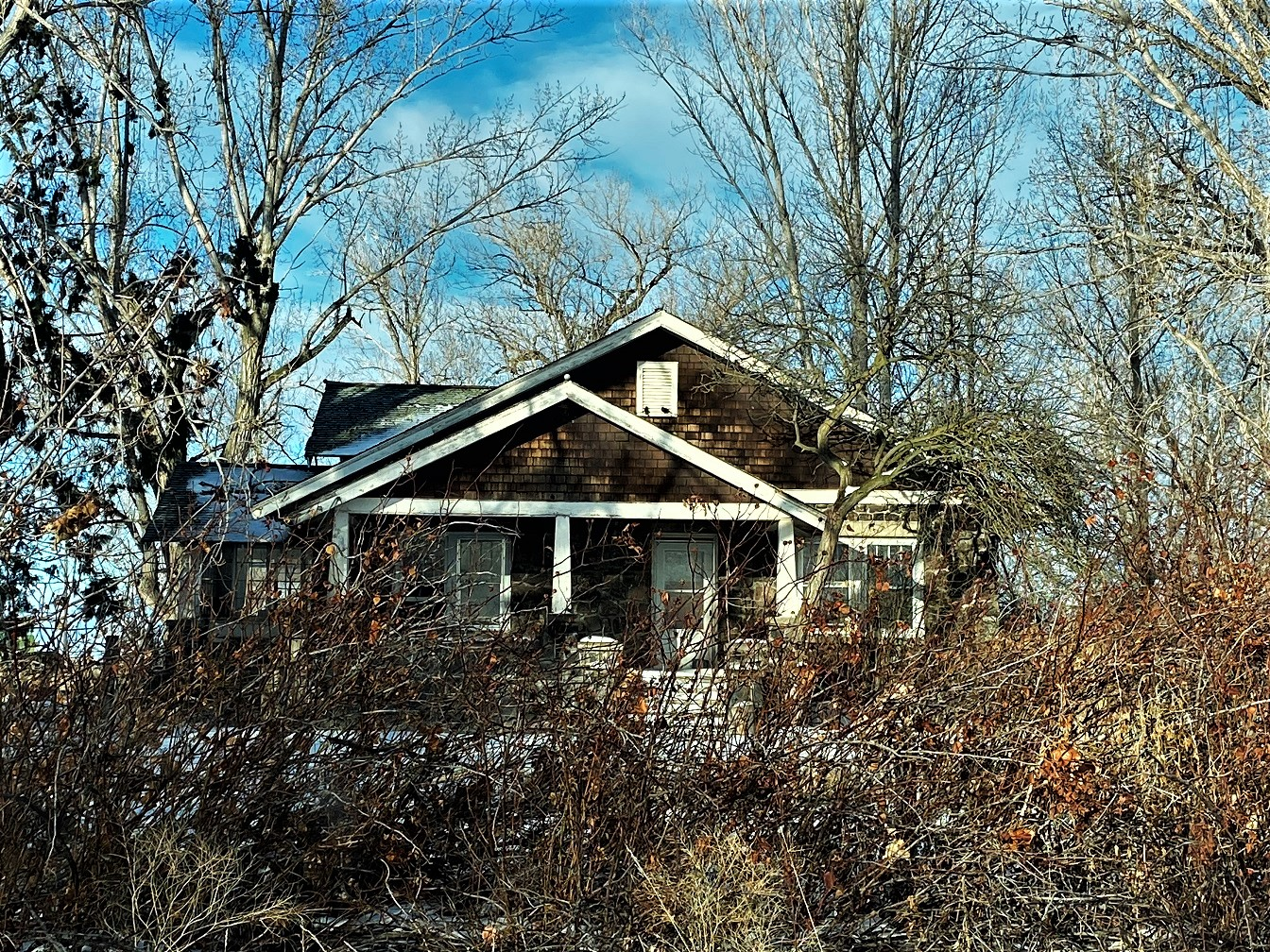

- Location within Idaho Location within the United States
- Nearest city: Jerome, Idaho
- Coordinates: 42°40′12″N 114°27′47″W
- Area: less than one acre
- Built: 1912
- Built by: George Epperson & Sons
- Architectural style: Bungalow
- MPS: Lava Rock Structures in South Central Idaho TR
- NRHP reference No.: 83002354
- Added to NRHP: September 8, 1983

The George Epperson House is a house located southeast of Jerome, Idaho, United States. Construction on the house was initiated in 1912 by George Epperson and his sons, who completed the foundation, basement, and several of the walls. The house remained unfinished for several years; additional construction was done in 1922, but the house was not completed until 1929, when George's son Ivan acquired the money to finish the building. The bungalow style house was built with lava rock; the dark rock and dark roof of the house are contrasted by the white trim and details. The house gained local notoriety in 1942 when owner Reuben Stoller was found dead in its basement; his murder was never solved.

The house was listed on the National Register of Historic Places on September 8, 1983.

== See also ==
- List of National Historic Landmarks in Idaho
- National Register of Historic Places listings in Jerome County, Idaho
