= Charles Bower House =

Historic house in Idaho, United States

- U.S. National Register of Historic Places
- Location within Idaho Location within the United States
- Nearest city: Jerome, Idaho
- Coordinates: 42°48′58″N 114°32′14″W
- Area: 2.5 acres (1.0 ha)
- Built: 1917
- Built by: H.T. Pugh
- MPS: Lava Rock Structures in South Central Idaho TR (64000165)
- NRHP reference No.: 83002321
- Added to NRHP: 8 September 1983

The Charles Bower House is a historic house located north of Jerome, Idaho, United States. The lava rock house was built by mason H.T. Pugh in 1917. The listing includes a 2.5-acre (1.0 ha) area. In addition to its rock walls, the home features a gable roof with exposed rafters and wide eaves. The original roof was replaced after a 1921 storm. The house was the home of Charles Bower and his family from 1917 until 1922.

The house was listed on the National Register of Historic Places on September 8, 1983.
