= Marion and Julia Kelley House =

Historic house in Idaho, United States

- U.S. National Register of Historic Places
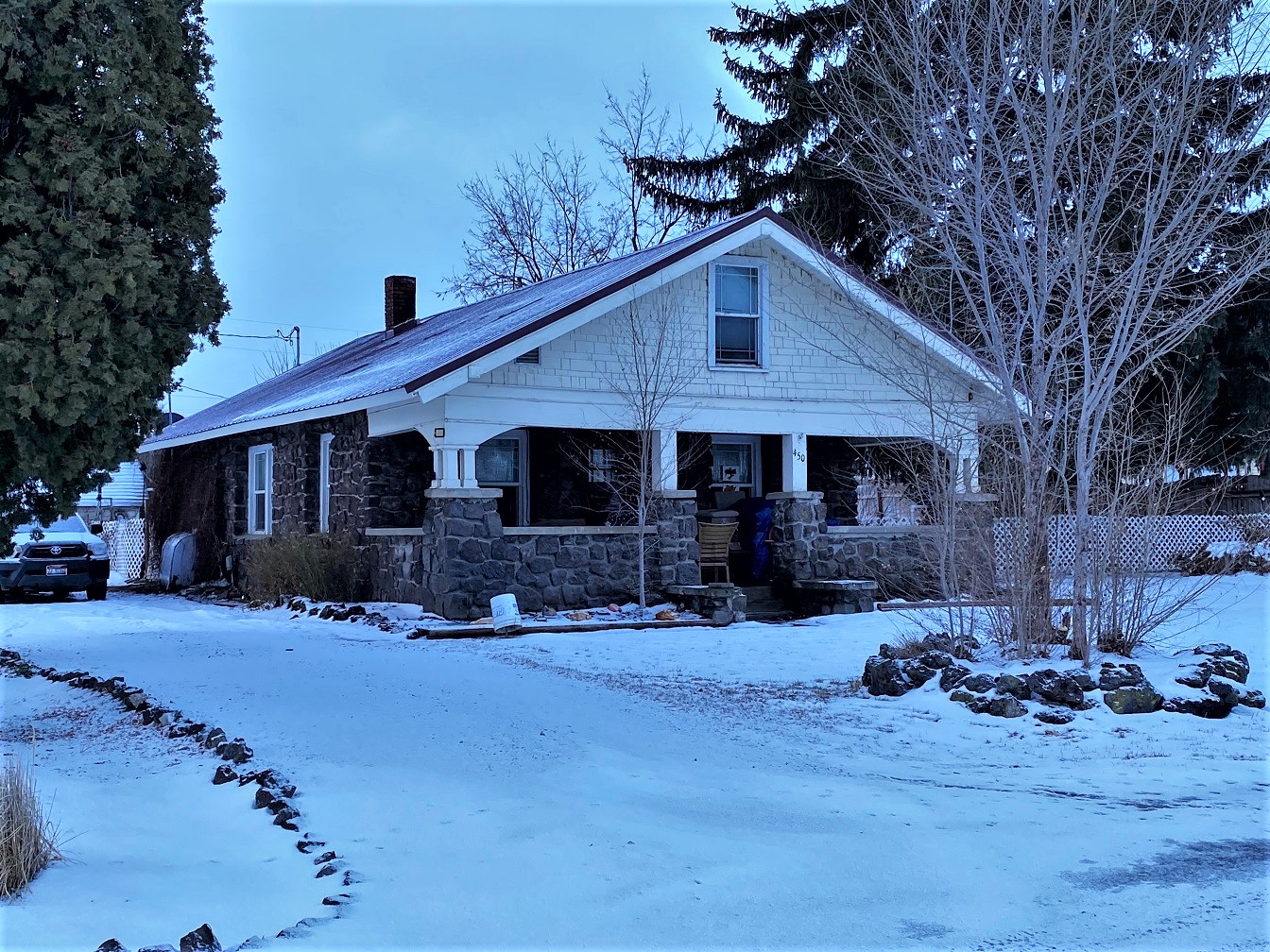
- Location: 450 4th St. E. Hazelton, Idaho
- Coordinates: 42°35′31″N 114°7′56″W
- Area: less than 1 acre (0.40 ha)
- Built: 1918
- Built by: Christopherson; Marion Kelley
- Architectural style: Bungalow/Vernacular
- MPS: Lava Rock Structures in South Central Idaho TR
- NRHP reference No.: 83002343
- Added to NRHP: September 8, 1983

The Marion and Julia Kelley House is a historic house located at 450 4th Street East in Hazelton, Idaho.

== Description and history ==
The footprint of the house is approximately 27 by 37 feet (8.2 by 11.3 m) and it is one and a half stories. The shallow gabled roof has a shingle covering. The gable facade presents a 9-foot (2.7 m) wide full porch. The one story lava rock walls have a reddish brown color. The masonry is rubble coursed with the mortar raked to a depth of 1.5 to 2 inches (38 to 51 mm) in the medium wide joints. Shingles in bands cover the gable walls above the stone. The house reflects the Bungalow style of architecture and is designed and detailed to serve as a town residence.

The rock for construction was hauled by horse and wagon from about .5 miles (0.80 km) from Hazelton. Julian Kelley obtained the title to the lot while Marion Kelley was serving in World War I. On returning he assisted a stonemason (believed to be Christopherson) in building the home, doing much of the carpentry himself. It was listed on the National Register of Historic Places on September 8, 1983, as part of the thematic resource "Lava Rock Structures in South Central Idaho".

== See also ==
- Basalt
- History of Idaho
- National Register of Historic Places listings in Jerome County, Idaho
