= George Lawshe Well House =

- George Lawshe well house
- U.S. National Register of Historic Places
- Location within Idaho Location within the United States
- Nearest city: Jerome, Idaho
- Coordinates: 42°39′59″N 114°25′27″W
- Area: less than one acre
- Built: 1920
- Built by: Vipham, H.
- MPS: Lava Rock Structures in South Central Idaho TR
- NRHP reference No.: 83002336
- Added to NRHP: September 8, 1983

The George Lawshe well house is a building located in Jerome, Idaho, United States, listed on the National Register of Historic Places.

This small building constructed of lava rock was built to shelter the pumping mechanism for a windmill belonging to George Lawshe and his family. The windmill provided water for the house and farm buildings.

== See also ==
- List of National Historic Landmarks in Idaho
- National Register of Historic Places listings in Jerome County, Idaho
