= North Side Canal Company Slaughter House =

- U.S. National Register of Historic Places
- Location within Idaho Location within the United States
- Nearest city: Jerome, Idaho
- Coordinates: 42°44′46″N 114°30′51″W
- Area: less than 1 acre (0.40 ha)
- Built: 1910
- Architectural style: Vernacular
- MPS: Lava Rock Structures in South Central Idaho TR (64000165)
- NRHP reference No.: 83002331
- Added to NRHP: 8 September 1983

The North Side Canal Company Slaughter House is a historic building in Jerome, Idaho. Built in 1910 of local lava rock it was listed on the National Register of Historic Places on September 8, 1983.

== Description and history ==
This round vernacular structure is 10 feet (3.0 m) in diameter and 10 feet (3.0 m) high. It has a cement roof and two steel beams traverse the entire structure extending beyond the walls. Built by an unknown stonemason on an experimental/demonstration farm, the building was used to hang slaughtered animals. It is one of a group of industrial lava rock structures in the region demonstrating ingenuity and resourcefulness in using locally available building material. The design and materials functioned to provide a cool protected site for the storage of carcasses.

== See also ==
- Historic preservation
- National Register of Historic Places listings in Jerome County, Idaho
