= L. Fay Shepard House =

Historic house in Idaho, United States

- U.S. National Register of Historic Places
- Location within Idaho Location within the United States
- Location: South of Hazelton, Idaho
- Coordinates: 42°30′41″N 114°8′57″W
- Area: 2.5 acres (1.0 ha)
- Built: 1919
- MPS: Lava Rock Structures in South Central Idaho TR
- NRHP reference No.: 83002300
- Added to NRHP: September 8, 1983

The L. Fay Shepard House, near Jerome, Idaho, is a lava rock structure built in the year 1919. It was listed on the National Register of Historic Places in 1983.

It is a one-and-a-half-story house approximately 29 by 31 feet (8.8 m × 9.4 m) in plan.

The house was deemed "significant as an example of its vernacular house style. It is a good example of modest homes built in rural areas in the area of this nomination in the 1910s. It was built in 1919 for farmer L. Fay Shepard. The rocks came from the property and from the nearby Snake River Canyon edge."
