= Tom Barnes Barn =

- Barnes, Tom, Barn
- U.S. National Register of Historic Places
- Location within Idaho Location within the United States
- Nearest city: Jerome, Idaho
- Coordinates: 42°39′53″N 114°17′46″W
- Area: less than one acre
- Built: 1930
- Architect: Multiple
- MPS: Lava Rock Structures in South Central Idaho TR
- NRHP reference No.: 83002317
- Added to NRHP: September 8, 1983

The Tom Barnes Barn is a historic barn located on State Highway 25 approximately 11.5 miles (18.5 km) east of Jerome, Idaho. Farmer Tom Barnes began construction of the barn in 1929; in 1930, stonemason Pete Duffy finished the building. The barn features an arched rainbow roof and a lava rock foundation; the roof style is considered unusual for barns in the region.

The barn was added to the National Register of Historic Places on September 8, 1983.

== See also ==
- List of National Historic Landmarks in Idaho
- National Register of Historic Places listings in Jerome County, Idaho
