= Dick Callen House =

Historic house in Idaho, United States

- U.S. National Register of Historic Places
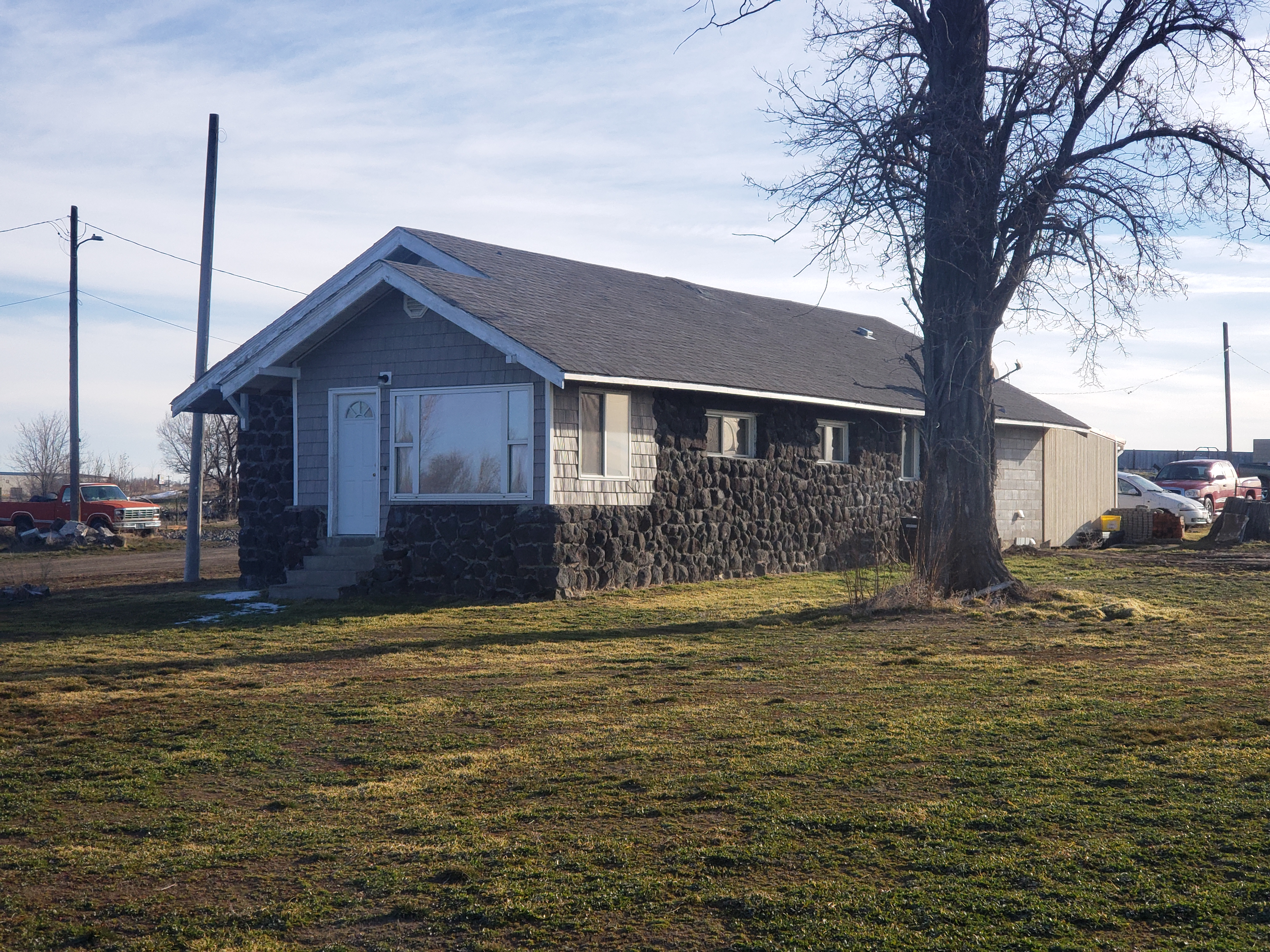

- Location within Idaho Location within the United States
- Nearest city: Jerome, Idaho
- Coordinates: 42°40′36″N 114°31′2″W
- Area: less than one acre
- Built: 1917
- Architectural style: Bungalow
- MPS: Lava Rock Structures in South Central Idaho TR
- NRHP reference No.: 83002323
- Added to NRHP: September 8, 1983

The Dick Callen House is a historic house located 3.25 miles (5.23 km) south of Jerome, Idaho, United States. The lava rock home was built in 1917 by a stonemason named Otis. The home is designed in the bungalow style and features a gable roof with exposed rafters, wide eaves, and multiple purlins.

The house was listed on the National Register of Historic Places on September 8, 1993.

== See also ==
- List of National Historic Landmarks in Idaho
- National Register of Historic Places listings in Jerome County, Idaho
