= James Bothwell Water Tank House =

- U.S. National Register of Historic Places
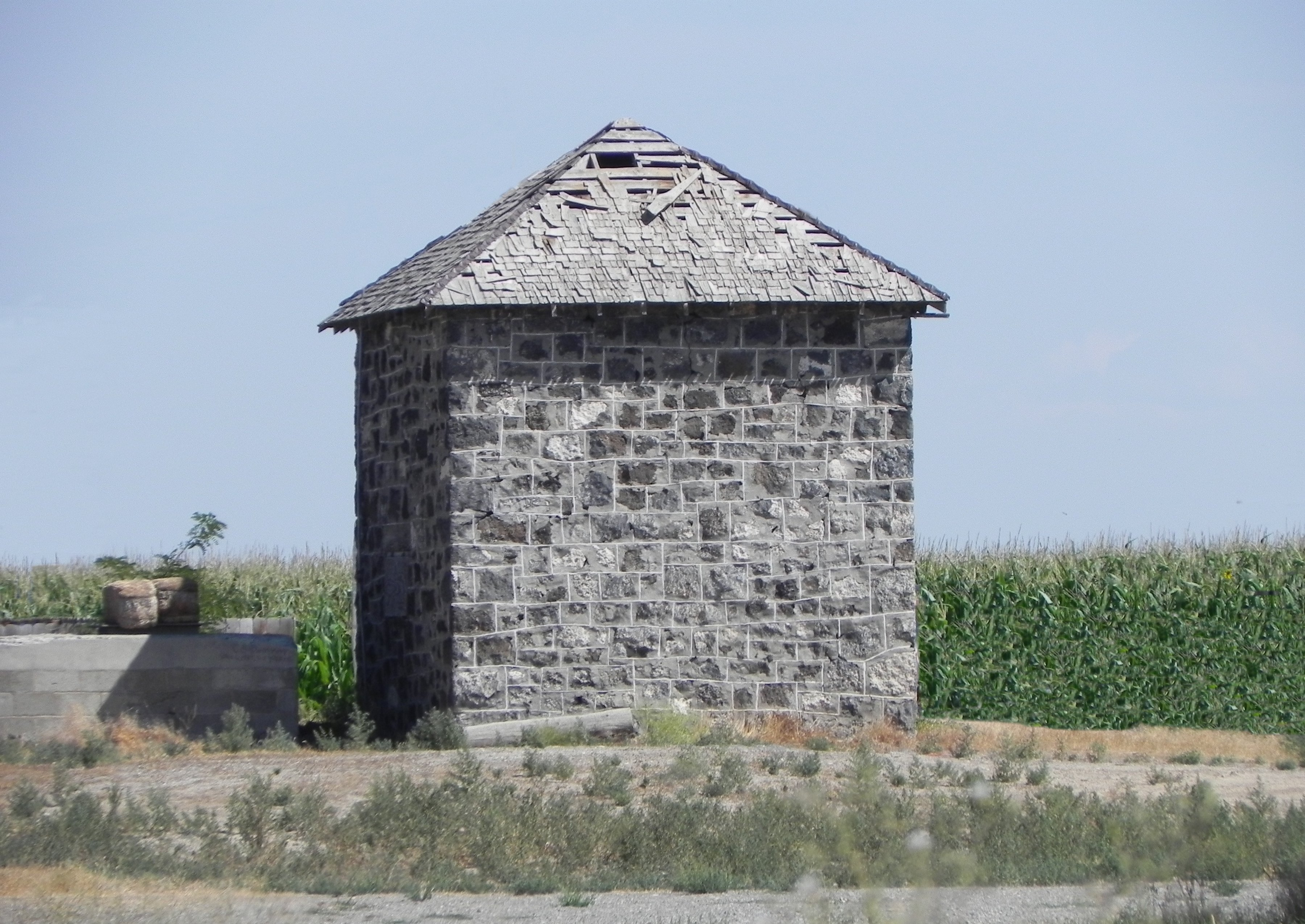

- Location within Idaho Location within the United States
- Nearest city: Jerome, Idaho
- Coordinates: 42°46′6″N 114°31′0″W
- Area: less than one acre
- Built: 1926
- Built by: Gott, John
- MPS: Lava Rock Structures in South Central Idaho TR
- NRHP reference No.: 83002320
- Added to NRHP: September 8, 1983

The James Bothwell Water Tank House is a water tank house located on a farm 3.25 miles (5.23 km) north of Jerome, Idaho. The building was constructed circa 1926 for James Bothwell, a local lawyer and farmland investor. Bothwell built the tank house and a well on the property to help provide water for the farm. The building was constructed with lava rock by stonemason John Gott, who was trained in Germany. It is one of two original rock water tank houses remaining in Jerome and Lincoln Counties.

The building was added to the National Register of Historic Places on September 8, 1983.

== See also ==
- List of National Historic Landmarks in Idaho
- National Register of Historic Places listings in Jerome County, Idaho
