= William T. and Clara H. Veazie House =

House in Jerome County, Idaho

- U.S. National Register of Historic Places
- Location within Idaho Location within the United States
- Location: Southwest of Jerome, Idaho
- Coordinates: 42°40′30″N 114°34′33″W
- Area: 2.5 acres (1.0 ha)
- Built: 1912; 114 years ago
- Built by: Vipham, Thomas
- MPS: Lava Rock Structures in South Central Idaho TR
- NRHP reference No.: 83002312
- Added to NRHP: September 8, 1983

The William T. and Clara H. Veazie House, near Jerome, Idaho, is a lava rock structure built in 1912. It was listed on the National Register of Historic Places in 1983.

The house was built in 1912 by stonemason Thomas Vipham for farmer William T. and Clara H. Veazie. It is a lateral gable house which is one and one half stories tall, approximately 29 by 45 feet (8.8 m × 13.7 m) in plan.

It was deemed "architecturally significant as an early example of the use of lava rock for bungalow style houses and for its stone craftsmanship." The nomination states that it "is one of the earliest houses of stone built in Jerome County with features such as the dormer, the inset porch, and massing that place it in the bungalow tradition. At the same time it retains traces of older traditions in its enclosed eaves, flat arches above the windows, and steep roof. It shows excellent craftsmanship."
