= W. H. Silbaugh House =

Historic house in Idaho, United States

- U.S. National Register of Historic Places
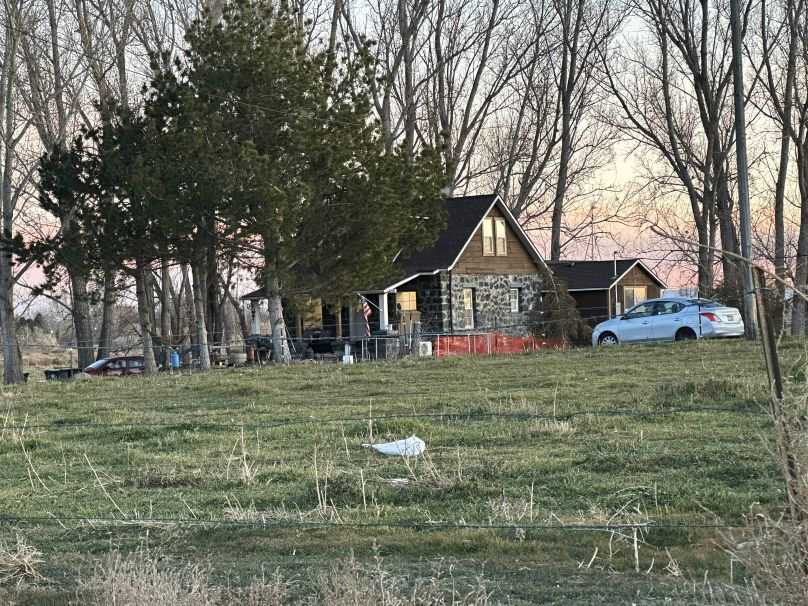
- W. H. Silbaugh House in 2025

- Location within Idaho Location within the United States
- Nearest city: Jerome, Idaho
- Coordinates: 42°43′26″N 114°35′31″W
- Area: 2.5 acres (1.0 ha)
- Built: 1920
- Built by: Otis, Walter
- Architectural style: Bungalow/craftsman
- MPS: Lava Rock Structures in South Central Idaho TR
- NRHP reference No.: 83002302
- Added to NRHP: September 8, 1983

The W. H. Silbaugh House, near Jerome, Idaho, is a lava rock structure built in 1920. It was listed on the National Register of Historic Places in 1983.

It is a one-and-one-half-story bungalow-style house on a high foundation. It is about 24 by 26 feet (7.3 m × 7.9 m) in plan.

The house was deemed "significant as an example of its vernacular house style. It is a good example of modest homes built in rural areas in the area ... in the 1910s."
