= Bethune–Ayres House =

Historic house in Idaho, United States

- U.S. National Register of Historic Places
- Location within Idaho Location within the United States
- Nearest city: Jerome, Idaho
- Coordinates: 42°41′0″N 114°21′50″W
- Area: 2.5 acres (1.0 ha)
- Built: 1920
- MPS: Lava Rock Structures in South Central Idaho TR
- NRHP reference No.: 83002318
- Added to NRHP: September 8, 1983

The Bethune–Ayres House is a historic house located 8 miles (13 km) east of Jerome, Idaho. The lava rock house has a vernacular design which features concrete lintels and windowsills and a symmetrical front facade. The house was owned by local shepherd Peter G. Bethune and was likely also owned by a Captain Ayres.

The house was added to the National Register of Historic Places on September 8, 1983.
