= Edgar Johnson House =

Historic house in Idaho, United States

- U.S. National Register of Historic Places
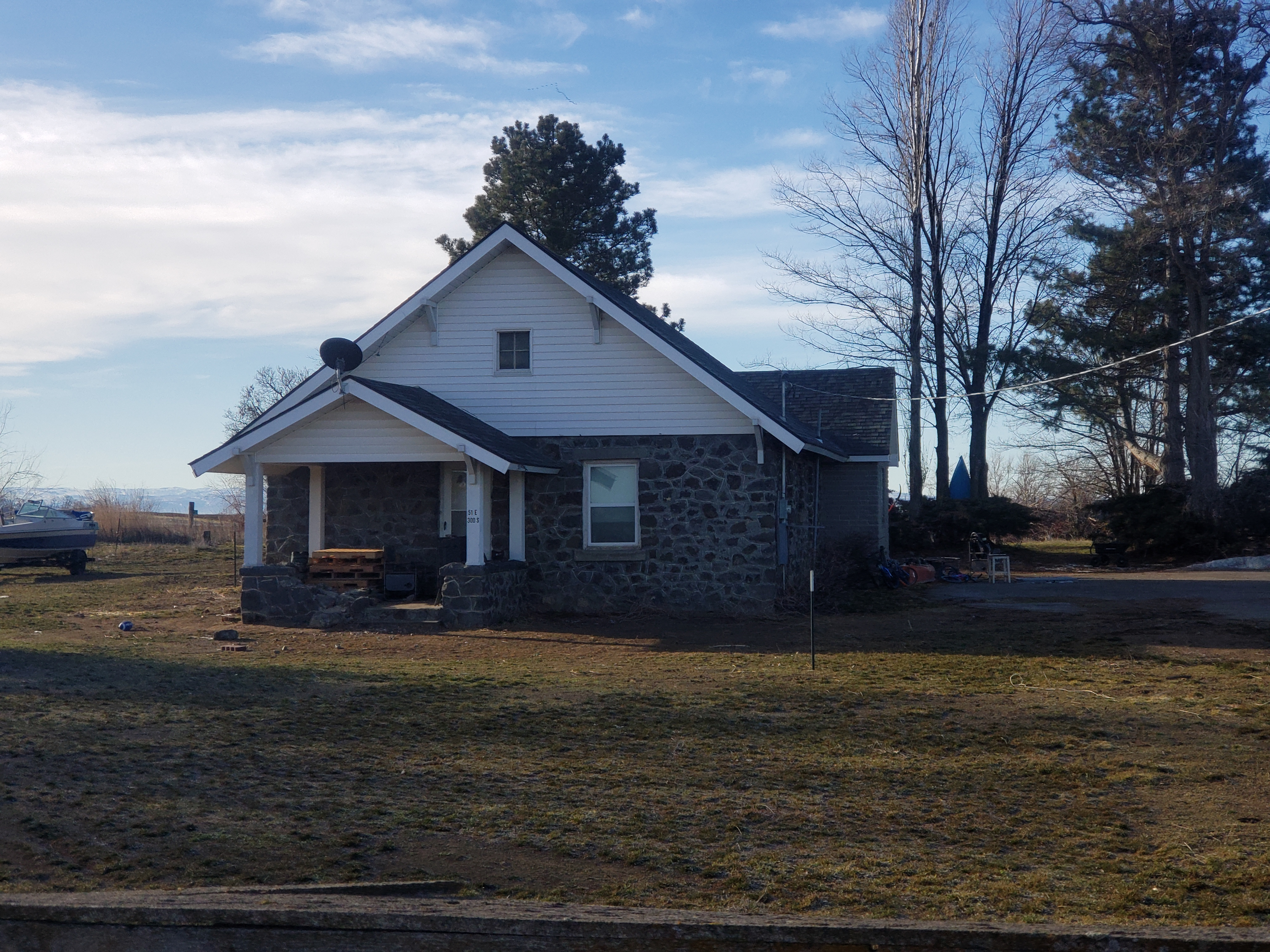

- Location within Idaho Location within the United States
- Nearest city: Jerome, Idaho
- Coordinates: 42°40′50″N 114°30′27″W
- Area: 2.5 acres (1.0 ha)
- Built: 1910
- Architectural style: Bungalow/craftsman
- MPS: Lava Rock Structures in South Central Idaho TR
- NRHP reference No.: 83002340
- Added to NRHP: September 8, 1983

The Edgar Johnson House is a house located in Jerome, Idaho, United States, listed on the National Register of Historic Places. It is locally significant as an example of rural vernacular bungalow design, as well as lava rock craftsmanship. With its double gable facade, this house represents the standard patternbook bungalow style.

== See also ==
- List of National Historic Landmarks in Idaho
- National Register of Historic Places listings in Jerome County, Idaho
