= O. J. Daniels House =

Historic house in Idaho, United States

- U.S. National Register of Historic Places
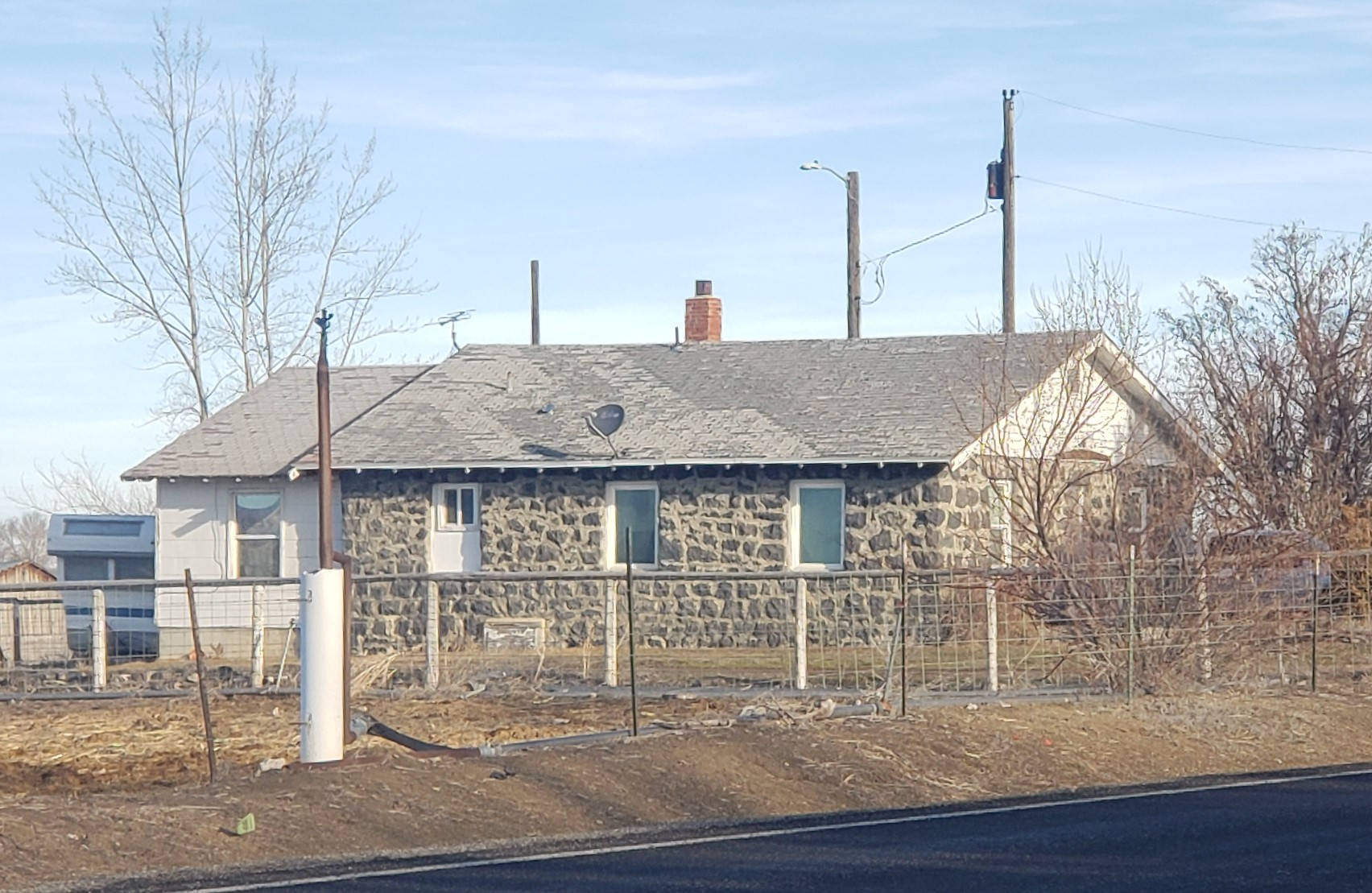

- Location within Idaho Location within the United States
- Nearest city: Jerome, Idaho
- Coordinates: 42°39′16″N 114°31′4″W
- Area: 2 acres (0.81 ha)
- Built: c. 1928
- MPS: Lava Rock Structures in South Central Idaho TR
- NRHP reference No.: 83002325
- Added to NRHP: September 8, 1983

The O. J. Daniels House is a historic house located 4.75 miles (7.64 km) south of Jerome, Idaho. This house, built from lava rock, was constructed around 1928 for farmer O. J. Daniels. Although the home's craftsmanship resembles stonemason Marland Cox, the builder has not been definitively determined. The vernacular design features symmetrical windows topped by flat rock arches, a stone lintel above the front door, and a gable roof.

The house was added to the National Register of Historic Places on September 8, 1983.
