= G. H. Erdman House =

Historic house in Idaho, United States

- U.S. National Register of Historic Places
- Location within Idaho Location within the United States
- Nearest city: Jerome, Idaho
- Coordinates: 42°43′31″N 114°36′6″W
- Area: less than one acre
- Built: 1920
- Built by: Otis Brothers
- MPS: Lava Rock Structures in South Central Idaho TR
- NRHP reference No.: 83002353
- Added to NRHP: September 8, 1983

The G. H. Erdman House is a historic house located 4.5 miles (7.2 km) west of Jerome, Idaho. The house was constructed circa 1920 for farmer G. H. Erdman. Local stonemasons the Otis Brothers constructed the lava rock home. The home's design includes a clipped gable roof, shiplap within the gables, decoratively arranged panes of glass in the front windows, and a fruit cellar in the back of the building.

The house was added to the National Register of Historic Places on September 8, 1983.
