= Ben Laughlin Water Tank House-Garage =

- U.S. National Register of Historic Places
- Location within Idaho Location within the United States
- Location: 7 miles (11 km) east, 1.5 miles (2.4 km) south of Jerome, Idaho
- Coordinates: 42°40′29″N 114°23′6″W
- Area: 1.2 acres (0.49 ha)
- Built: 1927
- Mason: Ed Bennett
- MPS: Lava Rock Structures in South Central Idaho TR (64000165)
- NRHP reference No.: 83002337
- Added to NRHP: 8 September 1983

The Ben Laughlin Water Tank House-Garage, near Jerome, Idaho, was built in 1927. It was listed on the National Register of Historic Places in 1983.

It is located seven miles east and one and one-half miles south of Jerome. It is an approximately 26 feet (7.9 m) wide structure, with a garage portion about 18 feet (5.5 m) long and a water tank which is about 16 feet (4.9 m) tall.

It is the only water tank positively known to have been built by stonemason Ed Bennett which survives and is included in the 1983 survey of lava rock structures in the county.
