= J. O. Lee House and J. O. Lee Honey House =

Historic houses in Idaho, United States

- J. O. Lee House; J. O. Lee Honey House
- U.S. National Register of Historic Places
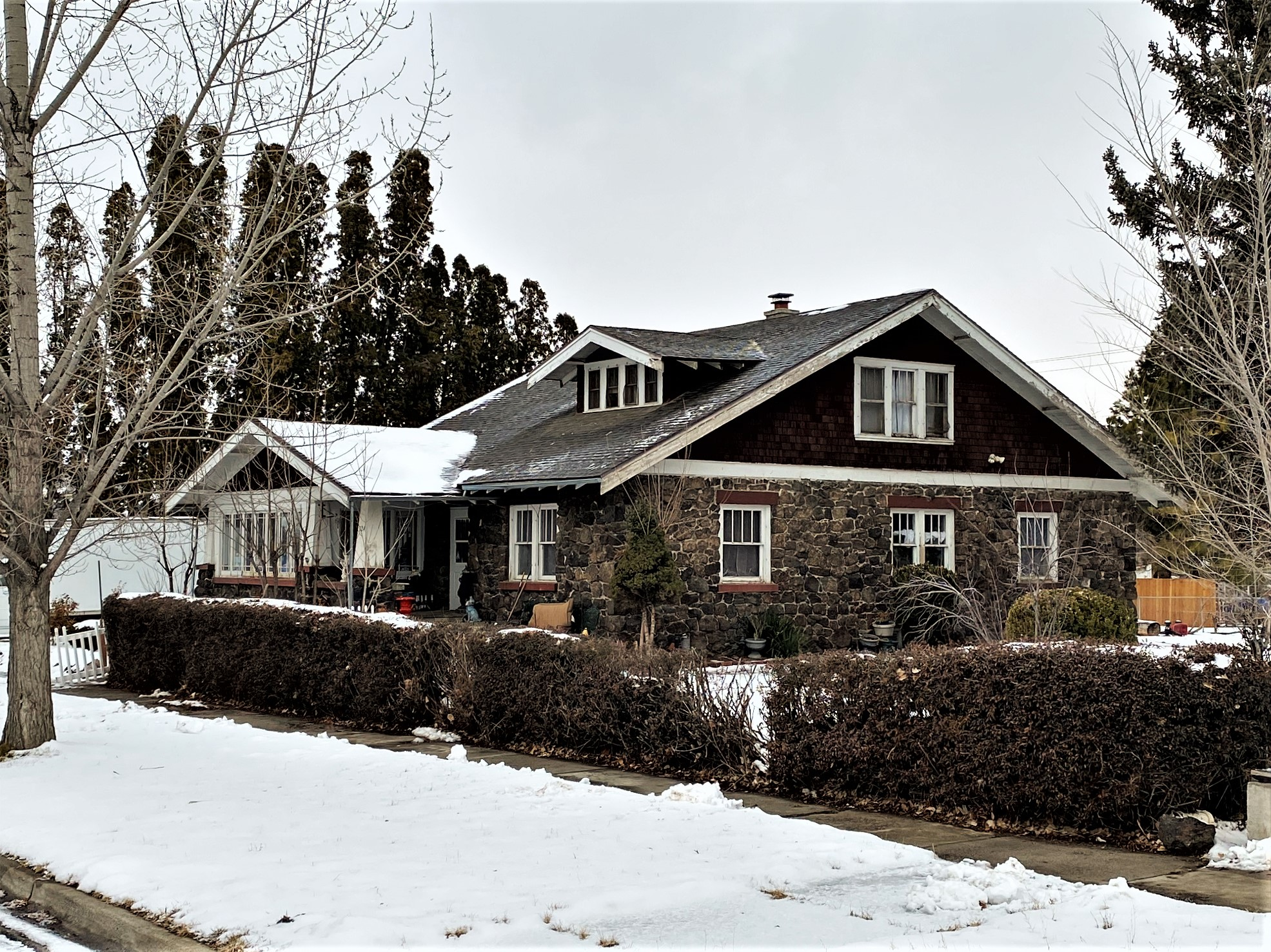
- The J. O. Lee House

- Location within Idaho Location within the United States
- Location: 324 Fifth Avenue East, Jerome, Idaho
- Coordinates: 42°43′45″N 114°30′46″W
- Area: less than one acre
- Built: 1929, 1926
- Built by: Lee, J. O.; Bryant, Jeremiah
- Architectural style: Bungalow/craftsman
- MPS: Lava Rock Structures in South Central Idaho TR
- NRHP reference No.: 83002335
- Added to NRHP: September 8, 1983

The J. O. House and the J. O. Lee Honey House in Jerome, Idaho are lava rock structures built in 1929 and 1926. They were separately listed on the National Register of Historic Places in 1983.

The house is located at 324 Fifth Avenue East.

The Honey House is at 322 Fifth Avenue East.

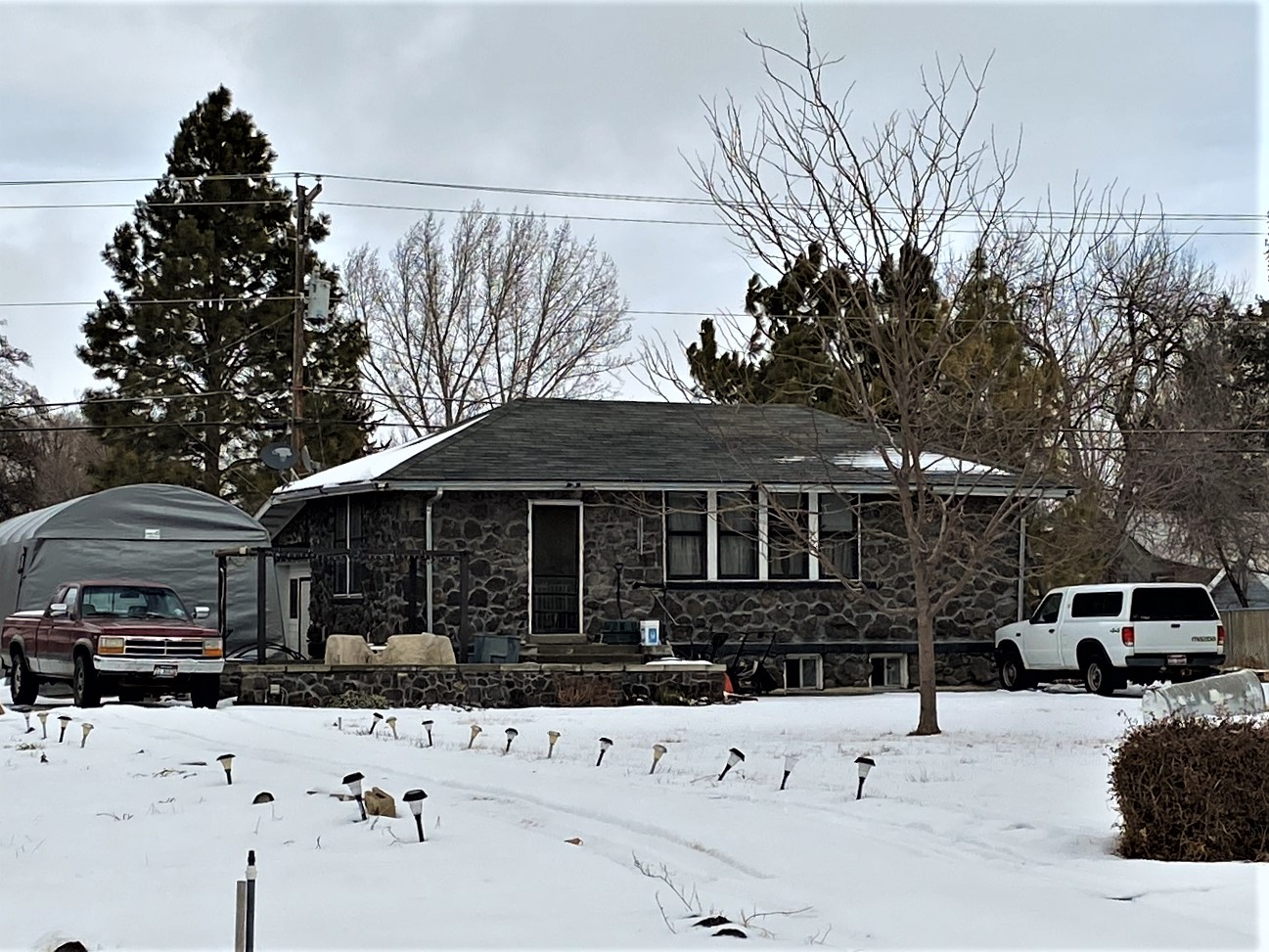
The J. O. Lee Honey House
