= Edgar Augustus Jerome Johnson =

American economist

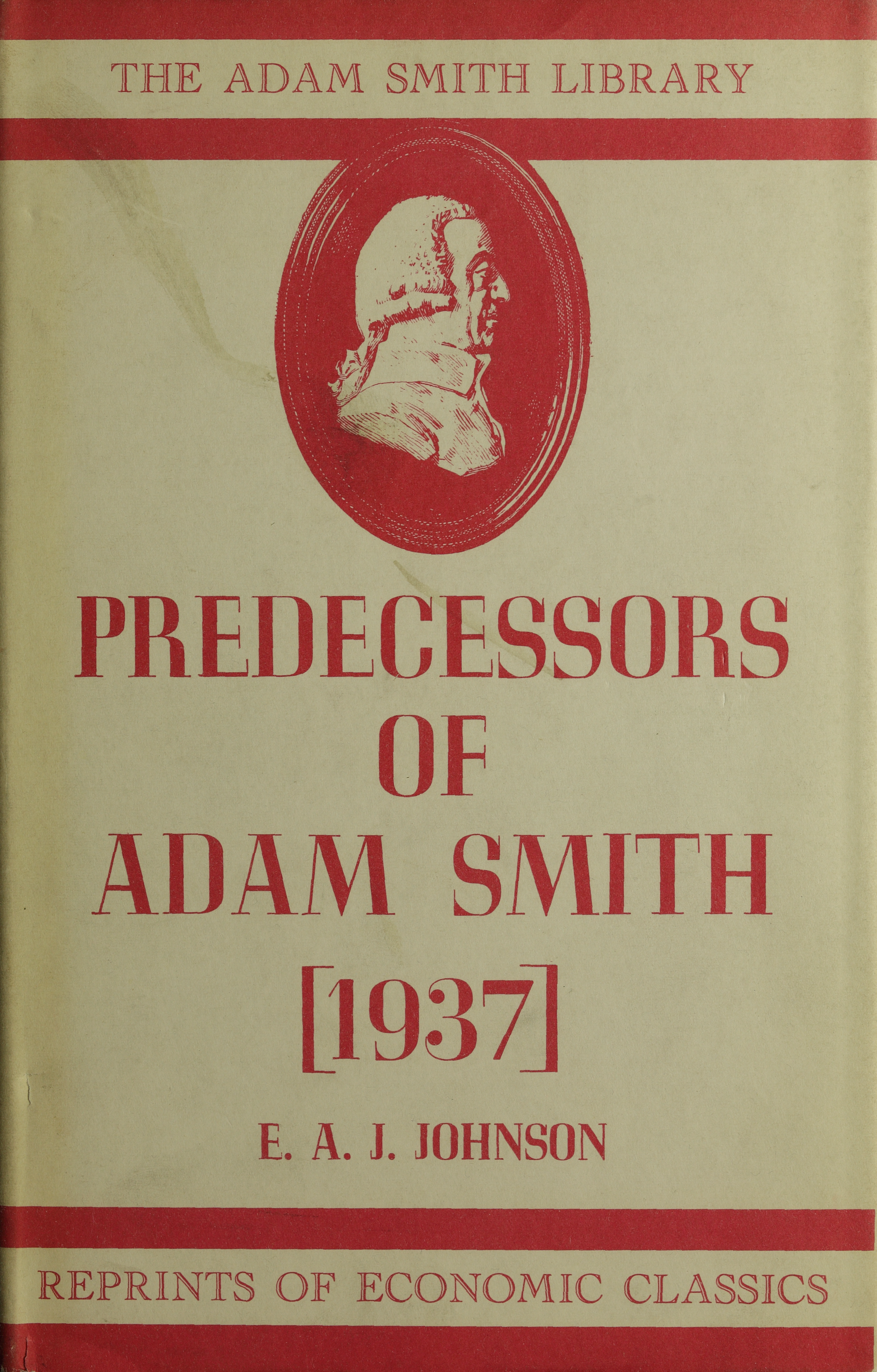
Predecessors of Adam Smith, title page, 1965 edition

Edgar Augustus Jerome Johnson (1900–1972) was an American economist and a professor of economic history at the School of Advanced International Studies at Johns Hopkins University. He served as consultant to the Indian National Council of Applied Economic Research, consultant to the American International Development (A.I.D) mission to India, deputy director of the U.S. aid mission to Yugoslavia, economic advisor to the Economic Cooperation Administration mission to Greece, director of the Korean ECA program, and Minister of Commerce, Civil Governor, and chief adviser, successively, for the interim government of Korea. During World War II, he was chief, Economics Branch, Allied Land Forces, Norway, and deputy chief, Supply Control, U.S. forces in Germany. He taught at ten American universities and lectured at over a dozen foreign universities.

He received his BS at the University of Illinois and his MA and PHD at Harvard University.

== Works ==
- American Economic Thought in the Seventeenth Century. New York: Russell & Russell. 1961 – via Internet Archive.
- Predecessors of Adam Smith: The Growth of British Economic Thought. Reprints of Economic Classics. New York: Augustus M. Kelley. 1965 [1937]. OCLC 310507 – via Internet Archive.
- American Imperialism in the Image of Peer Gynt: Memoirs of a Professor-Bureaucrat. University of Minnesota Press. 1971. ISBN 978-0-8166-5796-4. OCLC 473438881 – via Internet Archive.
