= Hazelton Presbyterian Church =

Historic church in Idaho, United States

- U.S. National Register of Historic Places
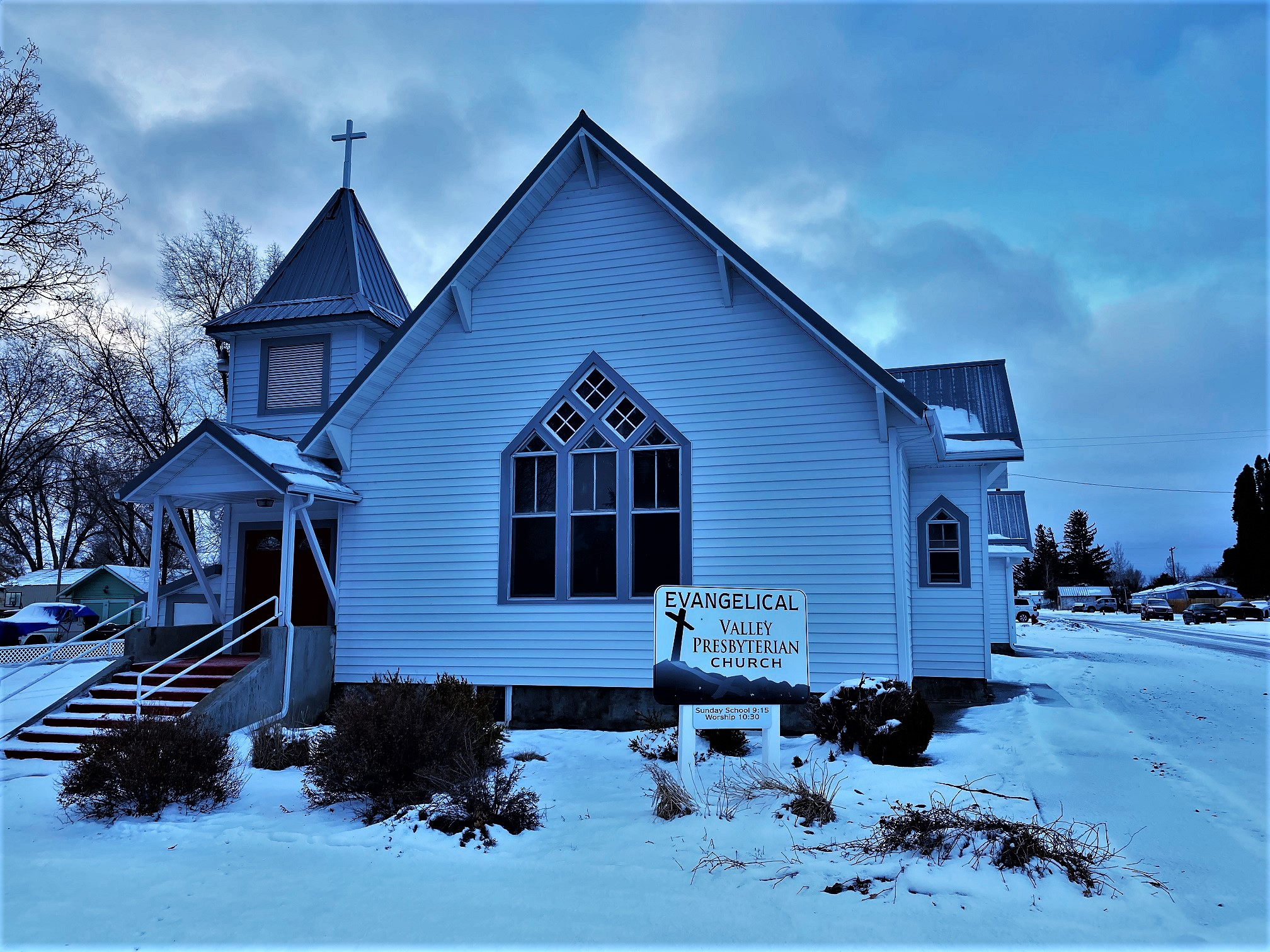

- Location within Idaho Location within the United States
- Location: 310 Park Ave. Hazelton, Idaho
- Coordinates: 42°35′42″N 114°8′5″W
- Area: less than one acre
- Built: 1916, 1940, 1989
- Architect: Cooper, M.A.
- Architectural style: Gothic
- NRHP reference No.: 91000459
- Added to NRHP: April 26, 1991

Hazelton Presbyterian Church (also known as Valley Presbyterian Church) is a historic Presbyterian church at 310 Park Avenue in Hazelton, Idaho. The church building was added to the National Register of Historic Places in 1991.

It is a one-story Gothic-style church built in 1916, with compatible additions built in 1940 and 1989.

Its NRHP nomination states:

Its historic significance is achieved through its association with the settlement and early years of Hazelton and the area known as the "northside" or "first segregation." It represents the optimism and commitment to stability exhibited by early residents as they struggled to transform a desert into one of the most successful reclamation projects in the country. It is architecturally significant as a modest example of an ecclesiastical type that was adopted by most Protestant religions from 1880 to 1930 and can be seen in both small towns and in more elaborate versions in large cities.
