= Hazelton, Idaho =

- City
- Location of Hazelton in Jerome County, Idaho
- Coordinates: 42°35′43″N 114°08′12″W
- Country: United States
- State: Idaho
- County: Jerome

Area
  - Total: 0.37 sq mi (0.96 km^{2})
  - Land: 0.36 sq mi (0.93 km^{2})
  - Water: 0.012 sq mi (0.03 km^{2})
- Elevation: 4,085 ft (1,245 m)

Population (2020)
  - Total: 803
  - Density: 2,282.6/sq mi (881.33/km^{2})
- Time zone: UTC-7 (Mountain (MST))
  - Summer (DST): UTC-6 (MDT)
- ZIP code: 83335
- Area code: 208
- FIPS code: 16-36730
- GNIS feature ID: 2410725
- Website: www.cityofhazelton.com

Hazelton is a city in Jerome County, Idaho, United States. The population was 807 at the 2020 census. It is part of the Twin Falls, Idaho Micropolitan Statistical Area.

== Geography ==
According to the United States Census Bureau, the city has a total area of 0.38 square miles (0.98 km^{2}), of which, 0.37 square miles (0.96 km^{2}) is land and 0.01 square miles (0.03 km^{2}) is water.

== Demographics ==
Historical population
Census	Pop.	Note	%±
1920	295		—
1930	388		31.5%
1940	417		7.5%
1950	429		2.9%
1960	433		0.9%
1970	396		−8.5%
1980	496		25.3%
1990	394		−20.6%
2000	687		74.4%
2010	753		9.6%
2020	803		6.6%
2019 (est.)	821		9.0%
U.S. Decennial Census

=== 2010 census ===
As of the census of 2010, there were 753 people, 254 households, and 187 families residing in the city. The population density was 2,035.1 inhabitants per square mile (785.8/km^{2}). There were 272 housing units at an average density of 735.1 per square mile (283.8/km^{2}). The racial makeup of the city was 45.9% White, 0.1% Native American, 0.3% Asian, 2.0% from other races, and 2.7% from two or more races. Hispanic or Latino people of any race were 52.0% of the population.

There were 254 households, of which 44.9% had children under the age of 18 living with them, 59.8% were married couples living together, 10.6% had a female householder with no husband present, 3.1% had a male householder with no wife present, and 26.4% were non-families. 22.4% of all households were made up of individuals, and 11.4% had someone living alone who was 65 years of age or older. The average household size was 2.96 and the average family size was 3.56.

The median age in the city was 31.2 years. 33.6% of residents were under the age of 18; 8.9% were between the ages of 18 and 24; 24.7% were from 25 to 44; 20.8% were from 45 to 64; and 12% were 65 years of age or older. The gender makeup of the city was 50.3% male and 49.7% female.

=== 2000 census ===
As of the census of 2000, there were 687 people, 238 households, and 172 families residing in the city. The population density was 2,099.9 inhabitants per square mile (810.8/km^{2}). There were 270 housing units at an average density of 825.3 per square mile (318.7/km^{2}). The racial makeup of the city was 83.55% White, 0.87% African American, 1.31% Native American, 13.39% from other races, and 0.87% from two or more races. Hispanic or Latino people of any race were 26.64% of the population.

There were 238 households, out of which 41.2% had children under the age of 18 living with them, 58.8% were married couples living together, 9.2% had a female householder with no husband present, and 27.7% were non-families. 23.9% of all households were made up of individuals, and 15.5% had someone living alone who was 65 years of age or older. The average household size was 2.89 and the average family size was 3.53.

In the city, the population was spread out, with 34.2% under the age of 18, 8.3% from 18 to 24, 25.6% from 25 to 44, 17.2% from 45 to 64, and 14.7% who were 65 years of age or older. The median age was 32 years. For every 100 females, there were 99.1 males. For every 100 females age 18 and over, there were 100.0 males.

The median income for a household in the city was $22,596, and the median income for a family was $30,000. Males had a median income of $30,132 versus $18,125 for females. The per capita income for the city was $10,215. About 24.1% of families and 29.5% of the population were below the poverty line, including 37.7% of those under age 18 and 10.6% of those age 65 or over.

== Arts and culture ==
Historic sites include Hazelton Presbyterian Church and the Marion and Julia Kelley House.

== Education ==
Valley School is the only school in Hazelton, and consists of K-12 classrooms; it includes Valley Elementary School, Valley Middle School, and Valley High School. The 1A school features a Viking as their mascot.

== In popular culture ==
We Sagebrush Folks is a 1934 autobiography by Annie Pike Greenwood about farm life near Hazelton.

== See also ==
- National Register of Historic Places listings in Twin Falls County, Idaho
