= Historic house =

House with a notable history or of a historic nature

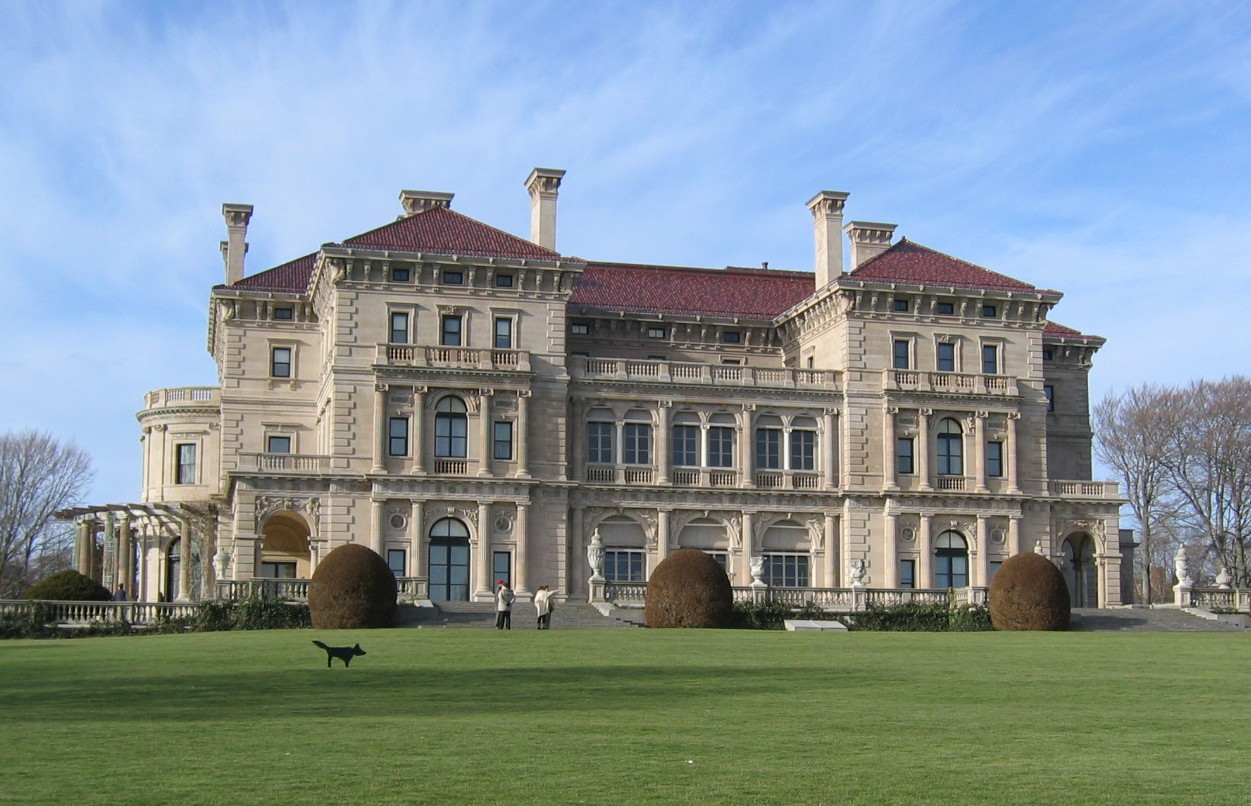
The Breakers, an American historic mansion

A historic house generally meets several criteria before being listed by an official body as "historic." Generally the building is at least a certain age, depending on the rules for the individual list. A second factor is that the building be in recognizably the same form as when it became historic. Third is a requirement that either an event of historical importance happened at the site, or that a person of historical significance was associated with the site, or that the building itself is important for its architecture or interior. Many historic houses are also considered museums and retain permanent collections that help tell the story of their house and the era.

== Background ==
Houses were first thought of as historic rather than just old or interesting, during the early nineteenth century. Government protection was first given during the late nineteenth century.

Historic homes are often eligible for special grant awards for preservation. What makes a historic home significant is often its architecture or its importance to the culture or history of the area. There are some organizations that offer services to research the history of a home and others that provide repositories for users to document the history of their homes.

Historic homes may still be inhabited, and thus should not be confused with historic house museums.

== Historic houses in the United States ==
Houses are increasingly being designated as historic in the United States as a way to resuscitate neighbourhoods and increase the economic health of surrounding urban areas. Designating a house as historic tends to increase the value of the house as well as others in the same neighbourhood. This can result in increased development of nearby properties, creating a ripple effect that spreads to surrounding neighbourhoods. In some cases, fees are assessed of homeowners during the designation process, so there is not necessarily an economic benefit to doing so.

== See also ==
- Canadian Register of Historic Places – an on-line directory of historic sites in Canada that are formally recognized for their heritage value by a federal, provincial, territorial and/or municipal authority
- Historic Houses Association – non-profit organisation that represents 1,600 privately owned historic country houses, castles and gardens throughout the United Kingdom
- List of historic houses
- List of Irish towns with a Market House
- National Historic Preservation Act of 1966 – U.S. legislation intended to preserve historical and archaeological sites in the United States
- National Register of Historic Places – the Federal government of the United States' official list of districts, sites, buildings, structures, and objects deemed worthy of preservation
- The Georgian Group
