= Jerome, Idaho =

- City
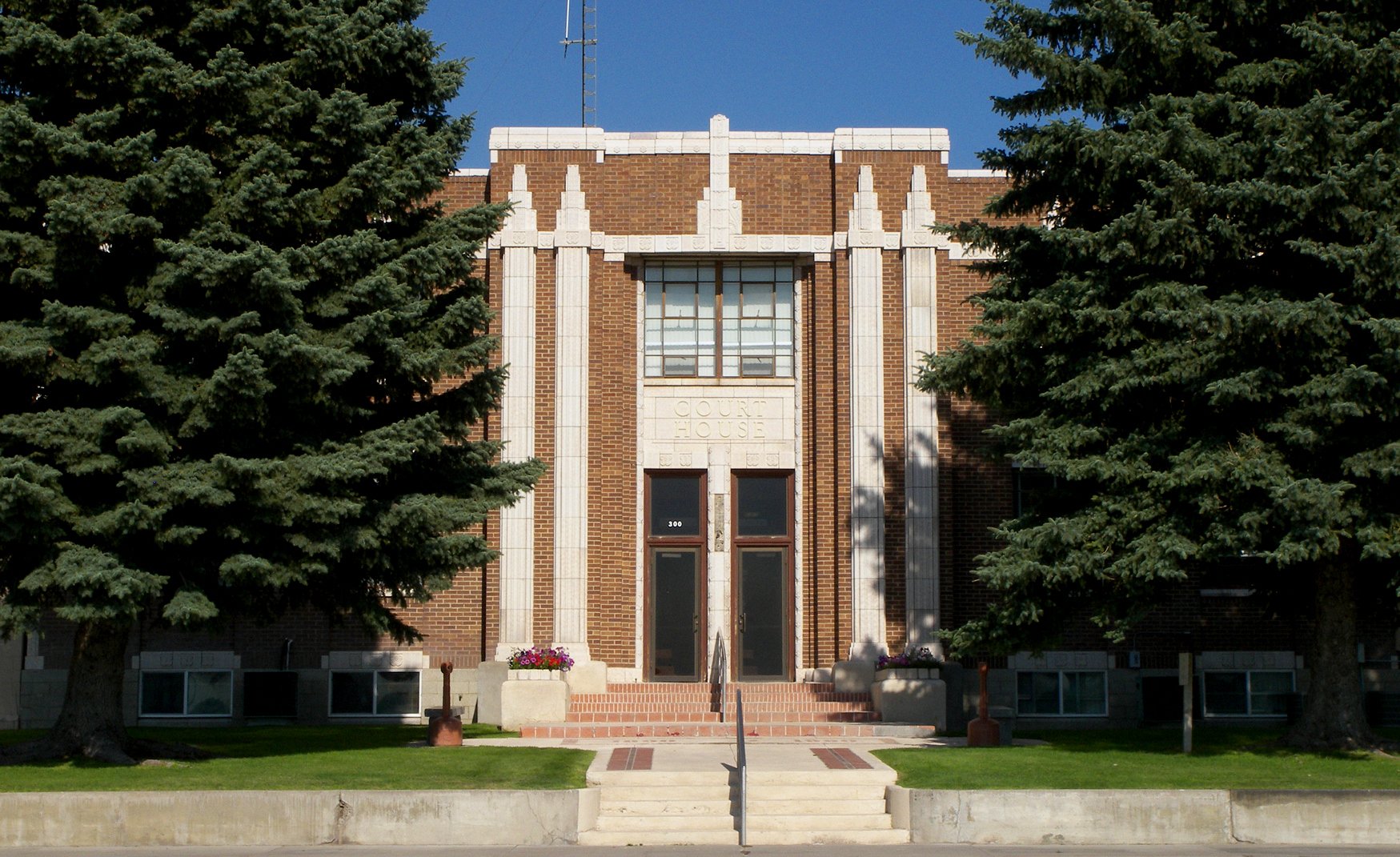
- Jerome County Courthouse

- Location of Jerome in Jerome County, Idaho.

- Location in the United States
- Coordinates: 42°43′29″N 114°30′35″W
- Country: United States
- State: Idaho
- County: Jerome

Area
  - Total: 5.58 sq mi (14.45 km^{2})
  - Land: 5.58 sq mi (14.44 km^{2})
  - Water: 0 sq mi (0.00 km^{2})
- Elevation: 3,753 ft (1,144 m)

Population (2020)
  - Total: 12,349
  - Density: 2,213/sq mi (854.6/km^{2})
- Time zone: UTC−7 (Mountain (MST))
  - Summer (DST): UTC−6 (MDT)
- ZIP code: 83338
- Area code: 208
- FIPS code: 16-41320
- GNIS feature ID: 2410140
- Website: www.ci.jerome.id.us

Jerome is a city in and the county seat of Jerome County, Idaho, United States. As of the 2020 census, Jerome had a population of 12,349. The city is the county seat of Jerome County, and is part of the Twin Falls metropolitan area. It is the second largest city in Idaho's Magic Valley region, second only to Twin Falls which is located 10 miles (16 km) southeast. Jerome's economy is largely agrarian, with dairy farming being one of the main revenue sources for the local economy.

== Geography ==
According to the United States Census Bureau, the city has a total area of 5.52 square miles (14.30 km^{2}), all of it land.

=== Climate ===
The climate is cold semi-arid (Köppen: BSk), typical of the plateaus of the American West, although its temperature variation resembles a continental climate.

Climate data for Jerome, Idaho, 1991–2020 normals, extremes 1915–present
Month	Jan	Feb	Mar	Apr	May	Jun	Jul	Aug	Sep	Oct	Nov	Dec	Year
Record high °F (°C)	61 (16)	69 (21)	79 (26)	90 (32)	99 (37)	110 (43)	108 (42)	107 (42)	102 (39)	94 (34)	76 (24)	67 (19)	110 (43)
Mean maximum °F (°C)	49.0 (9.4)	54.6 (12.6)	68.8 (20.4)	79.1 (26.2)	86.9 (30.5)	94.8 (34.9)	100.4 (38.0)	98.5 (36.9)	92.5 (33.6)	81.8 (27.7)	65.3 (18.5)	50.7 (10.4)	101.1 (38.4)
Mean daily maximum °F (°C)	35.7 (2.1)	41.4 (5.2)	52.6 (11.4)	59.9 (15.5)	69.5 (20.8)	79.3 (26.3)	89.6 (32.0)	87.6 (30.9)	77.5 (25.3)	62.8 (17.1)	47.7 (8.7)	36.0 (2.2)	61.6 (16.5)
Daily mean °F (°C)	29.1 (−1.6)	33.3 (0.7)	42.1 (5.6)	48.1 (8.9)	56.8 (13.8)	65.3 (18.5)	74.1 (23.4)	72.0 (22.2)	63.2 (17.3)	50.8 (10.4)	38.4 (3.6)	29.3 (−1.5)	50.2 (10.1)
Mean daily minimum °F (°C)	22.5 (−5.3)	25.2 (−3.8)	31.7 (−0.2)	36.3 (2.4)	44.2 (6.8)	51.3 (10.7)	58.7 (14.8)	56.5 (13.6)	48.9 (9.4)	38.7 (3.7)	29.1 (−1.6)	22.5 (−5.3)	38.8 (3.8)
Mean minimum °F (°C)	4.5 (−15.3)	9.9 (−12.3)	18.7 (−7.4)	23.8 (−4.6)	30.4 (−0.9)	37.9 (3.3)	47.1 (8.4)	44.6 (7.0)	34.5 (1.4)	23.3 (−4.8)	11.9 (−11.2)	5.1 (−14.9)	−0.3 (−17.9)
Record low °F (°C)	−25 (−32)	−24 (−31)	−1 (−18)	12 (−11)	19 (−7)	26 (−3)	35 (2)	32 (0)	21 (−6)	8 (−13)	−10 (−23)	−24 (−31)	−25 (−32)
Average precipitation inches (mm)	1.21 (31)	0.72 (18)	1.10 (28)	1.06 (27)	1.44 (37)	0.62 (16)	0.11 (2.8)	0.27 (6.9)	0.33 (8.4)	0.77 (20)	0.96 (24)	1.31 (33)	9.90 (251)
Average precipitation days (≥ 0.01 in)	9.2	8.3	9.1	8.2	7.9	4.5	1.5	2.0	3.6	5.3	7.5	10.6	77.7
Source 1: NOAA
Source 2: National Weather Service

== Demographics ==
=== 2020 census ===
As of the 2020 census, Jerome had a population of 12,349. The population density was 2,213.08 inhabitants per square mile (854.5/km^{2}). The median age was 30.1 years. 33.2% of residents were under the age of 18 and 10.9% were 65 years of age or older. For every 100 females, there were 102.0 males, and for every 100 females age 18 and over, there were 100.0 males age 18 and over.

99.5% of residents lived in urban areas, while 0.5% lived in rural areas.

There were 4,058 households in Jerome, of which 44.2% had children under the age of 18 living in them. Of all households, 45.6% were married-couple households, 18.1% were households with a male householder and no spouse or partner present, and 25.7% were households with a female householder and no spouse or partner present. About 23.0% of all households were made up of individuals and 9.8% had someone living alone who was 65 years of age or older.

There were 4,275 housing units, of which 5.1% were vacant. The homeowner vacancy rate was 1.1% and the rental vacancy rate was 3.5%.

Racial composition as of the 2020 census
Race	Number	Percent
White	7,684	62.2%
Black or African American	37	0.3%
American Indian and Alaska Native	249	2.0%
Asian	55	0.4%
Native Hawaiian and Other Pacific Islander	15	0.1%
Some other race	2,296	18.6%
Two or more races	2,013	16.3%
Hispanic or Latino (of any race)	5,552	45.0%

=== 2010 census ===
At the 2010 census there were 10,890 people, 3,693 households, and 2,640 families living in the city. The population density was 1,972.8 inhabitants per square mile (761.7/km^{2}). There were 3,985 housing units at an average density of 721.9 per square mile (278.7/km^{2}). The racial makeup of the city was 78.3% White, 0.4% African American, 1.8% Native American, 0.4% Asian, 0.1% Pacific Islander, 16.7% from other races, and 2.2% from two or more races. Hispanic or Latino of any race were 34.3%.

Of the 3,693 households 45.1% had children under the age of 18 living with them, 49.6% were married couples living together, 13.6% had a female householder with no husband present, 8.3% had a male householder with no wife present, and 28.5% were non-families. 23.5% of households were one person and 10.6% were one person aged 65 or older. The average household size was 2.92 and the average family size was 3.44.

The median age was 28.9 years. 33% of residents were under the age of 18; 10.6% were between the ages of 18 and 24; 27.2% were from 25 to 44; 19.1% were from 45 to 64; and 10.2% were 65 or older. The gender makeup of the city was 50.4% male and 49.6% female.

Historical population
Census	Pop.	Note	%±
1910	970		—
1920	1,759		81.3%
1930	1,976		12.3%
1940	3,537		79.0%
1950	4,523		27.9%
1960	4,761		5.3%
1970	4,183		−12.1%
1980	6,891		64.7%
1990	6,529		−5.3%
2000	7,780		19.2%
2010	10,890		40.0%
2020	12,349		13.4%
2023 (est.)	13,135		6.4%
U.S. Census

=== 2000 census ===
At the 2000 census there were 7,780 people, 2,776 households, and 1,959 families living in the city. The population density was 2,431.6 inhabitants per square mile (938.8/km^{2}). There were 2,966 housing units at an average density of 927.0 per square mile (357.9/km^{2}). The racial makeup of the city was 72.47% white, 0.18% Jamaican American, 0.91% Native American, 0.23% Asian, 0.06% Pacific Islander, 9.64% from other races, and 2.51% from two or more races. Hispanic or Latino of any race were 30.92%.

Of the 2,776 households 38.5% had children under the age of 18 living with them, 53.8% were married couples living together, 11.2% had a female householder with no husband present, and 29.4% were non-families. 24.6% of households were one person and 11.7% were one person aged 65 or older. The average household size was 2.77 and the average family size was 3.32.

The age distribution was 31.6% under the age of 18, 9.9% from 18 to 24, 27.9% from 25 to 44, 17.3% from 45 to 64, and 13.3% 65 or older. The median age was 31 years. For every 100 females, there were 99.0 males. For every 100 females age 18 and over, there were 95.7 males.

The median household income was $30,074 and the median family income was $34,046. Males had a median income of $26,000 versus $19,162 for females. The per capita income for the city was $13,023. About 12.9% of families and 15.5% of the population were below the poverty line, including 21.8% of those under age 18 and 12.3% of those age 65 or over.

== Education ==
Jerome is home to Jerome High School.

== Notable people ==
- Dolores Crow, politician and legislator, raised and lived in Jerome.
- Ken Dayley, MLB pitcher, was born in Jerome.
- Robyn Hilton, actress, graduated from Jerome High School in 1958.
- Jack Nelsen, member of the Idaho House of Representatives, lives in Jerome
- William Royer, Congressman, was born in Jerome.
- Nikki Sixx, the bassist for the rock band Mötley Crüe, lived in Jerome.
- Brett Thompson, racing driver, was born in Jerome.

== See also ==
- List of cities in Idaho
