= National Register of Historic Places listings in Clark County, Idaho =

Location of Clark County in Idaho

This is a list of the National Register of Historic Places listings in Clark County, Idaho.

This is intended to be a complete list of the properties on the National Register of Historic Places in Clark County, Idaho, United States. Latitude and longitude coordinates are provided for many National Register properties and districts; these locations may be seen together in a map.

There are 4 properties listed on the National Register in the county, including 1 National Historic Landmark. More may be added; properties and districts nationwide are added to the Register weekly.

This National Park Service list is complete through NPS recent listings posted May 23, 2025.

== Current listings ==
	Name on the Register	Image	Date listed	Location	City or town	Description
1	Birch Creek Rock Shelters	Birch Creek Rock Shelters	December 2, 1974 (#74000737)	Address Restricted	Blue Dome	
2	Camas Meadow Camp and Battle Sites	Camas Meadow Camp and Battle Sites	April 11, 1989 (#89001081)	East of Kilgore; 44°23′13″N 111°50′06″W	Kilgore	
3	St. James' Episcopal Mission Church	St. James' Episcopal Mission Church	May 14, 1993 (#93000387)	110 S. Reynolds St. (Old County Highway 91); 44°10′32″N 112°13′35″W	Dubois	Now Heritage Hall Museum
4	Spencer Rock House	Spencer Rock House	November 30, 1989 (#89001991)	Off U.S. Route 91 at Huntley Canyon; 44°21′50″N 112°11′19″W	Spencer	

== See also ==
- List of National Historic Landmarks in Idaho
- National Register of Historic Places listings in Idaho
