= Doughty House (disambiguation) =

Doughty House may refer to:

in the United Kingdom

- Doughty House, Richmond, London

in the United States

- George V. Doughty House and Garage, Jerome County, Idaho
- Doughty House (Mount Pleasant, Michigan)
- John Doughty House, Absecon City, New Jersey, listed on the National Register of Historic Places
