= Sugarloaf School =

- U.S. National Register of Historic Places
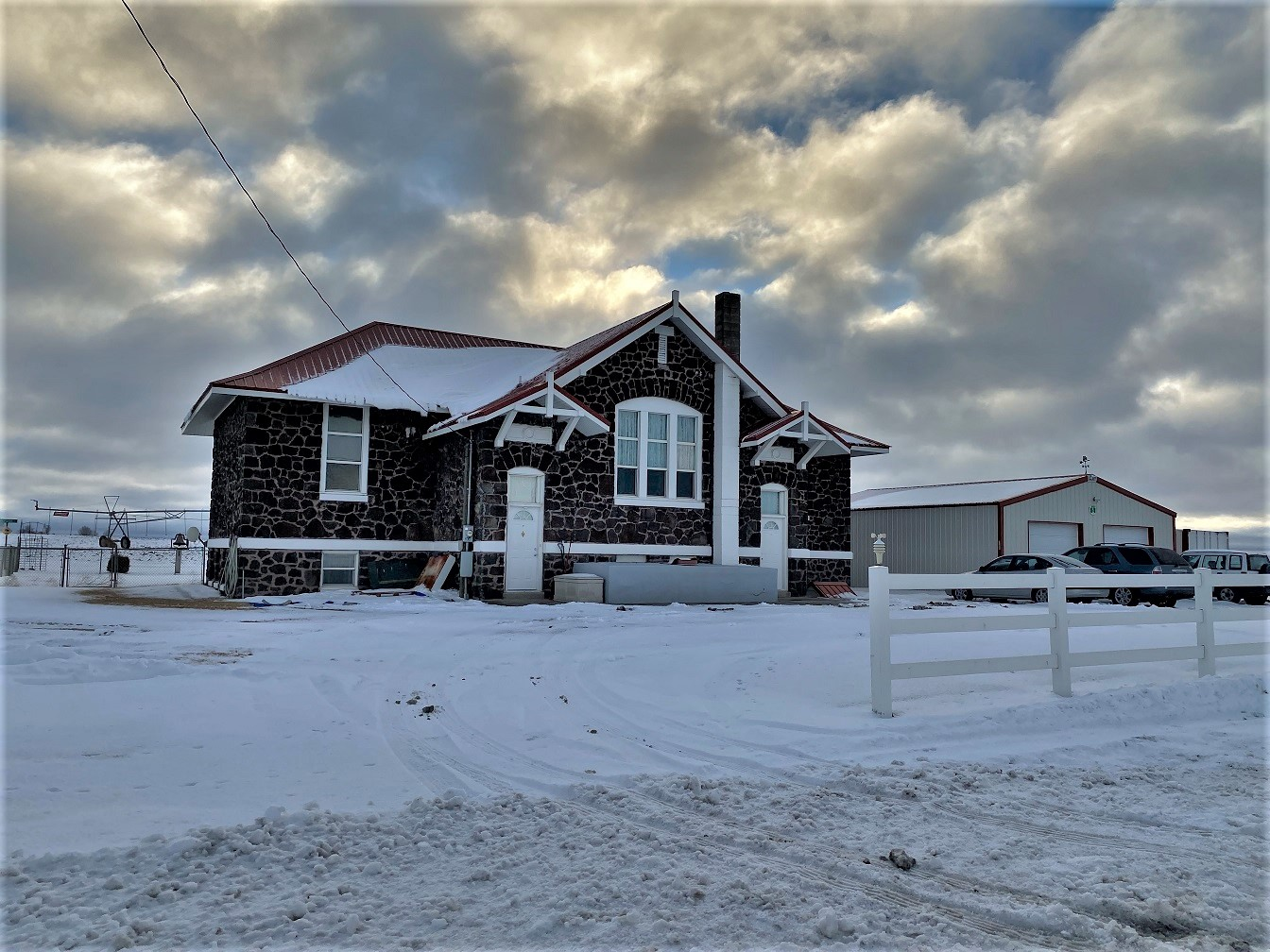

- Location within Idaho Location within the United States
- Nearest city: Jerome, Idaho
- Coordinates: 42°41′26″N 114°21′54″W
- Area: less than one acre
- Built: 1924
- Built by: H.T. Pugh
- MPS: Lava Rock Structures in South Central Idaho TR
- NRHP reference No.: 83002306
- Added to NRHP: September 8, 1983

The Sugarloaf School is a school located east of Jerome, Idaho, built from lava rock in 1924 by master stonemason H.T. Pugh and listed on the National Register of Historic Places in 1983.

== See also ==
- List of National Historic Landmarks in Idaho
- National Register of Historic Places listings in Jerome County, Idaho
