= Jerome City Pump House =

- U.S. National Register of Historic Places
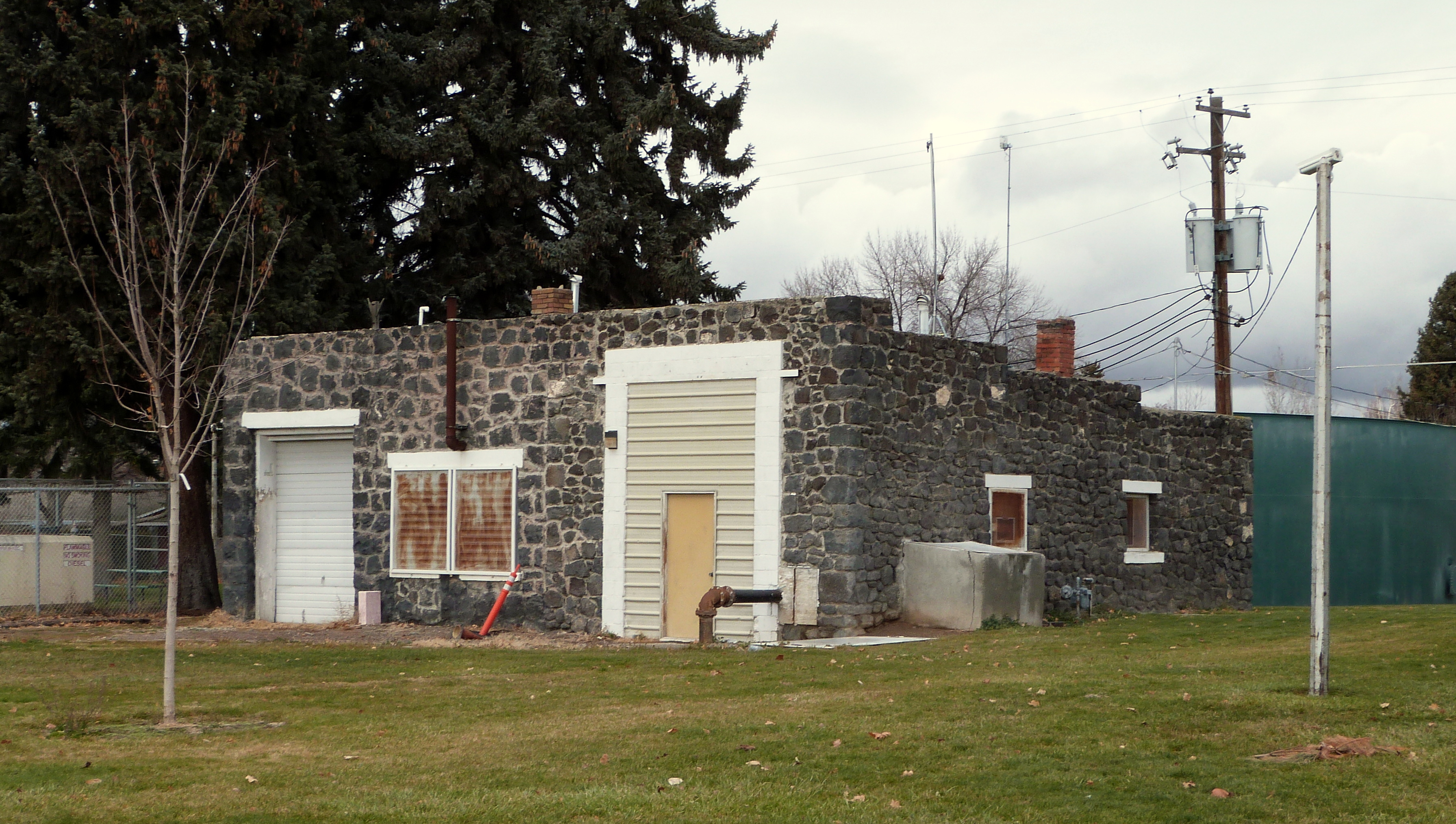
- The building's exterior in 2012

- Location within Idaho Location within the United States
- Nearest city: Jerome, Idaho
- Coordinates: 42°43′22″N 114°30′32″W
- Area: less than one acre
- Built: 1922
- Built by: Pugh, H. T.; Bennett, Ed
- MPS: Lava Rock Structures in South Central Idaho TR
- NRHP reference No.: 83002344
- Added to NRHP: September 8, 1983

The Jerome City Pump House is a water works building located near Jerome, Idaho that was built in 1922 by stonemason H.T. Pugh. It was listed on the National Register of Historic Places in 1983.

== See also ==
- List of National Historic Landmarks in Idaho
- National Register of Historic Places listings in Jerome County, Idaho
