= Thomas J. Kehrer House =

Historic house in Idaho, United States

- U.S. National Register of Historic Places
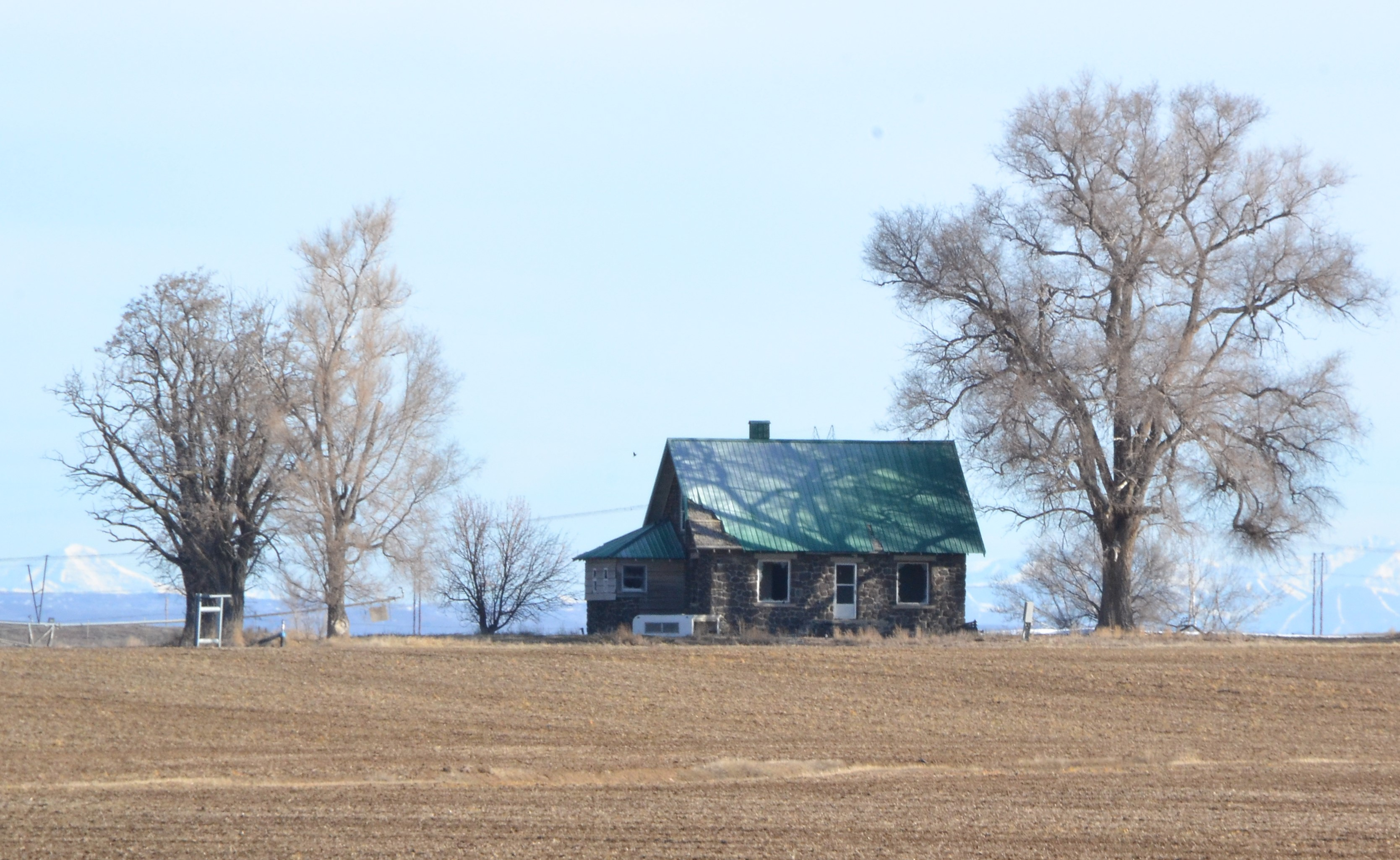

- Location within Idaho Location within the United States
- Nearest city: Jerome, Idaho
- Coordinates: 42°48′59″N 114°31′42″W
- Area: less than one acre
- Built: 1917
- Built by: Pugh, H. T.
- MPS: Lava Rock Structures in South Central Idaho TR
- NRHP reference No.: 83002342
- Added to NRHP: September 8, 1983

The Thomas J. Kehrer House is a house located near Jerome, Idaho that was listed on the National Register of Historic Places in 1983. It was built in 1917 by master stonemason H.T. Pugh.

== See also ==
- List of National Historic Landmarks in Idaho
- National Register of Historic Places listings in Jerome County, Idaho
