= E. V. Cooke House =

Historic house in Idaho, United States

- U.S. National Register of Historic Places
- Location within Idaho Location within the United States
- Nearest city: Jerome, Idaho
- Coordinates: 42°45′19″N 114°28′16″W
- Area: less than one acre
- Built: 1919
- Built by: Pugh, H. T.
- Architectural style: Bungalow
- MPS: Lava Rock Structures in South Central Idaho TR
- NRHP reference No.: 83002324
- Added to NRHP: September 8, 1983

The E. V. Cooke House is a historic house located northeast of Jerome, Idaho. The lava rock house was constructed in 1919 by stonemason H. T. Pugh. The bungalow-style home features a gable roof with exposed rafters, a gabled dormer with bracketed eaves, and a full porch. The home is similar in style to Pugh's E. C. Gleason House, which he built in Jerome the prior year.

The house was added to the National Register of Historic Places on September 8, 1983.
