= Merritt Fry Farm =

- U.S. National Register of Historic Places
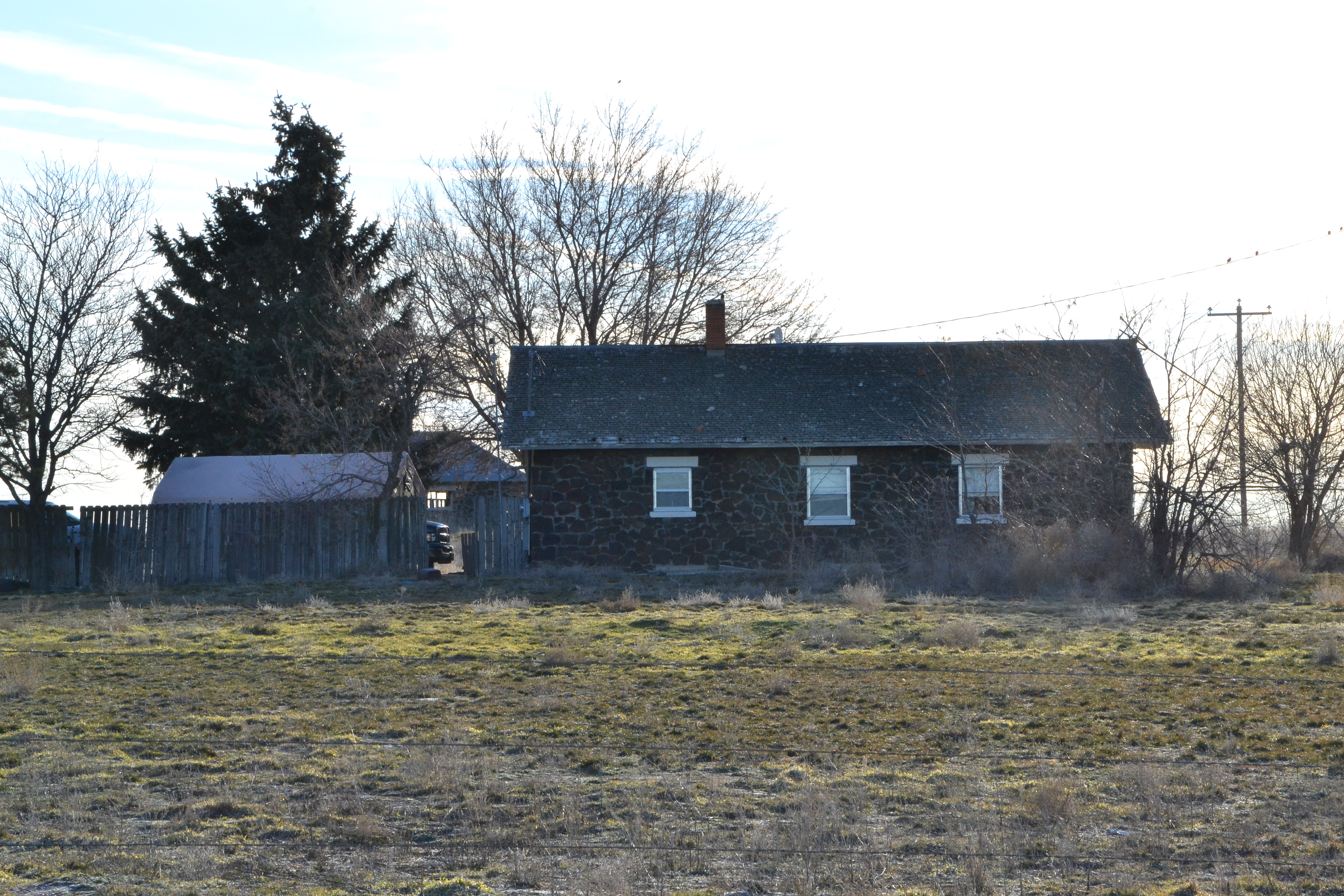

- Location within Idaho Location within the United States
- Nearest city: Jerome, Idaho
- Coordinates: 42°41′58″N 114°36′51″W
- Area: 2.5 acres (1.0 ha)
- Built: 1916
- Built by: Pugh, H. T.
- MPS: Lava Rock Structures in South Central Idaho TR
- NRHP reference No.: 83002351
- Added to NRHP: September 8, 1983

The Merritt Fry Farm is a historic farm located west of Jerome, Idaho, United States. The farm includes three stone buildings: a house, a bunkhouse, and a barn. The house and bunkhouse were built by prominent Jerome stone mason H. T. Pugh and illustrate his ability to match stones, join them with mortar, and use concrete for decoration. Farmer Merritt Fry had the bunkhouse built in 1916; it served as his temporary home until he could build a more permanent house. While farmers frequently built temporary farmhouses, Fry's is unusual in that it uses stone rather than a less sturdy material. The barn followed the bunkhouse in 1926, and Fry's permanent farmhouse was completed in 1930.

The farm was listed on the National Register of Historic Places on September 8, 1983.

== See also ==
- List of National Historic Landmarks in Idaho
- National Register of Historic Places listings in Jerome County, Idaho
