= Frank J. Brick House =

Historic house in Idaho, United States

- U.S. National Register of Historic Places
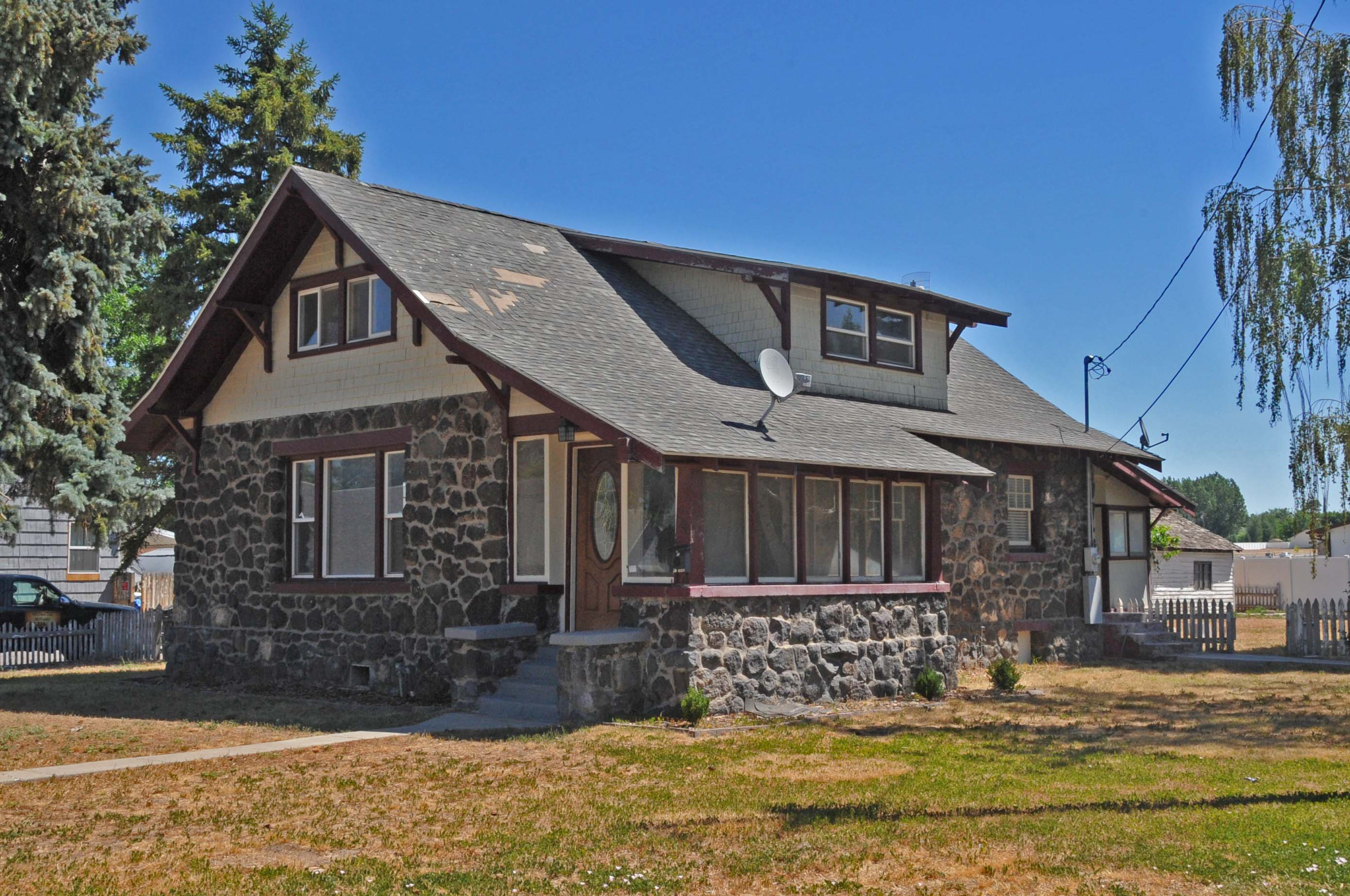

- Location within Idaho Location within the United States
- Nearest city: Jerome, Idaho
- Coordinates: 42°43′35″N 114°30′28″W
- Area: less than one acre
- Built: 1917
- Built by: Pugh, H. T.
- MPS: Lava Rock Structures in South Central Idaho TR
- NRHP reference No.: 83002322
- Added to NRHP: September 8, 1983

The Frank J. Brick House is a house located at 300 N. Fillmore St. in Jerome, Idaho. It was built by stonemason H.T. Pugh in 1917. The lava rock house is topped by a gable roof with four purlins and a dormer on the south side. The house was one of the first lava rock residences constructed in Jerome.

The house was listed on the National Register of Historic Places on September 8, 1993.

== See also ==
- List of National Historic Landmarks in Idaho
- National Register of Historic Places listings in Jerome County, Idaho
