= Keating House =

Keating House may refer to:

- Jeffery and Mary Keating House, Denver, Colorado, listed on the NRHP in downtown Denver, Colorado
- Clarence Keating House, Jerome, Idaho, listed on the NRHP in Jerome County, Idaho
- Keating House (Centreville, Maryland), listed on the National Register of Historic Places (NRHP)
