= Don Tooley House =

Historic house in Idaho, United States

- U.S. National Register of Historic Places
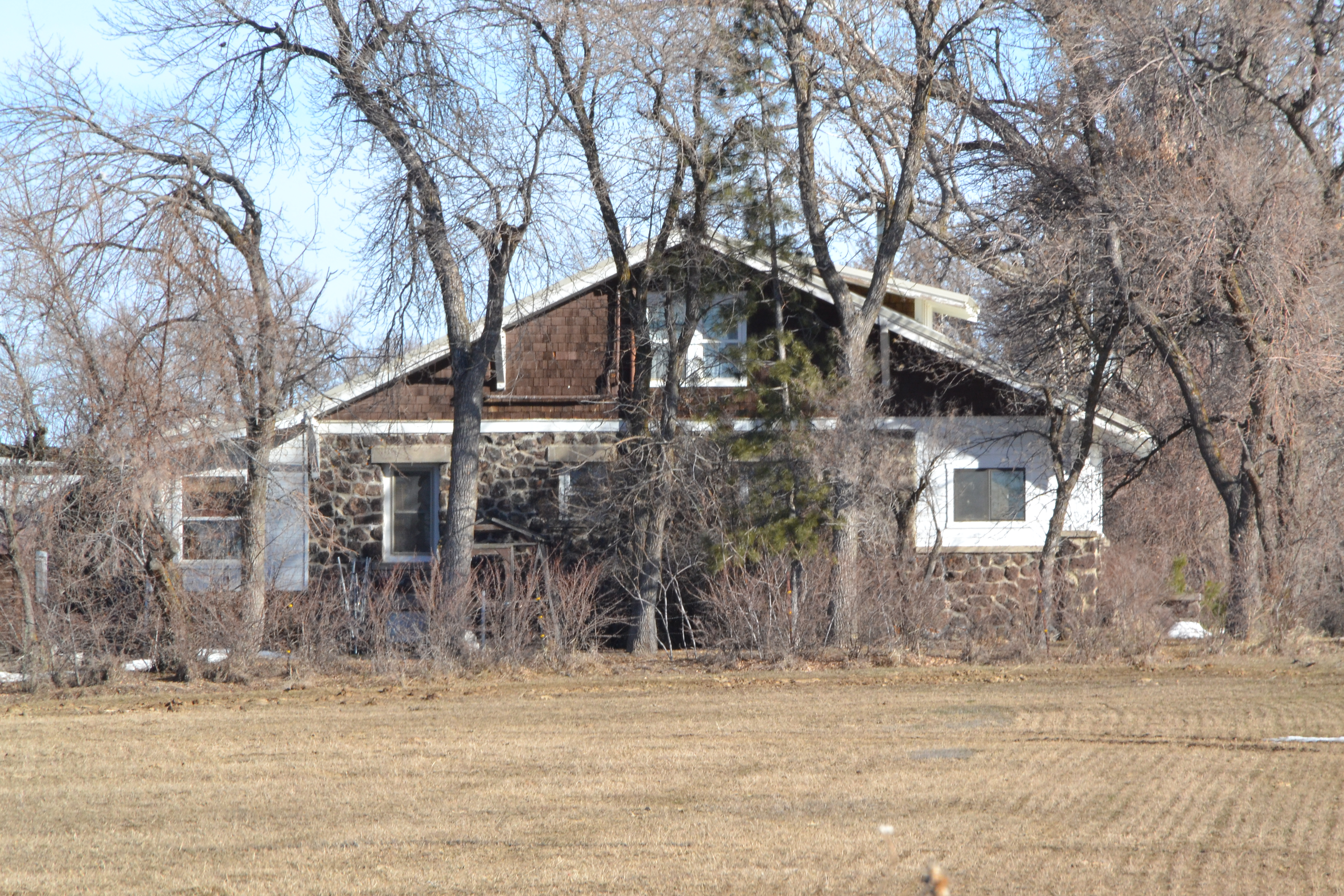

- Location within Idaho Location within the United States
- Nearest city: Jerome, Idaho
- Coordinates: 42°46′35″N 114°28′30″W
- Area: less than one acre
- Built: 1922
- Built by: Pugh, H. T.; Hadam, John
- Architectural style: Bungalow/Craftsman
- MPS: Lava Rock Structures in South Central Idaho TR
- NRHP reference No.: 83002308
- Added to NRHP: September 8, 1983

The Don Tooley House is a house located in Jerome, Idaho that was listed on the National Register of Historic Places in 1983. It is a work of master stonemason H.T. Pugh and of John Hadam.

== See also ==
- List of National Historic Landmarks in Idaho
- National Register of Historic Places listings in Jerome County, Idaho
