= Jessie Osborne House =

Historic house in Idaho, United States

- U.S. National Register of Historic Places
- Location within Idaho Location within the United States
- Nearest city: Jerome, Idaho
- Coordinates: 42°43′33″N 114°36′28″W
- Area: less than one acre
- Built: 1919
- Built by: H.T. Pugh, Paul Kartsky
- Architectural style: Vernacular
- MPS: Lava Rock Structures in South Central Idaho TR
- NRHP reference No.: 83002329
- Added to NRHP: September 8, 1983

The Jessie Osborne House is a house near Jerome, Idaho that was listed on the National Register of Historic Places in 1983. It is an example of the simple rectangular gable-roofed houses built on farms in this area of Idaho. It is unique in that it has not been changed, added on to or enlarged. It was built by master stonemason H.T. Pugh and by Paul Kartsky.

== See also ==
- List of National Historic Landmarks in Idaho
- National Register of Historic Places listings in Jerome County, Idaho
