= Jerome First Baptist Church =

Historic church in Idaho, United States

- U.S. National Register of Historic Places
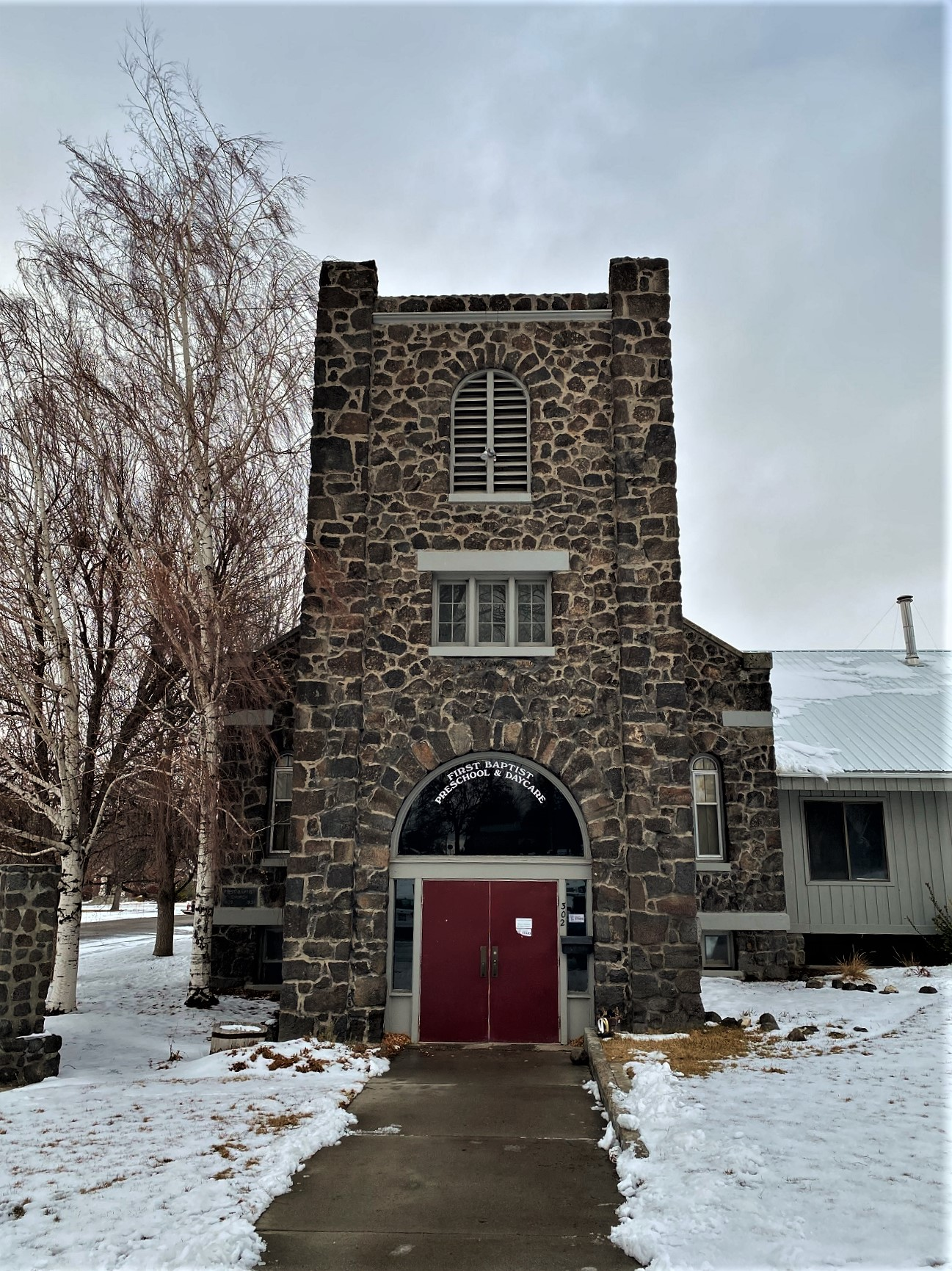

- Location within Idaho Location within the United States
- Nearest city: Jerome, Idaho
- Coordinates: 42°43′32″N 114°30′50″W
- Area: less than one acre
- Built: 1931
- Built by: Pugh, H. T.; Multiple
- Architectural style: Romanesque
- MPS: Lava Rock Structures in South Central Idaho TR
- NRHP reference No.: 83002339
- Added to NRHP: September 8, 1983

The Jerome First Baptist Church is a church located near Jerome, Idaho that was listed on the National Register of Historic Places in 1983. It was built in 1931 by master stonemason H.T. Pugh and others.

The Romanesque style church was built in 1931 and added to the Register in 1983.

== See also ==
- List of National Historic Landmarks in Idaho
- National Register of Historic Places listings in Jerome County, Idaho
