= John F. Schmerschall House =

Historic house in Jerome, Idaho, U.S.

- U.S. National Register of Historic Places
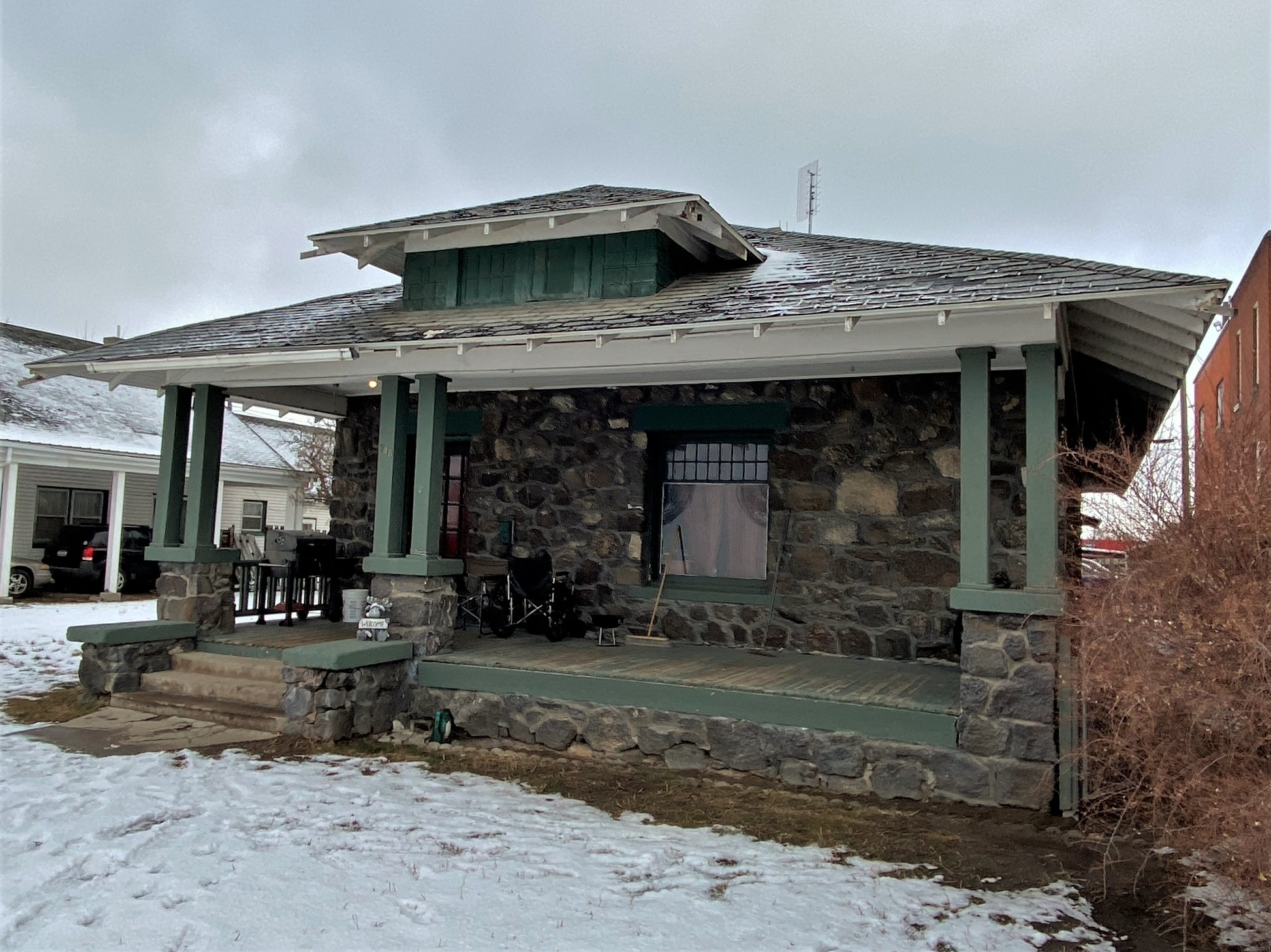

- Location within Idaho Location within the United States
- Location: 248 E. Ave. A Jerome, Idaho
- Coordinates: 42°43′27″N 114°30′53″W
- Area: less than one acre
- Built: 1917
- Built by: H.T. Pugh
- Architectural style: Bungalow/Craftsman, Colonial
- MPS: Lava Rock Structures in South Central Idaho TR
- NRHP reference No.: 83002327
- Added to NRHP: September 8, 1983

The John F. Schmerschall House is a house located in Jerome, Idaho that was listed on the National Register of Historic Places in 1983. It was built in 1917 by master stonemason H.T. Pugh.

== See also ==
- List of National Historic Landmarks in Idaho
- National Register of Historic Places listings in Jerome County, Idaho
