= Falls City School House =

- U.S. National Register of Historic Places
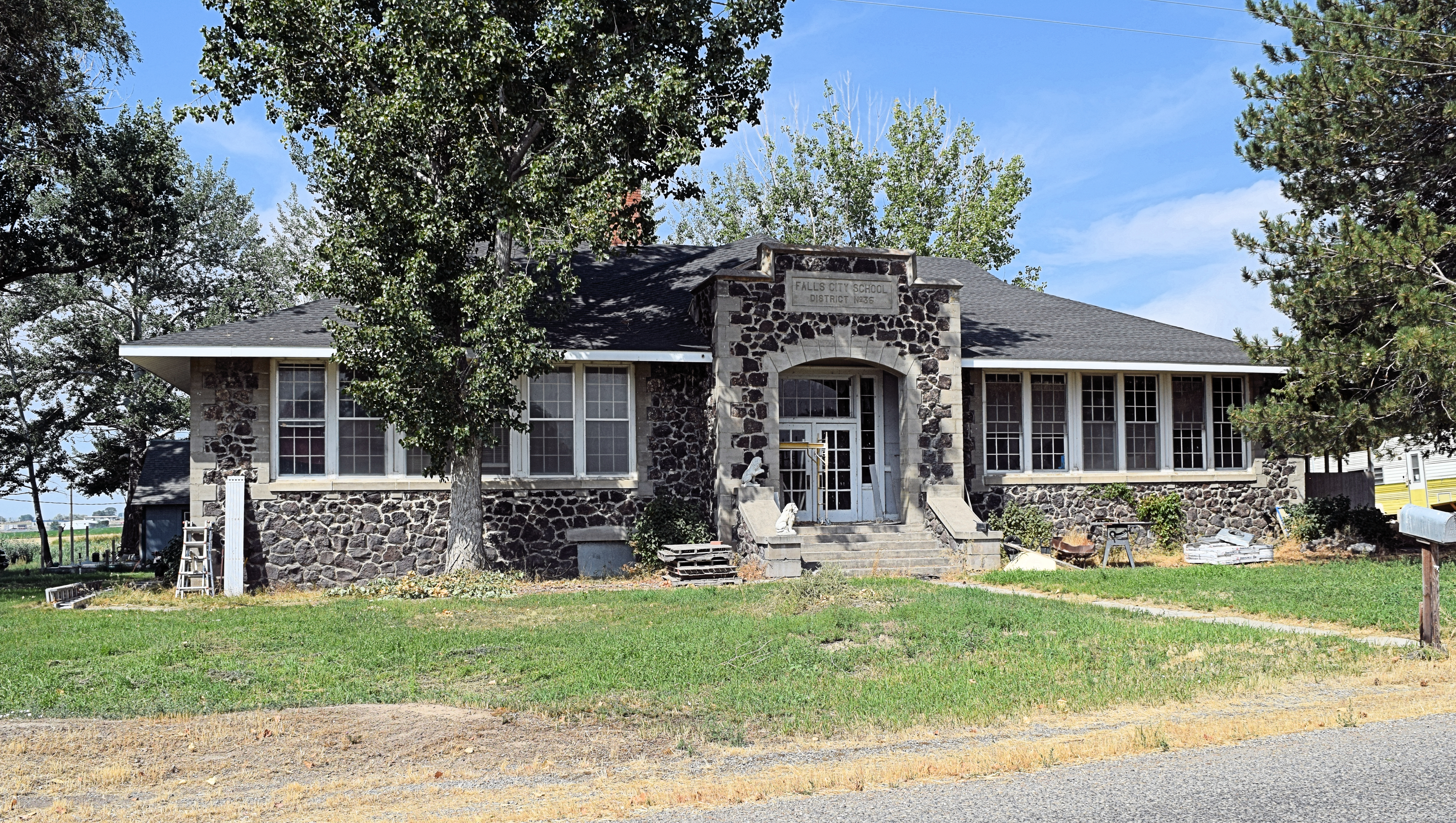

- Location within Idaho Location within the United States
- Nearest city: Jerome, Idaho
- Coordinates: 42°40′51″N 114°25′24″W
- Area: less than one acre
- Built: 1919
- Built by: Pugh, H. T.; Wulff, Maurice
- MPS: Lava Rock Structures in South Central Idaho TR
- NRHP reference No.: 83002352
- Added to NRHP: September 8, 1983

The Falls City School House is a historic schoolhouse located 3 miles (4.8 km) south and 5 miles (8.0 km) east of Jerome, Idaho. The schoolhouse was built by stonemason H.T. Pugh in 1919; it is one of four schoolhouses built by Pugh. The one-story building has a hipped roof with overhanging eaves. A stone false front over the entrance has a segmental arch and a concrete panel with the school's name. Pugh used concrete blocks, which he made on site, to accent the entrance and the corners of the building. The schoolhouse served Falls City School District 36 until it closed in the 1960s.

The schoolhouse was listed on the National Register of Historic Places in 1983.

== See also ==
- List of National Historic Landmarks in Idaho
- National Register of Historic Places listings in Jerome County, Idaho
