= Lulu Graves Farm =

- U.S. National Register of Historic Places
- Location within Idaho Location within the United States
- Nearest city: Jerome, Idaho
- Coordinates: 42°45′34″N 114°32′15″W
- Area: 5 acres (2.0 ha)
- Built: 1929-30
- Built by: Pugh, H. T.
- Architectural style: Bungalow/Craftsman
- MPS: Lava Rock Structures in South Central Idaho TR
- NRHP reference No.: 83002348
- Added to NRHP: September 8, 1983

The Lulu Graves Farm is a farm located in Jerome, Idaho, United States, listed on the National Register of Historic Places. The 5-acre (2.0 ha) farm includes a house, poultry house, and cattle loafing shed, all of which were built with local lava rock. Lava rock was a popular building material in south central Idaho in the late nineteenth and early twentieth centuries, and many lava rock buildings still survive in the area. The bungalow-style farmhouse was built in 1929 or 1930 by local stonemason H.T. Pugh.

The farm was added to the National Register of Historic Places on September 8, 1983.

== See also ==
- List of National Historic Landmarks in Idaho
- National Register of Historic Places listings in Jerome County, Idaho
