= Canyonside School =

- U.S. National Register of Historic Places
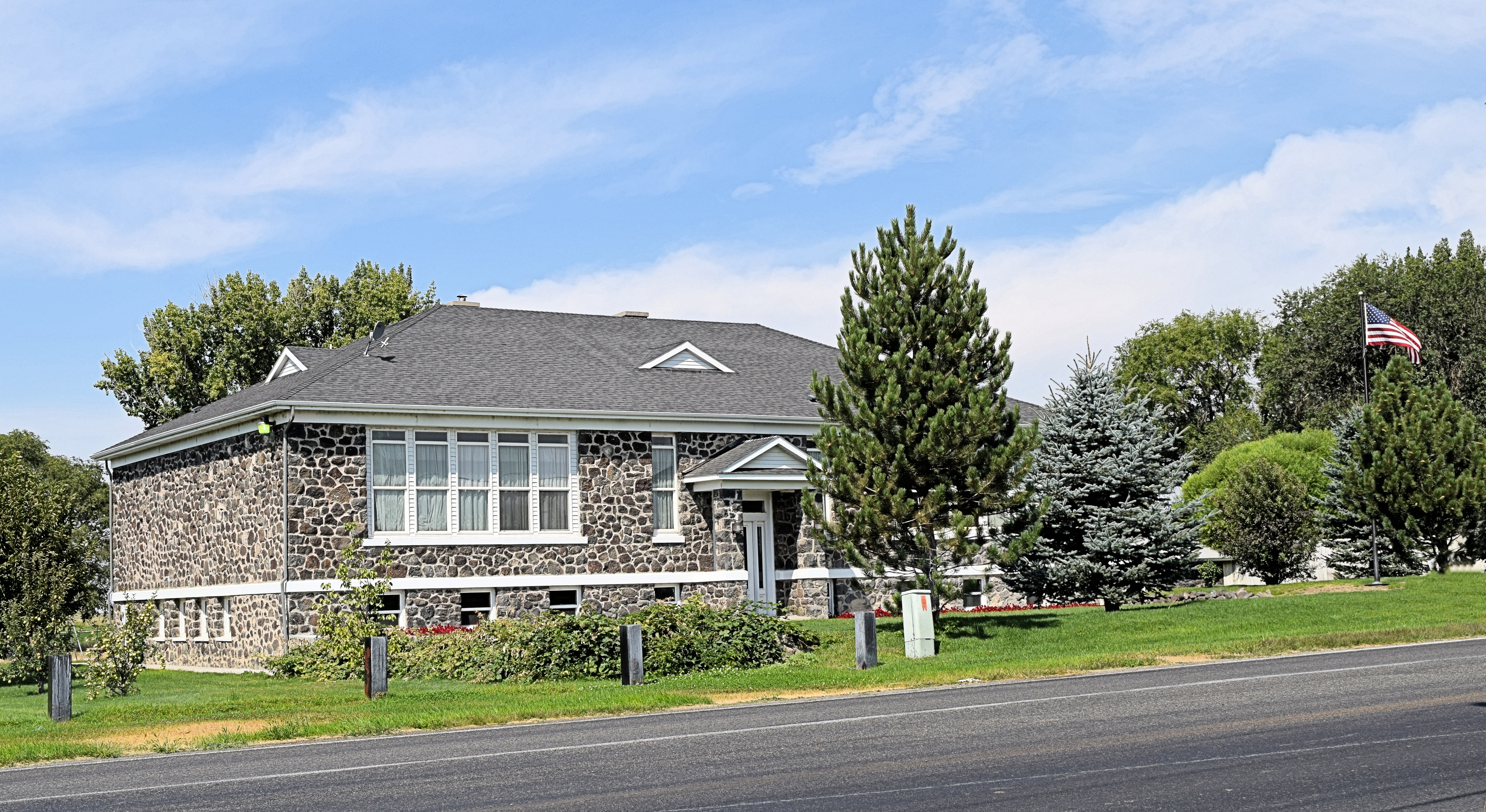
- The building's exterior in 2016

- Location within Idaho Location within the United States
- Nearest city: Jerome, Idaho
- Coordinates: 42°40′0″N 114°31′5″W
- Area: less than one acre
- Built: 1920
- Built by: Pugh, H. T.; Kartske, Paul R.
- MPS: Lava Rock Structures in South Central Idaho TR
- NRHP reference No.: 83003579
- Added to NRHP: October 14, 1983

The Canyonside School is a schoolhouse located 4 miles (6.4 km) south of Jerome, Idaho, USA. The lava rock building was constructed by the stonemason H.T. Pugh in 1920; it was one of four stone rural schools built by him. The school replaced several wooden school buildings in the area and was considered a sign of the region's agricultural prosperity, as farming in the area was profitable enough to sustain long-term investments in its educational infrastructure. The building is now a private home.

The school was listed on the National Register of Historic Places in 1983.

== See also ==
- List of National Historic Landmarks in Idaho
- National Register of Historic Places listings in Jerome County, Idaho
