= Joseph Mandl House =

Historic house in Jerome, Idaho, U.S.

- U.S. National Register of Historic Places
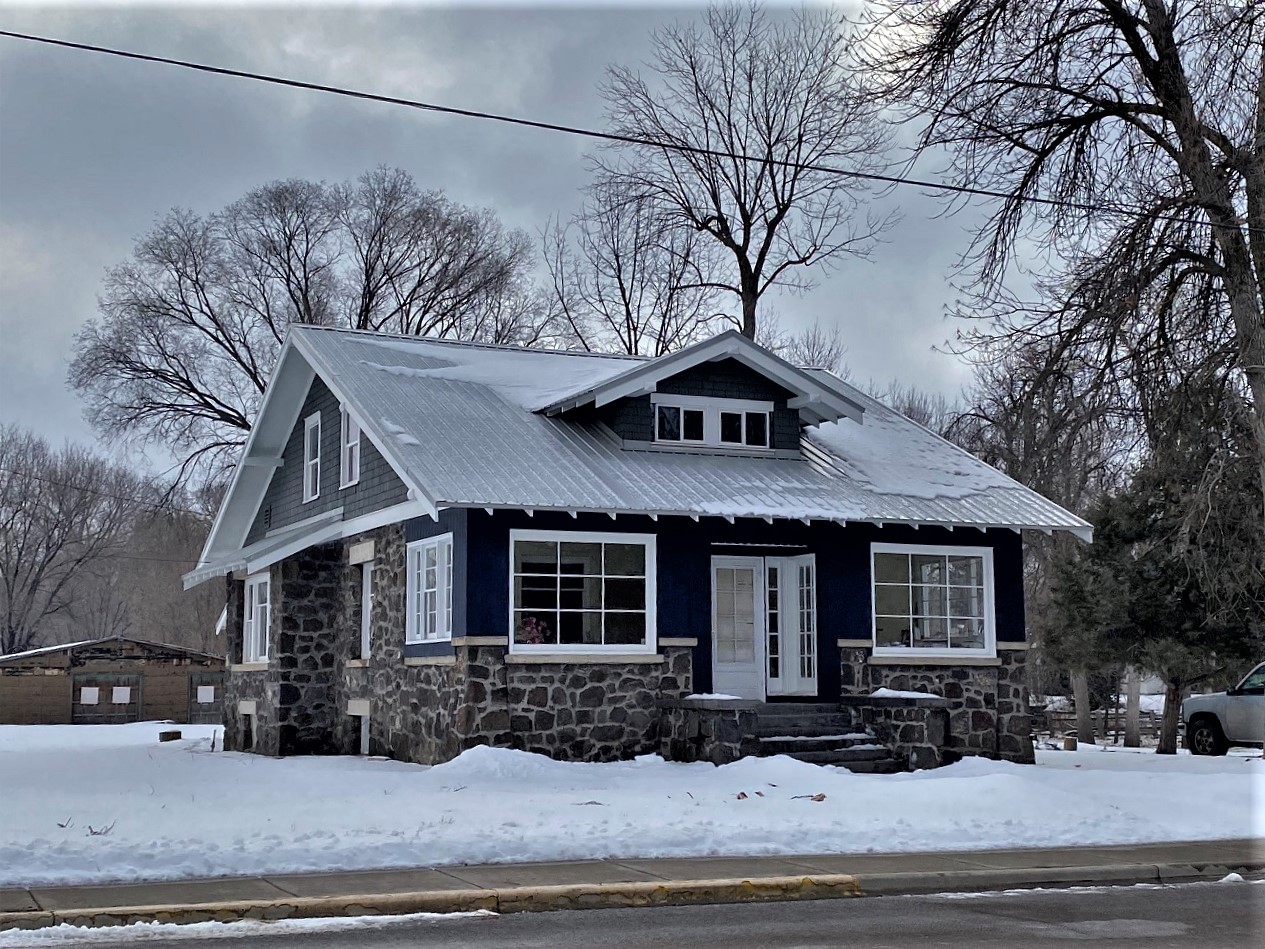

- Location within Idaho Location within the United States
- Location: 800 N. Fillmore St. Jerome, Idaho
- Coordinates: 42°43′52″N 114°30′28″W
- Area: less than one acre
- Built: 1918
- Built by: H.T. Pugh
- Architectural style: Bungalow/Craftsman
- MPS: Lava Rock Structures in South Central Idaho TR
- NRHP reference No.: 83002333
- Added to NRHP: September 8, 1983

The Joseph Mandl House is a house located at 800 N. Fillmore St. in Jerome, Idaho. It was listed on the National Register of Historic Places on September 8, 1983. It was built in 1918 by master stonemason H.T. Pugh.

== See also ==
- List of National Historic Landmarks in Idaho
- National Register of Historic Places listings in Jerome County, Idaho
