= Jerome Cooperative Creamery =

- U.S. National Register of Historic Places
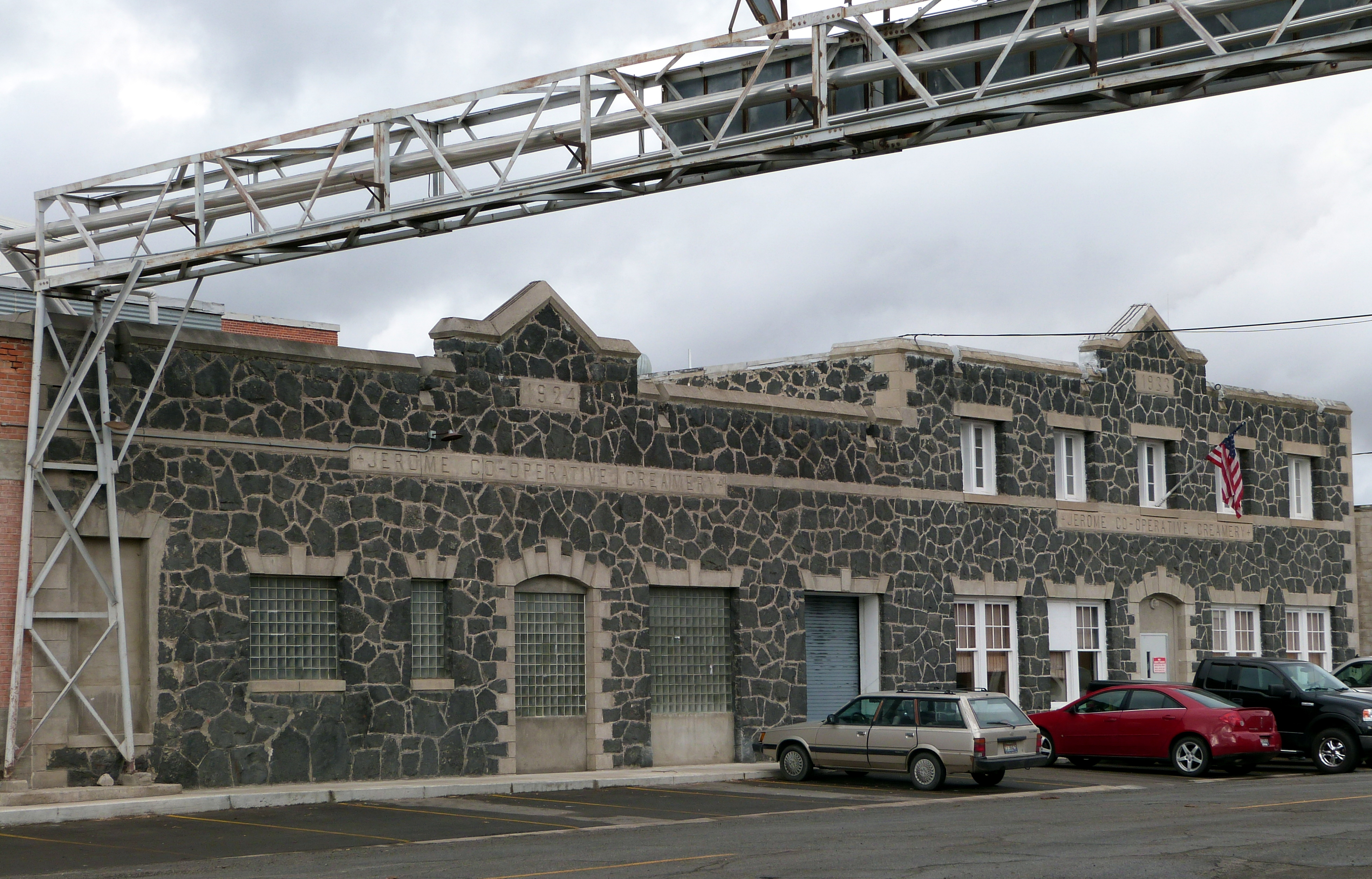
- The building's exterior in 2012

- Location within Idaho Location within the United States
- Nearest city: Jerome, Idaho
- Coordinates: 42°43′21″N 114°31′18″W
- Area: less than 1 acre (0.40 ha)
- Built: 1915, 1924, 1933
- Built by: H.T. Pugh
- MPS: Lava Rock Structures in South Central Idaho TR (64000165)
- NRHP reference No.: 83002338
- Added to NRHP: 8 September 1983

The Jerome Cooperative Creamery is a cooperative creamery and also refers to historic lava rock structures used by the creamery on Birch Street in Jerome, Idaho, United States. The structures were listed on the National Register of Historic Places on September 8, 1983. They were built in 1915, 1924, and 1933 by master stonemason H.T. Pugh who popularized the use of lava rock in the Jerome area.

In 1926, the Jerome Cooperative Creamery paid $668,356.70 (equivalent to $11,870,869 in 2024) to local farmers for butterfat. That year, the creamery produced 1,900,000 pounds (860,000 kg) of butter. In 1939, the creamery paid $1,183,378 (equivalent to $26,750,571 in 2024 dollars) for butterfat. Roy D. Smith served as the manager of the creamery for 38 years, from the early 1920s until the late 1950s.

== See also ==
- List of National Historic Landmarks in Idaho
- National Register of Historic Places listings in Jerome County, Idaho
