= Camas Meadows Battle Sites =

- U.S. National Register of Historic Places
- U.S. National Historic Landmark
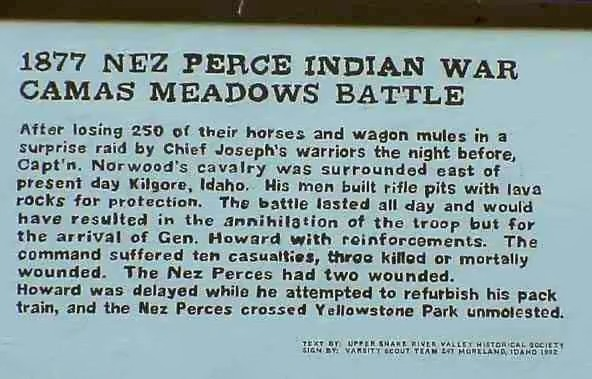
- Camas Meadows sign, Idaho, 2003

- Location within Idaho Location within the United States
- Location: Clark County, Idaho, USA
- Nearest city: Kilgore, Idaho
- Coordinates: 44°23′53″N 111°54′41″W
- Area: 80 acres (32 ha)
- Built: 1877
- NRHP reference No.: 89001081

Significant dates
- Added to NRHP: April 11, 1989
- Designated NHL: April 11, 1989

The Camas Meadows Battle Sites, also known as Camas Meadows Camp and Battle Sites, are two sites important to the Battle of Camas Creek, fought August 20, 1877 between members of the Nez Perce tribe and troops of the United States Army. The Nez Perce captured about 150 horses and mules from a campsite of the pursuing army, and for several hours besieged a detachment sent to recover them at a second site. The two sites, each about 40 acres (16 ha) in size, are about 5 miles (8.0 km) apart in Clark County, Idaho. They were designated a National Historic Landmark in 1989, and are now part of Nez Perce National Historical Park, a collection of sites important in Nez Perce history.

== Description ==
Both sites are located northeast of the town of Dubois, Idaho, off Clark County Road A-2 on the east side of Camas Creek. The Army campsite was located at approximately 44°21′11″N 111°53′06″W. Its full extent has not been identified, and is likely to extend beyond the 40 acres in the landmark designation. This area was known as Camas Meadows because the meandering streams provided water for a profusion of camas flowers in the otherwise arid environment. Most of the camp was located in between Camas Creek and Spring Creek, although the tent of General Oliver O. Howard was located on a rise to the east of Spring Creek.

The siege site is located further to the northeast, at about 44°24′45″N 111°47′41″W. Its principal features are two low knolls at which the detachment of Captain Randolph Norwood took refuge from the numerically superior Nez Perce. In this area the soldiers dug out several rifle pits, which survive.

== History ==
Several bands of Nez Perce actively resisted attempts to restrict them to reservation. This refusal, repeated after an ultimatum delivered by General Howard in May 1877, escalated into the Nez Perce War, and the now-celebrated attempt by Chief Joseph to lead a large band of non-reservation Nez Perce to Canada. After suffering defeat at the Battle of Big Hole on August 9–10, the Nez Perce traveled south, hoping to flank Howard's force and reach Canada via a route further east. Howard attempted to cut off this flanking maneuver by beating the Nez Perce to Camas Meadow, but reached that area August 19, one day after the Nez Perce had departed.

Sensing an opportunity, the Nez Perce decided to raid the army camp at Camas Meadow. After traveling half the night, they surprised the camp just before dawn, making off with 200 pack mules and several horses. General Howard sent out three columns of men in pursuit. One of these, a 50-man detachment under Captain Randolph Norwood, advanced well ahead of the other two, and became encircled by Nez Perce, digging rifle pits to escape sniper fire from all sides. After several hours, General Howard's main force arrived, and the Nez Perce retreated. The Army stopped to regroup, and lost the trail of the Indians, whose depleted force was not captured until six weeks later.

== See also ==
- List of National Historic Landmarks in Idaho
- National Register of Historic Places listings in Clark County, Idaho
