= William Weigle House and Water Tank =

- U.S. National Register of Historic Places
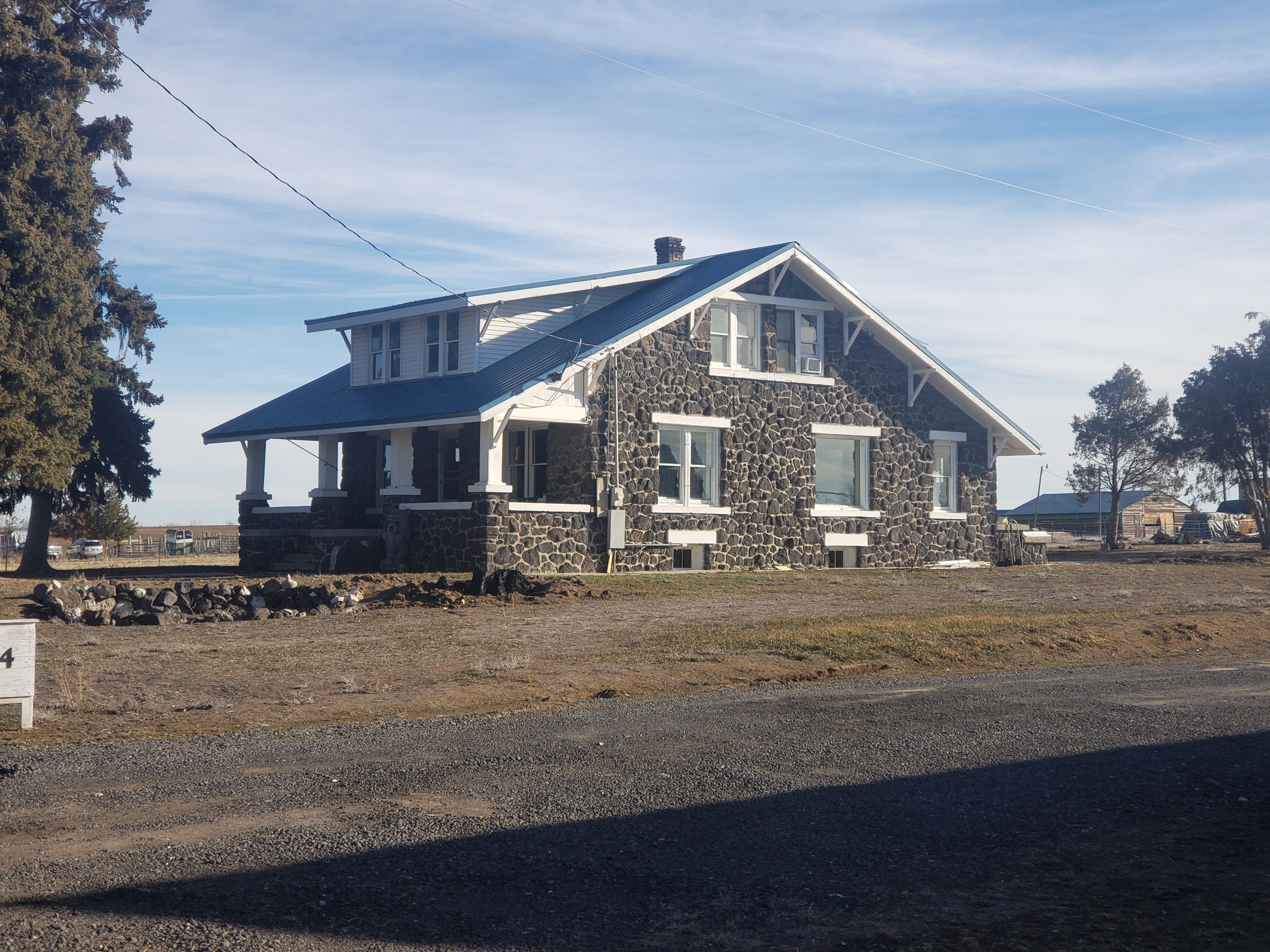

- Location within Idaho Location within the United States
- Nearest city: Jerome, Idaho
- Coordinates: 42°45′36″N 114°35′49″W
- Area: 2.5 acres (1.0 ha)
- Built: 1919
- Built by: H.T. Pugh; Leach
- Architectural style: Bungalow/craftsman
- MPS: Lava Rock Structures in South Central Idaho TR
- NRHP reference No.: 83002315
- Added to NRHP: September 8, 1983

The William Weigle House and Water Tank, near Jerome, Idaho, is a lava rock structure built in 1919. It was listed on the National Register of Historic Places in 1983.

It is a one-and-a-half-story bungalow-style house with an approximately 44 by 33 feet (13 m × 10 m) plan. It has wide eaves with exposed rafters, and a centered tall stone chimney. It includes a water tank.
