= H.T. Pugh =

Howell Trevor Pugh, known as H. T. Pugh, was a stonemason who was trained in Wales and worked primarily in Jerome, Idaho. His high quality work popularized the use of lava rock in the Jerome area, eventually including for fine residences in town. More than 20 of his works are preserved and are listed on the National Register of Historic Places.

His William Weigle House and Water Tank, built in 1919 near Jerome, includes lava rock structure.

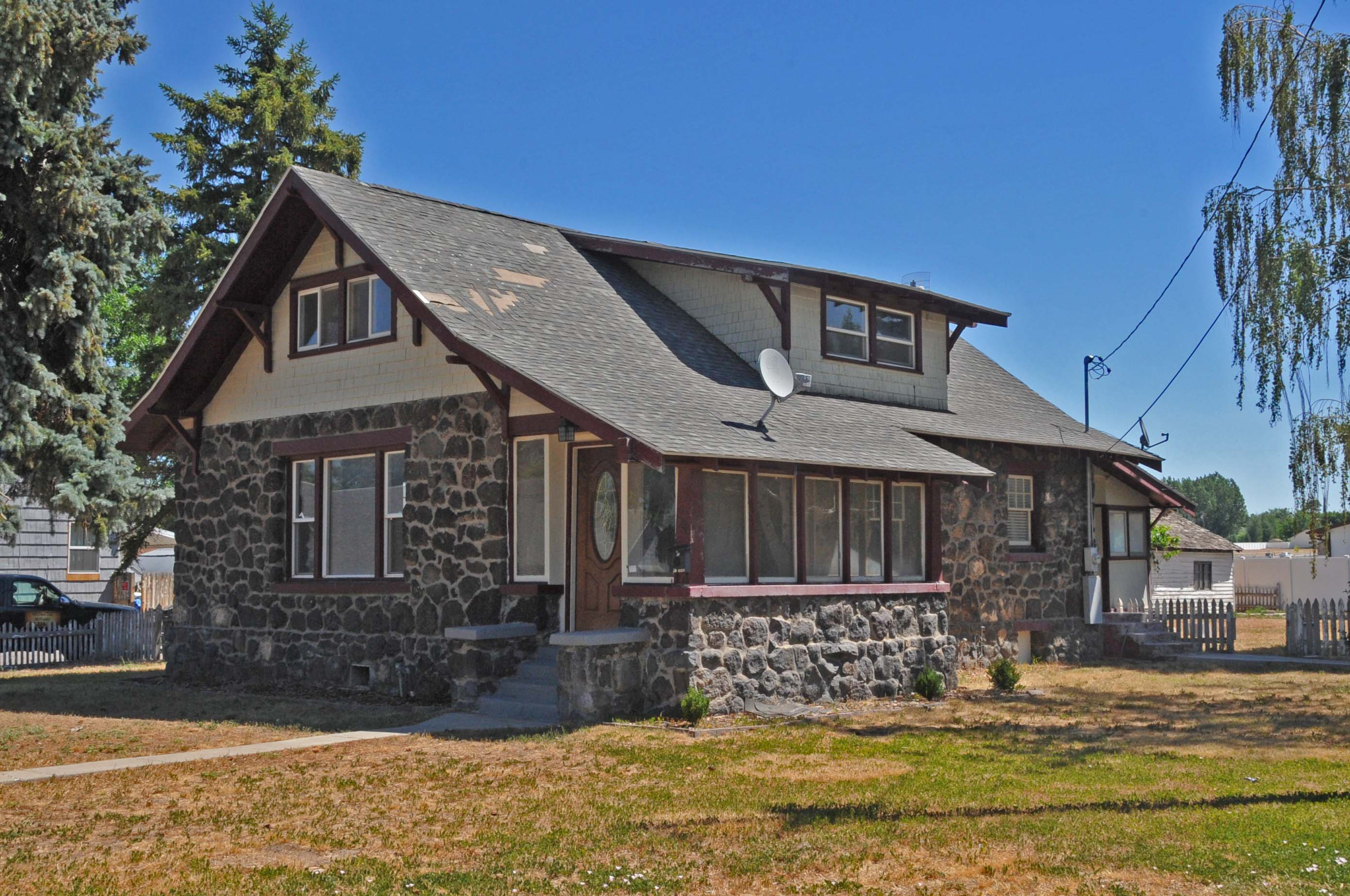
Frank J. Brick House

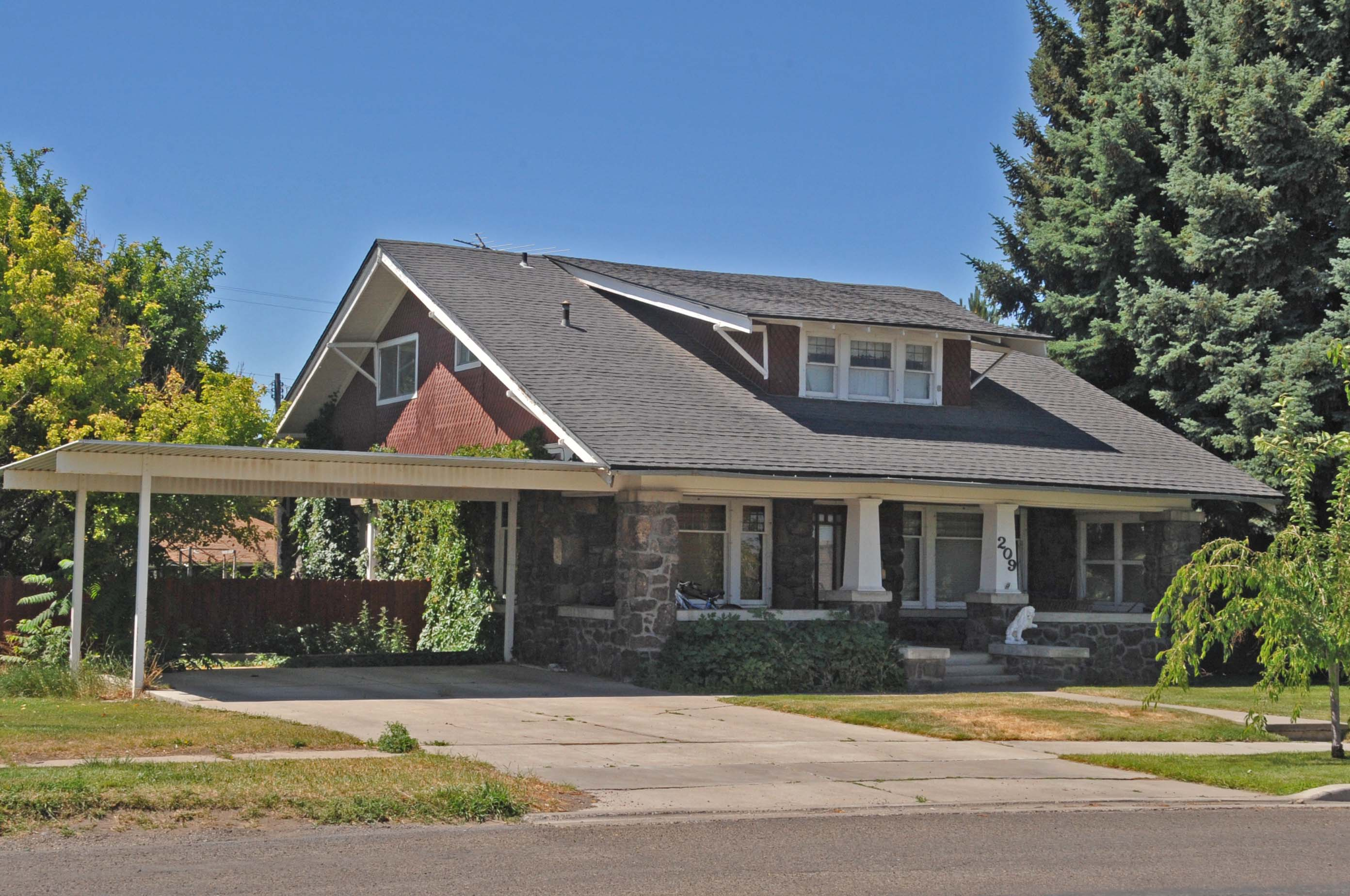
F. C. Gleason House

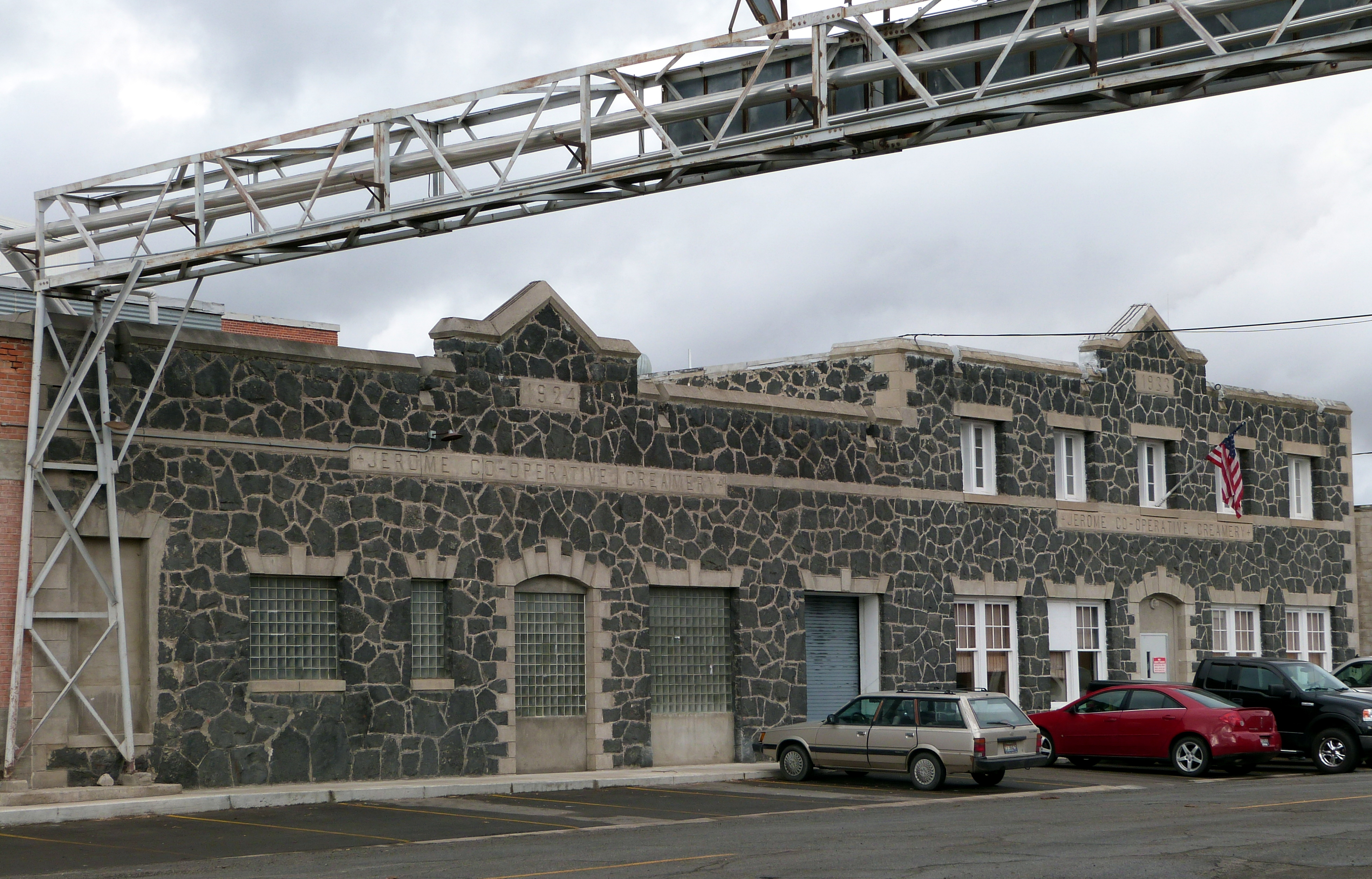
Jerome Cooperative Creamery

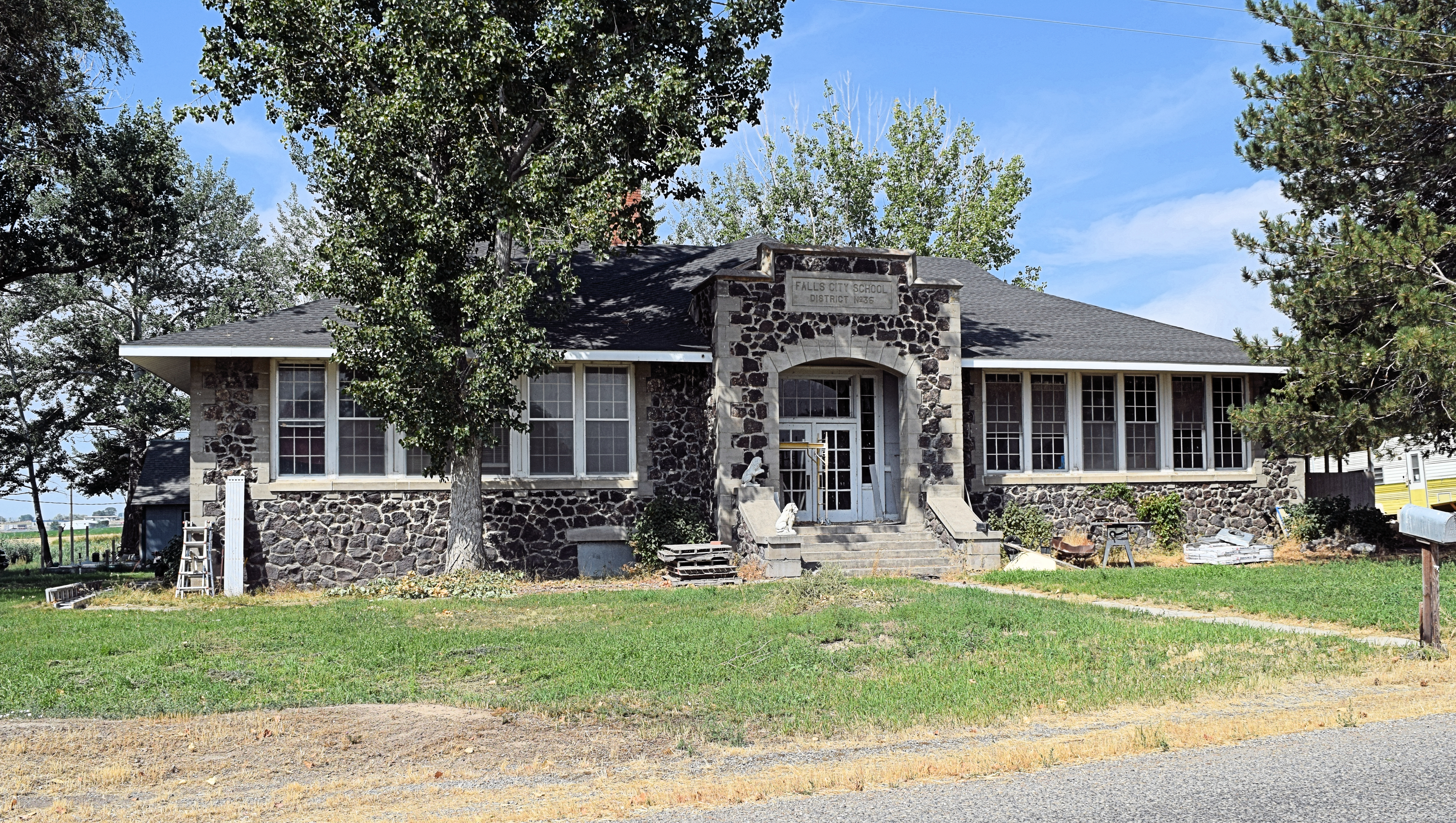
Falls City School House

Works (credit) include:

- Charles Bower House, built 1917, located north of Jerome, Idaho
- Frank J. Brick House, built 1907, at 300 N. Fillmore St., Jerome, Idaho
- Canyonside School, built 1920, south of Jerome, Idaho
- E. V. Cooke House, NE of Jerome, ID
- George V. Doughty House and Garage, NE of Jerome, ID
- Falls City School House, SE of Jerome, ID
- Merrit Fry Farm, W of Jerome, ID
- F. C. Gleason House, 209 E. Ave. A, Jerome, ID
- Lulu Graves Farm, NW of Jerome, ID
- Heuer Well House/Water Tank, NE of Jerome, ID
- Jerome City Pump House, 600 Block of E. B St., Jerome, ID
- Jerome Cooperative Creamery, 313 S. Birch St., Jerome, ID
- Jerome First Baptist Church, 1st Ave., E., Jerome, ID
- Clarence Keating House, NE of Jerome, ID
- Thomas J. Kehrer House, N of Jerome, ID
- Joseph Mandl House, 800 N. Fillmore St., Jerome, ID
- Jessie Osborne House, W of Jerome, ID
- John F. Schmerschall House, 248 E. Ave. A, Jerome ID
- Sugarloaf School, E of Jerome, ID
- Don Tooley House, NE of Jerome, ID
- Jacob B. Van Wagener Caretaker's House, SE of Jerome, ID
- William Weigle House and Water Tank, NW of Jerome, ID

His works include at least one lava rock loafing shed, at Lulu Graves Farm.

== See also ==
- Ignacio Berriochoa, Jack Oughton, and Bill Darrah contemporary Lincoln County, Idaho stonemasons
