= Clarence Keating House =

Historic house in Idaho, United States

- U.S. National Register of Historic Places
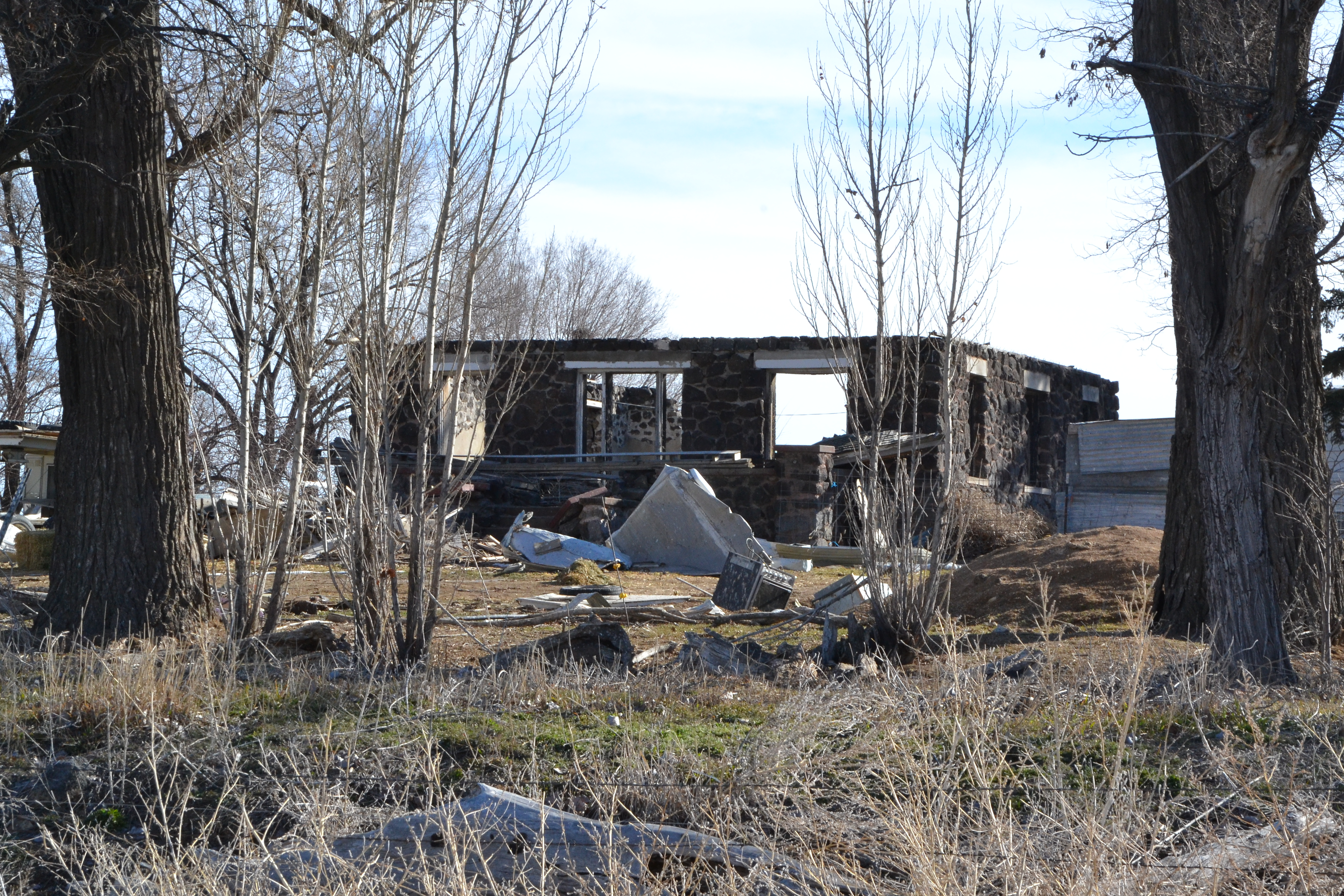

- Location within Idaho Location within the United States
- Nearest city: Jerome, Idaho
- Coordinates: 42°45′26″N 114°27′41″W
- Area: less than one acre
- Built: 1917
- Built by: Pugh, H. T.
- Architectural style: Colonial Revival
- MPS: Lava Rock Structures in South Central Idaho TR
- NRHP reference No.: 83002341
- Added to NRHP: September 8, 1983

The Clarence Keating House is a house located near Jerome, Idaho, in the United States, that was listed on the National Register of Historic Places in 1983.

It was built in 1917 by master stonemason H.T. Pugh. It includes Colonial Revival architecture.

== See also ==
- List of National Historic Landmarks in Idaho
- National Register of Historic Places listings in Jerome County, Idaho
