= George V. Doughty House and Garage =

Historic house in Idaho, United States

- U.S. National Register of Historic Places
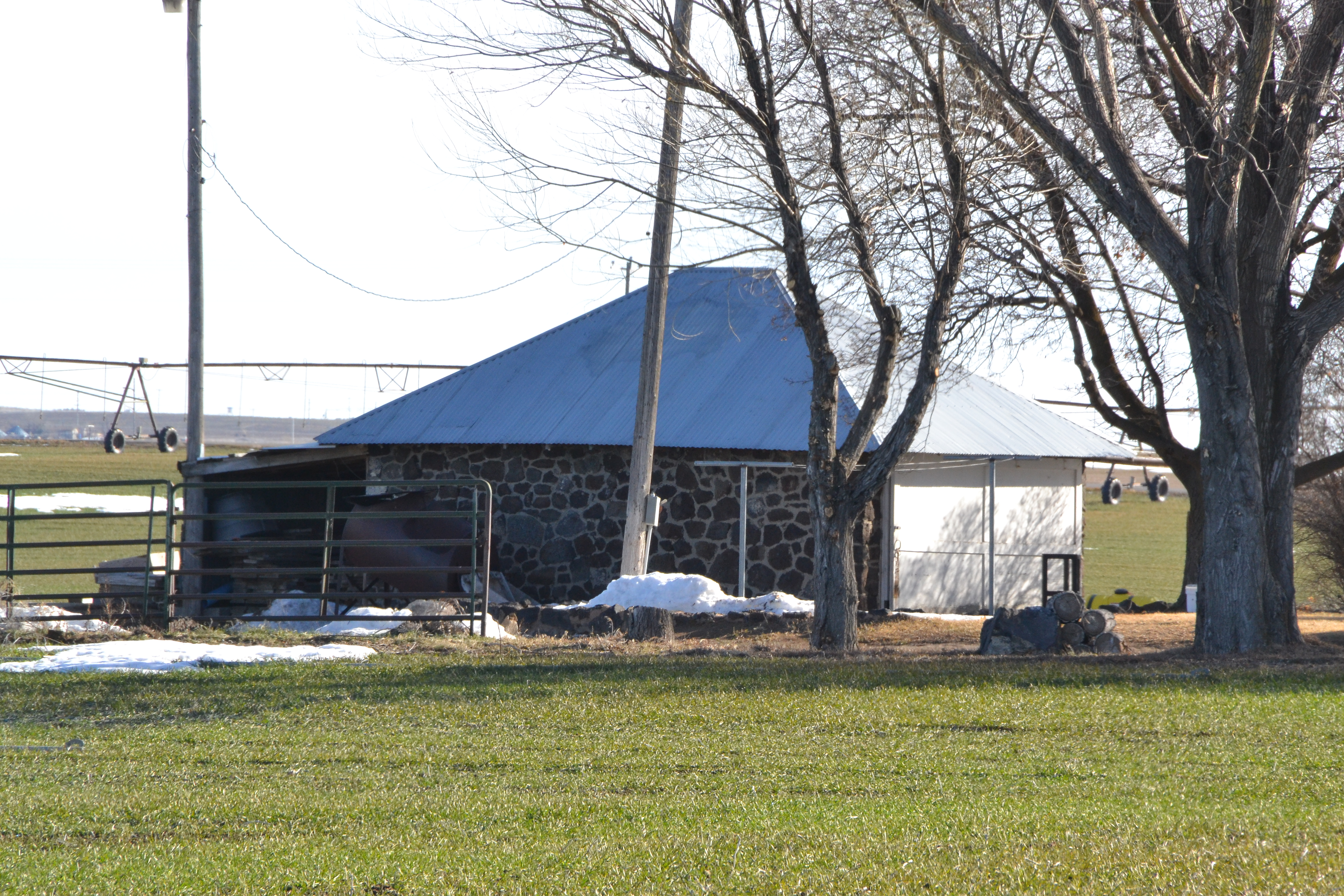
- Doughtry Garage

- Location within Idaho Location within the United States
- Nearest city: Jerome, Idaho
- Coordinates: 42°46′58″N 114°28′40″W
- Area: less than one acre
- Built: 1914
- Built by: Pugh, H. T.
- Architectural style: Colonial Revival, Bungalow
- MPS: Lava Rock Structures in South Central Idaho TR
- NRHP reference No.: 83002326
- Added to NRHP: September 15, 1983

The George V. Doughty House and Garage are a historic house and garage located northeast of Jerome, Idaho, United States. The lava rock buildings were constructed in 1914 by stonemason H. T. Pugh for farmer George V. Doughty. The house's design includes a Colonial Revival style hipped roof and a bungalow style front porch.

The house and garage were listed on the National Register of Historic Places in 1983.

== See also ==
- List of National Historic Landmarks in Idaho
- National Register of Historic Places listings in Jerome County, Idaho
