= Heuer Well House/Water Tank =

- U.S. National Register of Historic Places
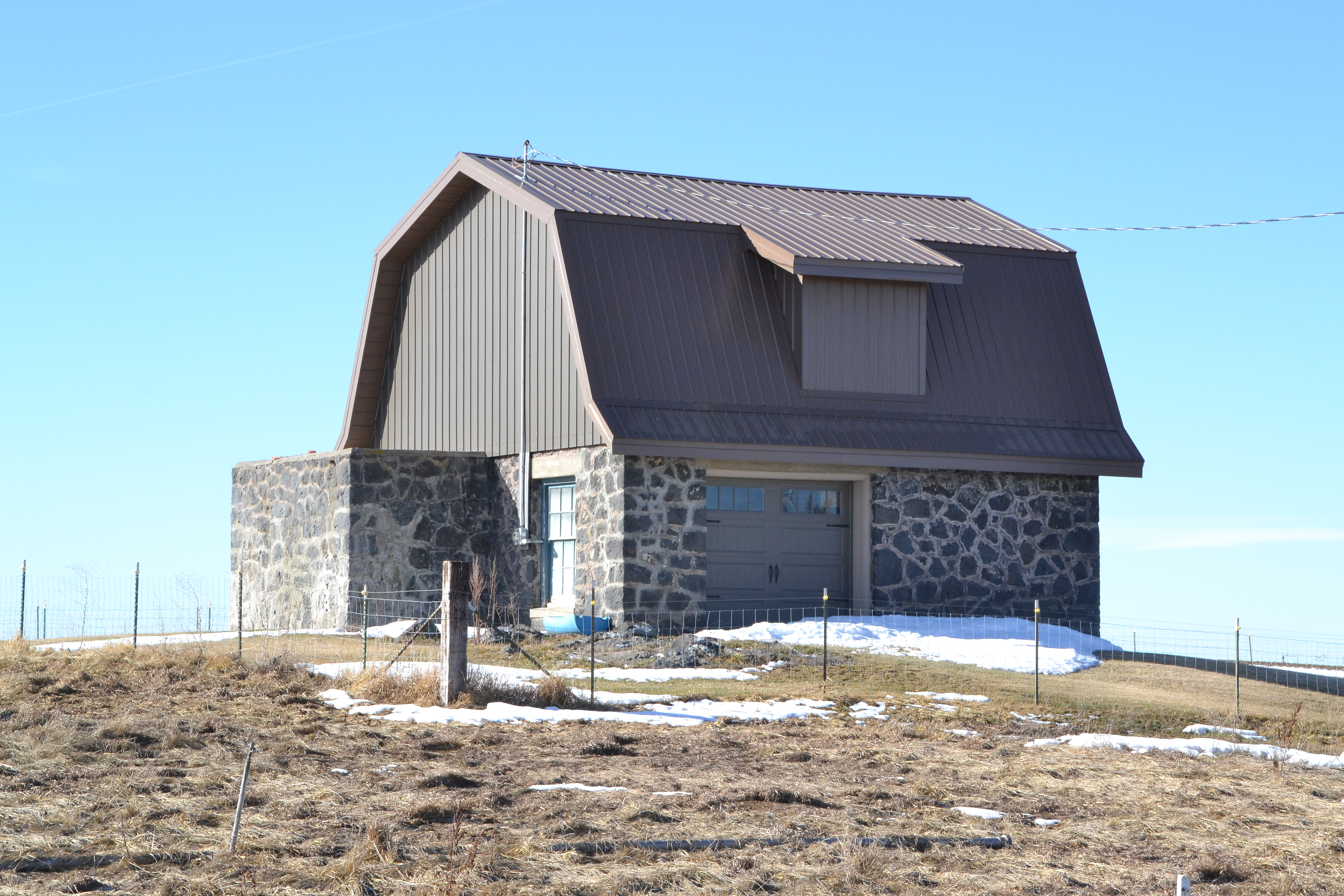

- Location within Idaho Location within the United States
- Location: Northeast of Jerome, Idaho
- Coordinates: 42°46′2″N 114°26′38″W
- Area: less than one acre
- Built: 1929
- Built by: H.T. Pugh
- MPS: Lava Rock Structures in South Central Idaho TR
- NRHP reference No.: 83002345
- Added to NRHP: September 8, 1983

The Heuer Well House/Water Tank, located northeast of Jerome, Idaho, is a lava rock house with joined water tank which was built in 1929 by stonemason H.T. Pugh and Ed Bennett. It was listed on the National Register of Historic Places in 1983.

It is located about 3 miles (4.8 km) north and 3 miles (4.8 km) east of Jerome.

The house is a one and one-half story building approximately 26 by 34 feet (7.9 m × 10.4 m) in plan, with a gambrel roof. A water tank, about 13 by 8 feet (4.0 m × 2.4 m) in size, protrudes from the house, with its rear wall being an extension of the house's rear wall.
