= Doughty House (Mount Pleasant, Michigan) =

Historic house in Michigan, United States

- U.S. National Register of Historic Places
- Michigan State Historic Site
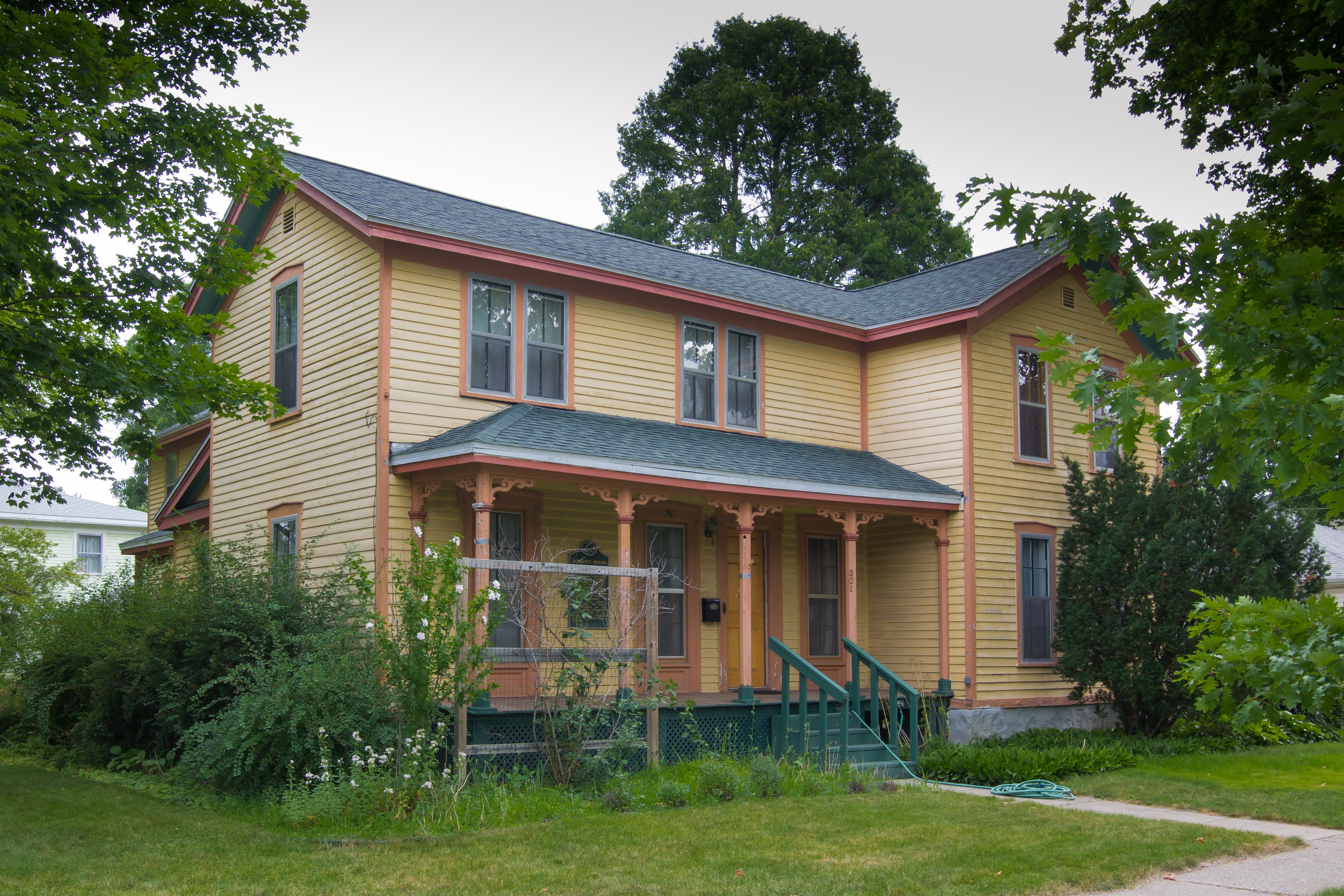

- Location within Michigan Location within the United States
- Interactive map
- Location: 301 Chippewa St., Mount Pleasant, Michigan
- Coordinates: 43°36′21″N 84°46′27″W
- Area: less than one acre
- NRHP reference No.: 74000989

Significant dates
- Added to NRHP: October 29, 1974
- Designated MSHS: May 17, 1973

The Doughty House is a private house located at 301 Chippewa Street in Mount Pleasant, Michigan, United States. It was designated a Michigan State Historic Site in 1973 and listed on the National Register of Historic Places in 1974. It is the oldest remaining house in Mount Pleasant.

== History ==
The plot of land on which this house stands was owned by Harvey and Cordelia Morton until 1864, when they sold it to Isaac A. Fancher. Although the construction date of this house is unrecorded. it is likely to have been shortly before the 1864 sale, due to the unusually high price of the sale.

In the fall of 1869, the brothers Wilkinson and Jared Doughty moved to Mount Pleasant. Wilkinson Doughty purchased this house on September 26, 1869, and the two brothers opened a general store in downtown Mount Pleasant. The store was destroyed in a large 1875 fire, and Wilkinson Doughty went on to open a dry goods store.

Doughty was an early civic leader in Mount Pleasant, and served as one of the first town trustees and was active in the Mt. Pleasant Improvement Company. He was also a founder of Central Michigan Normal School (now Central Michigan University). Wilkinson Doughty lived in this house until his death in 1909. After that, both the house and the dry goods store passed to his son Ralph. Ralph died in 1920, leaving the house to his daughter Margaret, who lived there until at least the early 1970s.

== Description ==
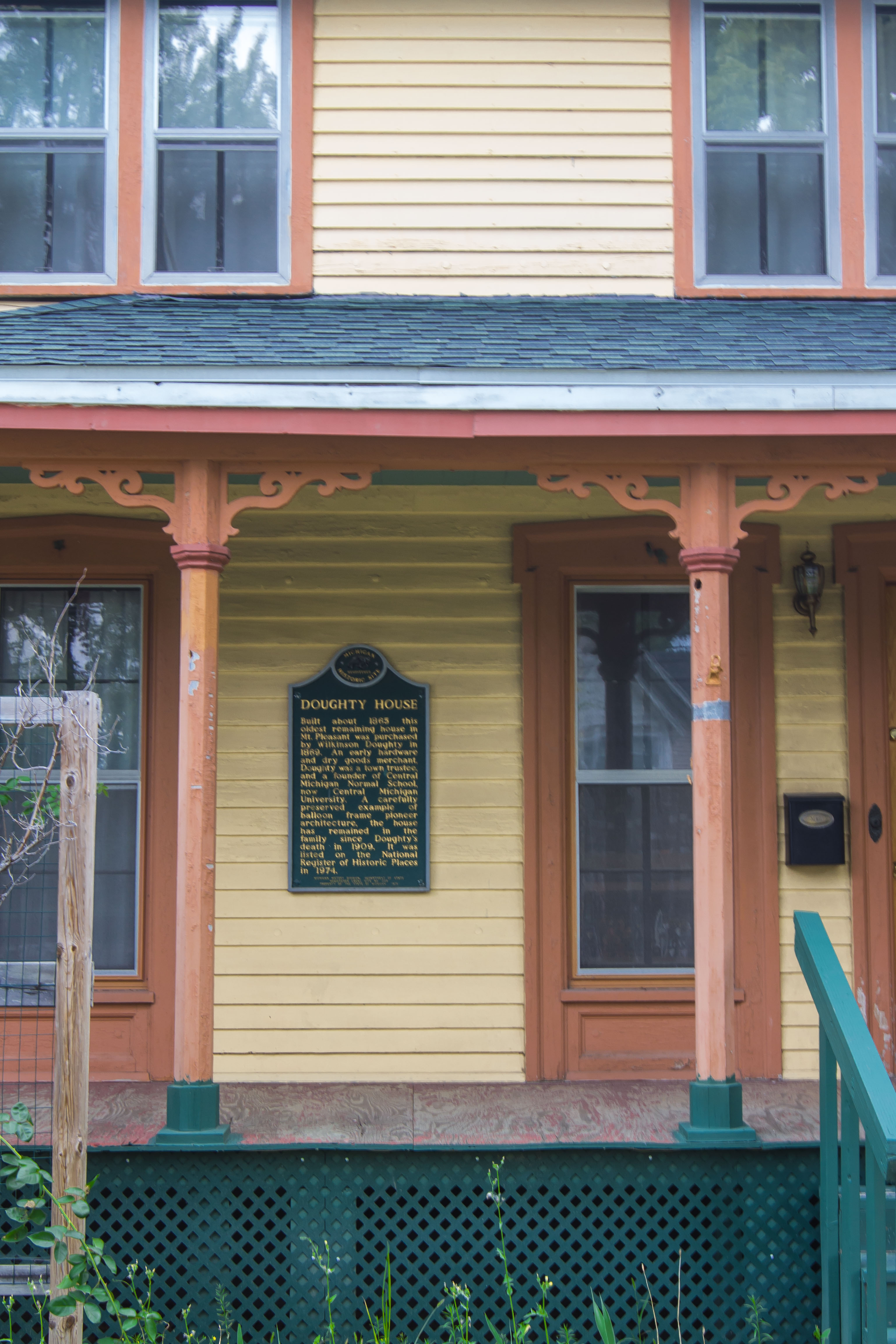
Doughty House porch details

The Doughty House is a prime example of balloon frame pioneer architecture. It is a two-story gabled-ell structure clad in clapboards on a fieldstone foundation. It is roughly T-shaped in plan, measuring 48 feet by 70 feet. The house has two porches, one on the front and one on the side. Both porches have thin square-section posts with delicate curvilinear brackets.

The interior of the house has undergone extensive renovation. However, the exterior is nearly identical to the original plan when built. Part of the side porch has been enclosed, and a small garage added, but otherwise the house is original.
