= Spencer Rock House =

- U.S. National Register of Historic Places
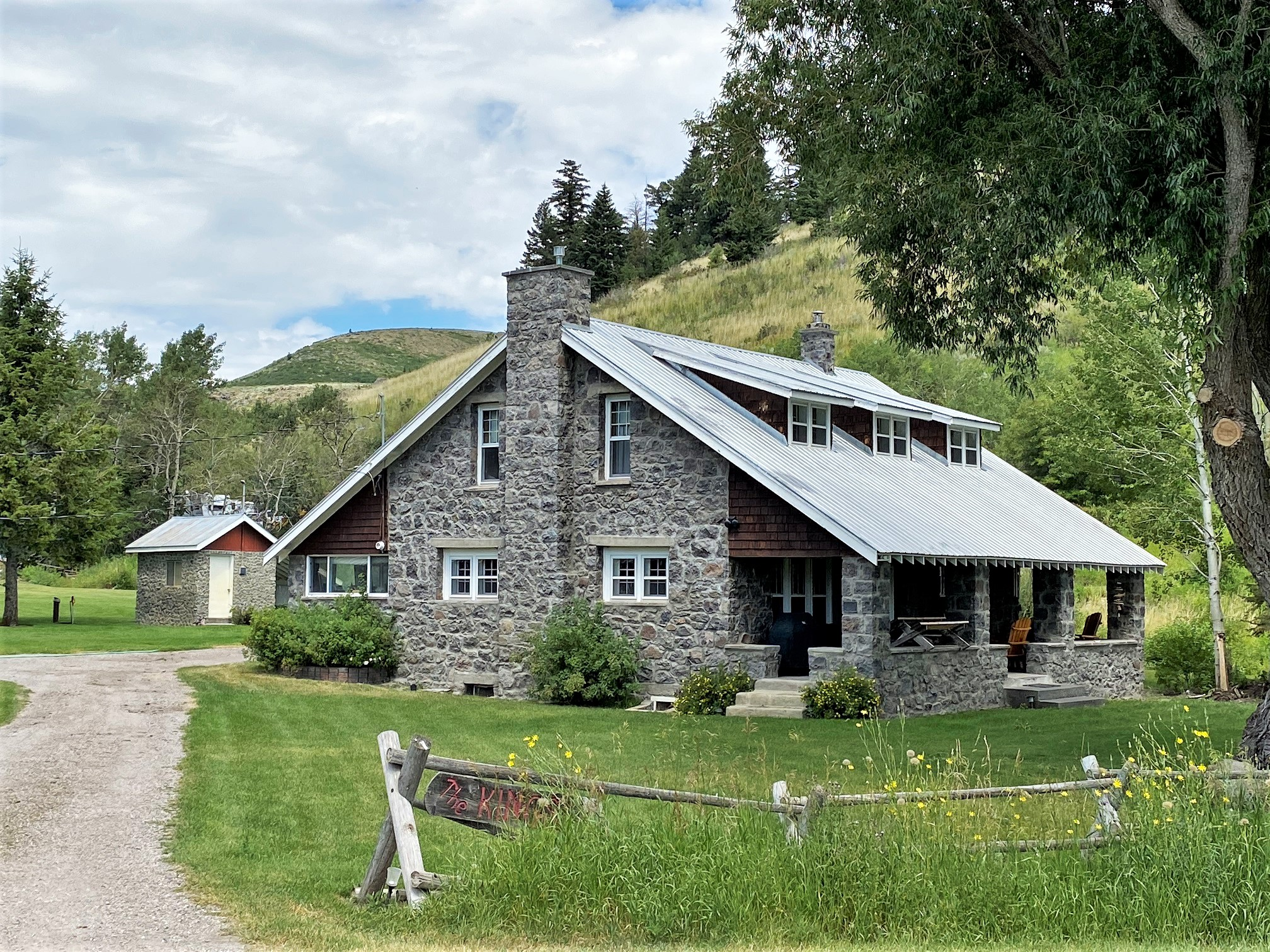
- Spencer Rock House in 2023

- Location within Idaho Location within the United States
- Location: Off U.S. Route 91 at Huntley Canyon, Spencer, Idaho
- Coordinates: 44°21′50″N 112°11′19″W
- Area: 2.3 acres (0.93 ha)
- Built: 1919
- Architectural style: Bungalow/craftsman
- NRHP reference No.: 89001991
- Added to NRHP: November 30, 1989

The Spencer Rock House, located off U.S. Route 91 at Huntley Canyon, in or near Spencer, Idaho, was built in 1919. It was listed on the National Register of Historic Places in 1989.

It is a two-story, side-gabled Craftsman style stone house. It is significant as "the single remaining example of stone construction in the area and one of the last existing buildings with close association to the Wood Live Stock Company, the company which established the sheep industry in Clark County, Idaho, and much of the rest of northeastern Idaho and southwestern Montana."

It was home of Charles W. Hardy, one of the principals of the Wood Live Stock Company. It is also known as Charles W. Hardy House and as Centennial Mountain Lodge.
