= E. C. Gleason House =

Historic house in Idaho, United States

- U.S. National Register of Historic Places
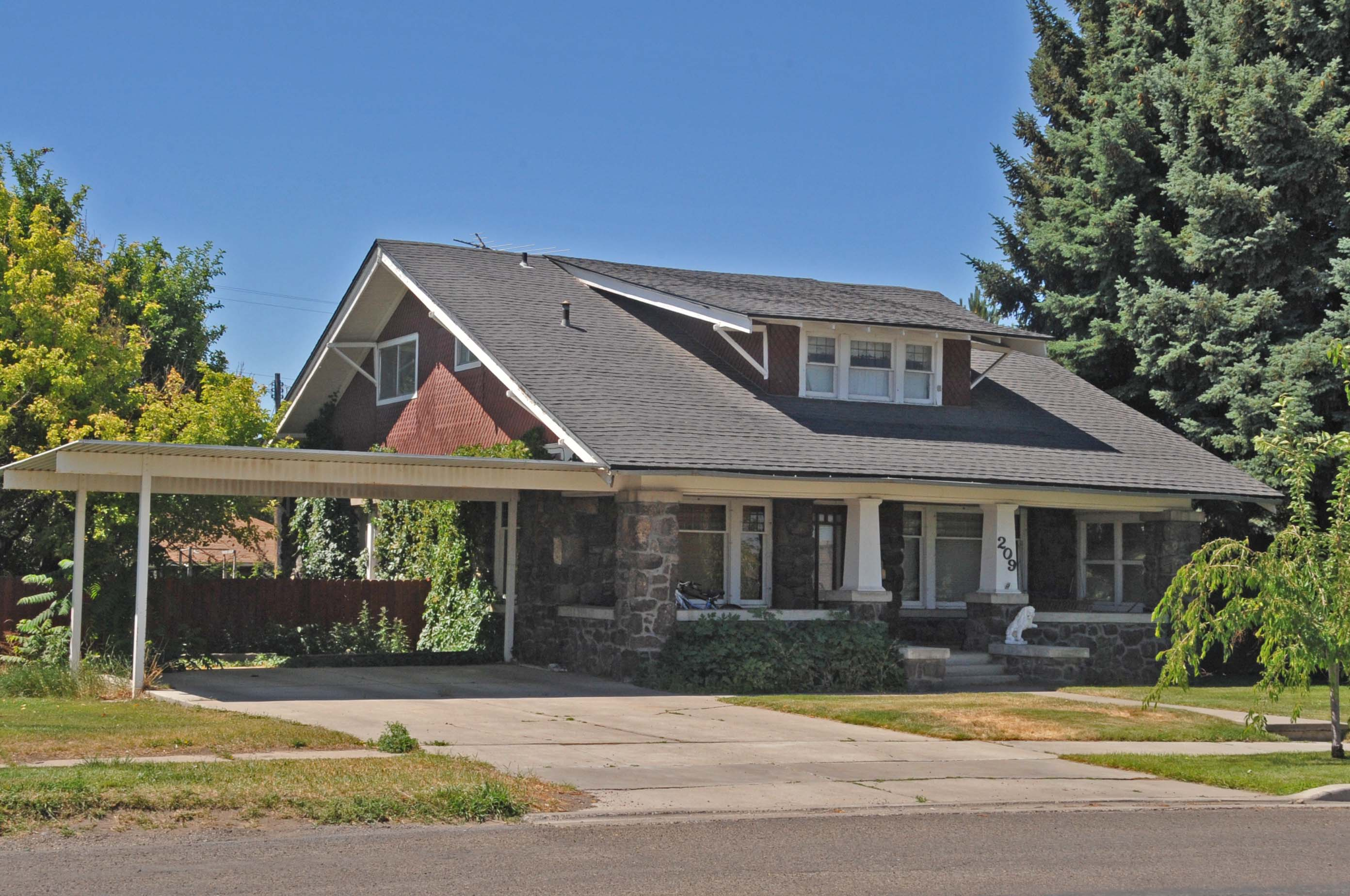

- Location within Idaho Location within the United States
- Nearest city: Jerome, Idaho
- Coordinates: 42°43′22″N 114°30′54″W
- Area: 0.1 acres (0.040 ha)
- Built: 1918
- Built by: Pugh, H. T.
- Architectural style: Bungalow
- MPS: Lava Rock Structures in South Central Idaho TR
- NRHP reference No.: 83002350
- Added to NRHP: September 8, 1983

The E. C. Gleason House is a historic house located at 209 East Avenue A in Jerome, Idaho. The house was built in 1918 for farmer E. C. Gleason. Prominent Jerome stone mason H. T. Pugh built the house out of lava rock in the bungalow style. The house was both Pugh's first work within the city of Jerome and his first bungalow; the quality of his work popularized both bungalows and lava rock as a building material in Jerome. The exterior of the house is formed by randomly yet carefully arranged stones joined by dark mortar; its design includes a full porch, wide eaves with diagonal brackets, and dormers with shed roofs on the front and back.

The house was added to the National Register of Historic Places on September 8, 1983.
