= Kilgore, Idaho =

Unincorporated community in the state of Idaho, United States

Coordinates: 44°24′08″N 111°53′38″W

Kilgore is an unincorporated community on Antelope Valley Road in Clark County, Idaho, United States. Kilgore is situated next to the East Camas Creek.

It is the nearest community to Camas Meadows Battle Sites, a National Historic Landmark.

== History ==
Kilgore's population was 85 in 1909, and was 20 in 1960.
