= List of National Historic Landmarks in Idaho =

This is a complete List of National Historic Landmarks in Idaho. The United States National Historic Landmark program is operated under the auspices of the National Park Service, and recognizes structures, districts, objects, and similar resources nationwide according to a list of criteria of national dept.

The state of Idaho is home to 11 of these landmarks, spanning a range of history from the Lewis and Clark expedition to the beginnings of nuclear power. The table below lists all of these sites, along with added detail and description.

== Key ==
	National Historic Landmark
^{†}	National Historic Landmark District
^{#}	National Historic Site, National Historical Park, National Memorial, or National Monument
^{*}	Delisted Landmark

	Landmark name	Image	Date designated	Location	County	Description
1	Assay Office	Assay Office	May 30, 1961 (#66000305)	Boise; 43°36′41″N 116°11′45″W	Ada	This assay office symbolizes the importance of mining in the history of Idaho and the American West. Built in 1870-71, it operated by the federal government until 1933.
2	Bear River Massacre Site	Bear River Massacre Site	June 21, 1990 (#73000685)	Preston; 42°08′46″N 111°54′51″W	Franklin	Where California Volunteers wrought Bear River Massacre upon a Shoshoni village in 1863.
3	Camas Meadows Battle Sites	Camas Meadows Battle Sites	April 11, 1989 (#89001081)	Kilgore; 44°21′11″N 111°53′06″W	Clark	Sites of the 1877 Battle of Camas Creek, which allowed Nez Perce to further elude capture during the Nez Perce War.
4	Cataldo Mission	Cataldo Mission	July 4, 1961 (#66000312)	Cataldo; 47°32′55″N 116°21′30″W	Kootenai	This Jesuit mission to the Coeur d'Alenes, dating from the 1850s, is the oldest remaining mission church in the Pacific Northwest.
5^{†}	City of Rocks	City of Rocks	July 19, 1964 (#66000308)	Almo; 42°04′33″N 113°42′52″W	Cassia	Thousands of emigrants on the California Trail made this a popular resting point, and left wagon ruts that are still visible today. For these emigrants, the landscape of rock outcrops rising like city buildings, woodlands, and mountains provided a welcome change from the surrounding sagebrush plains.
6	Experimental Breeder Reactor No.1	Experimental Breeder Reactor No.1	December 21, 1965 (#66000307)	Arco; 43°30′34″N 113°00′20″W	Butte	This pioneering nuclear reactor was the site of several milestones in the development of nuclear technology, including the first usable electricity (1951), the first self-sustaining chain reaction using plutonium rather than uranium (1963), and the first demonstration of the feasible use of high-temperature liquid metal as a reactor coolant.
7	Fort Hall	Fort Hall	January 20, 1961 (#66000306)	Fort Hall; 43°01′13″N 112°38′05″W	Bannock	Outpost where the Oregon Trail forked, splitting off the California Trail.
8	Lemhi Pass	Lemhi Pass	October 9, 1960 (#66000313)	Tendoy, ID; 44°58′29″N 113°26′41″W	Lemhi, ID and Beaverhead, MT	Pass crossed by the Lewis and Clark Expedition in August 1805
9	Lolo Trail	Lolo Trail	October 9, 1960 (#66000309)	Lolo Hot Springs, MT; 46°38′07″N 114°34′47″W	Clearwater, ID and Missoula, MT	Difficult trail followed by the Lewis and Clark Expedition in 1805 and returning in 1806.
10	Strategic Air Command Ground Alert Facility		December 11, 2023 (#100009818)	12 Bomber Road, Mountain Home Air Force Base; 43°02′33″N 115°51′13″W	Elmore	
11	Weippe Prairie	Weippe Prairie	May 23, 1966 (#66000311)	Weippe; 46°22′00″N 115°56′00″W	Clearwater	Meadow of camas, whose roots were basic food for Nez Perce, where the Lewis and Clark Expedition emerged from Lolo Trail.

There are other historic sites preserved in Idaho. Considering them provides perspective on the NHLs. In particular, there are two areas in the National Park System:

- Nez Perce National Historical Park, a set of 38 sites located throughout the states of Idaho, Montana, Oregon, and Washington which are the traditional aboriginal lands of the Nez Perce. The sites commemorate the history, culture, and stories of the people. Its headquarters are located in Lapwai, Idaho.
- Minidoka National Historic Site, established in 2001, one of ten camps at which Japanese Americans were interned during 1942-45.

Besides the NHLs and NPS areas, the state has approximately 1,000 properties and districts listed in Idaho on the National Register of Historic Places. Some recently listed properties may not yet be in that system. New listings nationwide are announced weekly.

== See also ==
- National Parks in Idaho
- Historic preservation
- History of Idaho
- National Register of Historic Places listings in Idaho
- Nez Perce National Historical Park
- Minidoka National Historic Site
- List of National Natural Landmarks in Idaho
