= Fayette Safety Vault and Trust Company Building =

- U.S. National Register of Historic Places
- U.S. Historic district – Contributing property
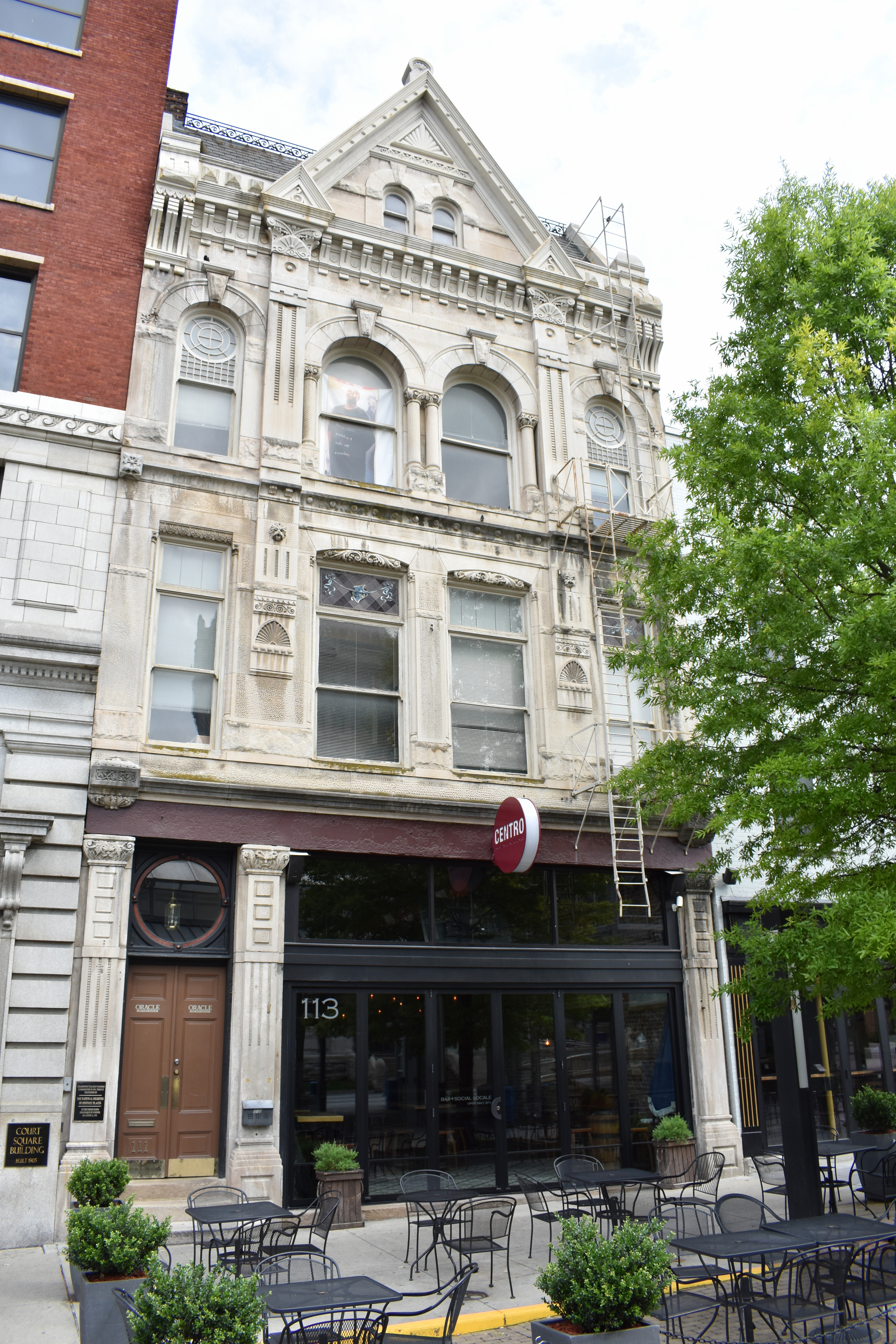
- The Fayette Safety Vault and Trust Company Building in 2019

- Location within Kentucky Location within the United States
- Location: 111-113 Cheapside St., Lexington, Kentucky
- Coordinates: 38°02′52″N 84°29′54″W
- Area: less than one acre
- Built: 1890
- Architect: Herman L. Rowe
- Architectural style: Gothic, High Victorian
- Part of: Downtown Commercial District (ID83000559)
- NRHP reference No.: 80001514

Significant dates
- Added to NRHP: August 11, 1980
- Designated CP: August 25, 1983

The Fayette Safety Vault and Trust Company Building in Lexington, Kentucky, is a commercial building designed by Herman L. Rowe and constructed in 1890. The stone facade was described as "a strange but compelling mixture of Italianate, Neo-Greek, Gothic, and Romanesque motifs," and "not excelled in appearance by any building in Kentucky." It was added to the National Register of Historic Places in 1980.

The building was constructed for the Fayette Safety Vault and Trust Company, organized in 1890 and absorbed by the larger Security Trust and Safety Vault Company in 1892. An early tenant of the building was Lexington's Moving Picture Theatorium.

Architect Herman L. Rowe also designed Lexington's Carnegie library in the Gratz Park Historic District and Argyle Hall at the former Campbell–Hagerman College. He was the supervising architect for the Lexington Opera House, designed by Oscar Cobb and constructed in 1887. The Opera House and Yates Bookshop Building were listed on the National Register of Historic Places in 1975.
