= Herman L. Rowe =

German-American architect

Herman L. Rowe (born Rau; 1839 – 9 January 1913) was a German-American architect active in Lexington, Kentucky. He immigrated to the United States as a child from Germany. A couple of his works are listed on the U.S. National Register of Historic Places (NRHP).

Works include:

- Addition (1881) to Luigart & Harting Complex, Lexington, Kentucky, one of Rowe's earliest works in Lexington
- Lexington Opera House (1886) designed by Oscar Cobb, for which Rowe was supervising architect during construction
- Fayette Safety Vault and Trust Company Building (1890), Lexington, Kentucky, NRHP-listed
- Lexington Public Library (1905), a Carnegie library in Gratz Park, Lexington, Kentucky (now the Carnegie Center for Literacy and Learning)
- Lexington Dry Goods Company Building (1907), 249-251 E. Main St., Lexington, Kentucky, NRHP-listed

For developer Luigart, Rowe also designed a planing mill complex on York Street and a number of other residences and buildings.

When Rowe died suddenly in 1913, he left a considerably large estate without a will. His widow, Nellie Buckley, and his family in Germany were co-heirs. His sisters Julia, Lina, and Sophia, along with his late brother Frederick's two children, sued his widow for their portion of the estate. His German relatives were unhappy with the court's division of the assets and filed an appeal. After World War I started, his widow claimed that due to his German relatives being "enemy aliens", they could not challenge the ruling, but their right to appeal was upheld by a court of appeals.
