= Cheapside (disambiguation) =

Cheapside is a street in London, England.

Cheapside may also refer to:

- Cheapside, Berkshire, a village close to Ascot in Berkshire, England
- Cheapside, Glasgow, a street in Glasgow, Scotland
  - Cheapside Street Whisky Bond Fire, A major fire which occurred in 1960
- Cheapside, Hertfordshire, England (in Anstey parish)
- Cheapside, Ontario, Canada
- Cheapside, Texas, United States
- Cheapside, Virginia, United States
- A neighborhood of Greenfield, Massachusetts, United States
- Cheapside Park, the former name of a park in downtown Lexington, Kentucky, United States
- Cheapside (Doctor Dolittle), a talking sparrow in the novel Doctor Dolittle and its adaptations

== See also ==
- A Chaste Maid in Cheapside
