= Opera House and Yates Bookshop Building =

- U.S. National Register of Historic Places
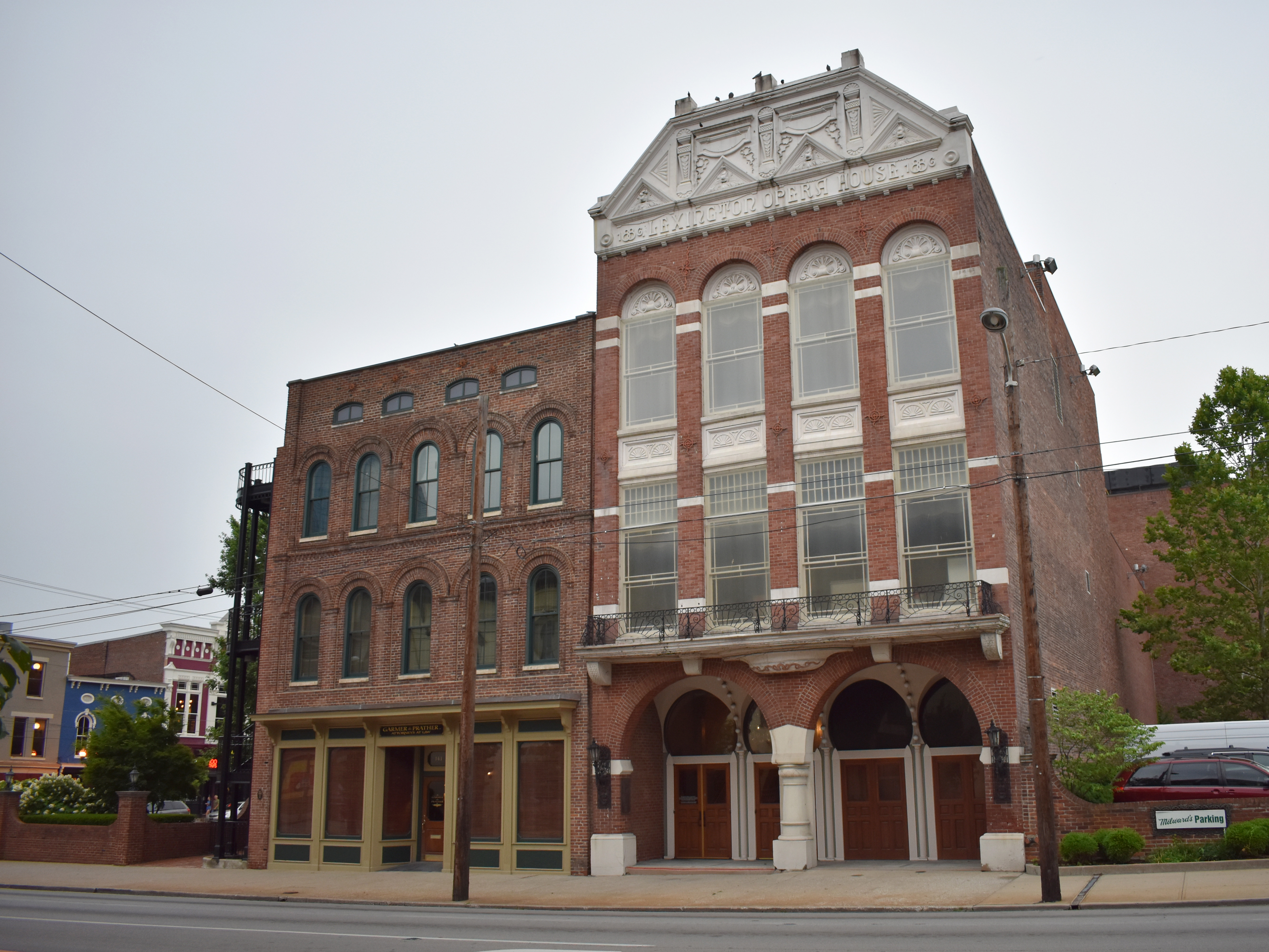
- The Yates Bookshop Building (left) and Opera House (right) in 2019

- Location within Kentucky Location within the United States
- Location: 141 and 145 N. Broadway, Lexington, Kentucky
- Coordinates: 38°03′00″N 84°29′56″W
- Area: 1.3 acres (0.53 ha)
- Built: 1875, 1886
- Architect: Cobb, Oscar; unknown
- Architectural style: Italianate, Gothic Revival
- NRHP reference No.: 75000752
- Added to NRHP: June 11, 1975

The Opera House and Yates Bookshop Building in Lexington, Kentucky, are adjacent buildings listed together on the National Register of Historic Places in 1975, and they are contributing resources in the North Broadway-Short Street Historic District.

The 3-story Lexington Opera House was designed by Oscar Cobb and constructed by Herman L. Rowe in 1886 after a fire earlier that year destroyed Lexington's previous opera house. The Opera House has been described either as Gothic Revival or Queen Anne in its facade. Above the third floor, the facade features a prominent sheet iron relief decoration with the appearance of cut stone.

The 3-story Yates Bookshop Building was constructed about two years after an 1873 fire destroyed the Broadway Hotel. The Italianate building was part of a row of buildings completed after the fire, one of only a few of the buildings to survive urban renewal in the 20th century.
