= Grand Opera House =

Grand Opera House may refer to:

== Australia ==
- Grand Opera House, Sydney

== Canada ==
- Grand Opera House (London, Ontario) (1881–1900)
- Grand Opera House (Toronto)

== France ==
- Palais Garnier in Paris, often called the "Grand Opera House"

== Philippines ==
- Manila Grand Opera House

== United Kingdom ==
- Grand Opera House, Belfast, Northern Ireland
- Grand Opera House, York, England

== United States ==
Alphabetical by state, then city

- Grand Opera House (Los Angeles), California
- Grand Opera House (San Francisco), California
- Grand Opera House (Pueblo, Colorado), designed by Adler & Sullivan
- Grand Opera House (Wilmington, Delaware), NRHP-listed
- Degive's Grand Opera House, Atlanta, Georgia, NRHP-listed
- Grand Opera House (Macon, Georgia), NRHP-listed
- Beardstown Grand Opera House, Beardstown, Illinois, NRHP-listed
- Grand Opera House (Chicago), Illinois
- Grand Opera House (Dubuque, Iowa), NRHP-listed
- Ford's Grand Opera House, Baltimore, Maryland
- Grand Opera House (Boston), Massachusetts
- Grand Opera House (St. James, Minnesota), NRHP-listed
- Grand Opera House (Meridian, Mississippi), NRHP-listed
- Grand Opera House (St. Louis), Missouri
- Grand Opera House (Brooklyn), New York
- Grand Opera House (Manhattan), New York City
- Vale Hotel and Grand Opera House, Vale, Oregon, NRHP-listed
- Grand Opera House (Philadelphia), Philadelphia, Pennsylvania
- Grand 1894 Opera House (Galveston, Texas), NRHP-listed
- Grand Opera House (Uvalde, Texas), NRHP-listed
- Grand Opera House (Seattle), Washington
- Grand Opera House (Ashland, Wisconsin)
- Oshkosh Grand Opera House, Wisconsin, NRHP-listed
