= DuPont–Whitehouse House =

Coordinates: 41.8286°N 87.6865°W

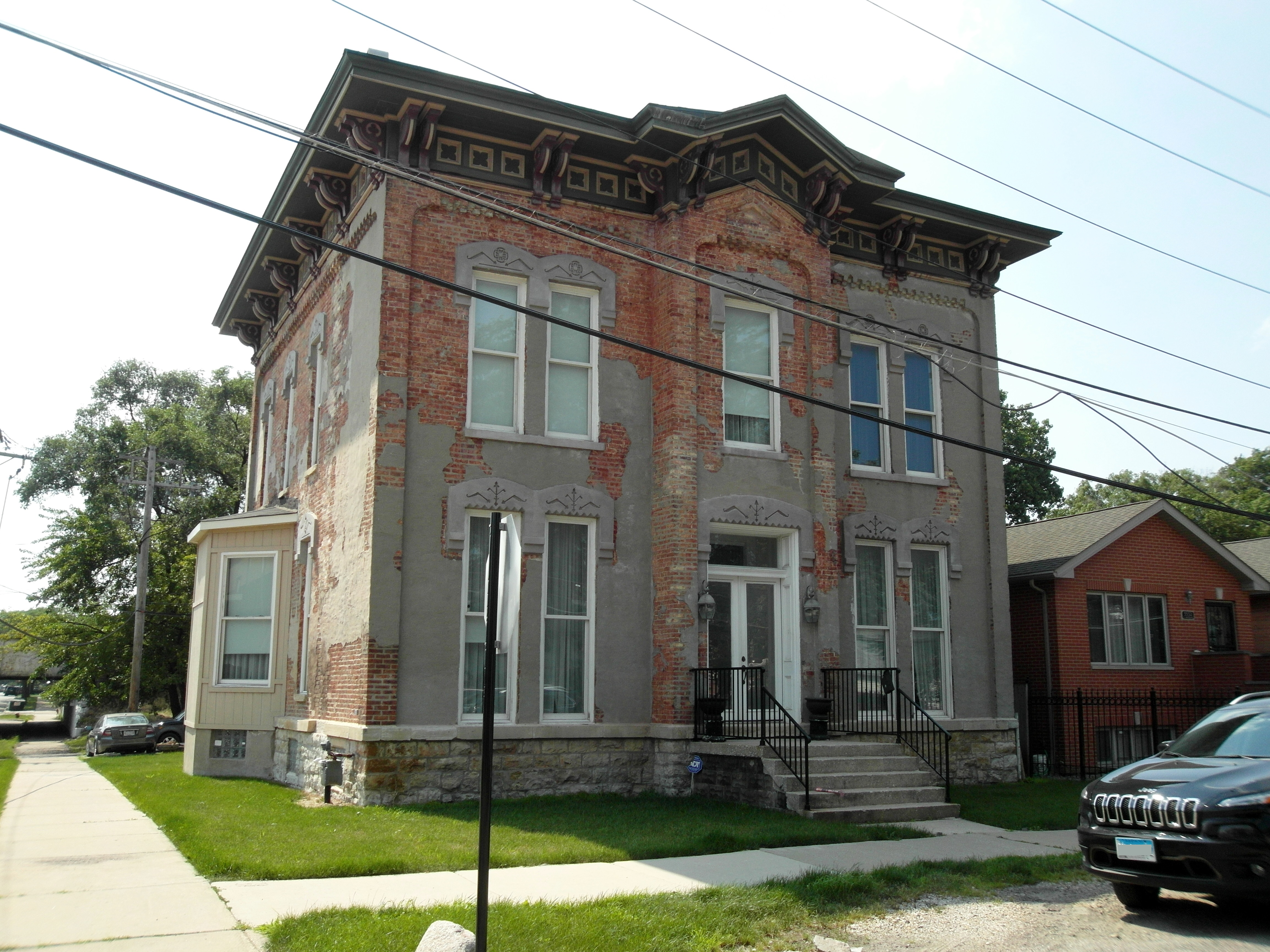
The DuPont–Whitehouse House

The DuPont–Whitehouse House is an Italianate-style house located at 3558 South Artesian Avenue in the McKinley Park neighborhood of Chicago, Illinois, United States. The house was built between 1875 and 1876 by Oscar Cobb & Co. It was designated a Chicago Landmark on April 16, 1996.
