= Cove Haven Cemetery =

Cemetery in Lexington, Kentucky, United States

Coordinates: 38.0649°N 84.5088°W

Cove Haven Cemetery, established by Greenwood Cemetery and Realty Company and formerly known as Greenwood Cemetery, is a cemetery in Lexington, Kentucky. It was established in 1907 as a burial ground for African-Americans, including prominent community leaders. It was founded by a group of 14 formerly enslaved men. PBS affiliate KET aired a program on it.

Hundreds of veteran are buried at the cemetery.

== Burials ==
- Ellen Davis, wealthy heiress
- Margaret Pryor, heiress
- Whitney Young Sr., president of Lincoln Institute
- Ralph Colston Jr., jockey
- Henry Tandy, builder
- Lizzie Fouse, organizer
- Dr. Mary Ellen Britton
- Whitney Young Jr., before being relocated to New York City

=== Musicians ===
- Saunders “Smoke” Richardson Jr. musician who played the baritone saxophone
- Ruby L. King, singer with the Ruby King Celestial Harmonizers
- Georgia Beatrice Barkley Gomez Rainer, opera singer
- Charles Quillings, educator and musician
