= Fox Theater (Stevens Point, Wisconsin) =

- U.S. National Register of Historic Places
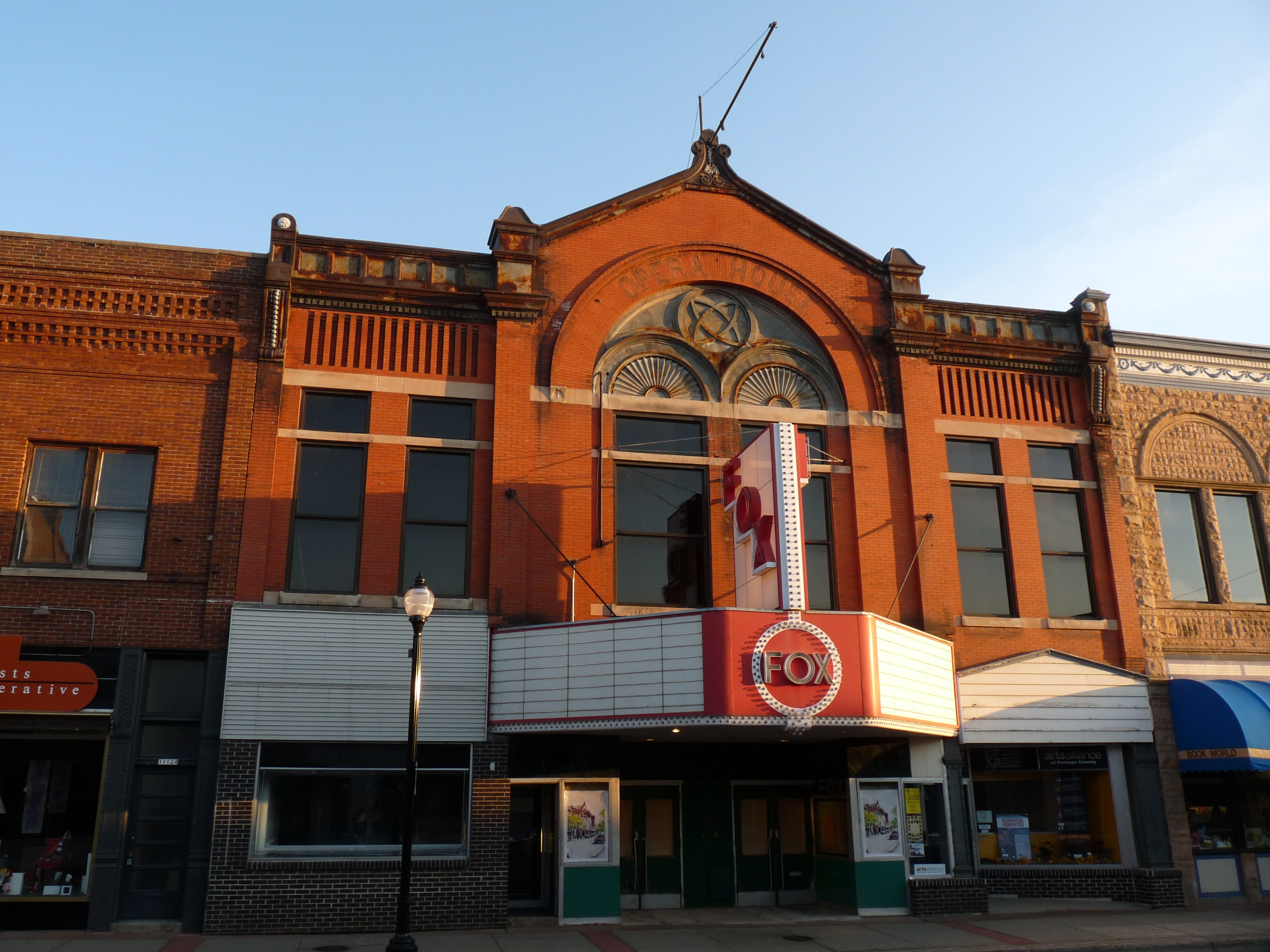
- The Fox Theater
- Location: 1116-1128 Main St. Stevens Point, Wisconsin
- Built: 1894
- Architect: Oscar Cobb
- Architectural style: Romanesque Revival
- NRHP reference No.: 82000698
- Added to NRHP: July 26, 1982

The Fox Theater is located in Stevens Point, Wisconsin. It was added to the National Register of Historic Places in 1982 for its architectural significance.

== History ==
The building was built for G. F. Andrae in 1894. The architect was Oscar Cobb of Chicago, Illinois. It was originally known as the Grand Opera House, and first opened as a vaudeville and stage theater.

G. F. Andrae was a German immigrant and well-known business man in Stevens Point. He was responsible for building a few buildings in town, including the Andrae Block. The Opera House was his way of giving back to the city. His descendants owned the building until September 2020.

== The Opera House ==
Now For the Opera House (From The Gazette, July 19, 1893.)

This forenoon G. F. Andrae secured the deed for the ground upon which he will erect a new Opera House. The ground has a frontage of fifty-five feet on Main Street, and extends thought to Brown Street, the consideration being $4,165. Mr. Andrae has also purchased the lot on Brown Street, adjoining on the west, giving plenty of ground room on the rear for entrance, storage purposes, etc. The property was formerly owned by Henry and J. D. Curran. The contract has been let for moving the building, now occupied as a Chinese laundry, to Brown Street, and the building will be moved on Monday next. The contract for excavation for the basement has also been made, and work upon the same will be commenced at once. Mr. Andrae as has been stated before, has already received a number of plans, but the one he is most favorably impressed with is that furnished by a Chicago architect, who will be here today or tomorrow and look the ground over. This is something that Stevens Point has long needed, and it is a pleasure to be able to announce that the Andrae Opera House will be pushed forward to completion as fast as men can do the work and money provide the material, and that it will be erected in a model style and supplied with the latest and most approved furnishing and conveniences.

Vitascope was played at the Grand (the first motion pictures) on February 11, 1897.

The Grand Opera House closed on February 3, 1915.

== The Majestic Theater ==
The Majestic Theater was the next name of the theater. The stage house and dressing rooms were added to rear of the building, and the box seats were removed to create a larger auditorium. The theater reopened on November 1, 1920 with a performance of "All Aboard For Cuba."

The Fox was remodeled in July–August 1941. A new canopy was built which is still in use today. New sound equipment, projection machines, and an air-conditioning system were installed. A new concrete fireproof floor, with a new pitch was installed on the main floor. The front row was raised 18 inches and the back row was raised eight inches. New seats were installed reducing the seating capacity to 772. The main floor had 568 seats. The front of the balcony had a smoking section with 72 seats. The regular seating section in the upper balcony had 132 seats. The main colors in the theater were burgundy, and the lobbies were green turquoise and yellow. The ladies rest room and lounge were enlarged. The Fox reopened on August 14, 1941 with the movie "Life Begins For Andy Hardy."

In May 1954 CinemaScope was installed along with a new sound system. "The Robe" was the first widescreen movie at the Fox.

The Fox closed for a short time on May 22, 1955; it reopened on July 25, 1955.

Later, it was operated by United Artists Theaters in the 1960s - 1970's. Rogers Cinema operated the theater for a short time before some of the theaters were sold to Essaness Theaters. It was last operated by Essaness Theaters before closing in 1986.

The cities mall project in the early 1980s led to the forced removal of the stage and dressing area, and the heating units which were also in that area. The theater only operated for a short time after the removal of the stage. The last 2 movies that played in the Fox were Off Beat at 5:30 and Out of Africa at 7:30. The announcement that the theater was closed came out on April 25, 1986.

== Efforts to reopen the Fox ==
Multiple efforts have been made to re-open the theater. In 2006, the theater's marquee was restored by the family and its lights were turned on periodically. In January 2011, the Sanders family announced it planned to redevelop the theater if Stevens Point voters approved almost $6 million in funding to revitalize the mall area. Voters approved the referendum later that year. The Sanders family — Ada, Donald and Jeanette — talked with the Arts Alliance of Portage County about the donation. It was a joint effort by Art Alliance of Portage County Board President, Bill Schierl and Ada Sanders, the granddaughter of G. F. Andrae. On February 1, 2013, the Arts Alliance of Portage County, Inc. formally accepted the donation of the Fox Theatre from Ada, Donald and Jeanette Sanders. “My brother, sister and I have been waiting a long time for the right opportunity to contribute the Fox to the cultural vitality of our community”, commented Ada Sanders. “It has always been our goal to see the Fox reopened”.

The alliance formed a committee to develop and operate the theater as the nonprofit Fox Theatre, LLC. The committee was to be led by Gerard McKenna, former dean of the University of Wisconsin-Stevens Point’s College of Fine Arts and Communication.

In 2020, The Opera House LLC is established and began to transform the building into a multi-purpose event space with new installations such as a catering kitchen, full service bar, a second floor ballroom, and an elevator—all while working to preserve the structure’s remaining historical features. Renovations are projected to be completed during 2022. Additionally, the Opera House lot has been restored to its original boundaries. The city agreed to include the purchase of the green space that was once a part of the original lot in the redevelopment agreement with the Opera House LLC. The redevelopment plan intends to turn the extra space into an outdoor gathering area styled after a traditional German beer garden. It will include seating, an outdoor stage, landscaping and public Wi-Fi access.

== Famous people that were on stage at the Fox ==
Harry Houdini performed on April 7 and 8, 1897.

Eugene V. Debs spoke at the Grand on January 6, 1904. He was a five time Socialist candidate for President of the United States.

== Notable moments at the Fox ==
1893-G.F Andre announces he will build an Opera House. Work begins.

1894-Opera House opens with F.E Bosworth as manager. German comedian Andy Amann presented "A Clean Sweep" on opening night. Vaudeville troupes, touring companies, Elks Club Minstrels and other social events are held.

1897-Edison picture shows begin to be shown

1904-Traveling moving-picture (stereoptical) shows first seen.

1912-First silent movie screened. Features like "Keystone Kops" shown.

1915-Opera House Closes "due to unusual business conditions."

1920-Opera House reopens as Majestic Theater with new canopy over entrance. First event is "All aboard for Cuba," staged by a musical touring company.

1921-Myron "Archie" Neumann becomes manager, a post he holds until his death in 1952.

1923-A Barton theater organ is installed.

1928-Wisconsin Amusement Company (now Fox Corp.) takes over operations.

1930-First "sound" films are screened.

1939-Theater closes for a month and reopens with new Fox marquee.

1953-Theater closes for three days when local students picket because of a hike in movie ticket prices. Reopens with new "student priced" tickets.

1955-Projectionists strike because management wants to employ only one projectionist instead of two.

1961-Prudential Insurance takes over management from Fox.

1968-United Artists assumes management lease.

1972-X-rated films begin to be shown in effort to increase business.

1978-Rogers Cinema becomes new management company.

1982-During construction of CenterPoint Mall, 50 feet of the mall is taken off.

1985-Theater closes.

2013-Arts Alliance of Portage County officially accepts donation of the Fox theater

2019-Arts Alliance of Portage County walks away from investing any money into the building and sells to the city of Stevens Point for $1.

2020-Due to deterioration the rear 2/3 of the theater including the auditorium was demolished leaving the front 1/3 for possible future redevelopment.

2020-The city of Stevens Point opens up an RFP process for the sale and repurposing of The Opera House.

2020-The city of Stevens Point sells the remaining building and lot to local entrepreneur.

2020-The Opera House LLC is established.

2020-Renovation work begins in the fall, starting with a structural analysis of the remaining structure.

2022-Anticipated reopening of the Opera House.
