= Masonic Temple Building (Zanesville, Ohio) =

- U.S. National Register of Historic Places
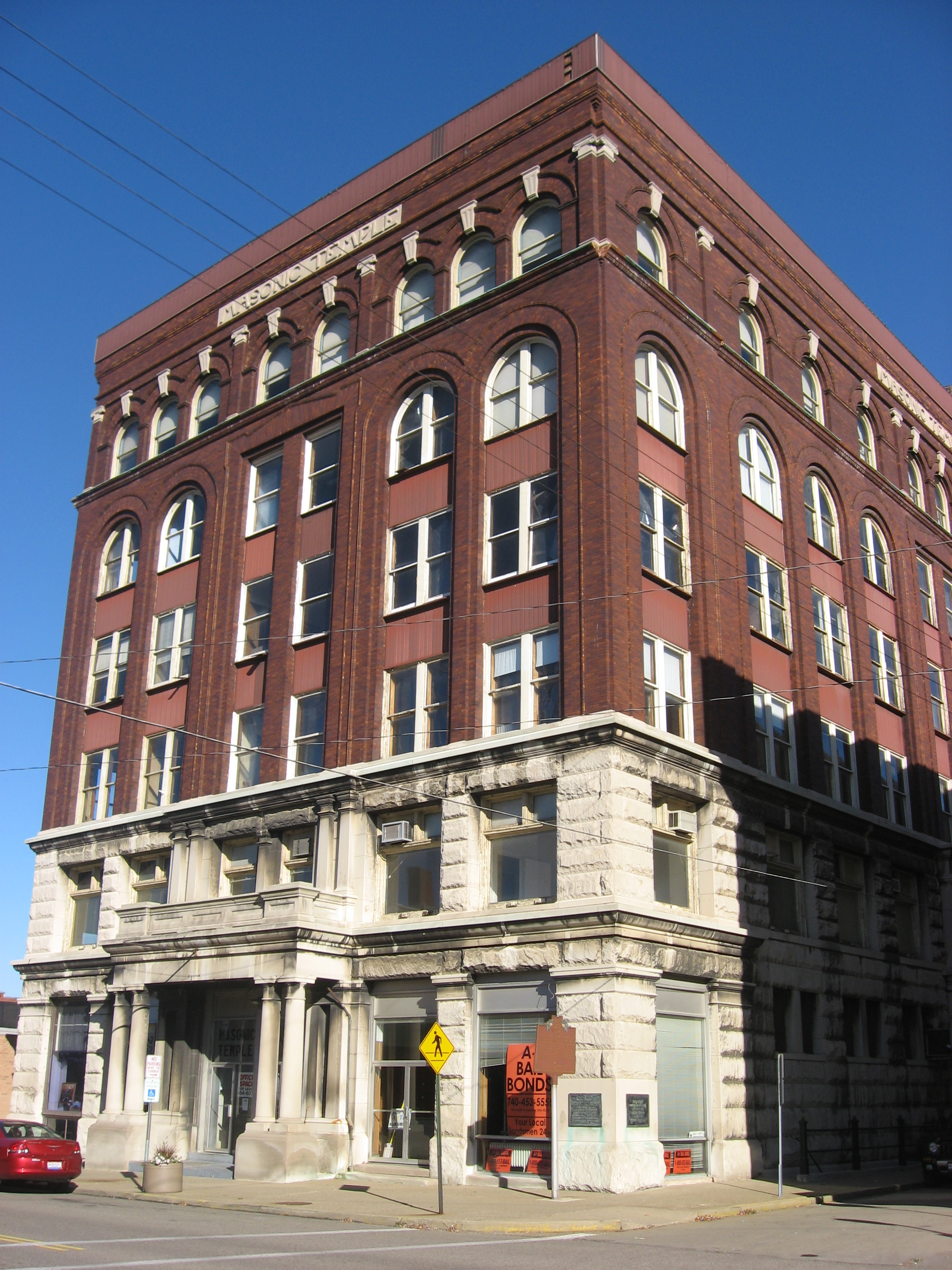
- Masonic Temple Building in 2009

- Location within Ohio Location within the United States
- Location: 36–42 N. Fourth St., Zanesville, Ohio
- Coordinates: 39°56′27″N 82°0′25″W
- Area: less than 1 acre (0.40 ha)
- Built: 1902-1903
- Built by: Robert H. Evans & Co.
- Architect: Oscar Cobb & Son
- Architectural style: Second Renaissance Revival (exterior); Egyptian Revival (interior)
- NRHP reference No.: 90000756<
- Added to NRHP: 25 May 1990

The Masonic Temple Building was a historic building in Zanesville, Ohio. It caught fire on January 6, 2022.

== Description and history ==
The Masonic Temple Building was located at 36–42 N. Fourth Street. The six-story brick building sat on a rock-faced stone foundation. The building displayed a three-part vertical arrangement with divisions demarcated by brick and stone string courses. Rock-faced stone with stone string courses made up the lower two stories. The four stories above were brick laid in the common bond pattern. Alternating series of arcaded and pedimented windows in pairs balanced the third and fifth story in this arrangement. When first constructed the building had two principle facades, one (west) fronting Fourth Street and the other opening into a park. The park which is no longer there provided a frontage for the county courthouse next door. Both of these elevations had centrally located elaborate stone porticoes with full entablatures on paired Doric columns. The words "Masonic Temple" were carved into stone panels at the center of brick entablatures on both of these elevations.

This building was the sixth built by the local Masonic lodge. It was designed by Oscar Cobb & Son of Chicago and built by Robert H. Evans & Co. The cornerstone was laid in 1902 and the building was completed in 1903. The architectural styles reflected are Second Renaissance Revival on the exterior and Egyptian Revival in the interior. The property was listed on the National Register of Historic Places on May 25, 1990.

The Masonic Temple was destroyed in a fire in the late night of January 6, 2022. Demolition of the structure began on the evening of January 21, 2022.

== See also ==
- Historic preservation
- History of Ohio
