= Grand Opera House (Ashland, Wisconsin) =

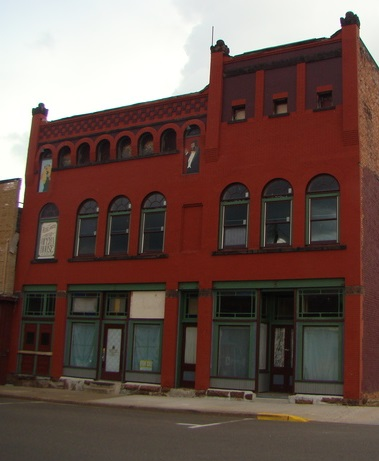
- Front exterior of the Grand Opera House
- Interactive map of Grand Opera House
- Address: 210 Third Avenue West; Ashland, Wisconsin; United States
- Coordinates: 46°35′24″N 90°53′07″W
- Type: Opera House, and Vaudeville venue
- Current use: Vacant storefronts

Construction
- Opened: 1893
- Architect: Oscar Cobb

The Grand Opera House is a historic opera house in Ashland, Wisconsin. The building was one of the first theatres in the region, and was originally a vaudeville/opera house/live performance venue.

Built in 1893, the two-story brick building was designed in the Romanesque Revival Style by architect Oscar Cobb, and was originally surrounded by hotels. The auditorium is located on the second floor, which features graceful arched windows on the street side. The street level contains two storefront spaces with square window designs.

According to the 1893 Ashland Daily Press Annual Edition, the building was originally proposed for a corner of Sixth Avenue West and Main Street West, and was built instead at the present location with a smaller and less expensive design. This was likely due to the financial panic of 1893.

Vacant and in need of restoration, the opera house received some redevelopment, including the restoration of the front facade.

The building is a contributing resource within the West Second Street Historic District of downtown Ashland. Although not located directly on Second Street (later renamed Main Street), it is still considered a contributing property to the Historic District, being located close to the District on a side street.

In later years, the building housed a liquor store and a gun shop.
