= Cheapside Park =

Block in Lexington, Kentucky, US

Coordinates: 38.047955°N 84.49811°W

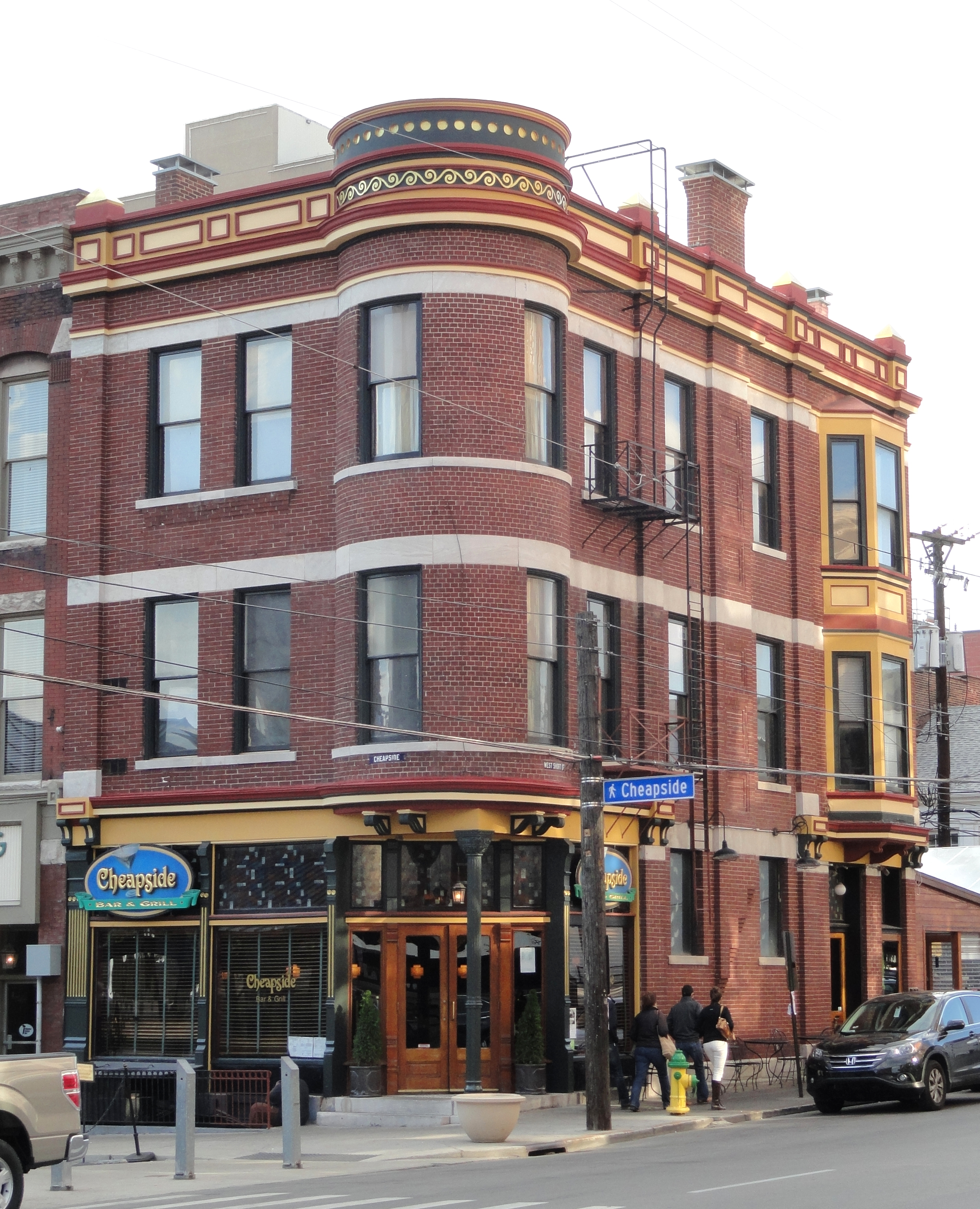
The Jockey Bar now resides near the historic site in downtown Lexington, Kentucky.

Cheapside Park was a block in downtown Lexington, Kentucky, between Upper Street and Mill Street. Cheapside, originally Public Square, was the town's main marketplace in the nineteenth century and included a large slave market before the Civil War.

Cheapside Park played a prominent role in the slave trade, many enslaved people sold here were moved to the lower South, or forced to work in the local areas. The local market served as a conglomerate of local slave traders, slaveholders, and other related individuals.

In 2020 Cheapside Park was renamed Henry A. Tandy Centennial Park, primarily due to local displeasure with the historical context and connotation of the former name. Since renamed, for previously enslaved Henry A. Tandy, it is currently home to the Lexington Farmers Market and popular events such as Thursday Night Live.

== History ==
Cheapside was a major marketplace and one of the largest markets in the south prior to the American Civil War. One of the largest slave markets in the south existed at Cheapside, though it was detested by locals. Cheapside was also host to the sale of "fancy girls", young women of mixed race sold as sex slaves. "Fancy girls" were often transported to Kentucky, due to its reputation for being the largest supplier of these young enslaved women outside of the New Orleans area. However, many of these slaves were born and held within Kentucky's very own borders. The Cheapside slave market allowed slave traders the opportunity to purchase slaves for a low price, which encouraged movement for resale to a more fruitful and profitable market—the deep South. A pair of slave traders, Downing and Hughes, noted raising 57 percent capital on their sale of 13 slaves—purchasing the 13 individuals for $5,292.50, expending $257.72 during their travels to Natchez, Mississippi for resale, and receiving $8,695.00 upon final sale. The total profit, $3,144.78, was encouraging to Downing and Hughes—and eventually, these large returns on investment would encourage others to participate in the arbitrage of slaves, expanding the vastness of the slave trade. Louisville, Henderson, Paducah, and Maysville would become a departure point for many slave traders, their positioning upon the Ohio River would allow easy travel into the Mississippi River, and ultimately the lower South—the more profitable slave markets.

The Kentucky General Assembly attempted to ban or at least cripple the slave trade in 1833 with the Non-Importation Act, which banned the importation of slaves into the Commonwealth for the purpose of selling them. The slave trade was outlawed in 1864. The Cheapside market continued until 1922 when it was declared a public nuisance and banned.

Future President Abraham Lincoln was visiting his wife's family in 1846 when her father, Robert Todd, purchased five slaves at Cheapside. Lincoln may have been present during the auction.

== Origin of name ==
The earliest reference to the name dates to 1813 in an advertisement for Todd and Smith Wholesale Grocery, owned by Mary Todd Lincoln's father Robert Smith Todd. That building is now occupied by a bourbon bar known as The Bluegrass Tavern. Cheapside is a common English name meaning "marketplace" from the Old English "ceapan", meaning "to buy." The name frequently occurs in literature.

== The Pope Villa ==
In 1811, the Pope Villa, named after its first inhabitants, began construction. Kentucky Senator John Pope purchased land from John Maxwell for the Pope Villa to be constructed to serve as his residence as a seated governor—however, the deed was not finalized until 1814. This home was designed by Benjamin Henry Latrobe, who is often considered to be the "father of American architecture". Latrobe had also notably designed the U.S. Capitol Building upon Capitol Hill. The Pope Villa played a prominent role, involved with many affluential figures, in the landscape of American politics and economics—specifically regarding the commodification of human beings.

In 2022, the Bluegrass Trust owns and manages the property—efforts to produce a tour of the historical site are currently underway with the collaboration between the Bluegrass Trust, University of Kentucky History department staff and students, and other departmental researchers.

=== Notable residents ===
Below is information on notable residents of the Pope Villa from 1811 to 1856:

==== John Pope ====
Original owner and financier of the Pope Villa, John Pope served as Kentucky Senator from 1807 to 1813, Kentucky Secretary of State from 1816 to 1819, and as a Lawyer when not an elected official.

==== James Prentiss ====
Prentiss Leased the Pope Villa in 1818 from John Pope. Prentiss is responsible for the failure of Kentucky's first bank, Kentucky Insurance Company of Lexington. Prentiss accumulated massive amounts of debt, before fleeing the state in order to avoid paying the said debt.

==== William T. Barry ====
Seated U.S. Postmaster General under Andrew Jackson from 1829 to 1835, William T. Barry was the only cabinet member who did not resign following the Petticoat Affair. Barry is responsible for many anti-abolitionist newspaper policies and enforcements, including the banning of the famous newspaper, The Liberator.

==== Henry Johnson ====
An attorney who often dealt with the recollection of debts through the sale of collateralized slaves. A deed between Henry Johnson and B.G. Thomas displays his use of the power of attorney to acquire collateralized slaves to meet debts. Johnson took the slave, named Bill, mentioned in the deed, and sold him to J.R. Megowan. J.R. Megowan was a part of a family of slave traders, auctioneers, and bondsmen—his brother, Thomas B. Megowan, was the owner of a "slave jail" in Kentucky.

Henry Johnson begins with 48 slaves under his legal ownership in 1830, to 117 slaves in 1840, and to 442 slaves in 1850. He would eventually sells the Pope Villa in 1856 and moved to Mississippi where he purchases a plantation.

== Take Back Cheapside ==
In August 2020, Lexington's governing body, the Urban County council, voted to rename this area Henry A. Tandy Centennial Park, after Henry A. Tandy, an entrepreneur, leader, and mason whose construction company laid the brick under the Courthouse's stone façade. The impetus for the reimagining of this area began in 2017 with the Take Back Cheapside community organization. The council voted unanimously that year to remove two state-funded statues celebrating Confederate soldiers, Gen. John Hunt Morgan and John C. Breckinridge, Confederate Secretary of War. The historical marker on the corner of Short and Upper streets was commissioned by the Kappa Alpha Psi fraternity.

== See also ==
- Slave markets and slave jails in the United States
