= Old Fayette County Courthouse (Kentucky) =

Historic courthouse in Lexington, KY, US

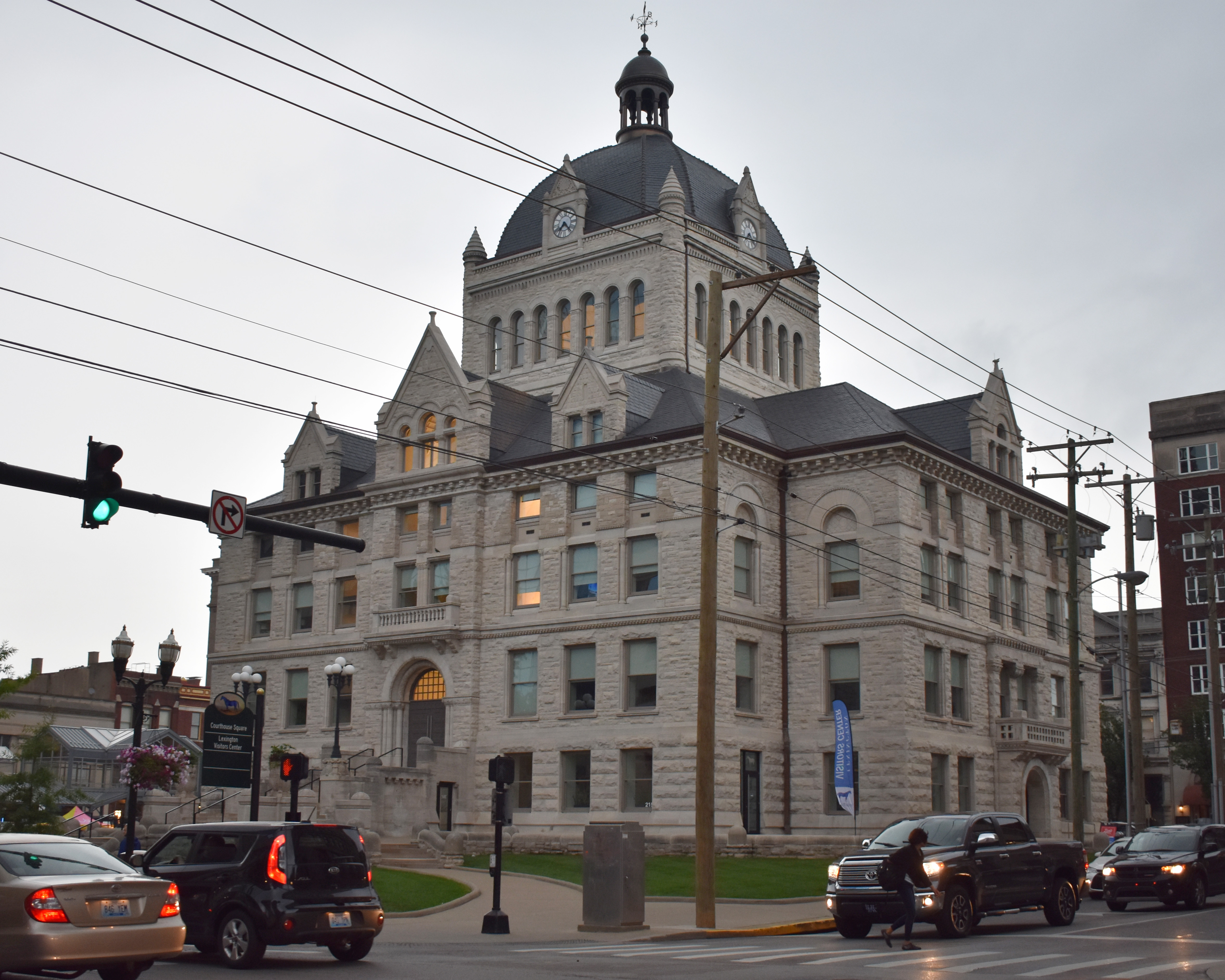
- Interactive map of the Old Fayette County Courthouse area

General information
- Type: Courthouse (original)
- Architectural style: Richardsonian Romanesque
- Location: Lexington, Kentucky, US
- Coordinates: 38°2′52″N 84°29′52″W
- Construction started: 1898
- Completed: 1900
- Client: Fayette County, Kentucky

Technical details
- Structural system: masonry

Design and construction
- Architects: Lehman & Schmitt

The Old Fayette County Courthouse (Kentucky) is a mixed-use commercial and civic office building located at 215 West Main Street in downtown Lexington, Kentucky, United States. It was originally built in 1898–1900 and designed by Cleveland-based architects Lehman & Schmitt, the fifth structure to be used as the Fayette County Courthouse. The building now contains civic offices, event spaces, and commercial retail space. It has been called the "most iconic building in Lexington."

== Description ==
The courthouse occupies one of the most prominent locations in the city of Lexington, close to the exact geographic center of the urban agglomeration, in the Downtown Commercial [Historic] District. It occupies the center of the block bounded by W. Main Street, Cheapside, W. Short Street, and N. Upper Street, and is the only enclosed structure on the block, set off from the surrounding buildings by considerable space as befitting a monumental civic structure. The site slopes downwards from north to south, exposing a basement story on the south (main façade) but hiding it below ground level on the north side.

=== Exterior ===
The plan of the courthouse uses the shape of a Greek cross, although the National Register nomination for the surrounding historic district describes the building's overall volume as "more of a (half-)cube or pyramid with re-entrant angles." The uppermost stories step back from the three at the base to a cubic form of a drum, on top of which sits a bulbous octagonal-plan dome, topped by a bronze lantern.

The four façades of the courthouse have entrances built in the center, topped by round arches, with shallow balconies. On the north and south façades the balconies are supported by amusing grotesque heads. On all sides but the north, a terrace on top of the basement wraps around the structure, and on the south façade in front of the main entrance this opens onto a grand flight of stone steps flanked by two large bronze lamps that sit on richly-carved pedestals. The courthouse rises four stories, including the basement, below the main roofline and its major elements are symmetrical around the north–south axis, with identical windows flanking the central protruding bays on each façade.

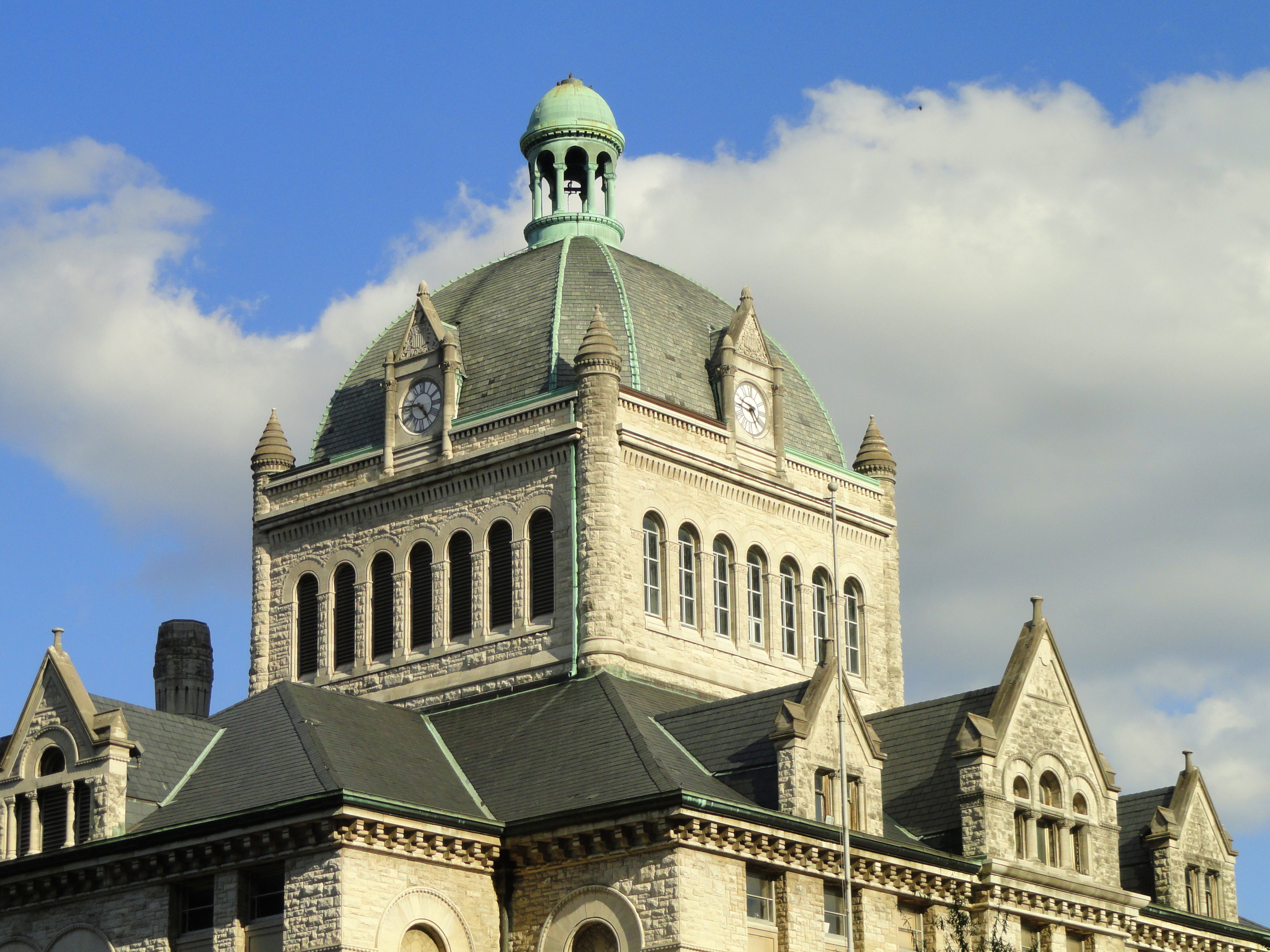
Detail of dome, Old Fayette County Courthouse, 2012.

The building surface uses rough (rusticated) native Kentucky limestone, which is not only a popular building material in the Bluegrass region of central Kentucky, but has made the area famous by ideally enriching its soil with minerals that facilitate the raising of top-quality thoroughbred racehorses. A stone cornice rings the structure at the base of the roof, and on each side the roofline is topped by a central gable. On the south façade three gables top the roofline, with a triple set of round-arched windows laid in it.

The square-plan drum is pierced by a series of tall round-arched windows and framed by four thin round-plan conical towers, one at each corner, which are connected by another elaborated corbelled cornice. Clocks set into gabelled dormers sit at the center of the drum on each façade, behind which an octagonal-plan dome rises in a curved mansard shape to an arcaded, columnar bronze lantern at its summit that uses a bell-shaped cap, originally topped with a horse-shaped weathervane.

The lantern contains a bell that has hung in every Fayette County courthouse since 1806, having survived the destruction of this courthouse's predecessors, many by fire. It is still functional.

=== Interior ===
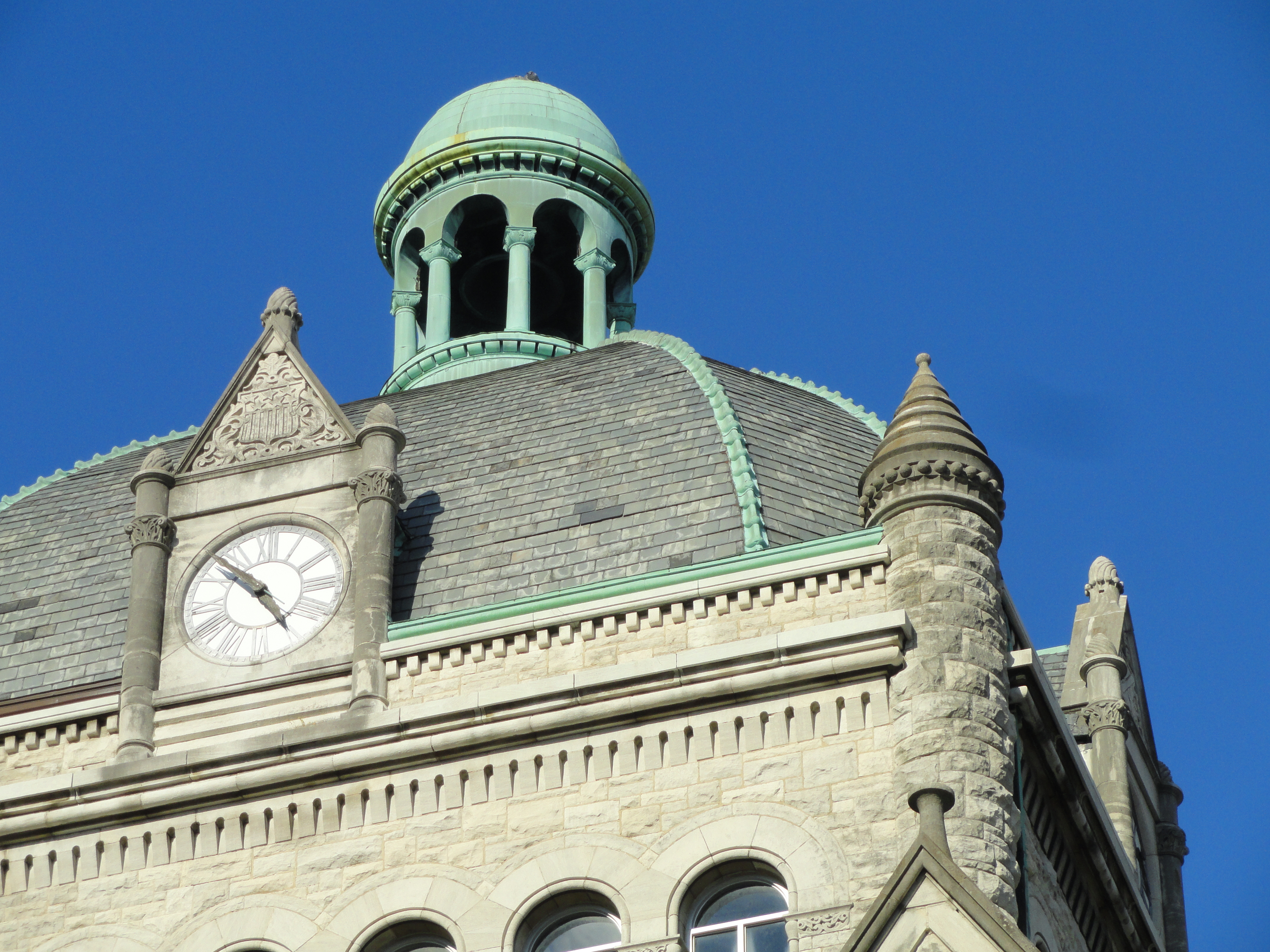
Detail of gables, clocks, dome, and lantern of the Old Fayette County Courthouse.

The interior of the courthouse has changed over the years (see below), but originally was dominated by the great rotunda below the dome. At ground level inside the main entrance sat a grand Y-shaped staircase that led to the second floor, where the main courtroom was originally located. The major rooms, including the courtroom and the offices of county officials, were also well-appointed in carved woods.

The dome rises 105 feet above the ground floor. The interior of its rotunda uses a regular octagonal-plan ceiling that does not match the exterior shell of the dome. The corners of the octagonal ceiling rest on large columns that fit inside the square-plan drum, which is lit by natural light from the tall arched windows piercing the exterior as well as artificial lights installed in the octagonal ceiling. The eight stout columns supporting the ceiling rest on a blind arcade running around the base of the drum. This arcade itself rests on a string cornice undergirded by arched corbels.

Currently, the ground floor includes Zim's Café and the VisitLEX Visitor Center. Municipal offices are located on the two floors above, with a large rentable space for special events located on the top floor below the rotunda.

== History ==
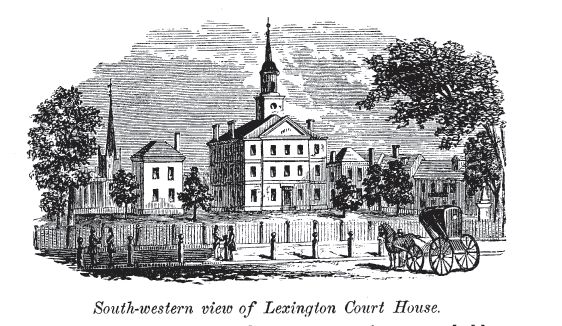
The third Fayette County Courthouse, ca. 1865. The 1898 courthouse replaced this building's successor.

The Old Courthouse sits on the site of its two immediate predecessors. Fayette County's first courthouse, which was not located there, was erected in 1782. The four previous courthouses were all destroyed—some purposely, some by tragic accident—and no vestiges of them survive. The previous courthouse, built in 1887 and designed by Thomas Boyd, used a neoclassical style with a central dome and also faced W. Main Street to the south. It was destroyed by fire on May 14, 1897, apparently while a group of fifth-grade students were taking a final exam, though the students all made it out of the building safely. Immediately the government of Fayette County undertook to build the present structure.

=== Design and construction ===
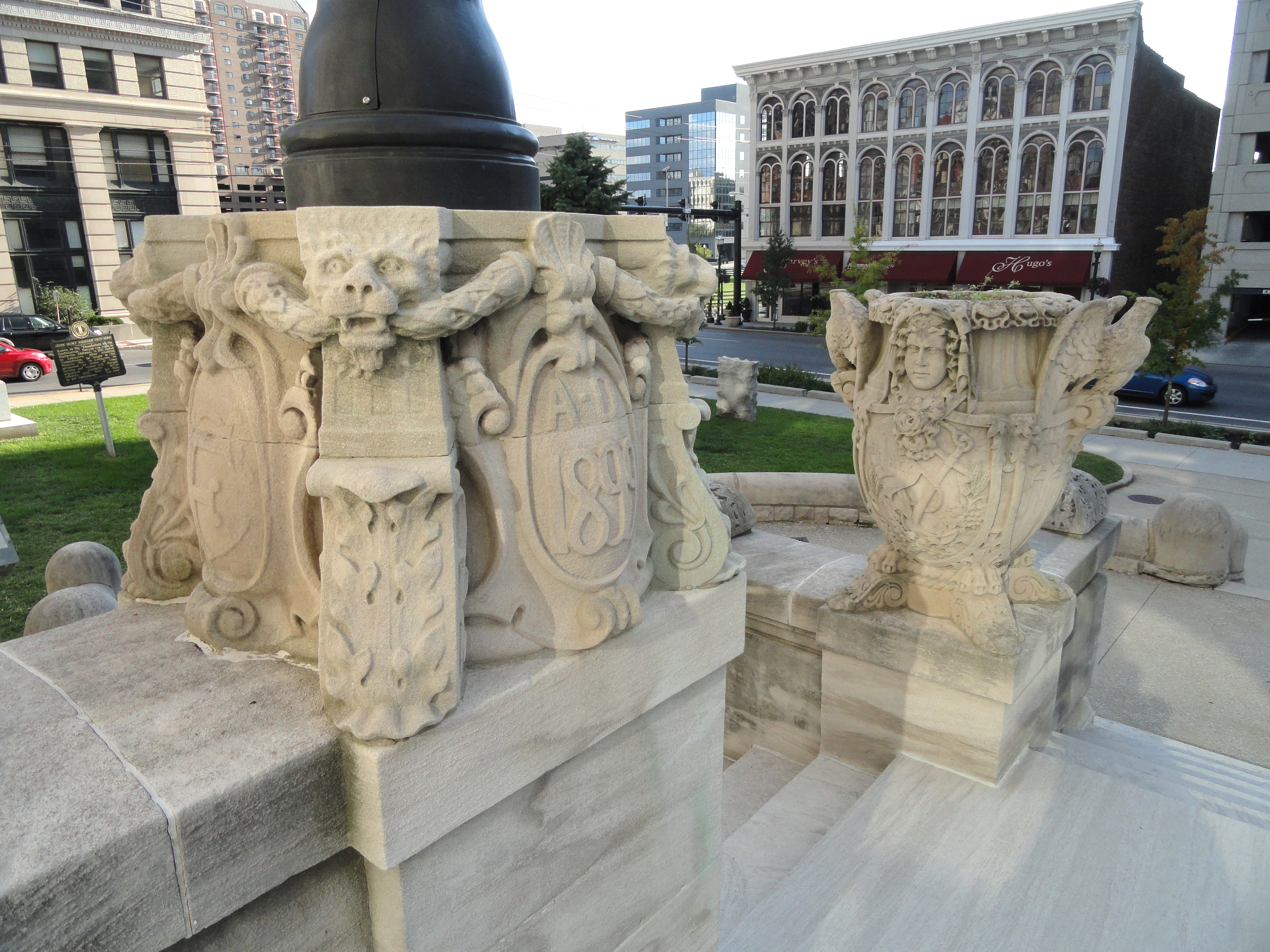
Bases of lampposts and flower urns lining the entrance staircase to the Old Fayette County Courthouse, 2012

The current courthouse was designed by Cleveland architects Lehman & Schmitt, apparently their only commission in Kentucky. They were, however, responsible for several other courthouses in Ohio, including the Cuyahoga County Courthouse in Cleveland (1912), a prominent example of Beaux-Arts neoclassicism influenced greatly by the American City Beautiful Movement. Lehman and Schmitt chose a Richardsonian Romanesque style for the courthouse. The building is one of the very few (and by far the most impressive) of the courthouses in Kentucky that use this strand of Romanesque-revival architecture, so named for its introduction to the United States in the 1870s by Boston-based architect H.H. Richardson. The National Register nomination for the Lexington Downtown Commercial District quotes the architects at the dedication of the structure in February 1900 as declaring that "the style of architecture should be characteristic of the purpose for which the building design is used. It should be severe, and yet of proper characteristic to impress the eye by proper harmony of lines and beauty of proportion rather than by detail or showy ornament or eccentric treatment."

Construction started in 1898 by Howard, Woods & Clarke Construction and the building was finished at the start of February 1900. George Clarke was a prominent and successful builder in Kentucky and built several homes and buildings for University of Kentucky. One notable building was the Amory. The first court business was held in the new structure on February 3. The building cost a total of US$323,000 (about $12.22 million in 2022 dollars).

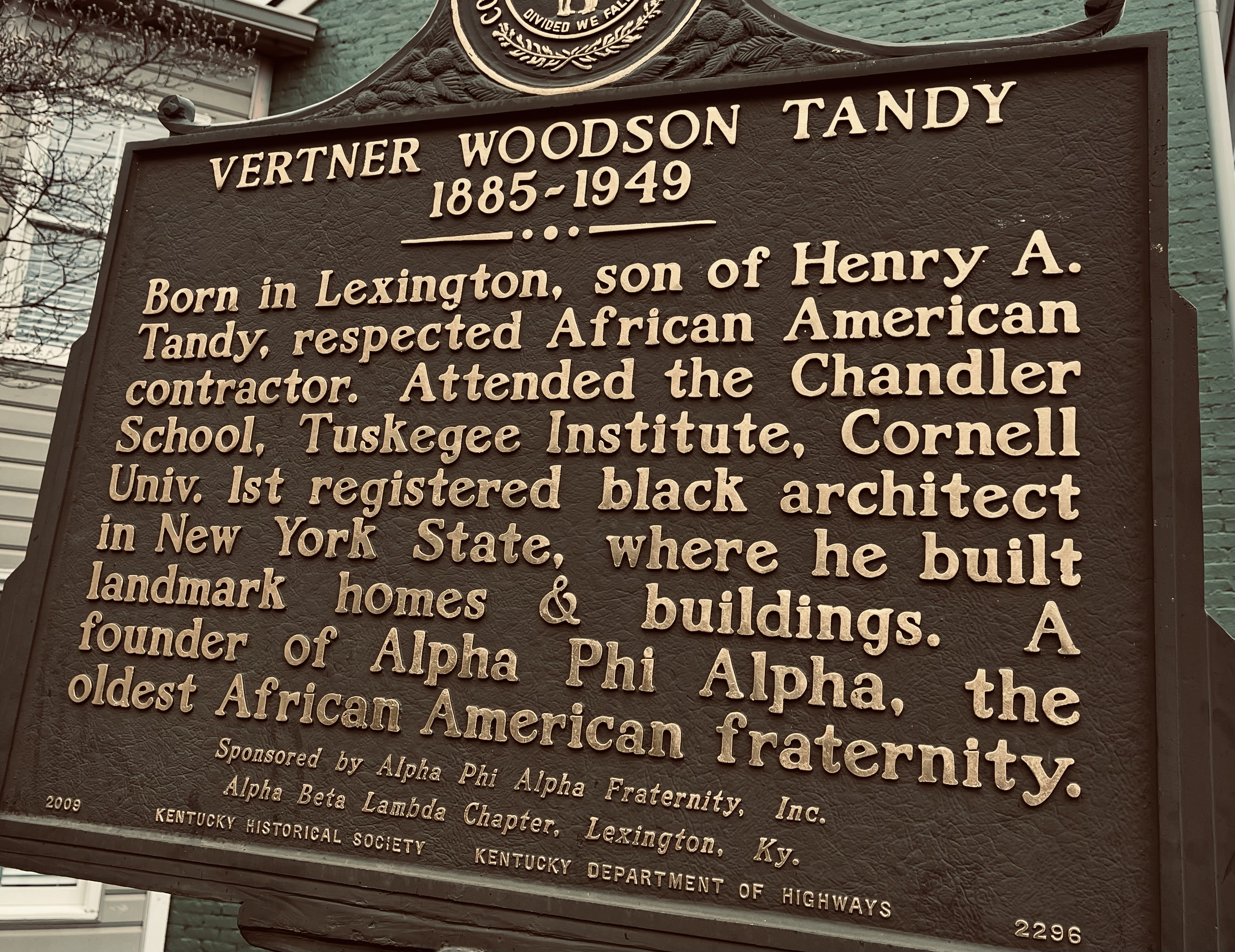
Historic marker commemorating Tandy & Byrd and Vertner Tandy on grounds of Old Fayette County Courthouse, Lexington.

Many companies were involved in the building's construction, and are listed on two marble plaques in the main entrance hall of the courthouse. The Superintendent of Construction was the Lexington company of J.R. Williamson, while the actual construction was completed by contractors Howard, Woods & Clarke, also of Lexington. The brickwork and of the masonry was laid by Tandy & Byrd of Lexington, a prominent and very successful African-American building firm; since 2020 the Cheapside Park adjacent to the west façade of the courthouse has been named Henry A. Tandy Centennial Park in honor of one of its named partners. A state historic marker next to the courthouse celebrates Tandy and his son, Vertner Woodson Tandy, who later became the first African-American architect in the state of New York.

There is a Corner Stone set with a time capsule add behind the corner stone at the time construction was complete 1900, set in stone on the front right corner of the Court House.

=== Alterations ===
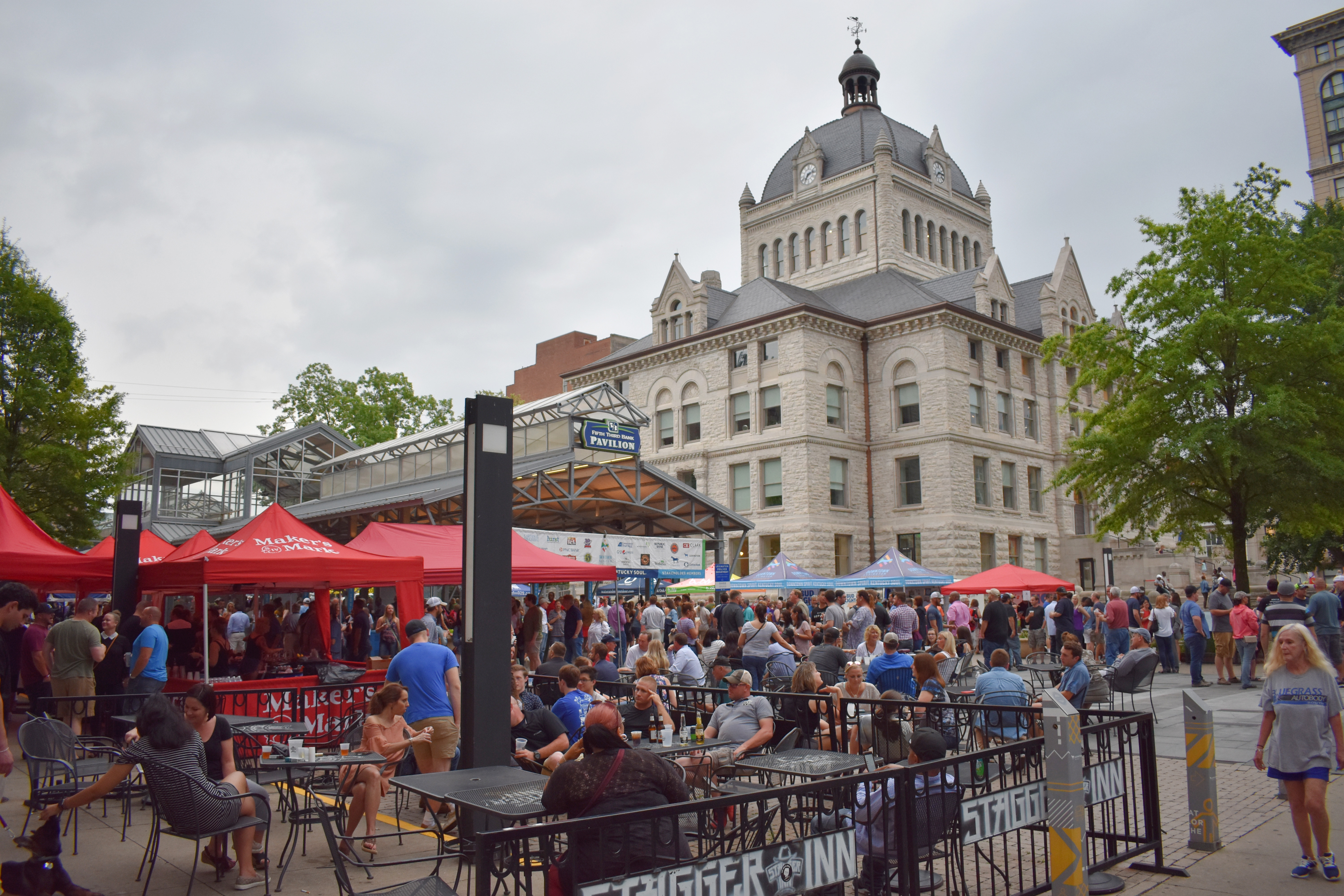
The Old Fayette County Courthouse sits adjacent to Henry A. Tandy Centennial Park, formerly known as Cheapside, often used for civic events and festivals.

The courthouse became subject to pressure from an increase in court business during the 1950s, as only one courtroom was available for a caseload that normally required five. Moreover, the building had been originally constructed without air conditioning. In 1951, plans were floated by the County Commissioner and the Lexington Chamber of Commerce to demolish the building in the face of serious opposition to build a large new complex including businesses, county offices, courtrooms, the jail, a parking lot and a separate underground parking garage.

These efforts failed, but between September 1960 and September 1961, and again in 1972, the courthouse underwent significant modifications. The grand staircase was dismantled, the space of the courtrooms and other offices on the second floor were redistributed and remodeled, losing most of their original decor, and the rotunda was covered in order to install a new air conditioning system. These created, according to local journalists reporting in 1980, a series of "labyrinthine, low-ceilinged, and poorly-lit interior corridors." In addition, a fourth floor was inserted below the roof, and as a result the windows on the third floor of the south façade lost their arches to accommodate windows for this additional floor above. Nonetheless, the building was included in the survey of Lexington's Downtown Commercial [Historic] District when it was conducted in the early 1980s and filed with the National Park Service in August 1983.

=== Conversions ===
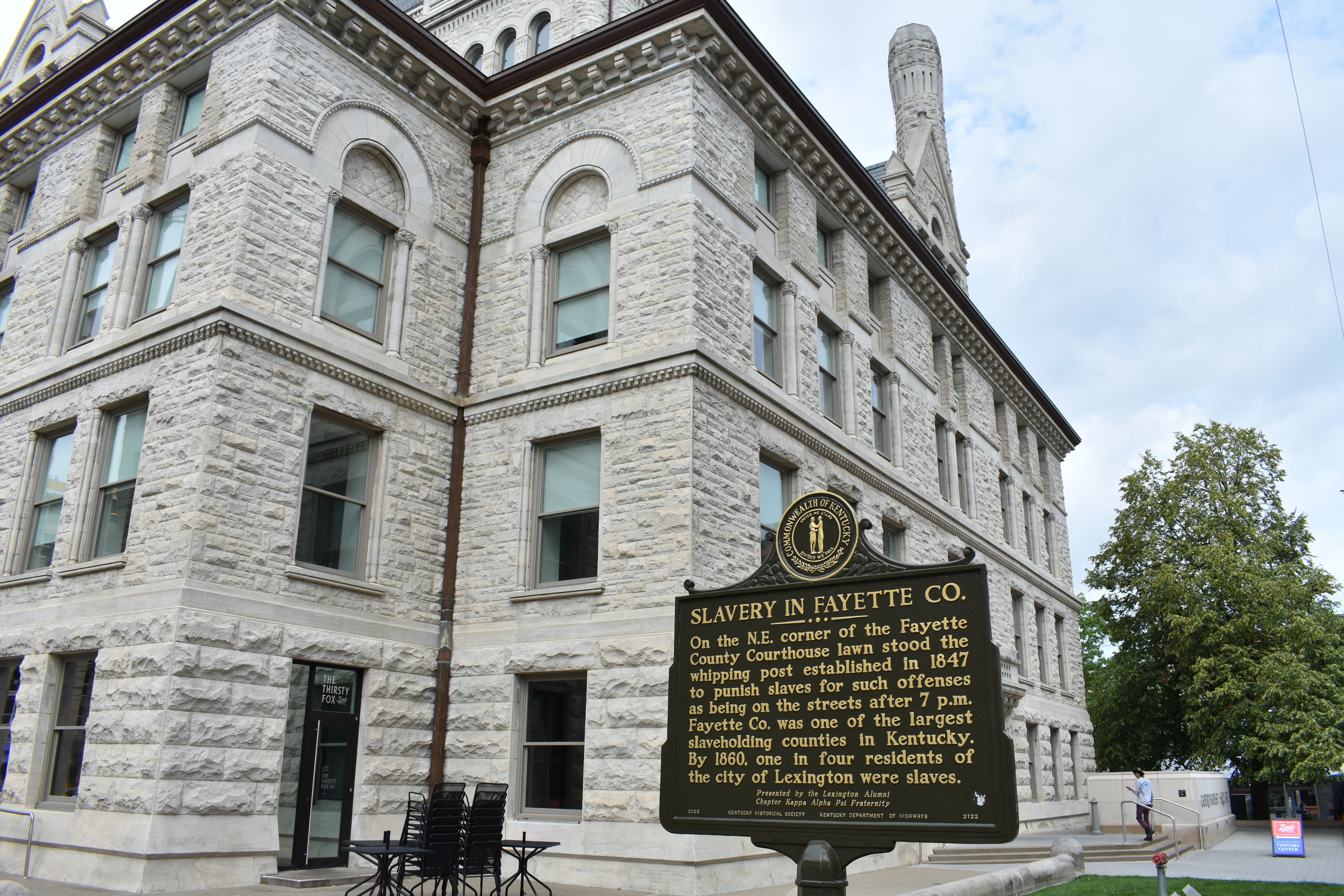
Historic marker describing history of slavery in Fayette County, Kentucky, on the grounds of the Old Fayette County Courthouse.

Fayette County finally moved its courts out of the building in 2001 to a new, much larger court complex several blocks away on North Limestone. The Old Courthouse was reopened in October 2003 under a memorandum of understanding between the Commonwealth of Kentucky and the Lexington-Fayette Urban County Government stipulating that the consolidated municipal/county government would spend a minimum of $1,000,000 (~$1.63 million in 2024) to renovate the structure to house the Lexington History Center, an amount that was never actually paid in full. The courthouse went through a piecemeal renovation to house a collection of four institutions under this umbrella name. These included the Lexington Public Safety Museum, dedicated to police, fire, and corrections services; the Kentucky Renaissance Pharmacy Museum, dedicated to the history of early pharmacies in the state; the Isaac Scott Hathaway Museum, focusing on African-American history; and the largest, the Lexington History Museum, founded in 1998 and dedicated more generally to local history.

In 2012, the museums were forced to vacate the Old Courthouse when the Urban County Government discovered hazardous lead paint and mold as part of an environmental survey. The building then sat vacant as the city-county government debated what to do with the structure, finally deciding in 2016 to renovate it. In 2017–18, the building underwent a $33 million (~$41.4 million in 2024) rehabilitation, aided by both Federal and state Historic Tax Credits. The Old Courthouse reopened in late 2018 as a multi-purpose structure that integrates a municipal visitor center, cafés, civic offices, and special event spaces. The renovations uncovered the interior of the rotunda, although the grand staircase and original interiors of the courtroom were not restored. A ribbon-cutting ceremony was held in November 2018, during which Lexington mayor Jim Gray stated, "We knew the good bones were here, but the bones had to be rearranged into something modern, inviting and compelling. Whatever we did here needed to be a beacon for the future and not just a curio of the past."

== Confederate monuments ==
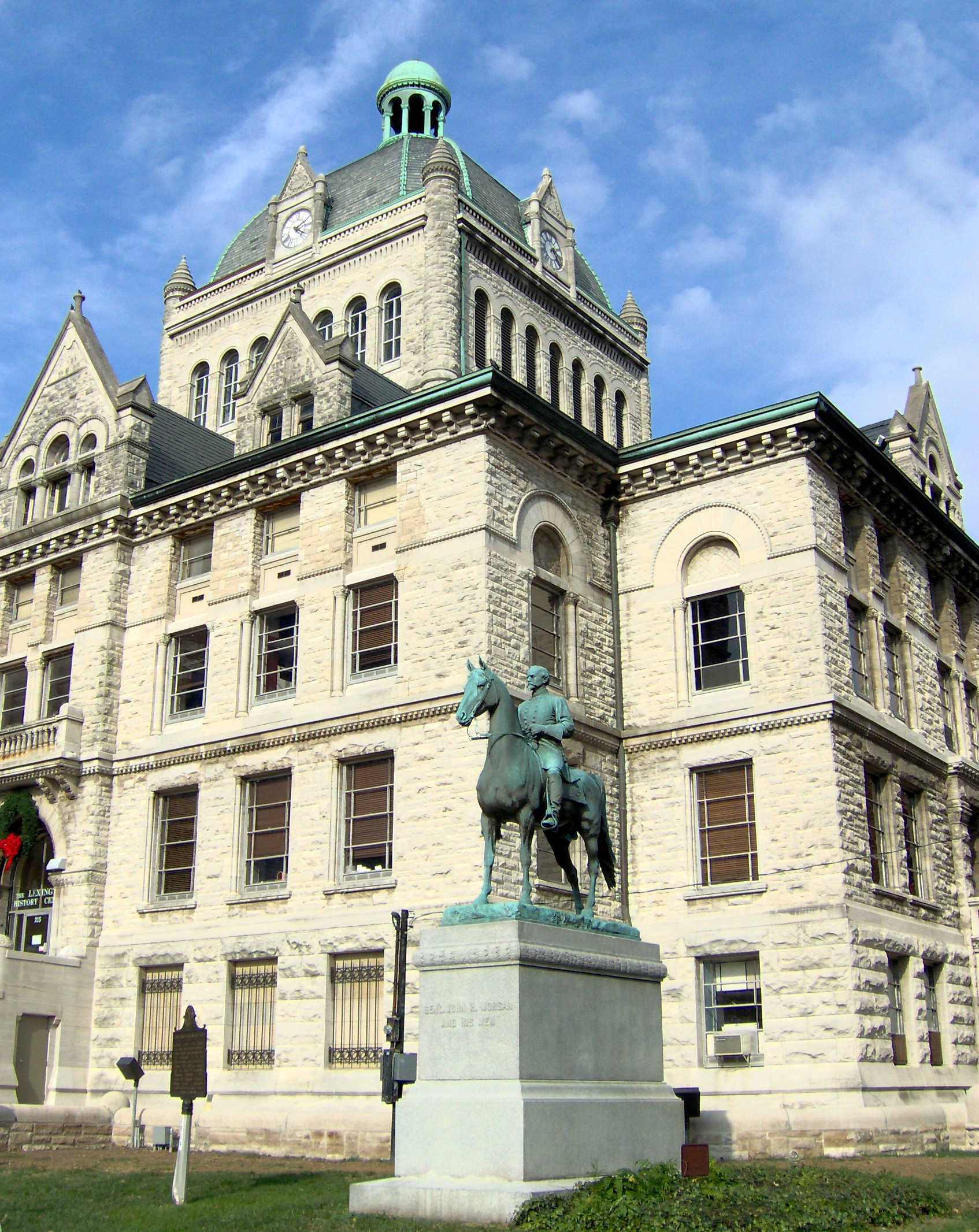
John Hunt Morgan equestrian monument in front of the Old Fayette County Courthouse, facing W Main Street, 2010.

The courthouse was built adjacent to Cheapside Park, the former site of slave auctions and trading during the nineteenth century; these had ceased by 1866 with the abolition of slavery. However, in 1887, a memorial statue of Kentuckian John C. Breckinridge, the Confederate States Secretary of War, was erected on the lawn of the Courthouse that included Cheapside Park, in honor of a man who had served the traitorous seceding Confederate states that sought to perpetuate slavery in the United States. It was joined by an equestrian monument to Confederate general John Hunt Morgan in 1911. The statues were moved closer to Main Street in front of the Old Courthouse in 2010, as part of the renovation of Cheapside into a multipurpose entertainment pavilion. These statues had been erected as part of an effort to enforce white supremacy and perpetuate anti-black racism during the nadir of American race relations at the turn of the twentieth century.

In November 2015, the Urban County Arts Review Board recommended the removal of both statues as part of the larger reconsideration of Confederate monuments in the United States. The monuments were removed on October 17, 2017, and eventually relocated to Lexington Cemetery west of downtown, where they were placed at the gravesites of Morgan and Breckinridge, respectively.
