= Oscar Cobb =

American architect

Oscar Cobb (1842-1908) was an American architect of theaters and more. Several of his works are listed on the U.S. National Register of Historic Places.

== Works ==
Works (with variations in attribution) include:

- DuPont-Whitehouse House, built in 1875 and 1876 by Oscar Cobb & Co.; designated a Chicago Landmark in 1996.
- Sioux City Municipal Auditorium, designed by architects James W. Martin and Oscar Cobb in Romanesque Revival style
- Fox Theater, 1116–1128 Main St., Stevens Point, Wisconsin (Cobb, Oscar), NRHP-listed
- Masonic Temple Building, 36–42 N. Fourth St., Zanesville, Ohio (Cobb, Oscar & Son), NRHP-listed
- Opera House and Yates Bookshop Building, 141 and 145 N. Broadway, Lexington, Kentucky (Cobb, Oscar), NRHP-listed
- Soldiers and Sailors Memorial Building and Madison Theater, 36 Park Ave., W., Mansfield, Ohio (Cobb, Oscar), NRHP-listed
- Lexington Opera House
- Cincinnati Shubert theater
- One or more works in Mathias Mitchell Public Square-Main Street Historic District, roughly Main St. from Strongs Ave. to Second St., Stevens Point, Wisconsin (Cobb, Oscar), NRHP-listed
- One or more works in Wellington Historic District, irregular pattern along Main St. from Kelley St. to W and L E RR Wellington, Ohio (Cobb, Oscar), NRHP-listed Wellington Town Hall (1885, National Register)
- A grand opera house in Syracuse, New York
- A grand opera house in St. Paul, Minnesota
- A grand opera house in Minneapolis, Minnesota
- Grand Opera House (1885), St. Louis
- Grand Opera House (1893), Ashland, Wisconsin
