= Lexington Opera House =

Theater in Lexington, Kentucky

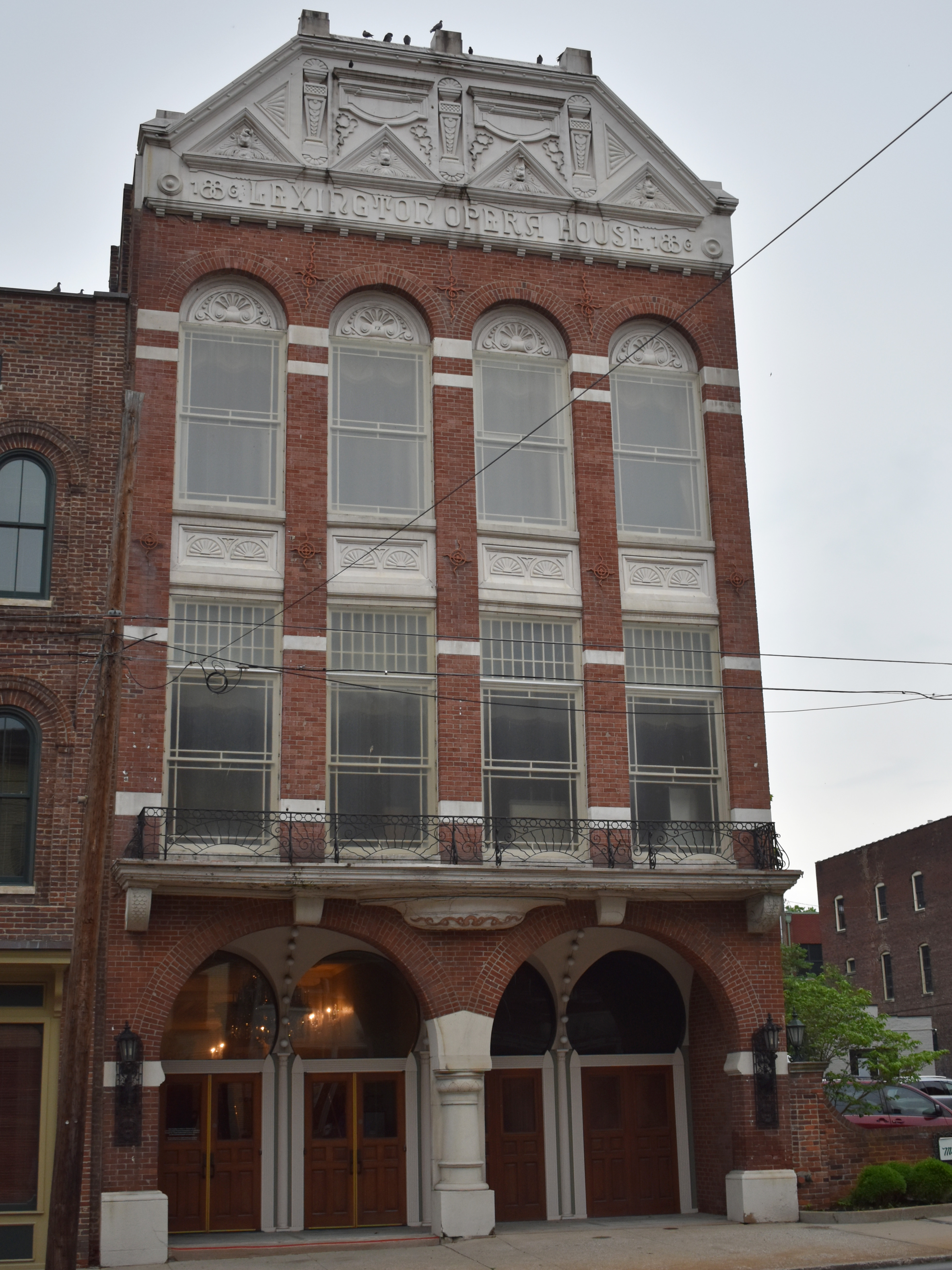
- Interactive map of Lexington Opera House
- Address: 401 West Short Street
- Location: Lexington, Kentucky
- Coordinates: 38.0499°N 84.4990°W
- Owner: Lexington Center Corporation
- Capacity: 1,000
- Type: theatre

Construction
- Opened: July 19, 1887
- Architect: Oscar Cobb

Website
- www.lexingtonoperahouse.com

The Lexington Opera House is a theatre located at 401 West Short Street in downtown Lexington, Kentucky. Built in 1886, the Opera House replaced the former theatre, located on the corner of Main and Broadway, after fire destroyed it in January 1886. The new Opera House was designed by the renowned architect Oscar Cobb and is listed on the National Register of Historic Places for its historical and architectural significance. It is currently owned and operated by the Lexington Center Corporation, and it hosts ballets, opera, children's productions, family shows, comedy, music and professional national Broadway tours. The Lexington Opera House is one of 14 theatres in the country built before 1900 with less than 1,000 seats that is still in operation as a live performance venue.

== History ==
The Lexington Opera House officially opened on July 19, 1887, with a concert by the Cincinnati Symphony, and in August hosted its first production of Our Angel by the Lizzie Evans Stock Company. Following the production, the Opera House quickly received widespread attention throughout the region. Over the years, the Opera House hosted a variety of notable performances with famous acts including Al Jolson, W.C. Fields, Will Rogers, Harry Houdini, Lillian Russell, Sarah Bernhardt and many more.

Distinguished performances with elaborate details solidified the Opera House's popularity. In 1890, the production of Henley Regatta flooded the stage and the majority of the performance took place in rowboats; then, in 1893, the Country Circus featured 100 animals in a mile-long parade. For the production of Ben Hur, significant remodeling occurred to house an on-stage chariot race. The Kentucky Equal Rights Association (KERA) often used the Opera House for mass meetings, hosting famous international suffragists: Rev. Anna Howard Shaw spoke on November 17, 1904; Grace Abbott of Hull House, Chicago spoke on Universal Suffrage Day, May 2, 1914; socialist and pacifist Vicountess Ethel Snowden, of England on November 8, 1915; and English suffragist Emmeline Pankhurst on January 7, 1920, for the 30th and last of the KERA conventions.

The Opera House continued to successfully provide entertainment throughout the region for a quarter of a century. But, with cultural changes on the rise, the Opera House was unable to sustain management due to a decline in profits. The development of automobiles, radio entertainment and motion pictures mounted a myriad of obstacles that led to the downfall of live productions.

The last live performance in the Opera House was The Arabian, in 1926. Soon after, the transformation into a movie house was launched. A false ceiling was attached to block off everything above the first balcony, and the box seats were enclosed with plasterboard. Occasionally, vaudeville and burlesque shows performed until 1936.

The Harry Schwartz family was confident in the Opera House's conversion into a movie house. Price Coomer went to work for Harry Schwartz in 1930 and bought the house from him in 1955. Coomer remodeled the house and fortunately saved it from the first wrecker's ball. In 1961, under the urban renewal project, the Opera House was scheduled to be demolished, but in due course the Opera House was not torn down, rather a windbreak that protected the theatre was removed.

In 1968, a windstorm caused the false ceiling to collapse, which raised attention for leaders in the urban renewal project to demolish the theatre. Then in 1973, a second windstorm caused the roof of the building to collapse. The dilapidated theatre was not seen as valuable and was only a third-run movie house during that time.

Private and public campaigns were established to educate and inform the public regarding the history and tradition of the Opera House's significance to the community. Building inspectors determined that it would be cheaper to renovate the Opera House for $2.5 million than to reconstruct a new building for $7 million. The Opera House was purchased by the city as part of the Lexington Center Corporation and was provided financial assistance from the Opera House Fund, Inc. The fund was developed by local philanthropists William T. Young and George and Linda Carey.

The Opera House Fund, Incorporated, was founded in 1974 and is a non-profit community service that is dedicated to assisting the Lexington Center Corporation in support of the Lexington Opera House. The fund supports the Opera House through the presentation of professional touring artists on the Broadway Live and Variety Live series, as well as a subsidy program for local performing arts groups.

== Architecture ==
Oscar Cobb of Chicago designed the three-story building and the Broadway Real Estate Company awarded the architecture-construction contract to H.L. Rowe of Lexington. Contributing the stone masonry was previously enslaved Henry A. Tandy, whose firm's work includes other city historic architecture such as the Fayette County Courthouse.

The theatre originally seated 1,250 people and was constructed of two balconies with two boxes on each side of the stage. The theatre consisted of two parts: a 3,360 square-foot auditorium and a 2,220 square-foot stage area. The Opera House had intricate design work. The 596 seats were upholstered with Turkish Morocco and velvet, and each box included its own hat rack, cane and umbrella holder. There were 250 gaslights, 37 sets of scenery and a drop curtain. The stage featured innovations such as the Edison light board and a series of trap doors to enable animals to be used during productions. To avoid another fire, the Opera House had standpipes with water pressure and hose connections that could flood the stage, if needed.

In 1975 the rehabilitation of the Opera House, led by the Lexington Center Corporation, began by removing the false ceiling, reopening the two balconies and restoring to the boxes. The stage was reconstructed and updated to house modern stage equipment, but the Edison light board was restored for historical purposes. The renovation was completed in 1976. The restored theatre has fewer than 1,000 seats, hosts 85,000 patrons annually, and is one of the smallest theatres in the country to host touring Broadway shows.
