= Greenwood =

Green wood is unseasoned wood.

Greenwood or Green wood may also refer to:

== People ==
- Greenwood (surname)

== Settlements ==
=== Australia ===
- Greenwood, Queensland, a locality in the Toowoomba Region
- Greenwood, Western Australia, a suburb of Perth

=== Canada ===
- Greenwood, Calgary, Alberta, a neighbourhood
- Greenwood, British Columbia, a city
- Greenwood, Nova Scotia, a village
- Greenwood, Halifax County, Nova Scotia, a community in the Halifax Regional Municipality
- Greenwood, Durham Regional Municipality, Ontario
- Greenwood, Renfrew County, Ontario

=== United States ===
- Greenwood, Arizona
- Greenwood, Arkansas
- Greenwood, California (disambiguation)
- Greenwood Village, Colorado, a city
- Greenwood, Delaware
- Greenwood, Florida
- Greenwood, Georgia
- Greenwood, Idaho
- Greenwood, Illinois
- Mount Greenwood, Chicago, Illinois
- Greenwood, Indiana, a city in Johnson County
- Greenwood, Wayne County, Indiana
- Greenwood, Wells County, Indiana
- Greenwood, Louisville, Kentucky
- Greenwood, former name of Erlanger, Kentucky
- Greenwood, Louisiana
- Greenwood, Maine
- Greenwood, Massachusetts
- Greenwood, Marquette County, Michigan
- Greenwood, Minnesota
- Greenwood, Mississippi micropolitan area
- Greenwood, Mississippi
- Greenwood Springs, Mississippi
- Greenwood, Missouri
- Greenwood, Nebraska
- Greenwood, New York
- Greenwood, Tulsa, Oklahoma
- Greenwood, Pennsylvania
- Greenwood, Franklin County, Pennsylvania
- Greenwood, South Carolina
- Greenwood, Charles Mix County, South Dakota
- Greenwood, Lawrence County, South Dakota
- Greenwood, Clarksville, Tennessee
- Greenwood, Midland County, Texas
- Greenwood, Parker County, Texas
- Greenwood, Wise County, Texas
- Greenwood, Albemarle County, Virginia
- Greenwood, Bath County, Virginia
- Greenwood, Washington
- Greenwood, Seattle, Washington
- Greenwood, Boone County, West Virginia
- Greenwood, Doddridge County, West Virginia
- Greenwood, Fayette County, West Virginia
- Greenwood, Morgan County, West Virginia
- Greenwood, Wisconsin, a city in Clark County
- Greenwood, Taylor County, Wisconsin, a town
- Greenwood, Vernon County, Wisconsin, a town
- Greenwood (community), Vernon County, Wisconsin, an unincorporated community

== Electoral districts ==
- Greenwood (Ontario federal electoral district), a former federal district in Ontario
- Greenwood (Ontario provincial electoral district), a defunct provincial riding
- Greenwood (British Columbia electoral district), British Columbia

== Historic buildings ==
- Greenwood (Alexandria, Alabama), an Antebellum plantation house
- Greenwood (Columbia, Missouri), a house
- Greenwood (Fayette, Missouri), also known as the Estill-Parrish House
- Greenwood (Memphis, Tennessee), also known as Beverly Hall, a mansion
- Greenwood (Culpeper, Virginia), a plantation house
- Greenwood (Orange, Virginia), a house
- Greenwood Elementary School (Terre Haute, Indiana), Terre Haute, Indiana, US
- Greenwood Lodge, Grand County, Colorado, US
- Greenwood Museum, Smyrna, New York, US
- Greenwood Plantation (disambiguation)

== Other uses ==
- Greenwood (bank), an American digital bank
- Greenwood Branch, a river in New Jersey
- Greenwood International, a timber trader from The Netherlands
- Greenwood Publishing Group
- Greenwood Raceway, a defunct harness horse-racing track in Toronto
- Greenwood Terrace, a public housing estate in Chai Wan, Hong Kong
- CFB Greenwood, an RCAF/Canadian Forces base located near the village of Greenwood
- GreenWood, an amusement park in Wales
- Green Wood Centre, Shropshire, formerly the Greenwood Trust, a centre for the coppice revival
- "Greenwood", a song by Peter, Paul and Mary from the 1986 album No Easy Walk to Freedom

== See also ==
- Greenwood Academy (disambiguation)
- Greenwood Cemetery (disambiguation)
- Greenwood College School, a day school in Toronto, Ontario
- Greenwood County (disambiguation)
- Greenwood Farm (disambiguation)
- Greenwood High School (disambiguation)
- Greenwood Lake (disambiguation)
- Greenwood Plantation (disambiguation)
- Greenwood River (disambiguation)
- Greenwood station (disambiguation)
- Greenwood Township (disambiguation)
- Greenwoods, a menswear store chain
- North Greenwood, historically African American neighborhood in Clearwater, Florida
