= Greenwood, West Virginia =

Greenwood, West Virginia may refer to:

- Greenwood, Boone County, West Virginia, an unincorporated community
- Greenwood, Doddridge County, West Virginia, an unincorporated community
- Greenwood, Fayette County, West Virginia, a ghost town
- Greenwood, Morgan County, West Virginia, an unincorporated community
