= Greenwood Plantation =

Greenwood Plantation may refer to:

- Greenwood Plantation (Alexandria, Alabama) in Alexandria, Calhoun County, Alabama
- Greenwood Plantation (Georgia) in Thomas County, Georgia
- Greenwood Plantation (Culpeper, Virginia) in Culpeper, Virginia
- Samuel R. Pitts Plantation, also known as the Greenwood Plantation in Pittsview, Russell County, Alabama

== See also ==
- Butler Greenwood Plantation in St. Francisville, Louisiana
- Greenwood (disambiguation)
