= Greenwood micropolitan area =

The Greenwood micropolitan area may refer to:

- The Greenwood, Mississippi micropolitan area, United States
- The Greenwood, South Carolina micropolitan area, United States

== See also ==
- Greenwood (disambiguation)
