= Greenwood, Virginia =

Greenwood, Virginia may refer to:

- Greenwood, Albemarle County, Virginia
- Greenwood, Bath County, Virginia
