= Greenwood, Michigan =

Greenwood may refer to the following unincorporated communities in the U.S. state of Michigan:

- Greenwood, St. Clair County, Michigan
- Greenwood, Marquette County, Michigan
- Greenwood, Ogemaw County, Michigan

== See also ==
- Greenwood Township, Michigan (disambiguation)
- Greenwoods, Michigan
