= Greenwood, Kentucky =

Greenwood, Kentucky, may refer to:

- Greenwood, Louisville, a neighborhood
- Erlanger, Kentucky, previously known as Greenwood
- Greenwood, Pendleton County, Kentucky
