= Charles Greenwood =

Charles Greenwood may refer to:

- Charles Greenwood (Wisconsin politician) (1852–1925), American businessman and politician
- Charles Greenwood (pastor) (1891–1969), Pentecostal Christian pastor in the Assemblies of God
- Charles O. Greenwood, American farmer and member of the Idaho House of Representatives
