= Greenwood, Wisconsin (disambiguation) =

Greenwood, Wisconsin may refer to:

- Greenwood, Wisconsin, a city in Clark County, Wisconsin
- Greenwood, Taylor County, Wisconsin, a town
- Greenwood, Vernon County, Wisconsin, a town
