= Greenwood Cemetery =

Greenwood Cemetery may refer to the following cemeteries in the US (sorted by state, then city):

- Greenwood Cemetery (Montgomery, Alabama)
- Greenwood Cemetery (Tuscaloosa, Alabama)
- Greenwood Cemetery (Orlando, Florida)
- Greenwood Cemetery (Tallahassee, Florida)
- Greenwood Cemetery (Atlanta), Georgia
- Greenwood Cemetery (Galena, Illinois)
- Greenwood Cemetery (Rockford, Illinois)
- Greenwood Cemetery Chapel, Muscatine, Iowa
- Greenwood Cemetery (Council Grove, Kansas)
- Greenwood Cemetery in Lexington, Kentucky, predecessor of Cove Haven Cemetery
- Greenwood Cemetery (Shreveport, Louisiana)
- Greenwood Cemetery, New Orleans, Louisiana
- Greenwood Cemetery (Birmingham, Michigan)
- Greenwood Cemetery (Jackson, Mississippi)
- Greenwood Cemetery (Hillsdale, Missouri)
- Greenwood Cemetery, Boonton, New Jersey
- Green-Wood Cemetery, Brooklyn, New York
- Greenwood Cemetery (Hamilton, Ohio)
- Greenwood Cemetery (Philadelphia), Pennsylvania
- Greenwood Cemetery (Pittsburgh), Pennsylvania
- Old Greenwood Cemetery, Greenwood, South Carolina
- Greenwood Cemetery (Nashville, Tennessee)
- Greenwood Cemetery (Dallas), Texas
- Greenwood Cemetery (Waco), Texas, a racially segregated cemetery
- Greenwood Cemetery (Wheeling, West Virginia)

== See also ==
- Greenwood (disambiguation)
- Greenwood Memorial Park (disambiguation)
