= Greenwood, Texas =

Greenwood, Texas may refer to:

- Greenwood, Midland County, Texas
- Greenwood, Wise County, Texas
- Greenwood, Hopkins County, Texas
- Greenwood, Red River County, Texas
- Greenwood, Parker County, Texas
- Greenwood, Van Zandt County, Texas
