= Greenwood High School =

Greenwood High School can refer to several educational institutions in the United States:

- Greenwood High School (Arkansas)
- Greenwood High School (Indiana)
- Greenwood High School (Kentucky), in Bowling Green
- Greenwood High School (Mississippi)
- Greenwood High School (South Carolina)
- Greenwood High School (Texas), in Midland

== See also ==
- Greenwood High International School, Bengaluru, Karnataka, India
- Greenwood (disambiguation)
- Greenwood Academy (disambiguation)
