= Greenwood Academy =

Greenwood Academy may refer to:

- Greenwood Academy, Birmingham, a secondary school in Birmingham, West Midlands, England
- Greenwood Academy, Dreghorn, a secondary school in Dreghorn, North Ayrshire, Scotland
- Greenwood Academies Trust, a multi-academy trust in the English Midlands.

== See also ==
- Greenwood (disambiguation)
- Greenwood High School (disambiguation)
