= Gathright Dam =

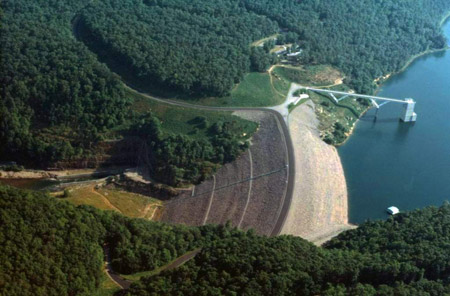
- Gathright Dam

- Location within Virginia
- Location: Alleghany County, near Kincaid, Virginia
- Coordinates: 37.9726054°N 79.9641174°W
- Construction began: 1974
- Opening date: 1979
- Operator: U.S. Army Corps of Engineers

Dam and spillways
- Type of dam: Embankment, rock-fill
- Impounds: Jackson River
- Height: 257 feet (78 m)
- Length: 1,310 feet (400 m)
- Width (base): 32 feet (9.8 m) (crest) 1,000 feet (300 m) (base)

Reservoir
- Creates: Lake Moomaw
- Total capacity: Normal: 40 billion US gallons (150,000,000 m^{3}) Max: 137 billion US gallons (520,000,000 m^{3})
- Catchment area: 345 square miles (890 km^{2})
- Surface area: 3.9 square miles (10 km^{2})

Gathright Dam is an earthen and rolled rock-fill embankment dam on the Jackson River 19 miles (31 km) north of Covington, Virginia. The dam is 257 feet (78 m) tall and 1,310 feet (400 m) long and has a controlled spillway within the structure's southern portion. It creates Lake Moomaw, which has a normal volume of 40 billion US gallons (150,000,000 m^{3}). The dam serves flood control and recreational purposes and is operated by the U.S. Army Corps of Engineers.

The Gathright Dam's intake tower contains nine portals that allow it to release water between reservoir depths of 12 to 87 feet (3.7 to 26.5 m). This allows the dam to manage the temperature and flow of water released downstream. This helps mitigate some of the negative environmental effects posed by the dam and manage fisheries downstream.

Lake Moomaw is surrounded by protected forest land within the George Washington and Jefferson National Forests. The recreational areas of the lake include campgrounds, hiking trails, a manmade beach area, and boating launches. The lake is home to naturally occurring and stocked fish, including bass, trout, catfish, crappie and perch.

== History and construction ==
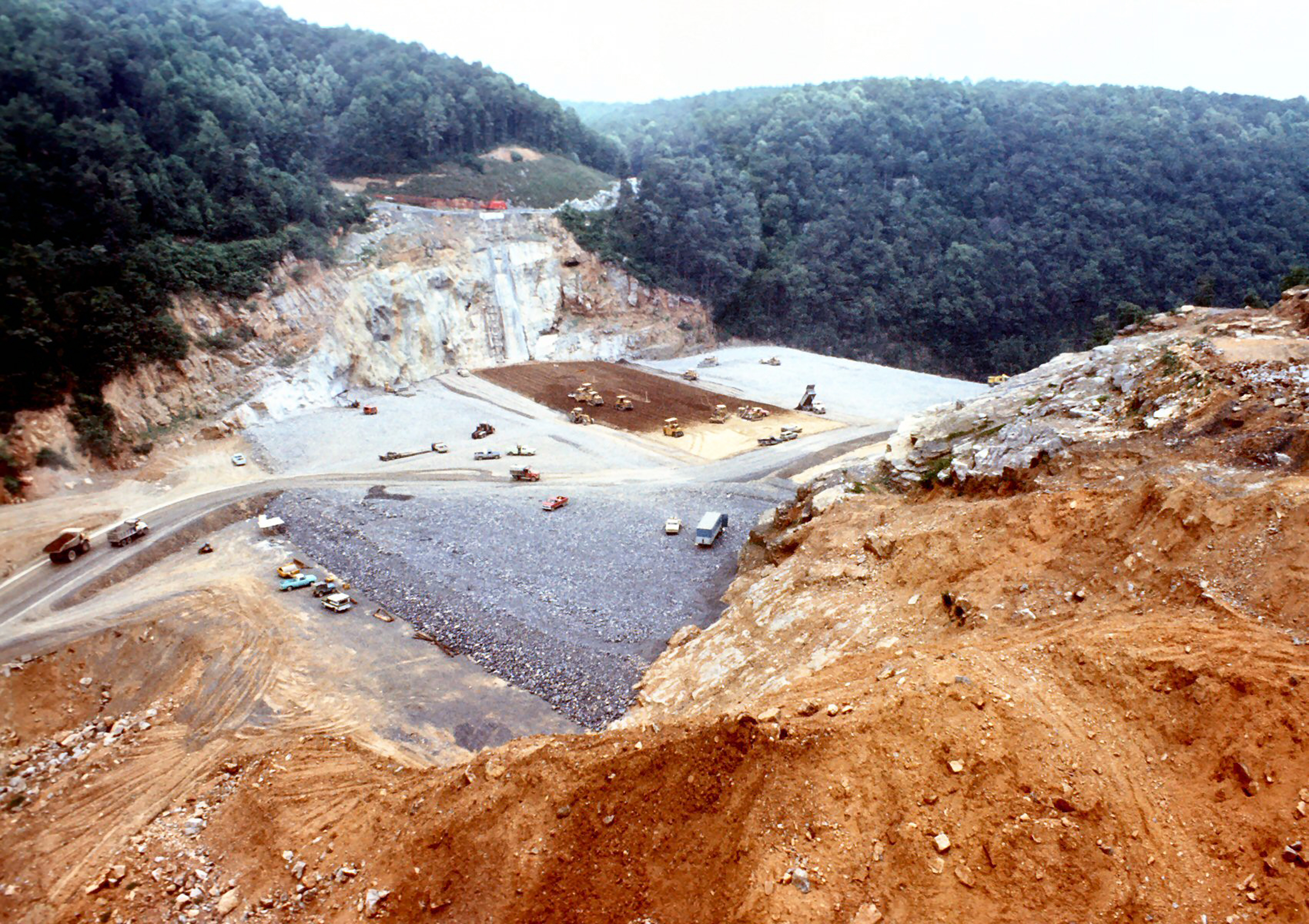
Gathright Dam construction

The Gathright Dam was authorized by Congress with the Flood Control Act of 1946 to provide flood protection of industrial, commercial and residential properties along the Jackson and James Rivers, with immediate impact on Covington, Virginia. Benjamin Cline Moomaw, Jr., a Virginian businessman who was influential in gaining approval for the project and is known locally as "the Father of the Gathright Dam" is the namesake for the lake. The dam itself is named after Thomas Gathright, who owned the land that was flooded by the reservoir.

Because of setbacks though, construction did not begin until 1974. The dam was finished in 1979 and that December, Lake Moomaw began to fill. The reservoir was filled by April 1982. Filling of the reservoir displaced the small town of Greenwood which had been located at what is now the southern part of Lake Moomaw.

The reservoir reached its highest elevation in 1996 at 1,598 ft (487 m) above sea-level.

Environmentalists and the EPA challenged the plan for construction on grounds that the scenic Kincade Gorge and important historical and archaeological sites would be destroyed by the lake. Contesting parties suggested that the dam was constructed for the benefit of the Westrock paper mill downstream from the dam in Covington that relied on a regular flow of water to operate.

== Instability concerns ==
In May 2009, the U.S. Army Corps of Engineers (USACE) inspected the Gathright Dam as part of Screening Portfolio Risk Analysis and routine inspections. Later in the year on September 2, the USACE assigned the dam a Safety Action Classification (DSAC) II which is defined as "Urgent (Unsafe or Potentially Unsafe)". The rating is attributed to concerns about possible increased seepage at the toe of the dam, and an undetermined flow rate at the river spring one-quarter mile (0.40 km) downstream, and potential flow channels through limestone below the spillway during pool events above 1,600 feet (490 m).

Because of this rating, the USACE has implemented risk reduction measures which include increased monitoring, updating emergency operation plans and reducing the water level in the reservoir. As of early 2010, the USACE has reduced and continues to maintain the reservoir at an elevation of 1,562 ft (476 m) above sea level compared to the normal level of 1,582 ft (482 m). Throughout 2010, the USACE conducted safety exercises with local/state officials, conduct a series of investigations on the dam, update inundation mapping and reevaluate the DSAC status. In November 2010, Lake Moomaw was restored to a level of 1,582 ft (482 m) and the DSAC will be reevaluated in the future.

== Gallery ==
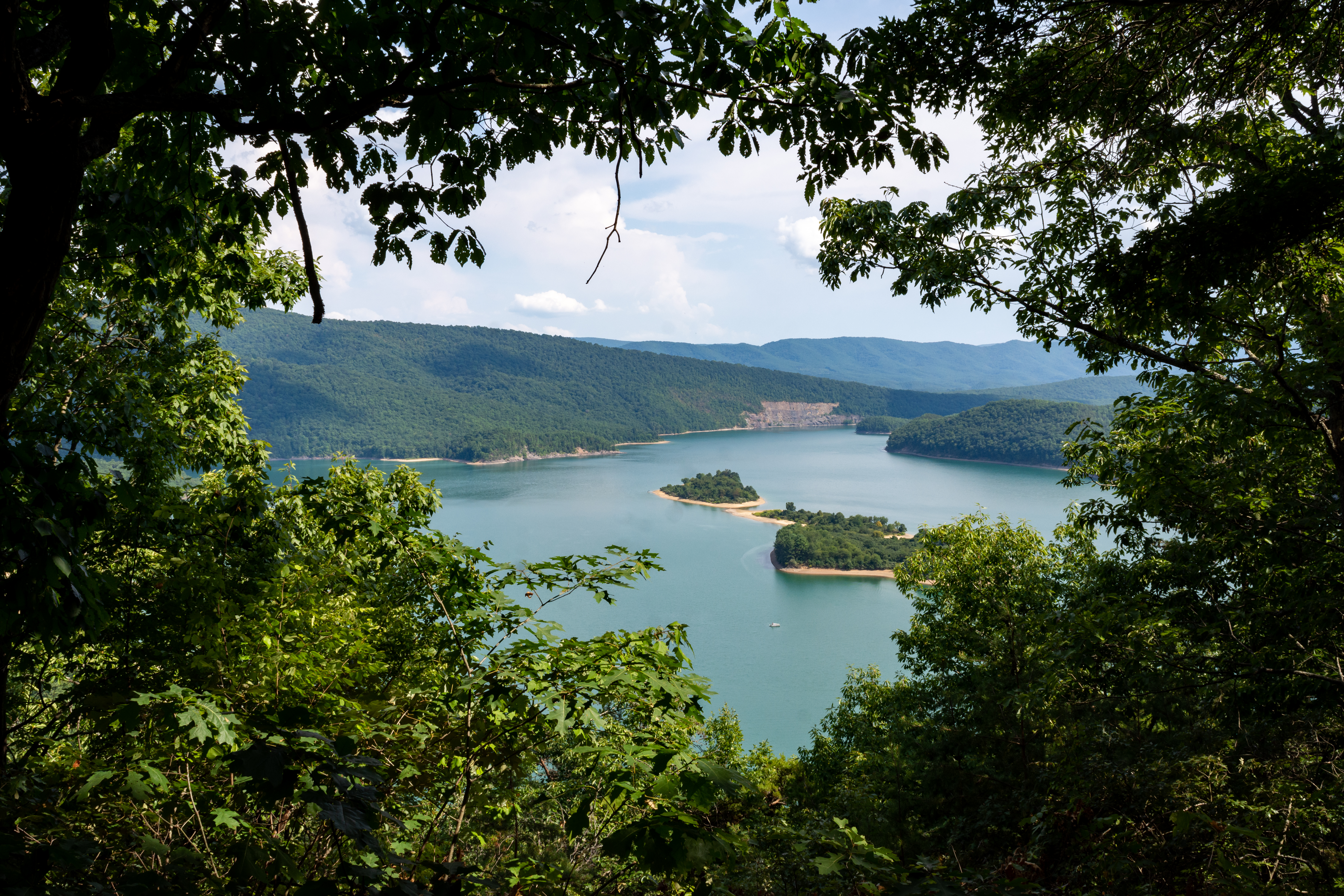
Lake Moomaw as seen from the Bolar loop trail

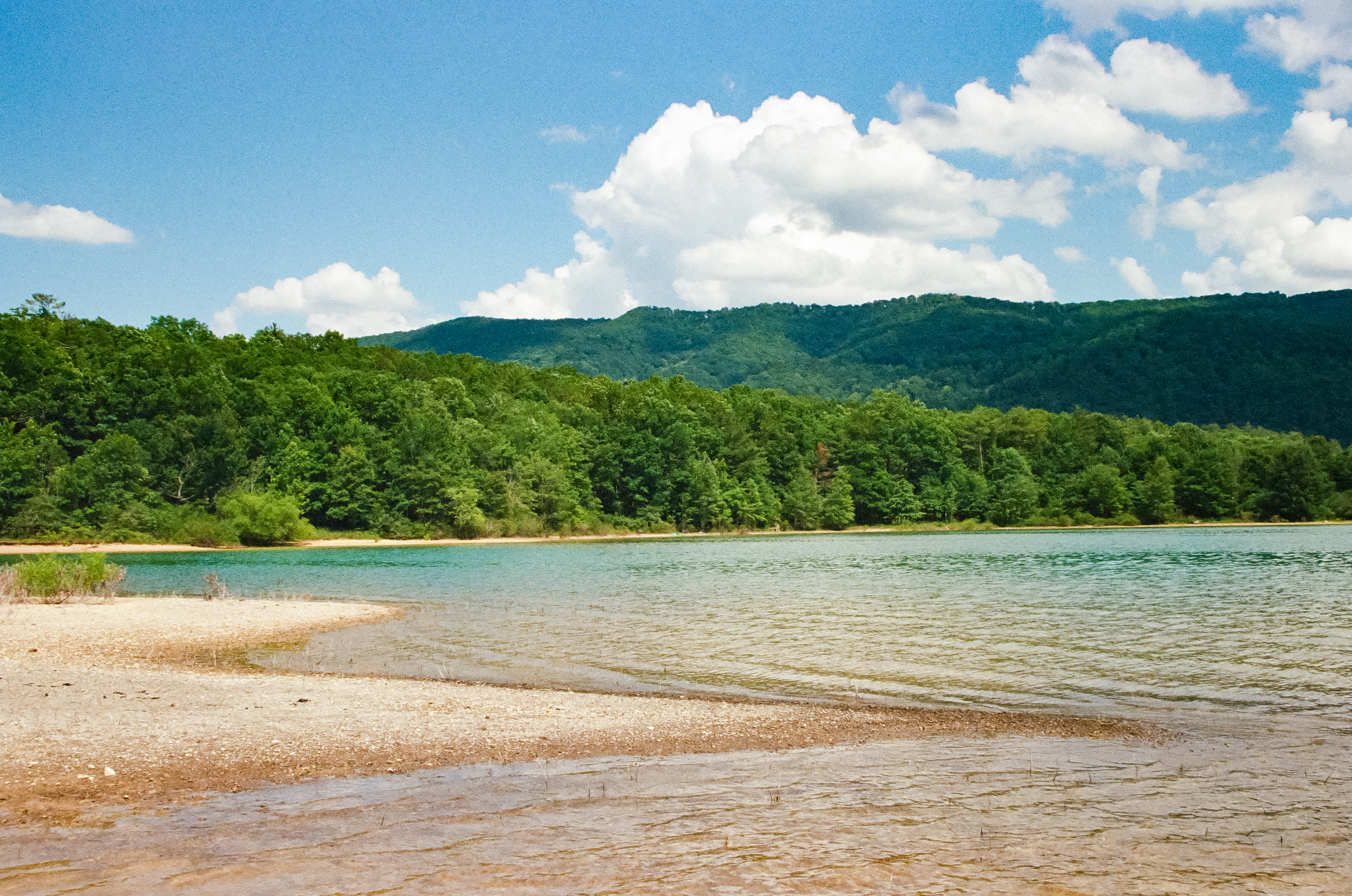
The shores of the lake, further extended due to the fluctuating water levels over the course of the summer months

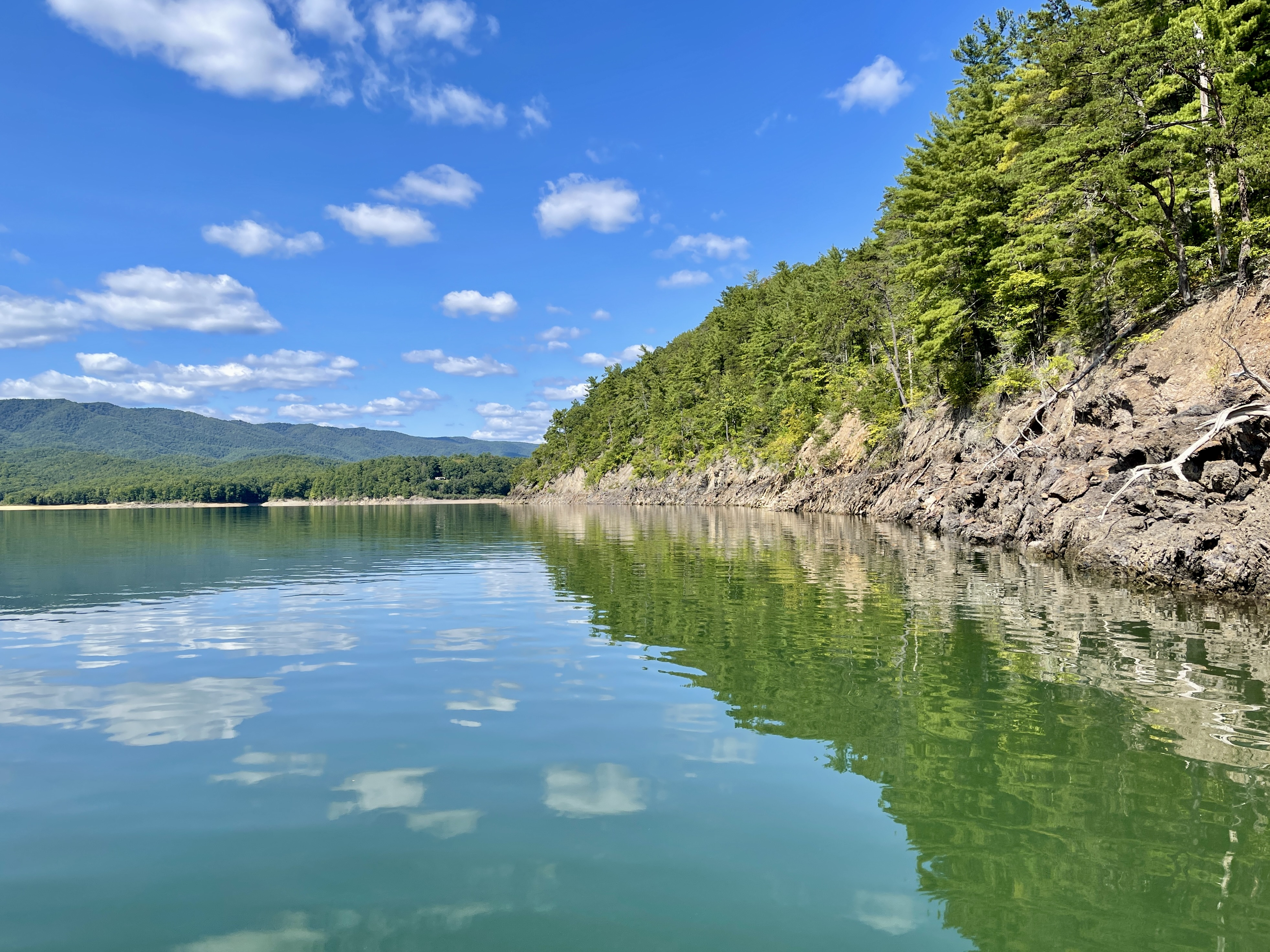
Geological features of the lake

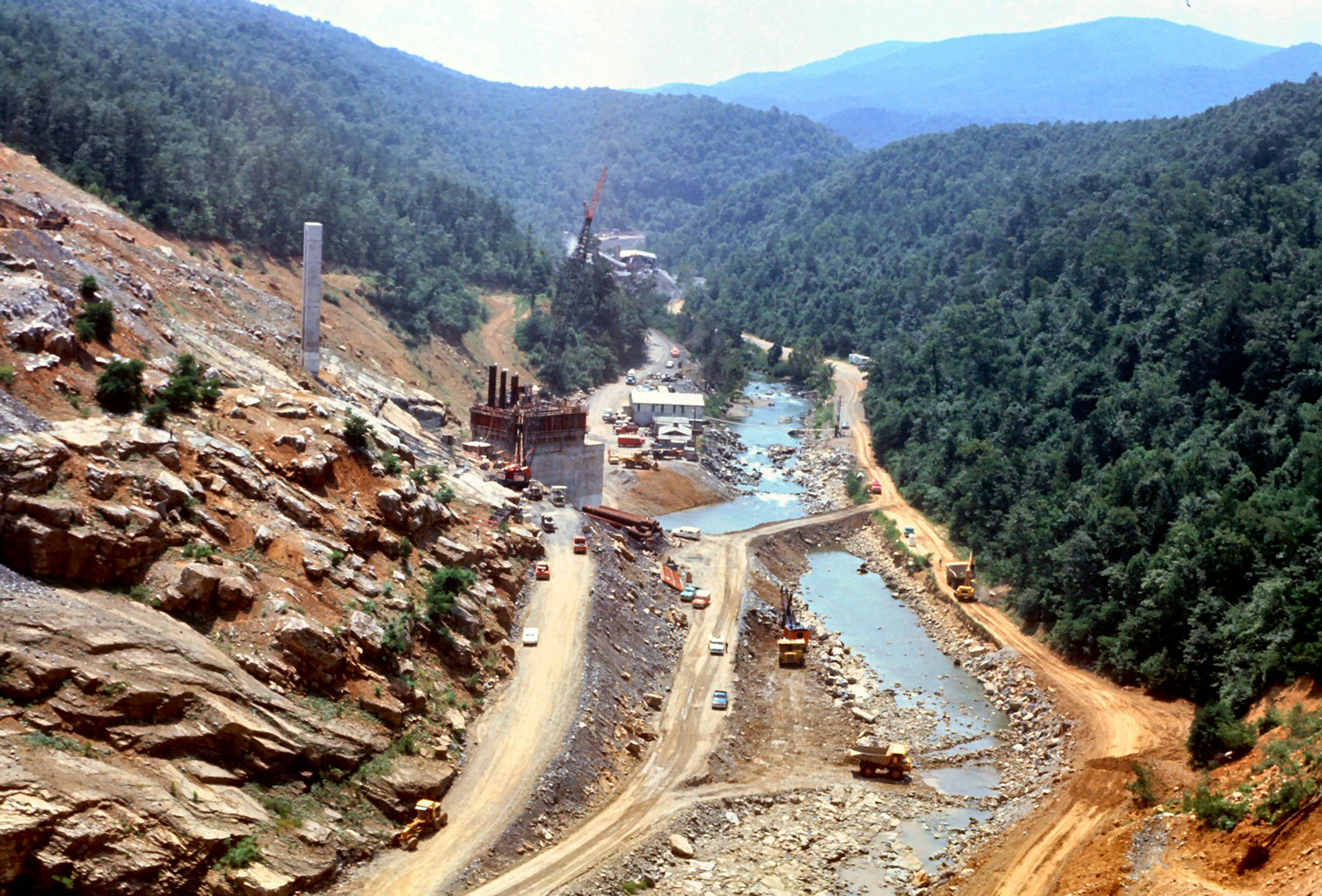
The location of the Gathright Dam in the early stages of construction

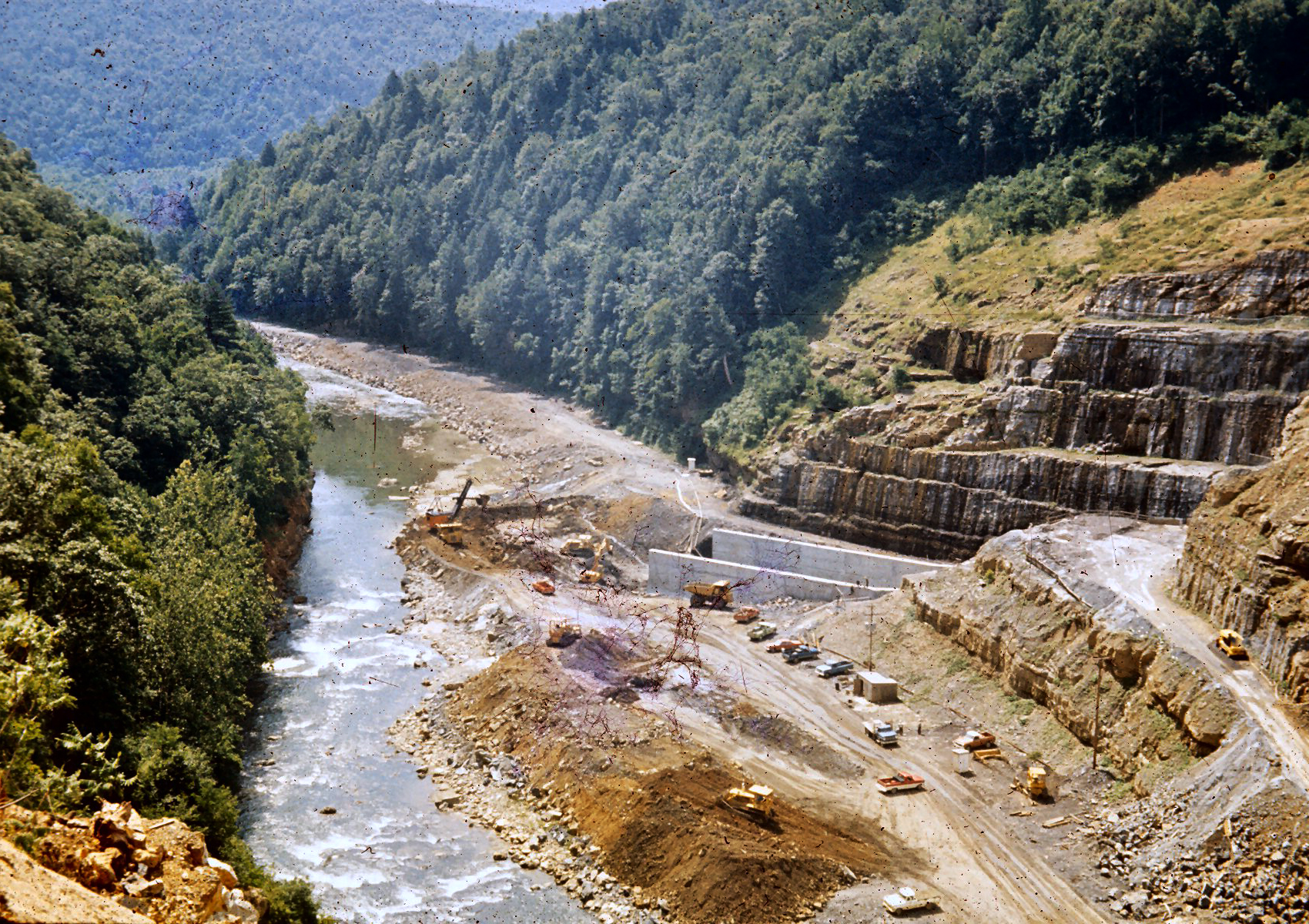
Stilling basin of the dam

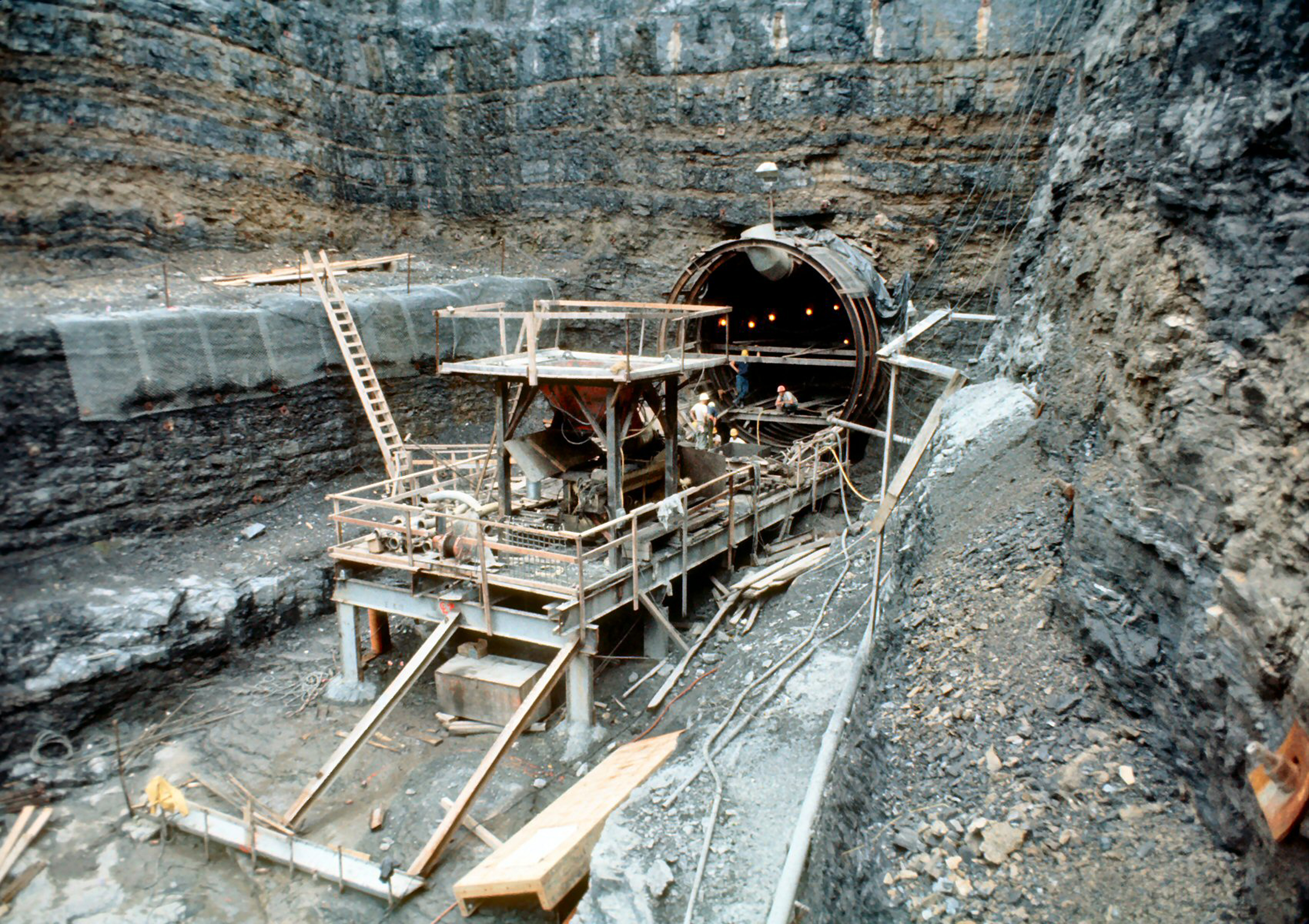
Construction on the stilling basin

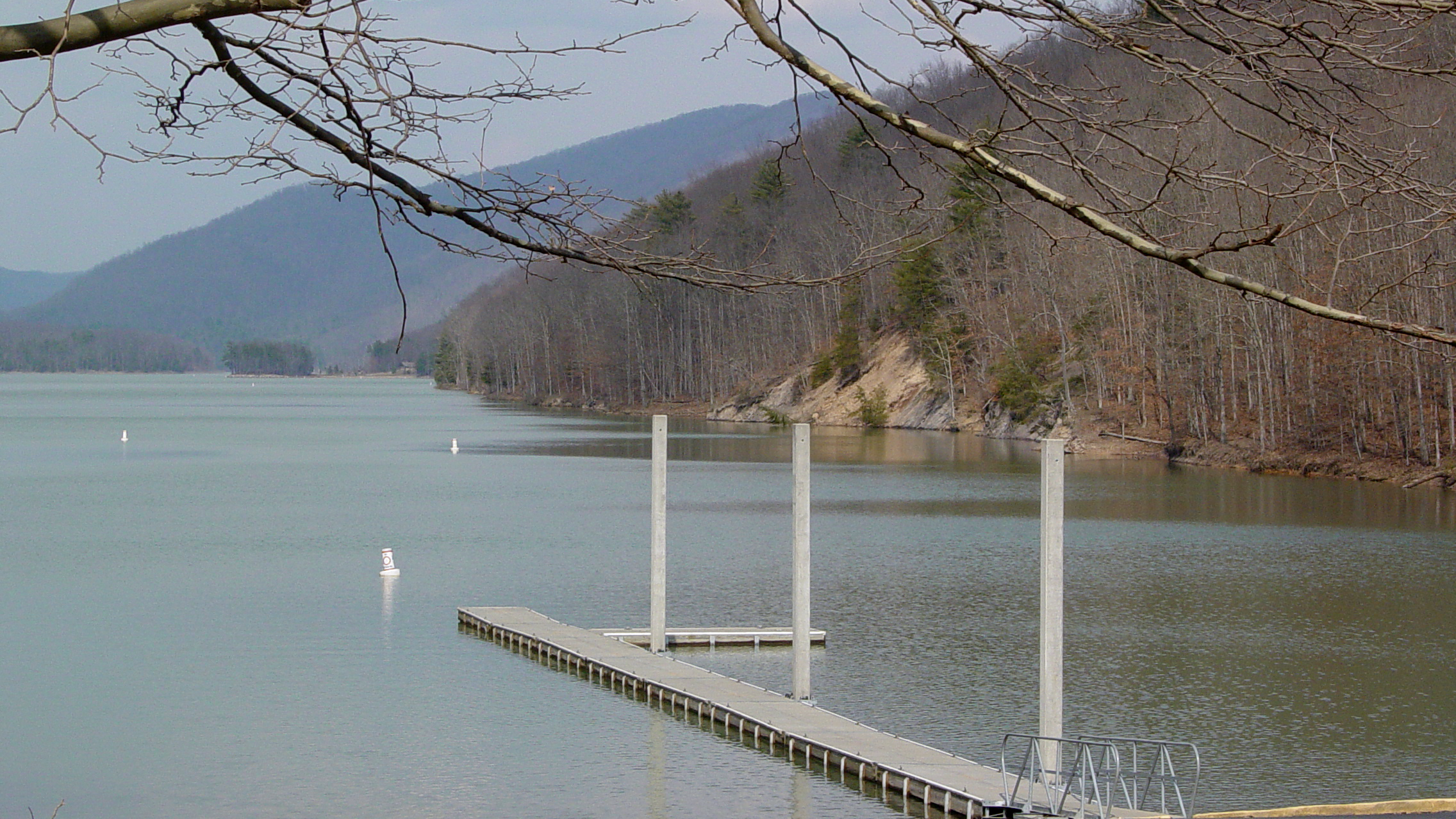
Boat launch at Lake Moomaw

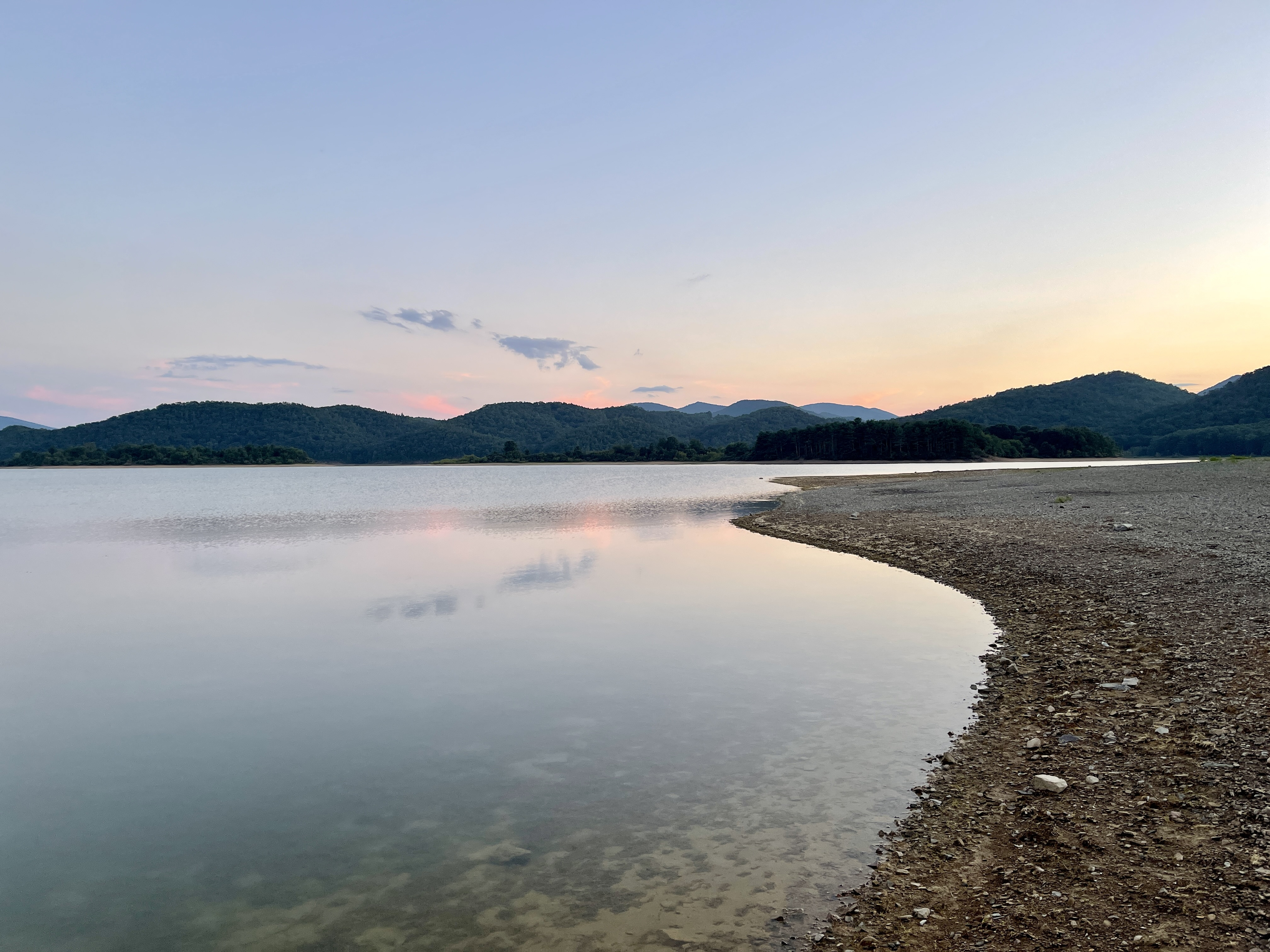
Lake Moomaw sunset
