= Annie Pike Greenwood =

Annie Amelia Pike Greenwood (November 16, 1879 – February 22, 1956) was an American author, educator, and farmer. Born in Utah, she settled in the Magic Valley region of Idaho near Hazelton, Idaho, in 1913 with her husband, Idaho politician Charles O. Greenwood. Her 1934 autobiography We Sagebrush Folks documented Idaho pioneer way of life and her experiences as a farmer's wife; she also wrote for several magazines, including The Atlantic Monthly and The Nation.

== Life ==
Annie Amelia Pike was born on November 16, 1879, at the Utah Territorial Insane Asylum in Provo, Utah, where her father was the superintendent. Her parents were Hattie (née Drice) and Walter R. Pike. She attended Brigham Young University, graduating in 1900; while a student, she wrote the College Song, an early fight song for the school. After attending graduate school at the University of Michigan, she returned to Brigham Young to teach English. She began working as a journalist and wrote for The Salt Lake Tribune before moving to Los Angeles in 1905. Soon after arriving, she met a friend she had known in Salt Lake City, Charles O. Greenwood. They married on September 19, 1905.

The couple moved often, living in California, Colorado, and Kansas before ultimately settling in Idaho in 1913. At the time, irrigation projects in the Magic Valley region were drawing many new residents to farm the area. The couple settled in Jerome County in one of the small communities that sprung up in the early twentieth century. The community would later be named Greenwood in honor of the couple. The Greenwoods often struggled financially during their time in Idaho, and Annie taught at the local school on multiple occasions in order to earn more money. She began writing about her life in Idaho for magazines during this period; her first published piece appeared in The Atlantic Monthly in 1919, and she wrote for The Nation in 1923. She also chaired the English literature department at the Idaho Technical Institute, now known as Idaho State University. During this time, Charles was active in local politics and served one term each in the Idaho House of Representatives and Idaho Senate in 1919-20 and 1927-28 respectively.

The Greenwoods' farm was foreclosed upon in 1928, forcing them to abandon their farming lifestyle and relocate to Twin Falls. The couple separated and ultimately divorced in the 1930s, and Annie moved to Salt Lake City. In 1934, she published her first and ultimately only book, the memoir We Sagebrush Folks. The book described her life and struggles as the wife of a farmer. While she praised Idaho and its scenery in the book, she depicted farm life and her community much more harshly, even exclaiming "we lost the farm, thank God" after the foreclosure. It also depicted sex-related stories and tragedies, including that of a woman who died after attempting to induce an abortion with carbolic acid. Her former neighbors responded angrily to the memoir, describing it as "fiction" and suggesting that she would have been forced from town had she not already left. However, the book is now regarded as a significant and accurate depiction of early Idaho settlement.

== We Sagebrush Folks ==
She addressed the challenges of rural farm life in the United States in her book We Sagebrush Folks. It deals with issues including childbirth, mental health, incest, and abortion. Greenwood discusses the poverty of rural farming and government failings.

== Death and legacy ==
Greenwood died on February 22, 1956, in Sacramento, California and was buried on March 10 in the Provo City Cemetery in Provo, Utah. Idaho Public Television produced a series on her.
