= Greenwood School (Hazelton, Idaho) =

Historic place in Idaho, United States

- U.S. National Register of Historic Places
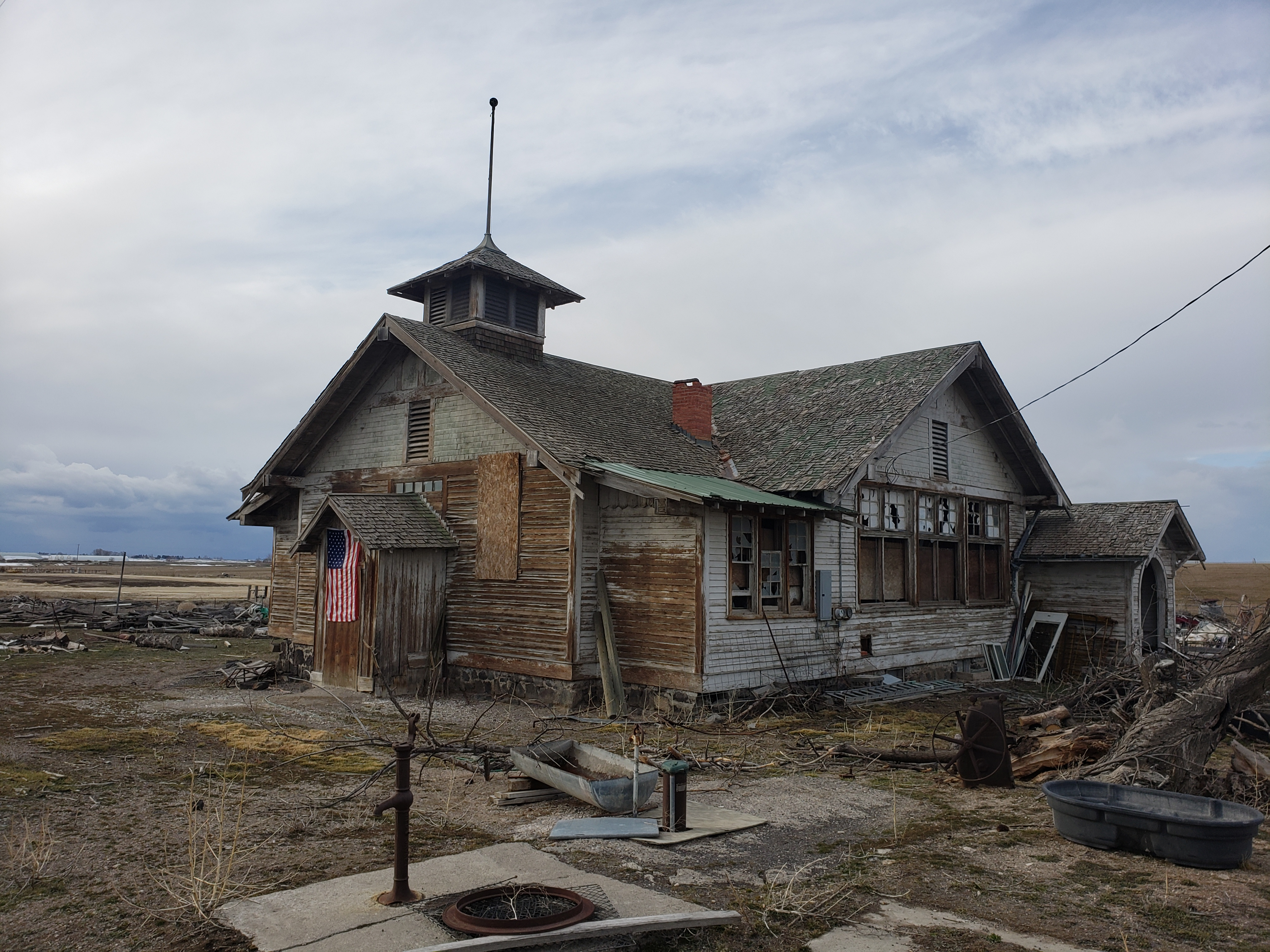

- Location within Idaho Location within the United States
- Location: 2398 East 990 South, Hazelton, Idaho
- Coordinates: 42°34′35″N 114°03′00″W
- Built: c. 1914
- Architectural style: American Craftsman
- MPS: Public School Buildings in Idaho
- NRHP reference No.: 100005364
- Added to NRHP: July 27, 2020

Greenwood School is a historic school building at 2398 East 990 South in Jerome County, Idaho, near the city of Hazelton. The school opened circa 1914 in the pioneer settlement of Greenwood, one of many communities formed after irrigation projects enabled farming in Idaho's Magic Valley. Both the school and the community were named for pioneer couple Annie Pike and Charles Greenwood; Annie was a local teacher before the school was built, and her writings document much of the school's early history. According to Annie, the school was also the center of Greenwood's social life, playing host to Christmas celebrations, political events, and homefront efforts during World War I. The school building has an American Craftsman design which is similar to a school in Rogerson and likely came from a premade plan. An addition was placed on the school in the 1920s to accommodate Greenwood's growing population. The school closed in 1954 as a result of local school consolidation.

The school was added to the National Register of Historic Places on July 27, 2020.
