= Greenwood River =

Greenwood River may refer to:

- Greenwood River (Brule River)
- Greenwood River (Stony River)

== See also ==
- Greenwood (disambiguation)
