= Velma Caldwell Melville =

American editor and writer (1858–1924)

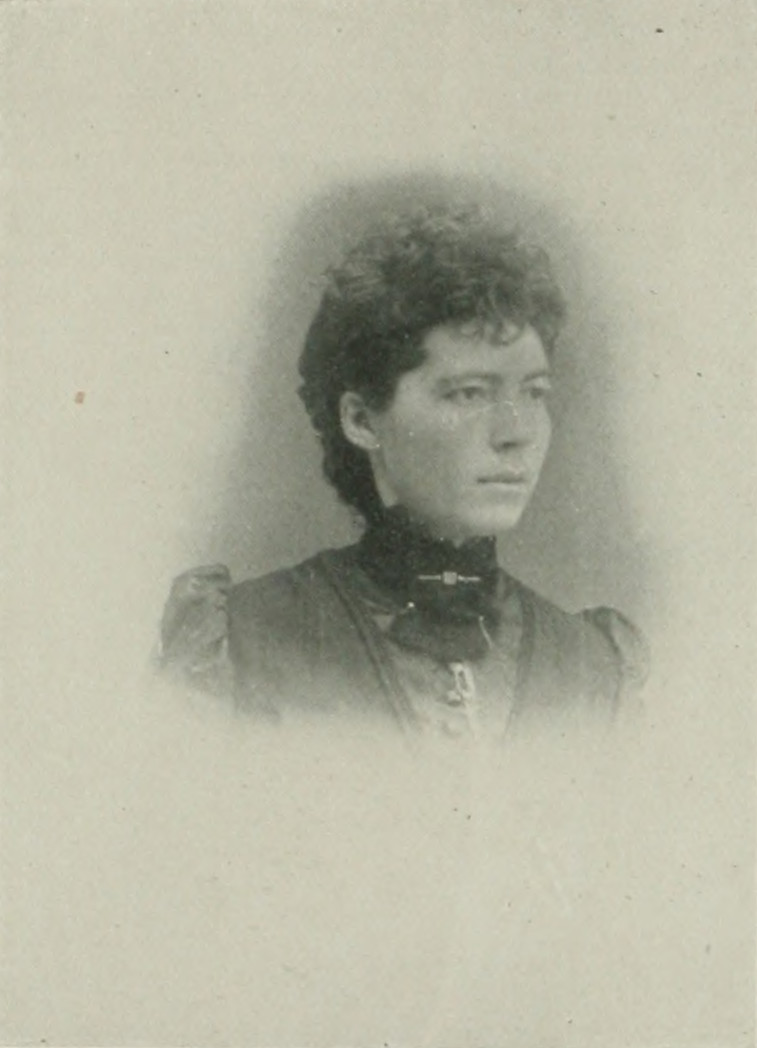
- Photo in A Woman of the Century
- Born: July 1, 1858; Greenwood, Vernon County, Wisconsin, U.S.
- Died: August 25, 1924 (aged 66); Gainesville, Florida, U.S.
- Occupations: Editor; poet; writer
- Spouse: James Melville
- Writing career
- Language: English
- Notable work: White Dandy

Velma Caldwell Melville (née, Caldwell; July 1, 1858 – August 25, 1924) was an American editor, and writer of prose and poetry from Wisconsin. She edited the Practical Farmer (Philadelphia, Pennsylvania) and the Wisconsin Farmer (Madison, Wisconsin). Melville was one of the most voluminous writers of her time in Central/Western U.S. publications. She wrote several serials, and her poems and sketches appeared in nearly 100 publications.

== Early life and education ==
Velma Caldwell was born in Greenwood, Vernon County, Wisconsin, July 1, 1858. Her parents were William A. Caldwell and the former Artlissa Jordan. They were originally from Ohio, moving to Wisconsin in 1855. William A. Caldwell died during the Siege of Petersburg when Melville was five years old, which subsequently influenced her intensely patriotic writings.

== Career ==
Melville's productions in verse and prose appeared extensively in the St. Louis Observer, St. Louis Magazine, Housekeeper, Ladies' Home Journal, Daughters of America, Chicago Inter Ocean, Advocate and Guardian, Weekly Wisconsin, Midland School Journal, Chicago Ledger, West Shore Magazine and many other publications. She served as editor of the "Home Circle and Youth's Department" of the Practical Farmer of Philadelphia, and the "Health and Home Department" in the Wisconsin Farmer of Madison. Melville was a devoted follower of Henry Bergh. She was said to "speak for those who can not speak for themselves", being one of the most voluminous writers in publications of that time that the Central/Western US had produced.

Melville conducted the Wisconsin Human Society's "Band of Mercy Parliament" from Madison, Wisconsin. She was the author of White Dandy, Or Master And I; A Horse's Story. A companion to Black Beauty, it tells a similar story of the adventures and abuses of a horse, Dandy, and its companions from the animals' standpoint. It was said to help forward the movement for the protection and proper care of animals, teaching kindness to the horse as well as to other animals. It was issued by J.S. Ogilvie Publishing Company, New York, and was sold for US$0.25 per copy.

== Personal life ==
At the age of 20, she married James Melville, C. E., a graduate of the Wisconsin State University, who went on to become an educator and a prohibitionist. For 10 years, her home was in Poynette, Wisconsin, before she removed to Sun Prairie, Wisconsin, where her husband was principal of the high school.

She died on August 25, 1924, in Gainesville, Florida.

== Selected works ==
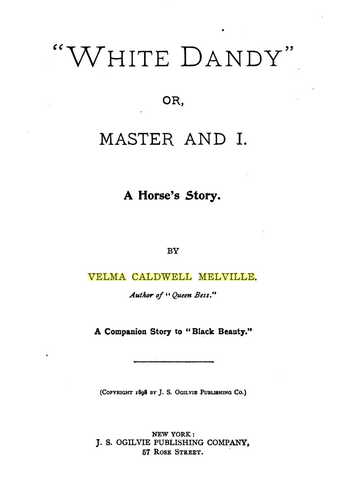
White Dandy, Or Master And I; A Horse's Story. by Velma Caldwell Melville

- Queen Bess
- White Dandy; or, Master and I: A Horse's Story (1898)

=== Articles ===
- "Among Ourselves", Wisconsin Humane Herald, October 1915
- "Boys and flowers", The Wisconsin Farmer, 1892
- "Make the Children Humane", Our church Life, 1895
- "Not Pretty, But Practical", Annual Report of the Wisconsin State Horticultural Society, Volume 24, February 1894

=== Short stories ===
- "The Double Christmas Wedding", St. Louis Illustrated Magazine, December 1887

=== Recipes ===
- Fancy pickle, The Journal of Agriculture Cook Book, 1894
