= Greenwood County =

Greenwood County is the name of two counties in the United States:

- Greenwood County, Kansas
- Greenwood County, South Carolina

== See also ==
- Greenwood (disambiguation)
