= Greenwood Township =

Greenwood Township may refer to:

== Arkansas ==
- Greenwood Township, Baxter County, Arkansas, in Baxter County, Arkansas
- Greenwood Township, Poinsett County, Arkansas, in Poinsett County, Arkansas

== Illinois ==
- Greenwood Township, Christian County, Illinois
- Greenwood Township, McHenry County, Illinois

== Iowa ==
- Greenwood Township, Kossuth County, Iowa

== Kansas ==
- Greenwood Township, Franklin County, Kansas

== Michigan ==
- Greenwood Township, Clare County, Michigan
- Greenwood Township, Oceana County, Michigan
- Greenwood Township, Oscoda County, Michigan
- Greenwood Township, St. Clair County, Michigan
- Greenwood Township, Wexford County, Michigan

== Minnesota ==
- Greenwood Township, Clearwater County, Minnesota
- Greenwood Township, St. Louis County, Minnesota

== Pennsylvania ==
- Greenwood Township, Clearfield County, Pennsylvania
- Greenwood Township, Columbia County, Pennsylvania
- Greenwood Township, Crawford County, Pennsylvania
- Greenwood Township, Juniata County, Pennsylvania
- Greenwood Township, Perry County, Pennsylvania

== South Dakota ==
- Greenwood Township, Tripp County, South Dakota, in Tripp County, South Dakota

== See also ==
- Greenwood (disambiguation)
