= Greenwood, Idaho =

Unincorporated community in the state of Idaho, United States

- Former community
- Location within Idaho Location within the United States
- Coordinates: 42°34′36″N 114°2′58″W
- Country: United States
- State: Idaho
- County: Jerome
- Elevation: 4,393 ft (1,339 m)
- Time zone: UTC-7 (Mountain (PST))
  - Summer (DST): UTC-6 (PDT)
- Area codes: 208, 986
- GNIS feature ID: 376159

Greenwood was an unincorporated community located in Jerome County, Idaho, United States. The community was one of many new settlements formed in Idaho's Magic Valley in the 1910s after several dam projects enabled farming in the area. It took its name from pioneer couple Annie Pike and Charles Greenwood; Annie was an author and teacher who documented much of the community's early history, while Charles was a politician who served in the Idaho House of Representatives and Idaho Senate. Greenwood had its own school, Greenwood School, which was built circa 1914; it operated until 1954 and is one of the few surviving buildings from the community. The school's closure initiated Greenwood's decline as a community, and the construction of Interstate 84 in the early 1960s split the community in half, essentially dissolving it.
