= Greenwood Memorial Park =

Greenwood Memorial Park may refer to:

- Greenwood Memorial Park (Fort Worth)
- Greenwood Memorial Park (Phoenix)
- Greenwood Memorial Park (Renton, Washington)
- Greenwood Memorial Park (San Diego)
