= Greenwood, California =

Greenwood, California may refer to:

- Greenwood, El Dorado County, California
- Greenwood, Glenn County, California
- Greenwood, California, former name of Elk, Mendocino County, California
- Greenwood, Sonoma County, California, a former community near Sears Point
