= Greenwood Lake (disambiguation) =

Greenwood Lake is a lake in Orange County, New York and West Milford, Passaic County, New Jersey.

Greenwood Lake may also refer to:

- Greenwood Lake, New York, a village in Orange County
- Greenwood Lake (Lake County, Minnesota), a lake
- Greenwood Lake (Nova Scotia), a lake in Guysborough District
