= Greenwood (Columbia, Missouri) =

Historic house in Missouri, United States

- U.S. National Register of Historic Places
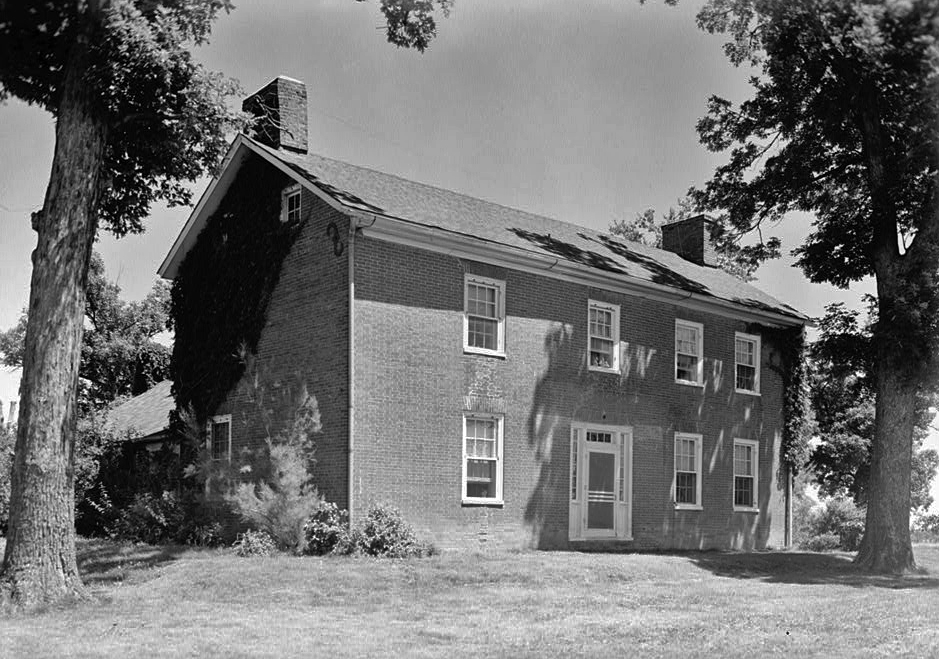

- Location within Missouri Location within the United States
- Location: 3005 Mexico Gravel Rd., Columbia, Missouri
- Coordinates: 38°58′47″N 92°17′32″W
- Area: less than one acre
- Built: 1839
- Architectural style: Federal
- NRHP reference No.: 79001347
- Added to NRHP: January 15, 1979

Greenwood, also known as Greenwood Heights, is a historic home located at Columbia, Missouri. It was built about 1839, and is a two-story, "T"-plan, Federal style red brick farmhouse on a stone foundation. It is one of the oldest remaining structures in Boone County, Missouri. Today the house is under private ownership.

The property was added to the National Register of Historic Places in 1979.
