= Greenwood station =

Greenwood station may refer to:

- Greenwood station (Indiana), a former interurban station in Greenwood, Indiana
- Greenwood station (Mississippi), an Amtrak station in Greenwood, Mississippi
- Greenwood station (MBTA), a commuter rail station in Wakefield, Massachusetts
- Greenwood station (Toronto), a subway station in Toronto, Ontario
- Greenwood railway station, a commuter rail station in Perth, Western Australia

== See also ==
- Greenwood Yard, a Toronto Transit Commission subway train yard
