= Greenwood Farm =

Greenwood Farm may refer to:

- Greenwood Farm (Ipswich, Massachusetts), a historic property and nature reserve
- Greenwood Farm (Delaware, Ohio), on the National Register of Historic Places listings in Delaware County, Ohio
- Greenwood Farm (Richmond Heights, Ohio), a historic farm property
- Greenwood Farm (Tredyffrin Township, Pennsylvania), a historic home and farm in Chester County
