= Greenwood Elementary School (Terre Haute, Indiana) =

- U.S. National Register of Historic Places
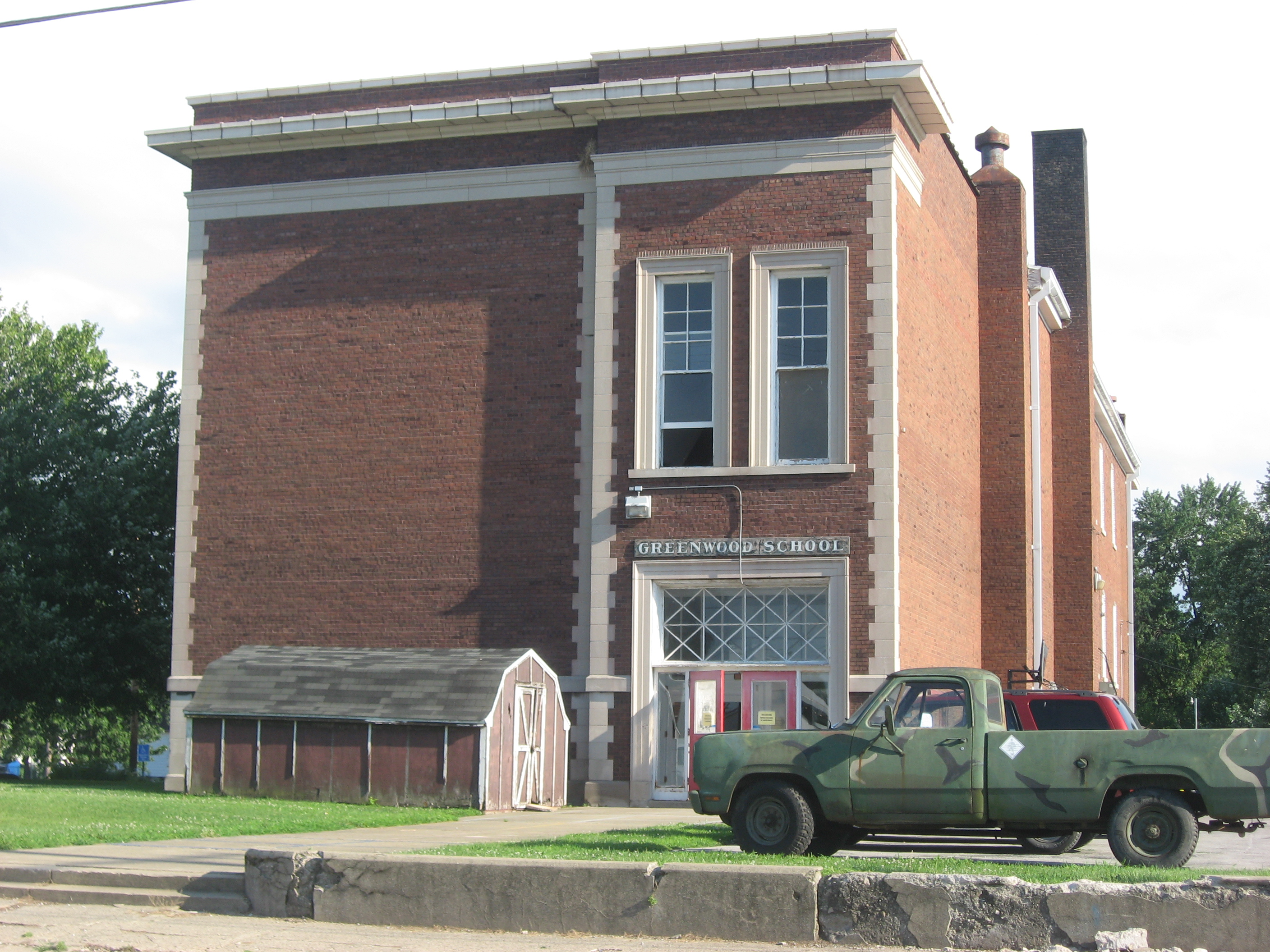
- Greenwood Elementary School, July 2011

- Location within Vigo County, Indiana Location within Indiana Location within the United States
- Location: 145 E. Voorhees Ave., Terre Haute, Indiana
- Coordinates: 39°26′26″N 87°24′56″W
- Area: 2.1 acres (0.85 ha)
- Built: 1907-1908
- Built by: Allen, W.M. & Son Co.
- Architect: Vrydagh, Jupiter G.
- Architectural style: Late 19th And 20th Century Revivals, Classical Revival
- NRHP reference No.: 97001177
- Added to NRHP: September 26, 1997

Greenwood Elementary School, also known as the City School No. 21, is a historic elementary school building located at Terre Haute, Indiana. It was built in 1907–1908, and is a two-story, Classical Revival style brick building on a raised basement. It features two-story pilasters, broken pediments, and round arches on the interior. The building measures approximately 23,800 square feet. The building ceased use as a school in May 1988.

It was listed on the National Register of Historic Places in 1997.
