= Greenwoods =

UK company

- Industry: Retail
- Founded: 1860; 166 years ago
- Founder: Willie Greenwood
- Defunct: 2 January 2019
- Headquarters: Bradford, England
- Number of locations: 80 (April 2011) 20 (April 2018)
- Products: Menswear
- Revenue: £29 million (2010)
- Operating income: ▼£22,000 (2008)
- Number of employees: 500

Greenwoods was a chain of menswear stores with headquarters in Bradford, England.

== History ==
The company was founded by Willie Greenwood in 1860 as a hatter's shop in Bradford. At its peak in the 1990s there were around 200 branches of the store.

In October 2008, a Chinese retailer expressed an interest in purchasing a 50% stake in the chain. However, whilst negotiations were made, the company was hit badly by the downturn in the global and British economy in the last quarter of 2008. On 23 January 2009, Greenwoods entered administration and a subsidiary of Harvest Fancy Hong Kong bought 87 of the 92 stores across the UK from the administrators. Prior to entering administration, Greenwoods had a turnover of £25.9 million and employed 579 people.

Greenwoods had their headquarters in Albion Mills, Greengates, Bradford but have moved to newly built premises on the Shipley Airedale Road nearer the city centre.

== 2010-2018 ==
By April 2011 there were 80 stores trading across the UK. Greenwoods was committed to improving and upgrading the image of its stores with an investment programme, funded by its parent company, Pacific Trend Investment.

Accounting for 20 per cent of the company's revenue, the 1860 brand was the second largest formal garment hire company in the UK. Greenwoods also introduced a slim-fit range of suits, shirts, ties and shoes under the 1860 brand.

Greenwoods entered administration on 7 September 2017.

It was announced on 2 January 2019 that the business was in liquidation, a little over 18 months since it previously fell into administration. All store branches and the online store ceased trading on 2 January 2019.
