= Greenwood, Arizona =

Populated place in Mohave County, Arizona

- Populated Place
- Location within the state of Arizona Greenwood (the United States)
- Coordinates: 34°30′28″N 113°35′41″W
- Country: United States
- State: Arizona
- County: Mohave
- Elevation: 4,000 ft (1,220 m)
- Time zone: UTC-7 (Mountain (MST))
  - Summer (DST): UTC-7 (MST)
- Area code: 928
- FIPS code: 04-29830
- GNIS feature ID: 24438

Greenwood is a populated place situated in Mohave County, Arizona, United States. It has an estimated elevation of 1,499 feet (457 m) above sea level.
