= Greenwood, Clarksville, Tennessee =

Coordinates: 36.5120°N 87.3425°W

Greenwood is a neighborhood in the southern part of the city of Clarksville, Tennessee, USA. Located directly south of downtown, Greenwood is often defined as the area delimited by South Riverside Drive to the west, the Mason Rudolph golf course to the east, Ashland City Road (US-41A Bypass/TN-12) to the south, and Crossland Avenue to the north. It is one of the oldest neighborhoods in the city of Clarksville. The cemetery that lies within the community, and also bears its name, is one of the oldest in the state of Tennessee, and is the final resting place of Frank Sutton of Sgt. Carter fame from the show Gomer Pyle, U.S.M.C.. Olympic gold medalist Wilma Rudolph is also buried in Greenwood at a much smaller cemetery, adjacent to the Mason Rudolph golf course. In the early 21st century, the neighborhood had declining conditions of some of its older homes and rising crime rates. The Greenwood and Summit Heights housing project is located in Greenwood, as are the Montgomery County Alternative School, CMCSS headquarters, the Clarksville-Montgomery County Library, and a former boot factory which burned down in 2006.

== History ==
In the early 20th century, the area known as Greenwood was just starting to develop, a prime location to raise a family at that time; many of the typical bungalow houses of the 1950s still dot the landscape. The area was home to the first Clarksville High School, constructed in 1907 at the corner of Madison Street and Greenwood Avenue. The high school still stands but has been renovated and turned into apartments.

== Transportation ==
The area is served by several CTS bus routes that go throughout the city. US Route 41-A runs along its southern border with direct access by way of the by pass to I-24. The Clarksville area is served regionally by Outlaw Field airport, and internationally by Nashville International Airport.
