= Charles O. Greenwood =

American politician from Idaho in 1920s

Charles O. Greenwood was an American farmer and a member of the Idaho House of Representatives from 1919 to 1920 and of the Idaho Senate from 1927 to 1928.

The community of Greenwood, Idaho was named in honor of Greenwood and his wife Annie Pike Greenwood.
