= Greenwood (Orange, Virginia) =

Historic house in Virginia, United States

- U.S. National Register of Historic Places
- Virginia Landmarks Register
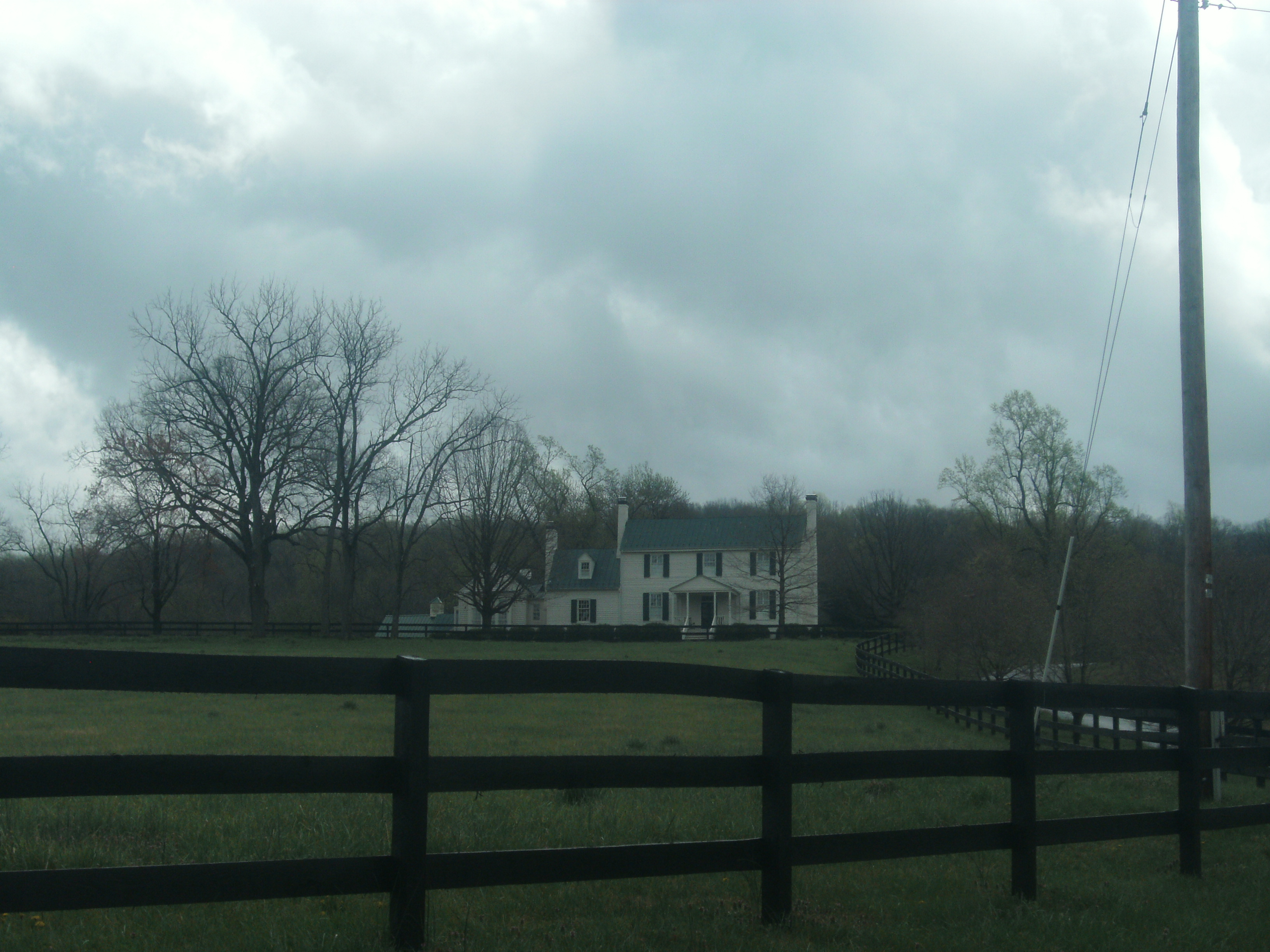
- Greenwood, April 2017

- Location within Virginia Location within the United States
- Location: 13011 Greenwood Rd., near Orange, Virginia
- Coordinates: 38°13′42″N 78°8′19″W
- Area: 111 acres (45 ha)
- Built: c. 1820, c. 1850
- Architectural style: Greek Revival, Federal
- NRHP reference No.: 92001702
- VLR No.: 068-0052

Significant dates
- Added to NRHP: December 17, 1992
- Designated VLR: October 21, 1992

Greenwood is a historic home located near Orange, Orange County, Virginia. It was built about 1820, and is a two-story, three-bay, timber frame Federal style I-house with a side gable roof. It has a center-passage plan, a raised basement, and two exterior-end chimneys. The Greek Revival style front entry porch has brick piers supporting a one-story wooden porch with a gable roof and triangular pediment supported by square paired columns. A one-bay, single-pile timber-frame wing addition, built about 1850. Also on the property are a contributing outbuilding, well, and the grave of Mary Roberta Macon who died at age nine in 1847.

It was listed on the National Register of Historic Places in 1992.
