= Greenwood, Boone County, West Virginia =

Greenwood, West Virginia
- Unincorporated community
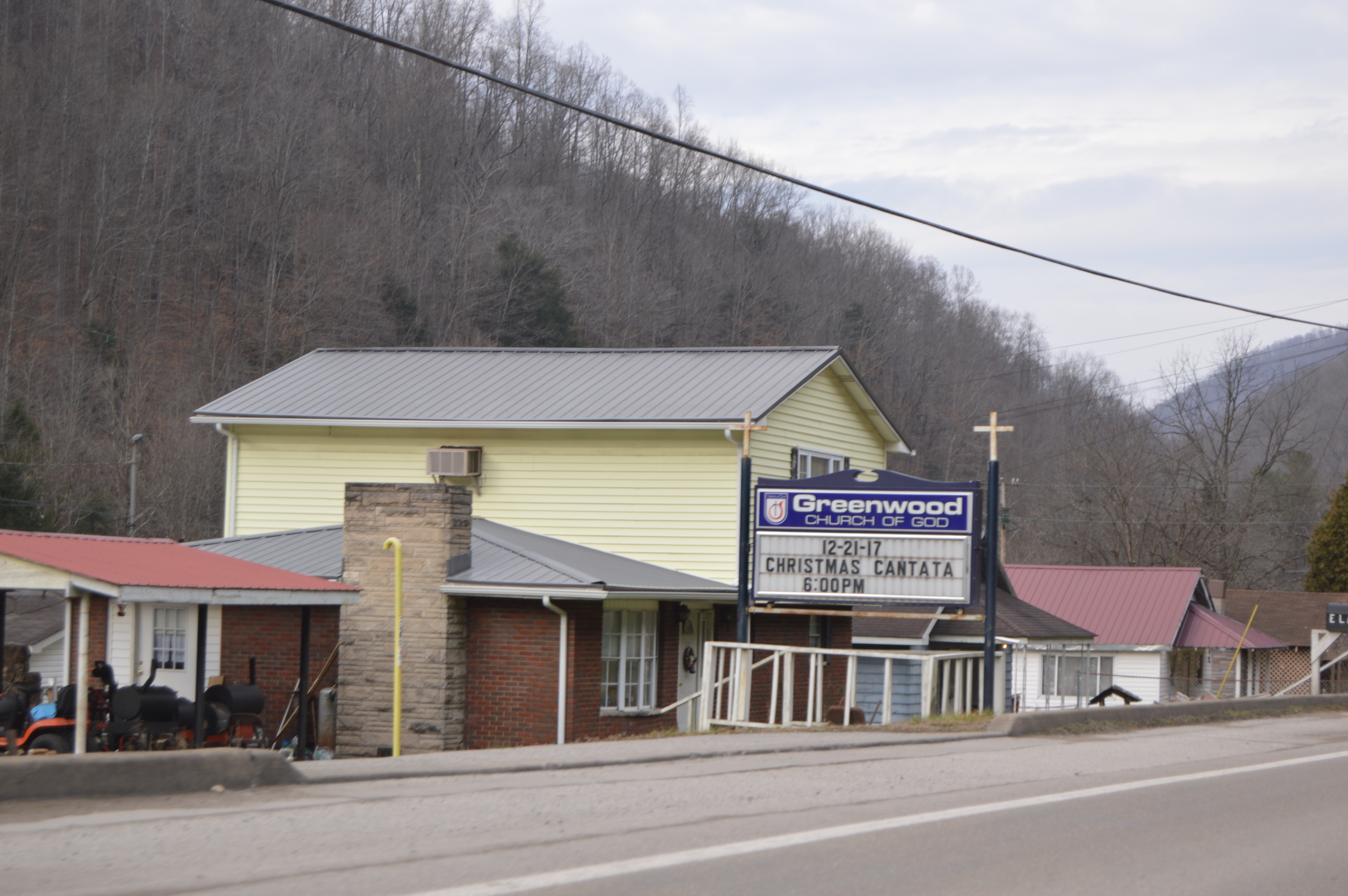
- Scene along West Virginia Route 85

- Location within West Virginia Location within the United States
- Coordinates: 37°51′19″N 81°37′50″W
- Country: United States
- State: West Virginia
- County: Boone
- Elevation: 1,135 ft (346 m)
- Time zone: UTC-5 (Eastern (EST))
  - Summer (DST): UTC-4 (EDT)
- Area codes: 304 & 681
- GNIS feature ID: 1554611

Greenwood is an unincorporated community in Boone County, West Virginia, United States. Greenwood is located along West Virginia Route 85 and Pond Fork, 18 miles (29 km) south-southeast of Madison.
