= Greenwood, Doddridge County, West Virginia =

Greenwood, West Virginia
- Unincorporated community
- Location within West Virginia Location within the United States
- Coordinates: 39°16′29″N 80°53′26″W
- Country: United States
- State: West Virginia
- County: Doddridge
- Elevation: 837 ft (255 m)
- Time zone: UTC-5 (Eastern (EST))
  - Summer (DST): UTC-4 (EDT)
- Area codes: 304 & 681
- GNIS feature ID: 1554612

Greenwood is an unincorporated community in Doddridge County, West Virginia, United States. Greenwood is located along U.S. Route 50, 6.5 miles (10.5 km) west-southwest of West Union.
