= Greenwood, Fayette County, West Virginia =

- Ghost town
- Location within West Virginia
- Coordinates: 37°52′43″N 80°59′16″W
- Country: United States
- State: West Virginia
- County: Fayette
- Elevation: 2,467 ft (752 m)
- GNIS feature ID: 1556112

Greenwood is a ghost town in Fayette County, West Virginia, United States. Greenwood was 0.8 miles (1.3 km) northwest of Lawton. Greenwood appeared on USGS maps as late as 1912.
