= Greenwood, Parker County, Texas =

Greenwood, Texas
- Town
- Location within the state of Texas
- Coordinates: 32°45′8″N 97°51′38″W
- Country: United States
- State: Texas
- County: Wise
- Time zone: UTC-6 (Central (CST))
  - Summer (DST): UTC-5 (CDT)

Greenwood, Texas is a small town in Parker County, Texas, in the United States. The Entravision Texas Tower is located nearby.
