= Greenwood (Culpeper, Virginia) =

Historic house in Virginia, United States

- U.S. National Register of Historic Places
- Virginia Landmarks Register
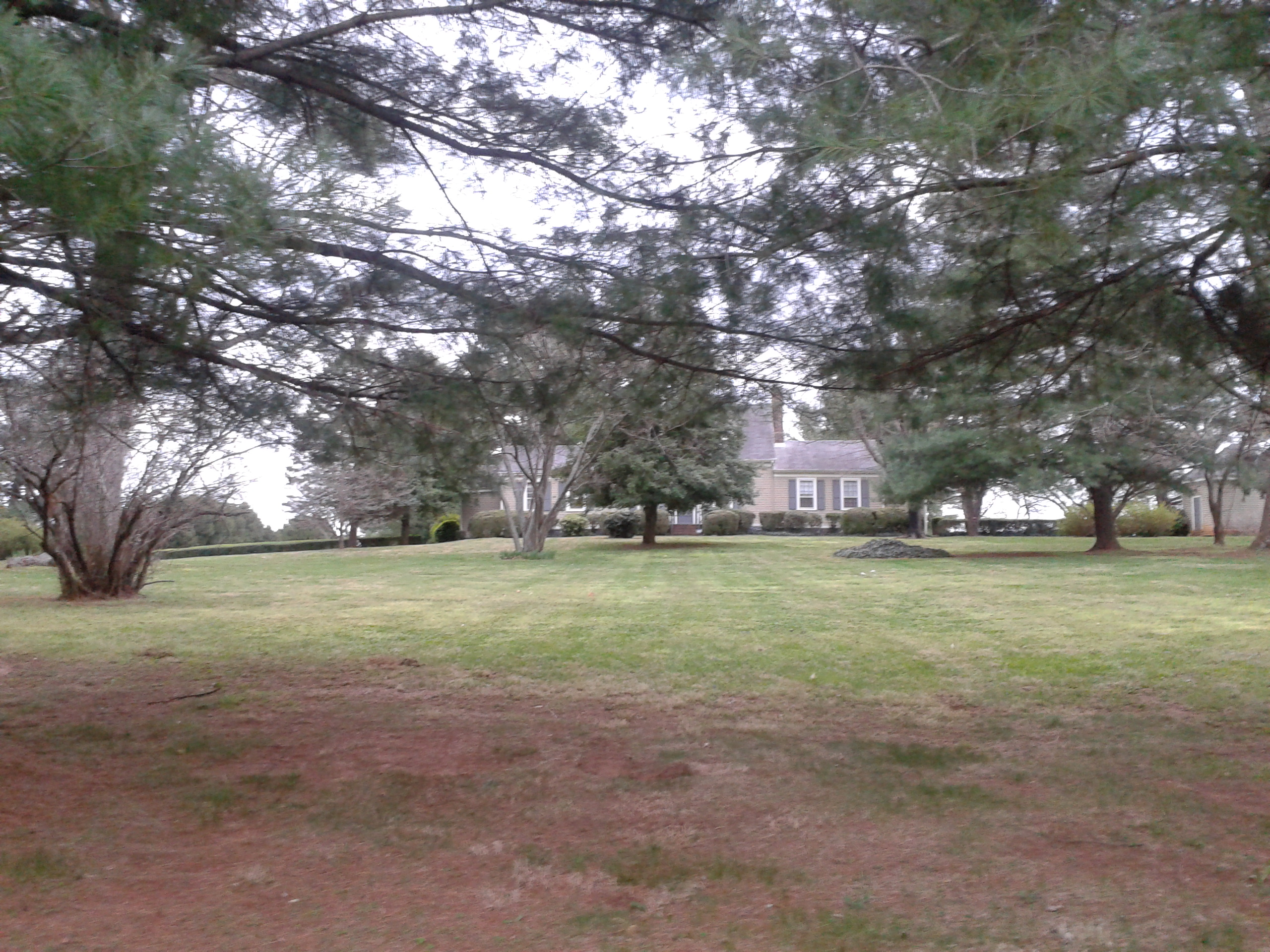
- House and grounds at dusk, April 2017

- Location within Virginia Location within the United States
- Location: 1931 Orange Rd., Culpeper, Virginia
- Coordinates: 38°27′15″N 78°00′02″W
- Area: 50.3 acres (20.4 ha)
- Architectural style: Hall Parlor plan
- NRHP reference No.: 85002914
- VLR No.: 204-0070

Significant dates
- Added to NRHP: November 22, 1985
- Designated VLR: January 18, 1983

Greenwood is a historic plantation house located at Culpeper, Culpeper County, Virginia. It consists of a 1 1/2-story, three-bay, center block dating to the late-18th or early-19th century, with one-story wings dated to 1823–1824. The original section has a hall-parlor plan dwelling. In 1825, Greenwood received as visitors the Marquis de Lafayette and former President James Monroe during Lafayette's celebrated tour as "guest of the nation." During the American Civil War Federal troops occupied the house and plantation and placed a cannon on the lawn.

It was listed on the National Register of Historic Places in 1985.
