= Greenwood, Vernon County, Wisconsin =

Greenwood, Wisconsin
- Town
- Location in Vernon County and the state of Wisconsin.
- Coordinates: 43°36′5″N 90°21′37″W
- Country: United States
- State: Wisconsin
- County: Vernon

Area
  - Total: 35.8 sq mi (92.7 km^{2})
  - Land: 35.8 sq mi (92.7 km^{2})
  - Water: 0 sq mi (0.0 km^{2})
- Elevation: 1,243 ft (379 m)

Population (2020)
  - Total: 923
  - Density: 25.8/sq mi (9.96/km^{2})
- Time zone: UTC-6 (Central (CST))
  - Summer (DST): UTC-5 (CDT)
- Area code: 608
- FIPS code: 55-31625
- GNIS feature ID: 1583325

Greenwood is a town in Vernon County, Wisconsin, United States. The population was 923 at the 2020 census.

== Geography ==
According to the United States Census Bureau, the town has a total area of 35.8 square miles (92.7 km^{2}), all land.

== Demographics ==
As of the census of 2000, there were 770 people, 201 households, and 176 families residing in the town. The population density was 21.5 people per square mile (8.3/km^{2}). There were 252 housing units at an average density of 7.0 per square mile (2.7/km^{2}). The racial makeup of the town was 99.22% White, 0.26% African American, 0.13% Pacific Islander, 0.13% from other races, and 0.26% from two or more races. Hispanic or Latino of any race were 0.65% of the population.

There were 201 households, out of which 48.8% had children under the age of 18 living with them, 81.1% were married couples living together, 5.0% had a female householder with no husband present, and 12.4% were non-families. 10.9% of all households were made up of individuals, and 4.5% had someone living alone who was 65 years of age or older. The average household size was 3.83 and the average family size was 4.09.

In the town, the population was spread out, with 38.7% under the age of 18, 11.9% from 18 to 24, 23.0% from 25 to 44, 19.1% from 45 to 64, and 7.3% who were 65 years of age or older. The median age was 24 years. For every 100 females, there were 104.8 males. For every 100 females age 18 and over, there were 104.3 males.

The median income for a household in the town was $36,458, and the median income for a family was $34,063. Males had a median income of $22,917 versus $18,214 for females. The per capita income for the town was $10,567. About 18.9% of families and 29.5% of the population were below the poverty line, including 47.4% of those under age 18 and 9.7% of those age 65 or over.

== Notable people ==
- Velma Caldwell Melville, writer
