= Greenwood (Alexandria, Alabama) =

Historic Antebellum plantation house

- U.S. National Register of Historic Places
- Alabama Register of Landmarks and Heritage
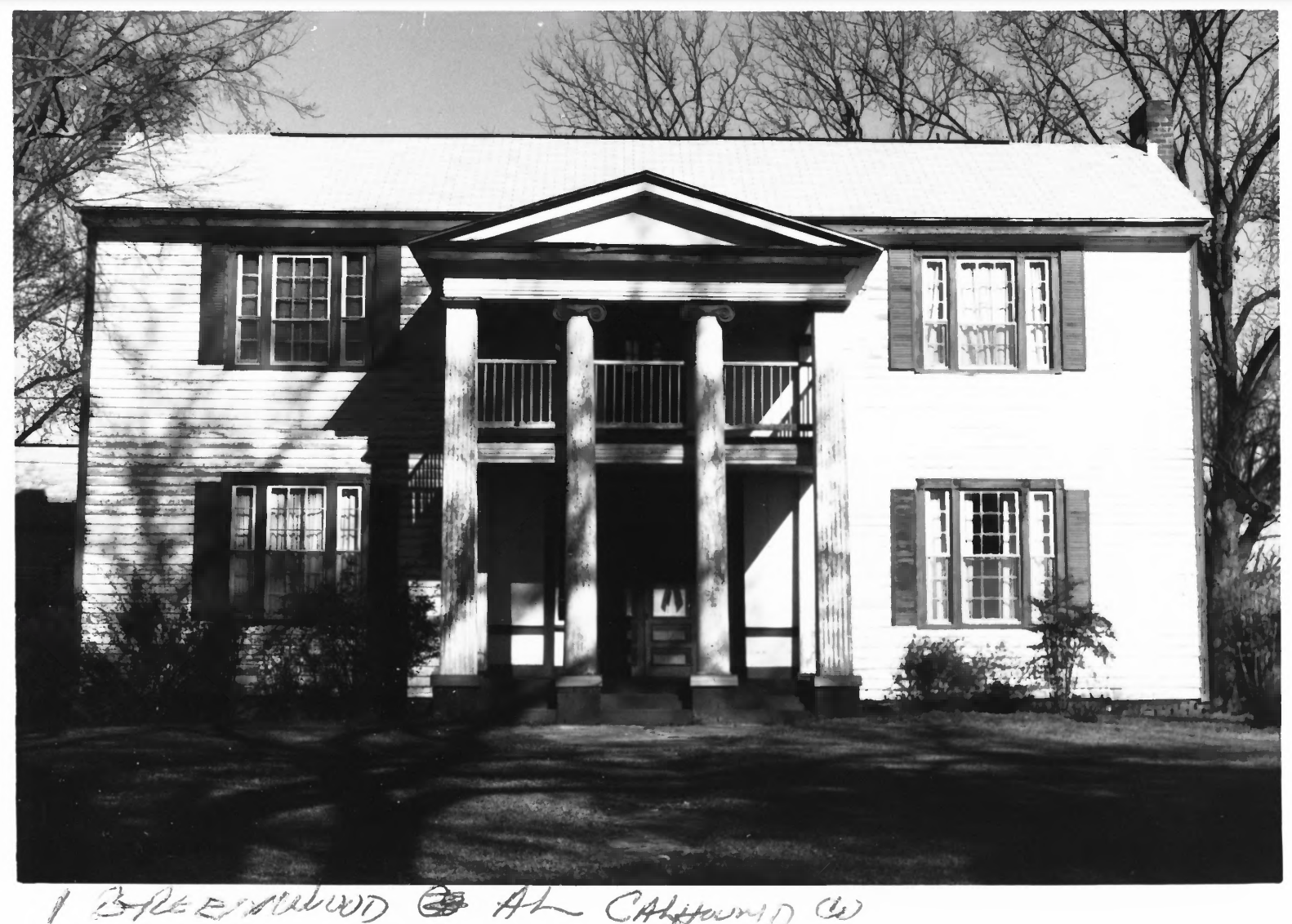
- Location: Alexandria, Alabama, U.S.
- Coordinates: 33.7725°N 85.88°W
- Built: 1842–1850
- Architectural style: Greek Revival
- NRHP reference No.: 89000162

Significant dates
- Added to NRHP: March 9, 1989
- Designated ARLH: April 23, 1987

Greenwood, also known as the Green–Woodruff House (built 1842–1850), is a historic Antebellum plantation house in Alexandria, Alabama, U.S.. It was once part of the Greenwood Plantation, which had been worked by enslaved people. Some six generations of the Green–Woodruff family owned the house.

It is listed on the National Register of Historic Places since March 9, 1989 for the architecture; and is listed on the Alabama Register of Landmarks and Heritage since April 23, 1987. Greenwood also has a historical marker.

== Architecture ==
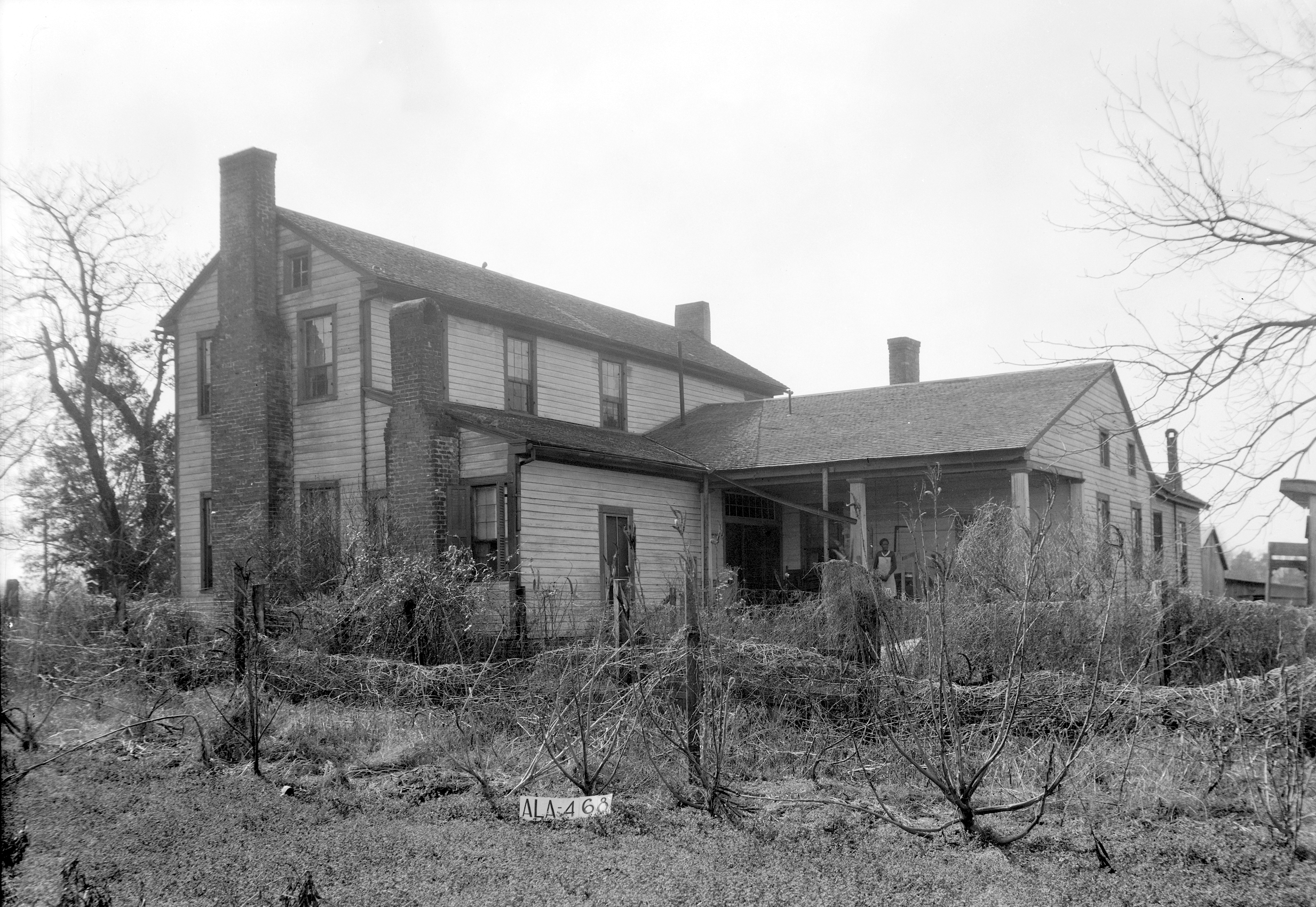
Rear and side view of Greenwood in 1935

Greenwood is an example of a rural Alabama vernacular domestic building, displaying Greek Revival architectural details. The architect is unknown. The two story building was built starting in 1842, and contains four columns (two Doric and two Ionic). The house exhibits the traditional I-house form: two rooms high and one room deep with a tall and narrow profile. It includes an intricate portico in the Greek Revival style. This style of house in mid-nineteenth-century Alabama was common practice for the design and construction of plantation houses.

In 1850, the house construction was completed.

== History ==
The house was built for Jacob Ross Green (1810–c. 1875) from South Carolina. Around 1820, his family moved to St. Clair County, Alabama. In 1831, Jacob Ross Green married Elizabeth Boyd, the daughter of Judge Samuel Boyd, and soon began acquiring land in the newly established county of Benton (later renamed Calhoun County). Under the Treaty of Cusseta in 1832, the United States Government acquired the entire Creek Nation land holdings, which included lands in northeast Alabama. Upon petition, land patents were issued to the White settlers many of whom had recently moved to the area. On April 25, 1842, O. E. Burt sold to Jacob Ross Green 150 acres (61 ha) of land and it was on the tract he built his home known as Greenwood. He farmed the land and became successful, and by 1844 he had owned eleven enslaved people.

Jacob Green had five children, including Samuel LaFayette Green Sr., the next owner of Greenwood starting in 1865. In 1913, his son S. L. Green Jr. acquired the property. Greenwood stayed in the Green family until 1916, when it was sold to his son-in-law Norris Woodruff.

Woodruff lived at Greenwood for nearly 23 years, until his death in 1939. Woodruff's eldest son, Wallace Green Woodruff acquired the house after his father's death from his many siblings. After his death in 1963, his son Wallace G. Woodruff Jr. acquired the house, and when he died, his five children inherited the house.

== Reportedly haunted ==
The house is said to be haunted by a former nanny named Ms. Polk, affectionately referred to by the family as Ms. Pokey, who died in the 1920s while sitting at the bottom of the house's staircase.

== See also ==
- List of plantations in Alabama
- National Register of Historic Places listings in Calhoun County, Alabama
