= Greenwood, Morgan County, West Virginia =

Greenwood
- Unincorporated community
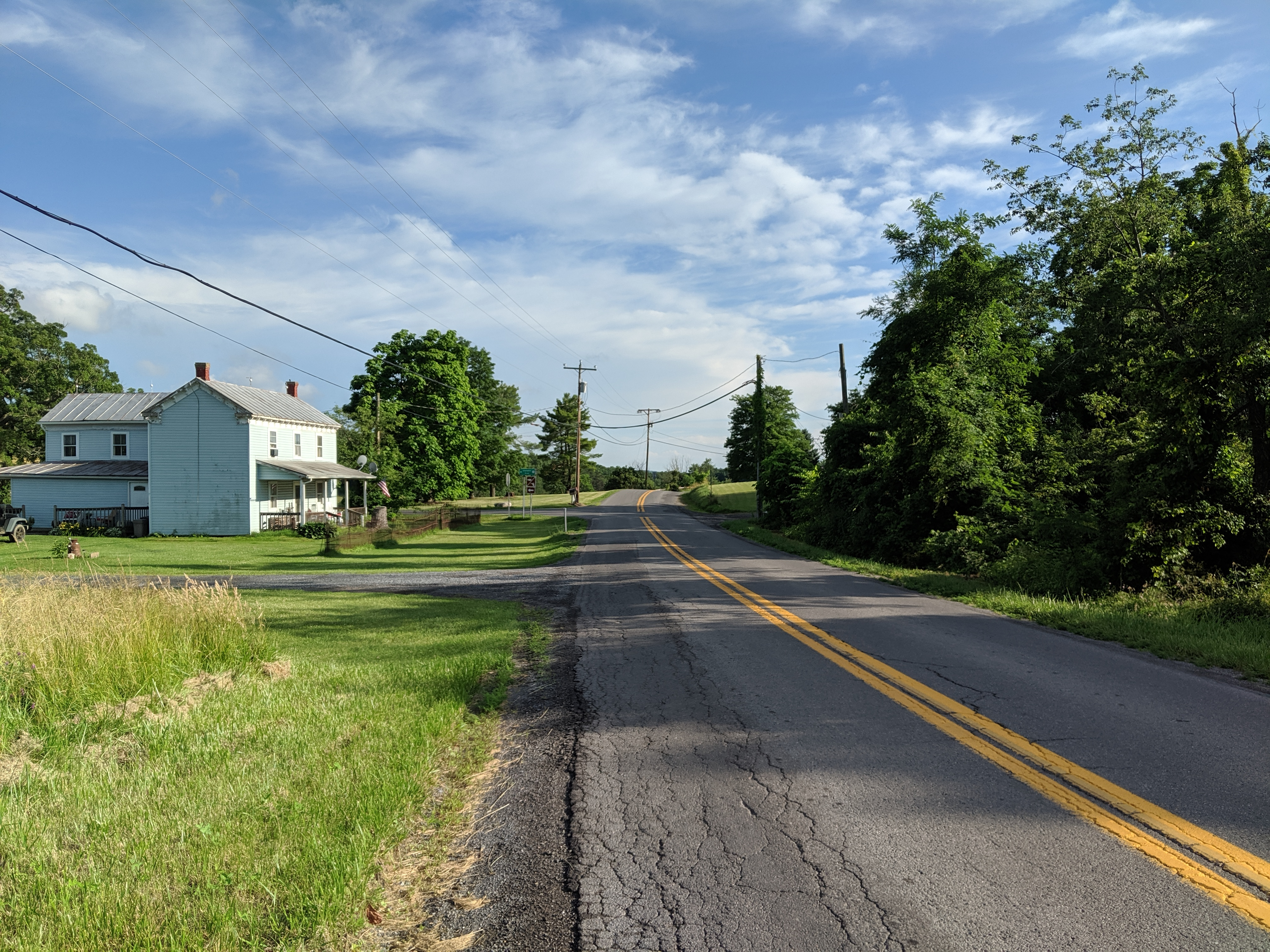
- Winchester Grade Road (County Route 13) near Shanghai Road.

- Location within the state of West Virginia Greenwood (the United States)
- Coordinates: 39°26′35″N 78°13′58″W
- Country: United States
- State: West Virginia
- County: Morgan
- Time zone: UTC-5 (Eastern (EST))
  - Summer (DST): UTC-4 (EDT)
- GNIS feature ID: 1557941

Greenwood is an unincorporated community in southeastern Morgan County in the U.S. state of West Virginia's Eastern Panhandle.

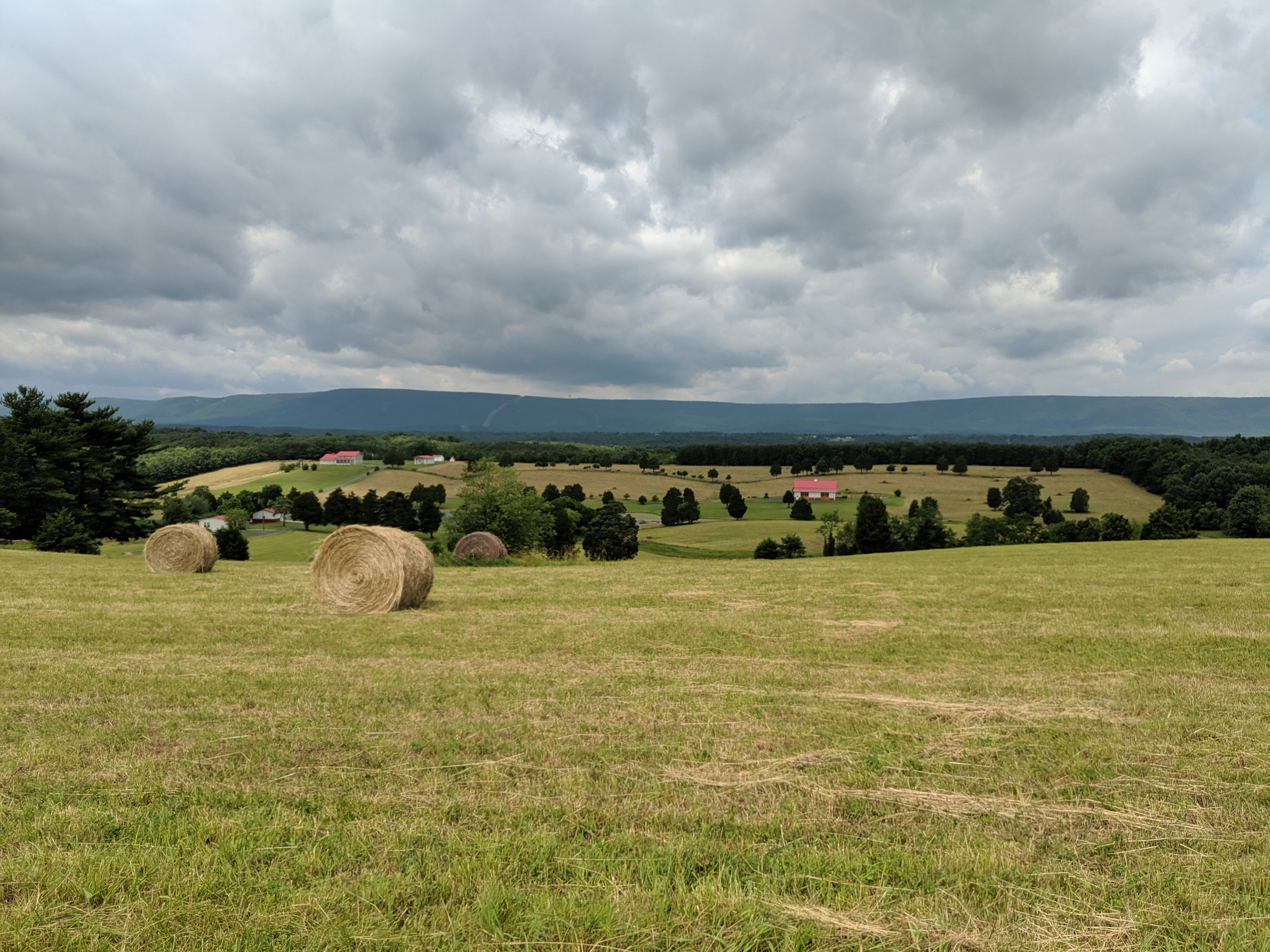
Farmland in Greenwood and Unger, viewed from Winchester Grade Road.
