= Greenwood, Bath County, Virginia =

Unincorporated community in Virginia, US

Coordinates: 37°57′14″N 79°57′59″W

Greenwood, Bath County was an unincorporated community in Bath County, Virginia, United States. Greenwood was abandoned and later flooded due to the construction of Lake Moomaw.
