= Greenwood, Louisville =

Neighborhood in Louisville, Kentucky

Greenwood is a neighborhood of Louisville, Kentucky located along Cane Run Road and Greenwood Road. It is sometimes referred to by its large industrial park and shipping facility, Riverport.

== Geography ==
Greenwood, Louisville is located at 38°8′50″N 85°53′45″W.

This region of Louisville is also known as Pleasure Ridge Park, Louisville.
